= List of death metal bands, !–K =

This is a list of death metal bands (listed by characters !–9 and letters A through K) including bands that have at some stage in their career played within the style of death metal, or one of its sub- or fusion genres; as such there will inevitably be a certain amount of overlap with the list of melodic death metal bands, the list of Swedish death metal bands, and others.

The remaining list can be found at List of death metal bands, L–Z.

== List ==
=== !–9 ===
- 8 Foot Sativa

=== A ===
- A Different Breed of Killer
- Abaddon Incarnate
- Abated Mass of Flesh
- Abhorrence
- Ablaze My Sorrow
- Aborted
- Abramelin
- Abscess
- The Absence
- Abysmal Dawn
- Abysmal Torment
- Acheron
- Acid Witch
- Act of Denial
- Aeon
- Aeternus
- Afflicted
- The Agonist
- Ahab
- Akercocke
- Alchemist
- Aletheian
- Altar
- The Amenta
- Amon Amarth
- Amoral
- Amorphis
- Anata
- Anathema
- Angelcorpse
- Animosity
- Antestor
- Anvil of Doom
- Arch Enemy
- Archgoat
- Archeon
- Architects
- Archspire
- Arise
- Armageddon
- Armoured Angel
- Arsis
- As I Lay Dying
- Asesino
- Asphyx
- Assück
- At the Gates
- Atheist
- Atrocity
- Atrophia Red Sun
- Autokrator
- Autopsy
- Autopsy Torment
- Avulsed
- Axis of Advance

=== B ===
- Baest
- Babymetal
- Battlelore
- Becoming the Archetype
- Beheaded
- Behemoth
- Belphegor
- Benea Reach
- Beneath the Massacre
- Benediction
- Benighted
- The Berzerker
- Bestial Warlust
- Between the Buried and Me
- Beyond the Sixth Seal
- Big Dumb Face
- Bilocate
- Black Breath
- The Black Dahlia Murder
- Blinded Colony
- Blo.Torch
- Blood Duster
- Blood Red Throne
- Blood Stain Child
- Bloodbath
- Bolt Thrower
- Born of Osiris
- Brain Drill
- Bring Me the Horizon
- Brodequin
- Broken Hope
- Brujeria
- Brutality
- Brutal Truth

=== C ===
- Cadacross
- Cadaver
- Callenish Circle
- Cancer
- Candiria
- Caninus
- Cannibal Corpse
- Capharnaum
- Carbonized
- Carcass
- Cardinal Sin
- Carnage
- Carnival in Coal
- Cattle Decapitation
- Cavalera Conspiracy
- Celtic Frost
- Cemetary
- Cenotaph
- Centinex
- Cephalic Carnage
- Ceremonial Oath
- Chain Collector
- Changer
- The Chasm
- Children of Bodom
- Circle of Dead Children
- Coldworker
- Comecon
- Concrete Winds
- The Concubine
- Consolation
- Coprofago
- The County Medical Examiners
- Cradle of Filth
- Criminal
- The Crimson Armada
- Crimson Moonlight
- Crimson Thorn
- Crionics
- The Crown
- Cryogenic
- Crypta
- Cryptic Shift
- Cryptopsy
- Cynic

=== D ===
- Dååth
- Damaged
- Dance Club Massacre
- Dark Age
- Dark Heresy
- Dark Lunacy
- Dark Tranquillity
- Darkest Hour
- Darkthrone
- Dawn of Azazel
- Daylight Dies
- Dead Horse
- Dead Infection
- Deadlock
- Death
- Death Breath
- Death Organ
- Death Requisite
- Deathbound
- Deathchain
- Debauchery
- Decadence
- Decapitated
- Deceased
- Decrepit Birth
- Deeds of Flesh
- Defeated Sanity
- Defecation
- Defleshed
- Deicide
- Demigod
- Demilich
- Demiricous
- Demon Hunter
- Demonic Resurrection
- Demonoid
- Desangre
- Desecration
- Despised Icon
- Despite
- Destroy Destroy Destroy
- Desultory
- Dethklok
- Detonation
- Deuteronomium
- Devian
- DevilDriver
- Devilish Impressions
- Devolved
- Devourment
- Dew-Scented
- Diablo
- Diabolic
- Dia de los Muertos
- Die Apokalyptischen Reiter
- Dies Irae
- Dim Mak
- Dimension Zero
- Diocletian
- Dir En Grey
- Disarmonia Mundi
- Disbelief
- Disembowelment
- Disentomb
- Disgorge
- Disharmonic Orchestra
- Disillusion
- Disincarnate
- Disinterment
- Diskreet
- Dismember
- Dispatched
- Dissection
- Distorted
- Divine Heresy
- Dominus
- Dr. Shrinker
- Drottnar
- The Duskfall
- Dying Fetus

=== E ===
- Ebony Tears
- Edge of Sanity
- Elysia
- Elysium
- Embalmer
- Embodiment 12:14
- Embodyment
- Ensiferum
- Entombed
- Epoch of Unlight
- Eternal Lord
- Eternal Oath
- Eternal Tears of Sorrow
- Eucharist
- Evoken
- Ex Deo
- Exhumed
- Expulsion
- Extol
- Extreme Noise Terror

=== F ===
- Face Down
- The Faceless
- Falchion
- Farmakon
- Fear Factory
- Fear My Thoughts
- Festerday
- Fission
- Fleshcrawl
- Fleshgod Apocalypse
- Fragments of Unbecoming
- From the Shallows
- Frontside
- Frozen Soul
- The Funeral Pyre

=== G ===
- Gandalf
- Gates of Ishtar
- The Gathering
- Gehenna
- General Surgery
- Ghost Brigade
- Ghoul
- Glass Casket
- Goatlord
- Goatwhore
- God Dethroned
- God Forbid
- God Macabre
- Godgory
- Gojira
- Gone Postal
- Goreaphobia
- Gorefest
- Gorelord
- Gorerotted
- Gorguts
- Gory Blister
- Grave
- Graves of Valor
- Grenouer
- Grief of War
- Grotesque
- Gut
- Gutalax
- Gutworm

=== H ===
- Hacride
- Haemorrhage
- Haggard
- Hail of Bullets
- Hate
- Hate Eternal
- Hatebeak
- Hatesphere
- The Haunted
- Hearse
- Heaven Shall Burn
- Hecate Enthroned
- Hellhammer
- Helltrain
- Hibernus Mortis
- Hollenthon
- Hooded Menace
- Human
- Human Remains
- Hybrid
- Hypocrisy

=== I ===
- Ignominious Incarceration
- Illdisposed
- Immolation
- Immortal Souls
- Impaled
- Impaled Nazarene
- Impending Doom
- Impetigo
- Impious
- In Battle
- In Flames
- In Mourning
- In-Quest
- Incantation
- Inevitable End
- Infant Annihilator
- Infernäl Mäjesty
- Inhumate
- Inhume
- Iniquity
- Insision
- Insomnium
- Internal Bleeding
- Into Eternity
- Into the Moat

=== J ===
- Job for a Cowboy
- Jungle Rot

=== K ===
- Kaamos
- Kalmah
- Kanonenfieber
- Kataklysm
- Katalepsy
- Katatonia
- Kekal
- Killing Addiction
- Kitchen Knife Conspiracy
- Kittie
- Knights of the Abyss
- Konkhra
- Krabathor
- Krisiun
- Kronos

== See also ==
- List of death metal bands, L–Z
- List of blackened death metal bands
- List of Christian death metal bands
- List of deathcore artists
- List of death-doom bands
- List of deathgrind bands
- List of melodic death metal bands
- List of Florida death metal bands
- List of goregrind bands
- List of Swedish death metal bands
- List of technical death metal bands
