= List of death metal bands, L–Z =

This is a list of death metal bands (listed by letters L through Z). It includes bands that have at some stage in their career played within the style of death metal, or one of its sub- or fusion genres; as such there will inevitably be a certain amount of overlap with the list of melodic death metal bands, the list of Swedish death metal bands, and others.

The remaining list can be found at List of death metal bands, !–K.

== List ==
=== L ===
- Lamb of God
- Last Days of Humanity
- Legion of the Damned
- Leng Tch'e
- Liers in Wait
- Liquid Graveyard
- Living Sacrifice
- Lock Up
- Lorna Shore
- Lost Soul
- Loudblast
- Lyzanxia

=== M ===
- Macabre
- Malefice
- Malignancy
- Malevolent Creation
- Manimal
- Marionette
- Martyr
- Massacra
- Massacre
- Master
- Mendeed
- Mental Horror
- Mercenary
- Merciless
- Merlin
- Meshuggah
- Messiah
- Mindscar
- Misanthrope
- Miseration
- Misery
- Misery Index
- Mistress
- Molotov Solution
- Monstrosity
- Morbid
- Morbid Angel
- Morgion
- Morgoth
- Morphia
- Morpheus Descends
- Mors Principium Est
- Mortem
- Mortician
- Mortification
- Mr. Bungle
- Murder Squad
- My Dying Bride
- Mygrain
- Myrkskog

=== N ===
- Nahemah
- Napalm Death
- Nasum
- Neaera
- Necare
- Necrophagia
- Necrophagist
- Necrophobic
- Necros Christos
- Nefastus Dies
- Nefilim
- Nembrionic
- Neptune
- Neuraxis
- Nightfall
- Nightrage
- Nights Like These
- Nihilist
- Nile
- Nocturnus
- Nonexist
- Norma Jean
- Norther
- Noumena
- Novembre
- Nuclear Death

=== O ===
- Obituary
- Obscene Eulogy
- Obscura
- Oceano
- October Tide
- Odious Mortem
- Old Man's Child
- Omnium Gatherum
- On Thorns I Lay
- One Man Army and the Undead Quartet
- Opeth
- Ophiolatry
- Oppressor
- Opprobrium
- Order from Chaos
- Origin
- Orphaned Land
- Otep

=== P ===
- Paganizer
- Panzerchrist
- Paradise Lost
- Paths of Possession
- Pavor
- PeelingFlesh
- Persefone
- Pestilence
- Pig Destroyer
- Pissgrave
- Portal
- Possessed
- Prayer for Cleansing
- The Project Hate MCMXCIX
- Psycroptic
- Pungent Stench
- Purgatory
- Pyogenesis

=== Q ===
- Quo Vadis

=== R ===
- Raise Hell
- Raintime
- Rapture
- Rebaelliun
- The Red Chord
- The Red Death
- The Red Shore
- Regurgitate
- Renascent
- Resurrection
- Revocation
- Ripping Corpse
- Rotten Sound
- Rudra
- Runemagick

=== S ===
- Sacrificium
- Sadist
- Sadistic Intent
- Sadistik Exekution
- Sadus
- Salt the Wound
- Sanguisugabogg
- Sarcófago
- Satariel
- Saturnus
- Scar Symmetry
- Scarve
- Schaliach
- Sceptic
- Scour
- Sculptured
- Seance
- Sentenced
- Septicflesh
- Sepultura
- Severe Torture
- Shadows Fall
- Sinate
- Sinister
- Six Feet Under
- Skinless
- Skyfire
- Slaughter
- Soilent Green
- Soilwork
- Solamors
- Solution .45
- Sonic Syndicate
- Sons of Azrael
- Sotajumala
- Soul Demise
- Soul Embraced
- Soulburn
- Soulfly
- Spawn of Possession
- Stovokor
- Strapping Young Lad
- Success Will Write Apocalypse Across the Sky
- Suicide Silence
- Suffocation
- Swallow the Sun
- Switchblade
- Sylosis
- Sympathy

=== T ===
- Tenet
- Terror 2000
- Terrorizer
- Terrorust
- Testament
- Thanatos
- Therion
- Thirdmoon
- This Ending
- Thorr's Hammer
- Threat Signal
- Through the Eyes of the Dead
- Thy Disease
- Tiamat
- Torture Killer
- Torture Squad
- Trap Them
- Tribulation
- Tristwood

=== U ===
- Umbra Vitae
- Unanimated
- Underoath
- Unleashed

=== V ===
- Vader
- Vastum
- Veil of Maya
- Venom Prison
- Vile
- Visceral Bleeding
- Vital Remains
- Vomitory
- Vorkreist

=== W ===
- Waltari
- Wayd
- Whitechapel
- Winter
- With Blood Comes Cleansing

=== X ===
- Xavlegbmaofffassssitimiwoamndutroabcwapwaeiippohfffx
- Xenomorph
- Xysma

=== Y ===
- Yyrkoon

=== Z ===
- Zao
- Zonaria
- Zyklon

== See also ==
- List of death metal bands, !–K
- List of blackened death metal bands
- List of Christian death metal bands
- List of deathcore artists
- List of death-doom bands
- List of deathgrind bands
- List of melodic death metal bands
- List of Florida death metal bands
- List of goregrind bands
- List of Swedish death metal bands
- List of technical death metal bands
