= List of death metal bands =

Lists of death metal bands can be found at:

- List of American death metal bands
- List of death metal bands, !–K
- List of death metal bands, L–Z
- List of blackened death metal bands
- List of Christian death metal bands
- List of death-doom bands
- List of deathcore artists
- List of deathgrind bands
- List of Florida death metal bands
- List of goregrind bands
- List of melodic death metal bands
- List of Swedish death metal bands
- List of technical death metal bands
- List of war metal bands
