= List of melodic death metal bands =

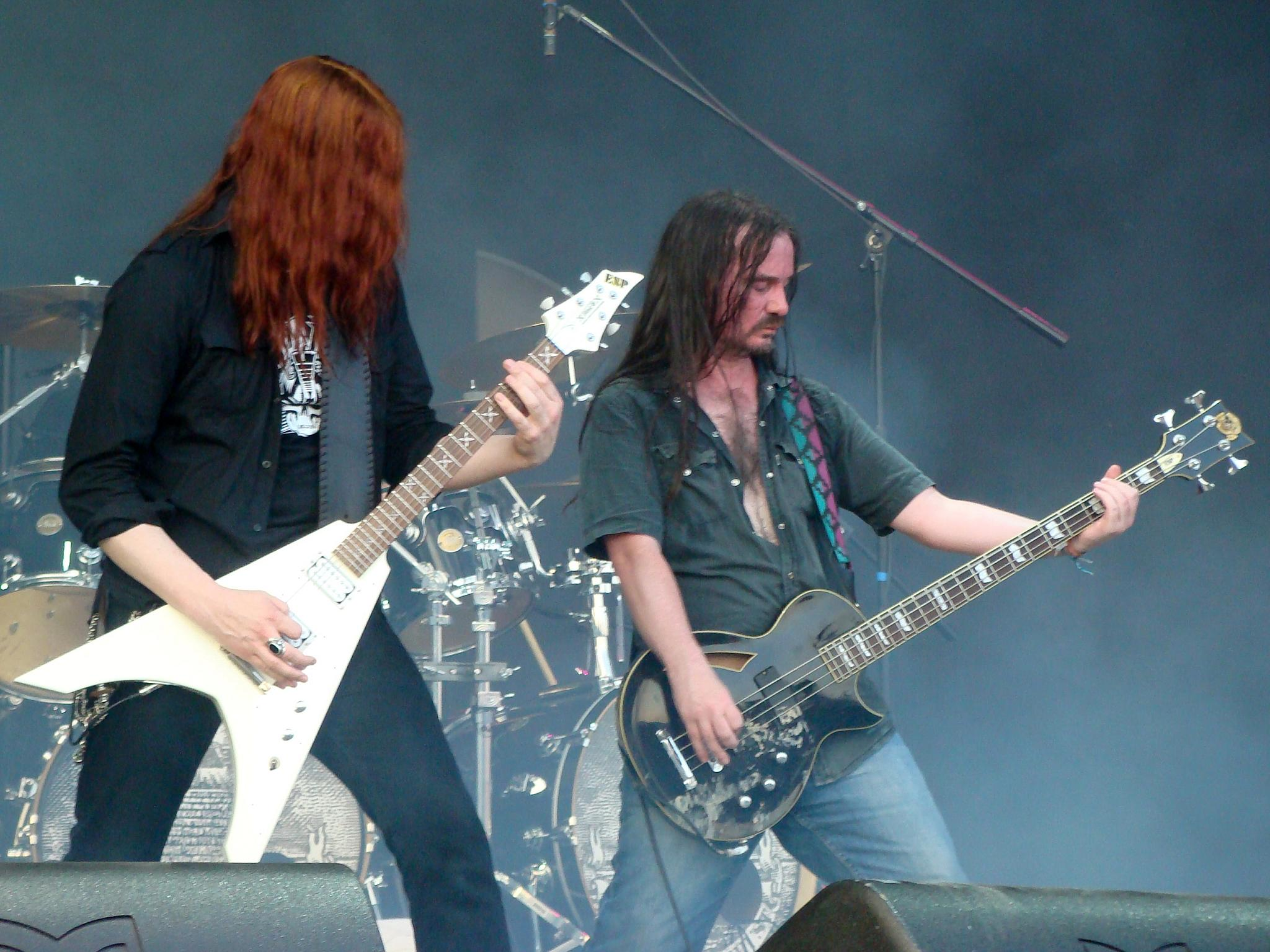
The British band Carcass helped define the melodic death metal genre with their 1993 album Heartwork.

This is a list of melodic death metal bands. Melodic death metal is a heavy metal music style that combines elements from the new wave of British heavy metal with elements of death metal. The term "Gothenburg metal" is often used to describe bands associated with or stylistically similar to the melodic death metal scene that originated around Gothenburg, Sweden.

| Band | Formed | Origin | Notes |
|---|---|---|---|
| The Absence | 2002 | United States | |
| An Abstract Illusion | 2007 | Sweden | |
| Act of Denial | 2020 | International (Croatia, Sweden, Austria, United States) | |
| Æther Realm | 2010 | United States | |
| The Agonist | 2004 | Canada | |
| Amaranthe | 2008 | Sweden | |
| Amon Amarth | 1992 | Sweden | |
| Amorphis | 1990 | Finland | |
| Anterior | 2003 | United Kingdom | |
| Arch Enemy | 1996 | Sweden | |
| Arghoslent | 1990 | United States | |
| Armageddon | 1997 | Sweden | |
| Arsis | 2000 | United States | |
| As I Lay Dying | 2000 | United States | |
| At the Gates | 1990 | Sweden | |
| At the Throne of Judgment | 2005 | United States | |
| Atrophia Red Sun | 1994 | Poland | |
| Avatar | 2001 | Sweden | |
| Battlecross | 2003 | United States | |
| Be'lakor | 2004 | Australia | |
| Before the Dawn | 1999 | Finland | |
| Beyond the Embrace | 2000 | United States | |
| Beyond the Sixth Seal | 1998 | United States | |
| The Black Dahlia Murder | 2001 | United States | |
| The Blinded | 2000 | Sweden | |
| Bloodred Hourglass | 2005 | Finland | |
| Blood Stain Child | 1999 | Japan | |
| Brymir | 2006 | Finland | |
| Callenish Circle | 1992 | Netherlands | |
| Carcass | 1986 | United Kingdom | |
| Carnal Forge | 1997 | Sweden | |
| Centinex | 1990 | Sweden | |
| Ceremonial Oath | 1989 | Sweden | |
| Chain Collector | 2003 | Norway | |
| Children of Bodom | 1993 | Finland | |
| Cipher System | 1995 | Sweden | |
| Crematory | 1991 | Germany | |
| Cypecore | 2008 | Germany | |
| Dark Age | 1995 | Germany | |
| Dark Lunacy | 1997 | Italy | |
| Dark Tranquillity | 1989 | Sweden | |
| Darkane | 1991 | Sweden | |
| Darkest Hour | 1995 | United States | |
| Deadlock | 1997 | Germany | |
| Death | 1984 | United States | |
| Decadence | 2003 | Sweden | |
| Despite | 1998 | Sweden | |
| Destroy Destroy Destroy | 2003 | United States | |
| Dethklok | 2006 | United States | |
| Detonation | 1997 | Netherlands | |
| Deus Ex Machina | 2004 | Singapore | |
| DevilDriver | 2002 | United States | |
| Diablo | 1995 | Finland | |
| Dimension Zero | 1995 | Sweden | |
| Disarmonia Mundi | 2000 | Italy | |
| Disillusion | 1994 | Germany | |
| Dissection | 1989 | Sweden | |
| Divine Heresy | 2005 | United States | |
| The Duskfall | 1999 | Sweden | |
| Ebony Tears | 1996 | Sweden | |
| Edge of Sanity | 1989 | Sweden | |
| Engel | 2005 | Sweden | |
| Eternal Tears of Sorrow | 1994 | Finland | |
| Eucharist | 1989 | Sweden | |
| Eye of the Enemy | 2006 | Australia | |
| The Eyes of a Traitor | 2006 | United Kingdom | |
| Falchion | 2002 | Finland | |
| Fear My Thoughts | 1998 | Germany | |
| Fragments of Unbecoming | 2000 | Germany | |
| The Funeral Pyre | 2001 | United States | |
| Gandalf | 1993 | Finland | |
| Gardenian | 1996 | Sweden | |
| Gates of Ishtar | 1992 | Sweden | |
| Ghost Brigade | 2005 | Finland | |
| Glass Casket | 2001 | United States | |
| The Halo Effect | 2021 | Sweden | |
| Hatesphere | 2000 | Denmark | |
| The Haunted | 1996 | Sweden | |
| Heaven Shall Burn | 1996 | Germany | |
| Hypocrisy | 1990 | Sweden | |
| Immortal Souls | 1991 | Finland | |
| In Flames | 1990 | Sweden | |
| In Mourning | 2000 | Sweden | |
| Insomnium | 1997 | Finland | |
| Into Eternity | 1997 | Canada | |
| Kalmah | 1998 | Finland | |
| Kataklysm | 1991 | Canada | |
| Light This City | 2002 | United States | |
| Luna Mortis | 2004 | United States | |
| Mendeed | 2000 | United Kingdom | |
| Mercenary | 1991 | Denmark | |
| Mors Principium Est | 1999 | Finland | |
| Mygrain | 2004 | Finland | |
| Neptune | 1999 | Italy | |
| Neuraxis | 1994 | Canada | |
| Nightfall | 1991 | Greece | |
| Nightrage | 2000 | Greece | |
| Noumena | 1998 | Finland | |
| Norther | 1996 | Finland | |
| Obscurity | 1997 | Germany | |
| Omnium Gatherum | 1996 | Finland | |
| Orbit Culture | 2013 | Sweden | |
| Pain Confessor | 2002 | Finland | |
| Parasite Inc. | 2007 | Germany | |
| Persefone | 2001 | Andorra | |
| Raintime | 1999 | Italy | |
| Rifftera | 2010 | Finland | |
| Scar Symmetry | 2004 | Sweden | |
| Shadows Fall | 1995 | United States | |
| The Showdown | 1999 | United States | |
| Skyfire | 1995 | Sweden | |
| Soilwork | 1995 | Sweden | |
| Solution .45 | 2008 | Sweden | |
| Sonic Syndicate | 2002 | Sweden | |
| Suidakra | 1994 | Germany | |
| Switchblade | 2001 | Australia | |
| Sylosis | 2000 | United Kingdom | |
| Thirdmoon | 1994 | Austria | |
| This Ending | 1991 | Sweden | |
| Threat Signal | 2003 | Canada | |
| Through the Eyes of the Dead | 2003 | United States | |
| Unanimated | 1988 | Sweden | |
| The Unguided | 2010 | Sweden | |
| Vardøger | 1994 | Norway | |
| Varg | 2005 | Germany | |
| Warmen | 2000 | Finland | |
| Wintersun | 2003 | Finland | |
| With Passion | 2002 | United States | |
| Within Y | 2002 | Sweden | |
| Yyrkoon | 1995 | France | |
| Zonaria | 2002 | Sweden | |

== See also ==
- Melodic death metal
- List of heavy metal bands
- List of extreme metal bands
- Heavy metal genres
