= Blowtorch (disambiguation) =

A blowtorch (also referred to as a blowlamp), is a fuel-burning tool used for applying flame and heat to various applications, usually metalworking.

Blowtorch may refer to:

== Tools ==
- A cutting torch used for cutting metal, often used to mean any oxy-fuel welding and cutting torch
- A certain application for a blowpipe

== Other uses ==
- A powerful radio station, especially a clear channel broadcaster
- Blowtorch (G.I. Joe), a fictional character in the G.I. Joe universe

== See also ==
- Blo.Torch, a melodic death metal band from The Hague, Netherlands
  - Blo.Torch (album), a 1999 album by the band
