= Xenomorph (disambiguation) =

The Xenomorph (Greek for "a strange form, an alien creature") is the main fictional antagonist in the Alien franchise, and can be used more generally to refer to extraterrestrials.

Xenomorph may also refer to:

- Xenomorph (geology), a mineral that did not develop its external crystal form
- Xenomorph (video game), a 1990 science-fiction role-playing video game
- Xenomorph (band), a Dutch death metal band formed in 1994
- Xenomorph, a fictional creature on the 1988 television series Something Is Out There
- Xenomorphia, a genus of parasitoid wasp
- Zerg, initially called Xenomorphs before the game
