= Xavlegbmaofffassssitimiwoamndutroabcwapwaeiippohfffx =

South African death metal band

- The logo of Xavlegbmaofffassssitimiwoamndutroabcwapwaeiippohfffx

Background information
- Also known as: Xavleg
- Origin: Durban, South Africa
- Genres: Slam death metal; deathcore; deathgrind
- Years active: 2016–present
- Members: Duncan Bentley; Byron Dunwoody; Kris Xenopoulos

Xavlegbmaofffassssitimiwoamndutroabcwapwaeiippohfffx, often abbreviated as Xavleg (/ˈzæv.lɛɡ/, ZAV-lehg) and sometimes styled with capitalization of the final "x" in the name, is a South African death metal band known for their brutal style and comedic themes involving Internet memes and graphic violence.

== History ==
Xavlegbmaofffassssitimiwoamndutroabcwapwaeiippohfffx was formed in 2016 by members of the Durban-based deathcore band Vulvodynia, driven by a shared passion for extreme metal and an interest in blending horror and humour with their music.

The band released their debut EP, Gore, in 2016. In 2018, they followed it up with their debut full-length album, Gore 2.0, a single, Invoke the Smoke, and a 5-track EP titled Hippopotomonstrosesquippedaliophobia in 2025 The members of the band are Duncan Bentley.

== Musical style ==
Xavlegbmaofffassssitimiwoamndutroabcwapwaeiippohfffx plays brutal death metal, particularly slam death metal, an aggressive microgenre of death metal characterized by its heavy, down-tuned sound and breakneck rhythmic patterns.

== Band name ==
Xavlegbmaofffassssitimiwoamndutroabcwapwaeiippohfffx's name is a 52-letter abbreviation for "Acidic Vaginal Liquid Explosion Generated by Mass Amounts of Filthy Fecal Fisting and Sadistic Septic Syphilic Sodomy Inside the Infected Maggot Infested Womb of a Molested Nun Dying Under the Roof of a Burning Church While a Priest Watches and Ejaculates in Immense Perverse Pleasure Over His First Fresh Fetus", with an "X" on either side, reminiscent of a 2000's gamertag. The extreme name has resulted in the band receiving online attention and becoming an Internet meme. On 6 December 2016, the band's logo was nominated the "Completely Unreadable Band Logo of the Week" by news website MetalSucks.

== Discography ==
- Gore (EP) – 2016
- Gore 2.0 (album) – 2018
- Invoke the Smoke (single) – 2018
- Hippopotomonstrosesquippedaliophobia (EP) – 2025

== See also ==
- List of death metal bands
