= Perfection and Failure =

Studio album by Neptune
- Released: 2004
- Recorded: Summer 2004
- Studio: Tobacco Road Studios
- Genre: Melodic death metal
- Length: 35:43
- Label: Neptunedeath Productions, distributed by Benzoworld
- Producer: Giulio Corbelli, Francesco Moro, Alessio de Antoni

Neptune chronology
Synthbreed (2002)	Perfection and Failure (2004)	Acts of Supremacy (2007)

Professional ratings
Review scores
Source	Rating
MetalItalia	link (Italian)
HardSounds	link (Italian)

Perfection and Failure is the debut studio album by the Italian melodic death metal band Neptune, released by the band's own label Neptunedeath Productions and distributed by Benzoworld.

== Track listing ==
1. "Introducing Apocalypse"
2. "Scratched Avantgarde Dream"
3. "Animal Trial Experiments"
4. "Breathing New Element"
5. "Unproject Holocaust"
6. "Angel Factory Avaria"
7. "Perfection and Failure"

== Personnel ==
Band members

- Andrea Mameli − guitars
- Mattia Nidini − death vocals
- Francesco Adami − bass
- Corrado Zoccatelli − drums
- Francesco Moro − guitars
- Alessio De Antoni − keyboards

Other

- Graphics layout by Mattia Nidini at www.EastAsiaIndustries.com.
