= The Severed Inception =

Studio album by Inevitable End
- Released: March 17, 2009
- Recorded: 2007
- Genre: Technical death metal, grindcore
- Length: 34:04
- Label: Relapse Records

Professional ratings
Review scores
Source	Rating
Metal-Temple	3.5/5 stars
Blabbermouth	7.5/10 stars

The Severed inception is the debut album by death metal band Inevitable End. It was released on March 17, 2009 through Relapse Records

== Overview ==
During the first few days of 2009 Inevitable End released the track listing for their highly anticipated debut album entitled The Severed Inception which includes songs "Persevering Incitement", "Embracing the Origin", and "Collapse in Reverse". They released the songs "The Severed Inception" and "Dreamsight Synopsis" to their Myspace and played three shows in Sweden in support of the release.

== Track listing ==
No.	Title	Length
1.	"The Severed Inception"	4:04
2.	"Dreamsight Synopsis"	3:33
3.	"Embracing the Origin"	4:28
4.	"Persevering Incitement"	4:11
5.	"Collapse in Reverse"	3:43
6.	"Distorted"	1:03
7.	"Firstborn of All Dead"	4:06
8.	"Apprentice Luminous Acquaintance"	4:12
9.	"The Art of Corruption"	4:40

== Personnel ==
- Andres Gerden – Vocals
- Marcus Bertilsson – Guitar
- Johan Ylenstrand – Bass guitar
- Joakim Malmborg – Drums
