= Acts of Supremacy (album) =

Studio album by Neptune
- Released: 11 April 2008
- Recorded: 2007
- Studio: dB Studios
- Genre: Melodic death metal
- Length: 48:12
- Label: Noisehead
- Producer: Ettore Rigotti

Neptune chronology
Perfection and Failure (2004)	Acts of Supremacy (2008)

Acts of Supremacy is the second full-length studio album by the Italian melodic death metal band Neptune. It was released on 11 April 2008 through Noisehead Records and was distributed by Relapse Records in North America. A video was made for the song "Machinegun Revolution".

== Track listing ==
1. "Stereogram of Convulsion" − 5:24
2. "Gearsouls' Supremacy" − 5:05
3. "Sterile Gods" − 4:55
4. "Machinegun Revolution" − 4:48
5. "Dormant Slaves' Resurrection" − 5:56
6. "Black Monolith Sunrise" − 5:24
7. "Kevlar-B48" − 5:47
8. "Cluster" − 4:08
9. "Disequilibrium" − 6:45

== Personnel ==
- Mattia Nidini − vocals
- Francesco Moro − guitar
- Andrea Mameli − guitar
- Francesco Adami − bass
- Corrado Zoccatelli − drums
