= Shadows of Paragon =

- Also known as: Allsherjar (2001-2003)
- Origin: Skåne, Sweden
- Genres: Christian metal, Unblack metal, Black metal, Death metal
- Years active: 2001-present
- Label: Independent
- Members: David Rönnlund; Jörundr; Linus Bergman; Zharlie Sambeko (formerly Gustavsson); Arvid Borg
- Past members: Joel Oredsson; Joakim; Karg; Christoffer Johansson
- Website: Shadows of Paragon on Facebook

Shadows of Paragon is an Unblack metal band that originated in Sweden in 2001 under the moniker, Allsherjar. The band has played in Sweden the Netherlands, Norway, Mexico, Germany, Switzerland and Belgium.

== Background ==
Shadows of Paragon formed in 2001 under the name Allsherjar. The band changed the name in 2003, and have been active since. The band released a demo in 2004 before having Keyboardist Jocke Bergkvist depart from the band. Before recording further, Drummer Joel Oredsson quit being replaced by Inevitable End drummer Christoffer Johansson. The band released an EP in 2008 and a Studio album in 2009. 2014 saw the departure of both Vocalist Karg and Johansson. The band is currently recording their sophomore album, with their new drummer, Arvid.

The band announced in 2021 that their sophomore album, Amendment, would be able to be released, after 12 years of long work. The album would be produced by Zharlie Sambeko and Fredrik Bergman out of Svartkog Productions. The new album would feature newer members David Rönnlund on vocals and Arvid Borg on drums.

== Members ==
Current

- David Rönnlund - vocals (2019–present)
- Fredrik "Jörundr" Bergman - bass (2001–present)
- Linus Bergman - guitar (2001–present)
- Zharlie Sambeko - guitar (2001–present)
- Arvid Borg - drums (2016–present)

Former

- Kristoffer "Karg" Petersson - vocals (2001–2014)
- Christoffer Johansson - drums (2007–2014)
- Joel Oredsson - drums (2001–2007)
- Jocke Bergkvist - keyboards (2001–2004)

Timeline

== Discography ==
EPs

- Shadows of Paragon (2004)
- Fear of Being Forever Lost (2008)

Studio albums

- Through the Valley Within (2009)
- Amendment (2021)
