= List of death-doom bands =

This is a list of bands that play death-doom, a fusion of death metal and doom metal.

== List of bands ==
Band	Country	Formed	Notes
1914	Ukraine	2014	
Acid Witch	USA	2007	
Akem Manah	USA	2009	
Amorphis	Finland	1990	
Anathema	UK	1990	
Antestor	Norway	1990	
Asphyx	Netherlands	1987	
Autopsy	USA	1987	
Beyond Dawn	Norway	1990	
Corrupted	Japan	1994	
Cultic	USA	2016	
Daylight Dies	USA	1996	
Disembowelment	Australia	1989	
Draconian	Sweden	1994	
Drottnar	Norway	1996	
Esoteric	UK	1992	
The Eternal	Australia	2004	
Evoken	USA	1994	
Forest Stream	Russia	1995	
Funeral	Norway	1991	
The Gathering	Netherlands	1989	
Hamferð	Faroe Islands	2008	
Hooded Menace	Finland	2007	
Incantation	USA	1989	
Katatonia	Sweden	1991	
Mindrot	USA	1989	
Morgion	USA	1990	
My Dying Bride	UK	1990	
Necare	USA	1997	
Necros Christos	Germany	2001	
Novembers Doom	USA	1989	
October Tide	Sweden	1995	
Officium Triste	Netherlands	1994	
On Thorns I Lay	Greece	1992	
Opera IX	Italy	1988	
Orphaned Land	Israel	1991	
Pantheist	Belgium / UK	2000	
Paradise Lost	UK	1988	
Paramaecium	Australia	1990	
Pyogenesis	Germany	1991	
Rapture	Finland	1997	
Runemagick	Sweden	1990	
Saturnus	Denmark	1991	
Skepticism	Finland	1991	
Swallow the Sun	Finland	2000	
Thergothon	Finland	1990	
The Prophecy	UK	2001	
The Third and the Mortal	Norway	1992	
Thorr's Hammer	USA	1994	
Tiamat	Sweden	1987	
Thurisaz	Belgium	1997	
Unearthly Trance	USA	2000	
Unholy	Finland	1990	
Visceral Evisceration	Austria	1991	
Winter	USA	1988	
