= Merlin (metal band) =

Russian death metal band

- Origin: Moscow, Russia
- Genres: Thrash metal, death metal, grindcore
- Years active: 1992–2009
- Labels: Grind it!, GWN, CD-Maximum
- Members: Maria Abaza; Alex Ioffe; Rinat; Vlad Vorona
- Past members: Nick Byckoff; Arteom "Bolt" Nazarov; Anatoly "Alchothron" Boychenko; Sergey "Psycho" Chebanov; Michael "Dead Head" Karpeyev
- Website: merlinmetal.com

Merlin is a death metal band from Russia, formed in 1992 in part by bassist and female growling vocalist Mary Abaza.

== History ==
Merlin was formed in 1992 by influential female vocalist and bassist Mary Abaza and renowned Russian guitarist Alex Ioffe. After a long search, they met drummer Nick Byckoff. Before Merlin, all three played in various styles from hard rock to thrash.^{{1}} The trio wanted a name that was original for a death metal band and easy to rememberer for fans, settling on "Merlin" as a symbol of magical power and majesty. Merlin is best known as the warlock featured in Arthurian legends and the musicians' revered his portrayal in the Stephen King book "The Dark Tower". A merlin is also a predatory bird that tears meat with its claws, a gory image the band reflects in its aesthetic. (Incidentally, in French, "merlin" translates to "heavy axe", "large hammer", or "poleaxe").

Mary Abaza is known for her broad vocal range, from contralto (the lowest female-coded singing range) to soprano (a high female-coded singing range, and the highest range for all voices). She was one of the first female growling vocalists in the world ^{{2}}.

Merlin's first demo, "Welcome to Hell" (1992), was initially played in a Death/Thrash style, but three months later they released the second demo, in more of a death/grind style. Their third demo, "Prisoner of Death" (1994), was better known. Fanzines worldwide wrote excited, favorable reviews^{{4}}. Since their first live performance in 1992, Merlin gained a reputation in Russia as a particularly aggressive band. After the release of their album Deathkoteque (1997), they were recognized as leaders in the Russian death metal scene. The record gained popularity as many of its tracks were included in compilations. One track, "Leave Me Alone", is dedicated to Black Sabbath, one of the bands that formed the roots of extreme metal. Erik Rutan (Morbid Angel, Hate Eternal), after listening to this album, remarked that few male vocalists match Abaza's vocal achievement ^{{5}}.

In September 2000, their second album, They Must Die, was released through Hobgoblin records (Russia) in MC format. In January 2001 it was re-released in CD format through Grind It! records, a division of Canada's Great White North Records, for the North-American territory and elsewhere in the world.

The band conducts concert activity and takes part in all considerable festivals and gigs around Moscow and some other Russian towns and was working on some new material for their up-coming third album "Brutal Constructor", scheduled to come out in 2003 on GWN. Everything would be perfect, Merlin was about to go on a European tour and at its height of recording the new album, the terrible misfortune had happened... On 13 July 2003 their drummer Nick Byckoff died in a car accident. It is an irreplaceable deprivation for the band, because during they played together Nick became like a brother to them. He was a brilliant drummer and his enormous technique amazed not only the audience, but the musicians, too... He was out of any competition; "This guy was fast, tight and intense as hell!"; many idolized him and were quiet right. Musicians still can't believe that it happened and it seems to them that he simply got tired and left for a while. It need to say that it was Nick who imposed on the band that extremely powerful sound which distinguished the band Merlin for all these years and owing to his incredible mastership they achieved those impossible speeds which drive Merlin's fans crazy ^{{7}}.

Their album "Brutal Constructor" was recording hard (May 2003 - January 2004). It was very painful to do something after Nick's death. Mary Abaza: "My voice vanished, because of nerves, a few times we lost the guitar tracks, besides the engineer got serious problems with health… kind of some mysticism, ya see." But at first they must finish this album "Brutal Constructor", moreover Nick Byckoff had time to record all drum parts for this album and it is still possible to hear Nick's magnificent and masterly work, so it was their duty before him to do their best. And they did it. In 2004, Merlin created a real masterpiece - the album "Brutal Constructor". This album contains 9 killer songs, a cover-version of "Zombie Ritual" by Death and a number on the music for the Sergei Eisenstein film "Alexander Nevsky", the cantata "Alexander Nevsky" (1938) created by genius Russian composer Sergei Prokofiev ^{{8}}. The musicians of Merlin were in earnest about their own interpretation of one of the most renowned cantatas of the 20th century, because Mary Abaza loves classical music very much, especially modern such as Dmitri Shostakovich and Alfred Schnittke and German composers such as Ludwig van Beethoven and Anton Bruckner. In general, music is Mary's family tradition. Her mother is professional pianist and Mary herself used to play the piano in the childhood^{{9}}. Among their ancestry, there were great composers. Such the influential composer of 20th century music as Igor Stravinsky was a cousin of her great grandfather. Also the author of a well-known romance "Утро туманное" [Utro Tumannoe] ("Foggy morning"), Russian pianist, composer of 19th century – Arkadiy Maximovich Abaza was her forefather ^{{10}}.

Thus, the album Brutal Constructor was recorded at Navaho Records during 2003. It was produced by Mary Abaza, Alex Ioffe and Les Disques Great White North enr. Merlin wanted the album to be as brutal as possible: "The music is in beyond the bounds of engineering capability". At the same time they managed to play it in their own Merlin style, extremely fast and intensive. This work appeared a deserving tribute to Nick's memory. Brutal Constructor has been included in "European Top 10" death metal albums of 2004.^{{11}}

And of late years Merlin's line-up changed. Their guitarist Arteom "Bolt" Nazarov, who had played during six years in the band, quit Merlin, but a short time later (January 2004) they had already had got a new guitar-player instead of Bolt, Sergey "Psycho" Chebanov.

== Band members ==
=== Current members ===
- Mary Abaza — vocals, bass, lyrics (1992–present)
- Alexander Ioffe — guitar (1992–present)
- Rinat — guitars (2008–present)
- Vlad "Ravendark" Vorona — drums (2007–present)

=== Former members ===
- Nick Byckoff — drums (1992–2003; died 2003)
- Arteom "Bolt" Nazarov — guitar (1998–2004)
- Anatoly "Alchothron" Boychenko — drums (2003–2007)
- Sergey "Psycho" Chebanov — guitar (2004–2006)
- Michael "Dead Head" Karpeyev — guitar (2006–2007)

== Discography ==
=== Studio albums ===
- 1997: Deathkoteque
- 2000: They Must Die
- 2004: Brutal Constructor

=== Demos ===
- 1992: "Welcome to Hell"
- 1992: "Die"
- 1994: "Prisoner of Death"
