= Kitchen Knife Conspiracy =

American heavy metal band

- Origin: Girard, Ohio, US
- Genres: Death metal; groove metal; nu metal (early)
- Years active: 1998-present
- Labels: Sin Klub Entertainment; Magic Milkshake Music; Deko Entertainment
- Members: Johnny Kihm; Fred Whitacre; Jeremy Cibella; Ian Pethlel; Rickie Palmer
- Past members: John Prosenjak; Kevin Lewis

The Kitchen Knife Conspiracy is an American extreme metal band formed in Girard, Ohio, in 1998. The band labels themselves "stompcore", blending death metal, hardcore, nu metal and thrash metal.

The band released Sin-Pathetic in 2000, produced by Sin Klub Entertainment. The band released the rest of their albums on their own independent label, Magic Milkshake Music. In 2025, they signed with Deko Entertainment and were set to release new material in 2026.

The band’s nu metal influences were far more prominent in their early releases, but became less noticeable by 2003’s Worst Case Scenario, as death metal influences became the band’s primary sound.

== Band members ==
Current

- Johnny Kihm - bass
- Fred Whitacre - drums
- Jeremy Cibella - guitar
- Ian Pethlel - vocals
- Rickie Palmer - guitar

Former

- John Prosenjak - vocals
- Kevin Lewis - guitar

== Discography ==
- Witchboard (1999)
- Sin-Pathetic (2000)
- Handicapitated (2001)
- Worst Case in Stereo (2003)
- A Friend in Need… is a Friend to Kill (2006)
- Seven Deadly Sins (2015)
