= Concrete Winds =

Finnish band

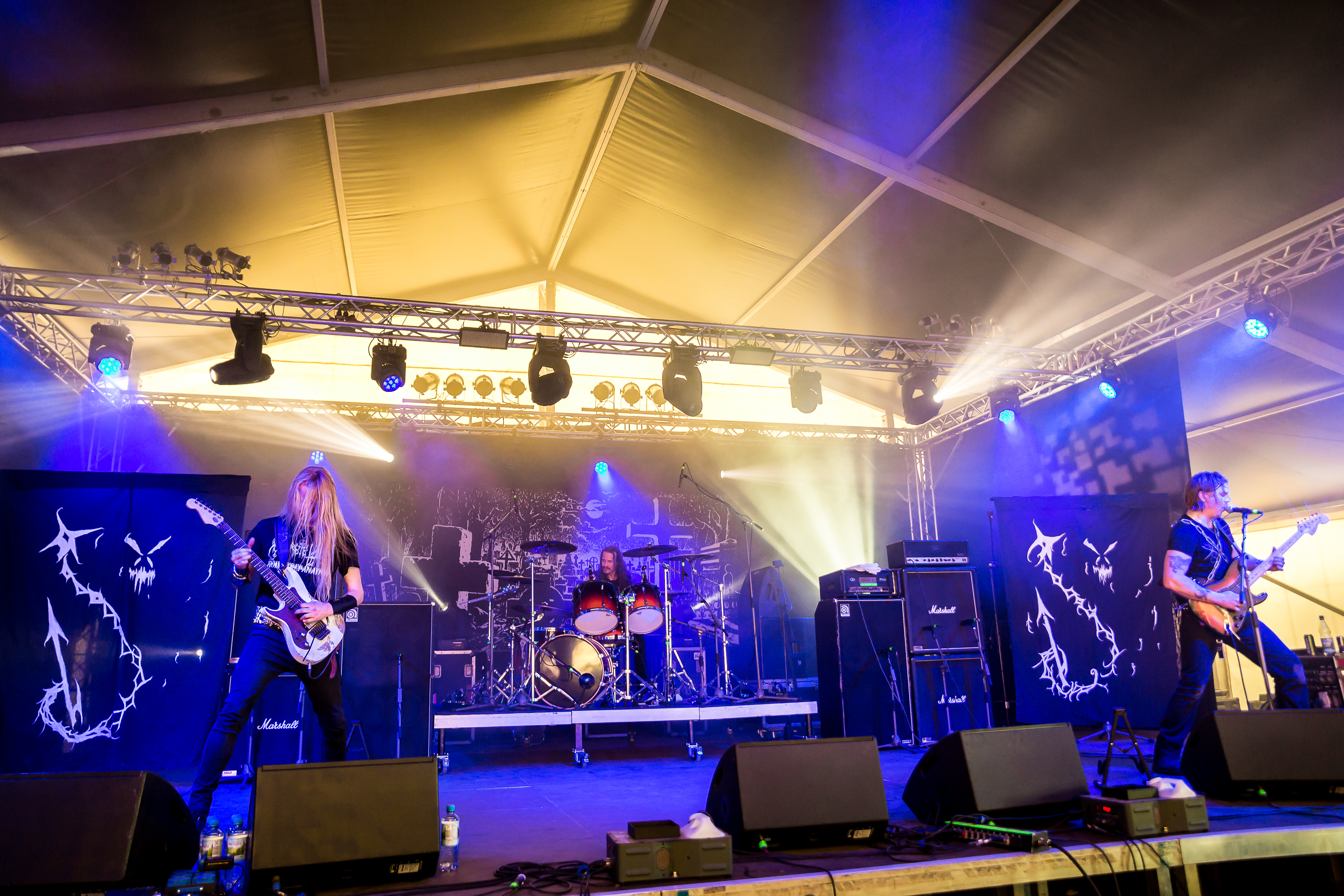
- Concrete Winds performing at Party.San Metal Open Air

Background information
- Origin: Finland
- Genres: Death metal, Deathgrind
- Years active: 2019 – active
- Label: Sepulchral Voice Records
- Members: PJ (Jonatan Johansson); Mikko Josefsson

Concrete Winds is a death metal / deathgrind band based in Finland.

== History ==
PJ (vocals/guitar) and Mikko (drums) formed Concrete Winds after the disbanding in 2018 of Ålandic death metal band VORUM, of which they were founding members.

The name of the band is taken from the first verses of VORUM's song "Current Mouth" : "On naked shores / By concrete winds deformed / Leaving into the waters / In its blackness enthralled".

In May 2019, their song "Infant Gallow" premiered online, announcing the existence of Concrete Winds.

According to an interview the band gave to Finnish zine Sinistrous Waves, "[...]When planning the start of the band, everything in our heads, no matter if it had to do with music, words or visuals, was fast/speed, brute force, loud, spikes, straightforward assault and more words and visions in this vein."

Their debut, "Primitive Force", was released on Sepulchral Voice Records on August 16, 2019.

The album, described by the label as "an epitome of violence and a prime example of how far extreme metal can be driven without losing the musical aspects", made an impact in the underground death metal scene, gaining the favor of extreme metal listeners and critical praise from several publications. Exclaim! wrote that on "Primitive Force" Concrete Winds "never loosen their grip, maintaining a startling level of energy that few bands can manifest, and which electrifies every facet of the music to become absolutely devastating", and Decibel Magazine, which premiered the full album stream a few days before its release, stated that it was " easily one of the most extreme records you’ll hear this year, and yet never once does Primitive Force become monotonous. It’s nonstop, don’t mistake that part, but it’s also astonishingly creative throughout".

The band played the first live shows in Finland in 2020, appearing as a trio with the addition of Finnish musician Mika Heinonen (previously in Finnish death metal band Obscure Burial) on second guitar and no bass player. As of 2024, this remains their live line-up.

In 2021, after appearing at Copenhagen's death metal festival Kill-Town Deathfest, Concrete Winds released their second full-length, Nerve Butcherer, on November 26, through Sepulchral Voice Records.

The album has been described by most critics as surpassing the previous one in ferocity and harshness, with definitions such as " raging inferno that will torture the souls of the unsuspecting victims in less than half hour of punishments and audio torture" and a "dose of pure madness in music form".

During 2022, Concrete Winds joined Finnish death metal band Demilich in November for the first half of their European tour, and played their first U.S. show at Saint Vitus in New York.

In 2023, the band took part in the "Agony & Ecstasy Over Europe" tour with Swiss death metal band Bölzer and Swedish black metal band Watain, then appeared both at local festivals in Finland as well as at some major international metal festivals such as Brutal Assault and Party.San Metal Open Air.

In early 2024, Concrete Winds announced to have joined booking agency Goetia Productions and currently are due to play at different festivals across Europe, including as headliners at the UK edition of Kill-Town Deathfest in October 2024.

At the end of June 2024, the band premiered the song "Infernal Repeater" from their third album, a self-titled work that has been released on August 30th, 2024, via Sepulchral Voice Records. As described by the label: "The album is rooted in outrageous speed, heaviest trembling rhythm passages, abysmal croaked curses, turbulent breaks, and repulsive shrieking leads which let you drown in a maelstrom of insanity. But this time, new layers are also added to the pandemonic universe, as weird staccato riffing sections bleed into witching industrial scenarios."

== Members ==
=== Current members ===
- PJ (Jonatan Johansson) – vocals, guitar (2019–present)
- Mikko Josefsson – drums (2019–present)

=== Live members ===
- Mika Heinonen – guitar (2020–present)

== Discography ==
=== Studio albums ===
- Primitive Force (Sepulchral Voice Records, 2019)
- Nerve Butcherer (Sepulchral Voice Records, 2021)
- Concrete Winds (Sepulchral Voice Records, 2024)
