= Blo.Torch (album) =

Studio album by Blo.Torch
- Released: 1999
- Genre: Melodic death metal
- Length: 53:26
- Label: Earache Records

Blo.Torch chronology
Blo.Torch (1999)	Volatile (2004)

Professional ratings
Review scores
Source	Rating
Allmusic	3/5 stars

Blo.Torch is the first album by the melodic death metal band Blo.Torch. It was released in 1999 on Earache Records.

== Track listing ==
No.	Title	Length
1.	"Spanish Sun"	6:06
2.	"Mount Ygman"	4:47
3.	"King of Karnage"	5:51
4.	"Inkblack Sky"	5:23
5.	"Panzerstorm"	5:02
6.	"Quatrain"	8:45
7.	"Seem to be the Enemy"	4:08
8.	"March of the Worm"	4:30
9.	"Bloodstains"	8:54
Total length:		53:26
