= List of blackened death metal bands =

This is a list of blackened death metal bands. Blackened death metal is a subgenre of heavy metal.

- Abominator
- Acheron
- Aeternus
- A Hill to Die Upon
- Anaal Nathrakh
- Akercocke
- The Amenta
- Angelcorpse
- Arkhon Infaustus
- Astarte
- Aurora Borealis
- Azarath
- Behemoth
- Belphegor
- Bölzer
- Crescent
- Crimson Moonlight
- Crionics
- Demonic Resurrection
- Devian
- Devilish Impressions
- Goatwhore
- Hate
- Hecate Enthroned
- Immortal Bird
- Kanonenfieber
- Kaoteon
- Lorna Shore
- Necrophobic
- Necrowretch
- Portal
- Revenge
- Rudra
- Sinsaenum
- Škan
- Slugdge
- Solace of Requiem
- Teitanblood
- Vesania
- Weapon
- Zyklon
