= Desangre =

Mexican death metal band

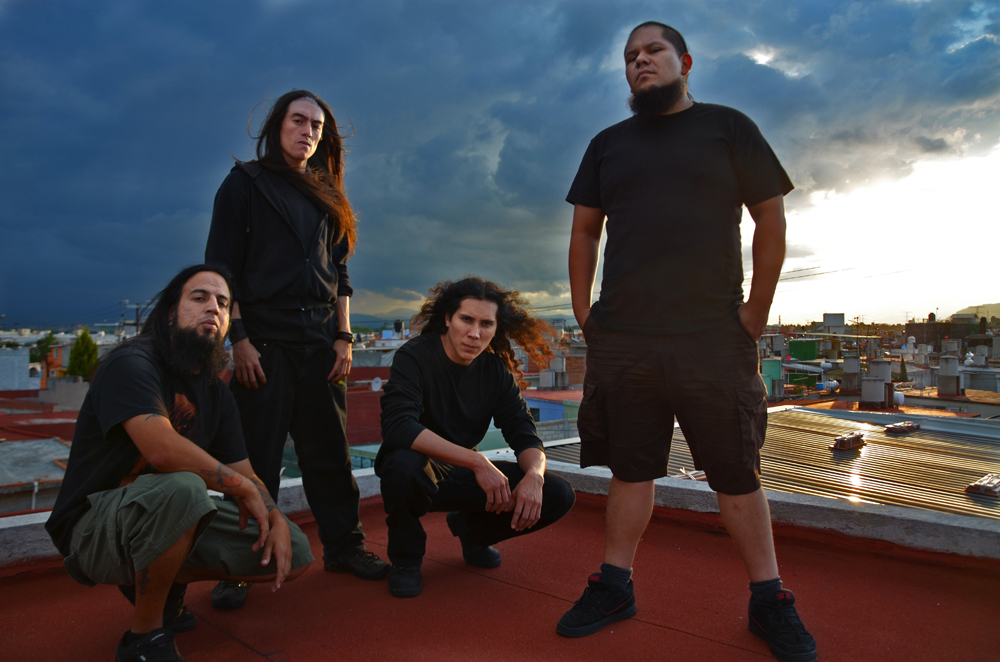

Background information
- Origin: Mexico
- Years active: 2006–present
- Label: Independent
- Members: Athal (guitar); Alka (vocals); J.M. Aldape (drums); Jhhon Bernal (bass)
- Past members: Osvaldo Rodríguez (bass)
- Website: www.facebook.com/DESANGRE

Desangre is a Mexican death metal/grindcore band formed in 2006.

== Discography ==
=== Full-length albums ===
- Solo Carniceria (2008)
- Resurreccion (2013)

=== EPs ===
- Eres Humano o Eres Basura (2012)
