= List of technical death metal bands =

This is a list of technical death metal bands. Technical death metal (sometimes called tech-death) is a musical subgenre of death metal music that focuses on complex rhythms, riffs and song structures.

Band	Country	Formed	References
7 Horns 7 Eyes	USA	2006	
Abnormality	USA	2005	
Aborted	Belgium	1995	
Abysmal Dawn	USA	2003	
Abysmal Torment	Malta	2000	
Aeon	Sweden	1999	
Anata	Sweden	1993	
Archspire	Canada	2007	
Arsis	USA	2000	
As They Sleep	USA	2003	
Atheist	USA	1984	
Augury	Canada	2001	
Becoming the Archetype	USA	1999	
Beneath the Massacre	Canada	2004	
Between the Buried and Me	USA	2000	
Beyond Creation	Canada	2005	
Blood Incantation	USA	2011	
Blotted Science	USA	2005	
Born of Osiris	USA	2003	
Brain Drill	USA	2005	
Cannibal Corpse	USA	1988	
Capharnaum	USA	1993	
Carcass	UK	1985	
Cephalic Carnage	USA	1992	
Circle of Contempt	Finland	2006	
The Contortionist	USA	2007	
Contrarian	USA	2012	
Coprofago	Chile	1993	
Cryptic Shift	UK	2013	
Cryptopsy	Canada	1992	
Cynic	USA	1987	
Deadsquad	Indonesia	2006	
Death	USA	1984	
Decapitated	Poland	1996	
Decrepit Birth	USA	2001	
Deeds of Flesh	USA	1993	
Defeated Sanity	Germany	1994	
Demilich	Finland	1990	
Desecravity	Japan	2007	
Divine Heresy	USA	2006	
Dying Fetus	USA	1991	
Entheos	USA	2015	
Extol	Norway	1994	
Fallujah	USA	2007	
The Faceless	USA	2004	
Fleshgod Apocalypse	Italy	2007	
Gojira	France	1996	
Gorod	France	1997	
Gorguts	Canada	1989	
Grimaze	Bulgaria	2013	
In Battle	Sweden	1996	
Into the Moat	USA	2001	
Knights of the Abyss	USA	2005	
Lost Soul	Poland	1990	
Malignancy	USA	1992	
Man Must Die	UK	2002	
Meshuggah	Sweden	1987	
Mindscar	USA	1998	
Monstrosity	USA	1990	
Necrophagist	Germany	1992	
Neuraxis	Canada	1994	
Ne Obliviscaris	Australia	2003	
Nile	USA	1993	
Nocturnus	USA	1988	
Obscura	Germany	2002	
Oppressor	USA	1991	
Origin	USA	1990	
Persefone	Andorra	2001	
Pestilence	Netherlands	1986	
Psycroptic	Australia	1999	
Pyrrhon	USA	2008	
Quo Vadis	Canada	1992	
The Red Chord	USA	1999	
Revocation	USA	2006	
Rings of Saturn	USA	2009	
Rivers of Nihil	USA	2009	
Sadist	Italy	1991	
Soreption	Sweden	2005	
Spawn of Possession	Sweden	1997	
Suffocation	USA	1989	
Through the Eyes of the Dead	USA	2003	
Trigger the Bloodshed	UK	2006	
Ulcerate	New Zealand	2000	
Visceral Bleeding	Sweden	1999	
Wormed	Spain	1998	
The Zenith Passage	USA	2012	
