= Anvil of Doom =

Spanish death metal band

- Origin: Jerez de la Frontera, Spain
- Genres: Death metal technical death metal melodic death metal
- Years active: 1999– 2014
- Members: Hugo; Matoto; Tzaraath; MG
- Website: www.anvilofdoom.com

Anvil of Doom was a death metal band from Andalusia, Spain, active since 1999 and currently disbanded.

== Biography ==
After three years of line-up changes, Anvil of Doom started in 2002. Their demo Died Before Dawn led them to sign a deal with Spanish Metal label Xtreem Music. Throughout 2003, they worked on new material for their first album while honing their live performance, playing through Andalusia with local bands and sharing the stage with Barón Rojo, Soziedad Alkoholika, and Avulsed. They took part in the Xtreem Music Festival in Madrid, with Exodus, Nuclear Assault, and Grave.

In January 2004, the band began studio sessions for their first album. Deathillusion was to include three re-recordings from the demo and six new songs that reflected an evolution toward technical death metal, without losing the band’s melodic touch. The album was released in October and received good reviews in specialized media around the world. After that, they kept touring, playing with some of the biggest bands in the genre in summer fests like The Metalway Festival, and headlining domestic underground festivals.

During 2007, the band focused on composing and rehearsing new songs for their second album, distancing themselves from the melodic label.

By early 2008, vocalist and guitarist left the band, breaking the creative process leading to AOD's second album. They were replaced through that year by guitarist Ángel L. Berlanga and Andhord's vocalist Kvoraph, though by February 2009 the band decided to do without Ángel, because he didn't actually fit the band's needs. He was replaced by John M. Peterson, the man behind the band Perseidan, while MG, from Sevillian Death Metal act Neter, was recruited on the vocal role to replace Kvoraph after his decision to quit the band in September 2009.

In summer 2009, Anvil of Doom resumed touring, taking part in several festivals around Andalusia included in the so-called Re(TOUR)synthesis. In 2011, AOD released an EP entitled "Turn Your Back", along with a videoclip of the title track. This release was supported by an extensive Spanish tour, which saw the band playing next to international legends like Malevolent Creation and Pestilence. In summer 2012, Anvil of Doom starts pre-production for their long-expected second full-length, in order to begin recording by fall.

== Style and influences ==
The band's style is mostly concerned with death metal. In their early stages, the band was more focused on melodic death metal, significantly influenced by Swedish bands such as Arch Enemy, Darkane, In Flames and Soilwork. After recording Died Before Dawn, the new compositions for Deathillusion pointed to a more technical approach on the steps of North American acts like Death, and more presence of classical thrash metal riffs, without losing the band's distinctive melodic reference. This tendency is more patent on recent songs, composed for their future second album.

== Members ==
=== Final lineup ===
- Hugo Donaire - guitar
- Matoto - drums
- Tzaraath - bass
- MG - vocals

== Discography ==
- Died Before Dawn (Demo, 2002)
- Deathillusion (CD, Xtreem Music, 2004)
- Turn Your Back (EP, 2011)
