= List of Swedish death metal bands =

This is a list of Swedish death metal artists.

== A ==
- Aeon
- Afflicted
- Anata
- Arch Enemy
- Arise
- At the Gates
- Autopsy Torment
- Amon Amarth

== B ==
- Bloodbath

== C ==
- Carbonized
- Cardinal Sin
- Carnage
- Cemetary
- Centinex
- Ceremonial Oath
- Comecon
- The Crown

== D ==
- Dark Tranquillity
- Darkane
- Death Breath
- Defleshed
- Demonoid
- Desultory
- Dimension Zero
- Disfear
- Dismember
- Dissection
- Draconian
- The Duskfall

== E ==
- Edge of Sanity
- Entombed
- Eternal Oath
- Eucharist
- Evocation
- Expulsion

== F ==
- Face Down
- Feared
- Fission

== G ==
- Gates of Ishtar
- General Surgery
- God Macabre
- Godgory
- Grave
- Grotesque

== H ==
- Hearse
- Humanity's Last Breath
- Hypocrisy

== I ==
- Impious
- In Battle
- In Flames
- In Mourning
- Inevitable End
- Insision

== K ==
- Kaamos
- Katatonia

== L ==
- Liers in Wait

== M ==
- Merciless
- Meshuggah
- Miseration
- Morbid
- Murder Squad

== N ==
- Necrophobic
- Nihilist
- Nine
- Nirvana 2002

== O ==
- Ofermod
- Opeth
- Orbit Culture

== P ==
- Paganizer
- Pan.Thy.Monium
- The Project Hate MCMXCIX
- Parasite Inc.
- Pantokrator

== R ==
- Raise Hell
- Repugnant
- Runemagick

== S ==
- Satanic Slaughter
- Satariel
- Scar Symmetry
- Seance
- Soilwork
- Solution .45
- Spawn of Possession

== T ==
- Therion
- Tiamat
- Tribulation

== U ==
- Unanimated
- Unleashed

== V ==
- Visceral Bleeding
- Vomitory

== Z ==
- Zonaria
