= Inhumate =

French deathgrind band

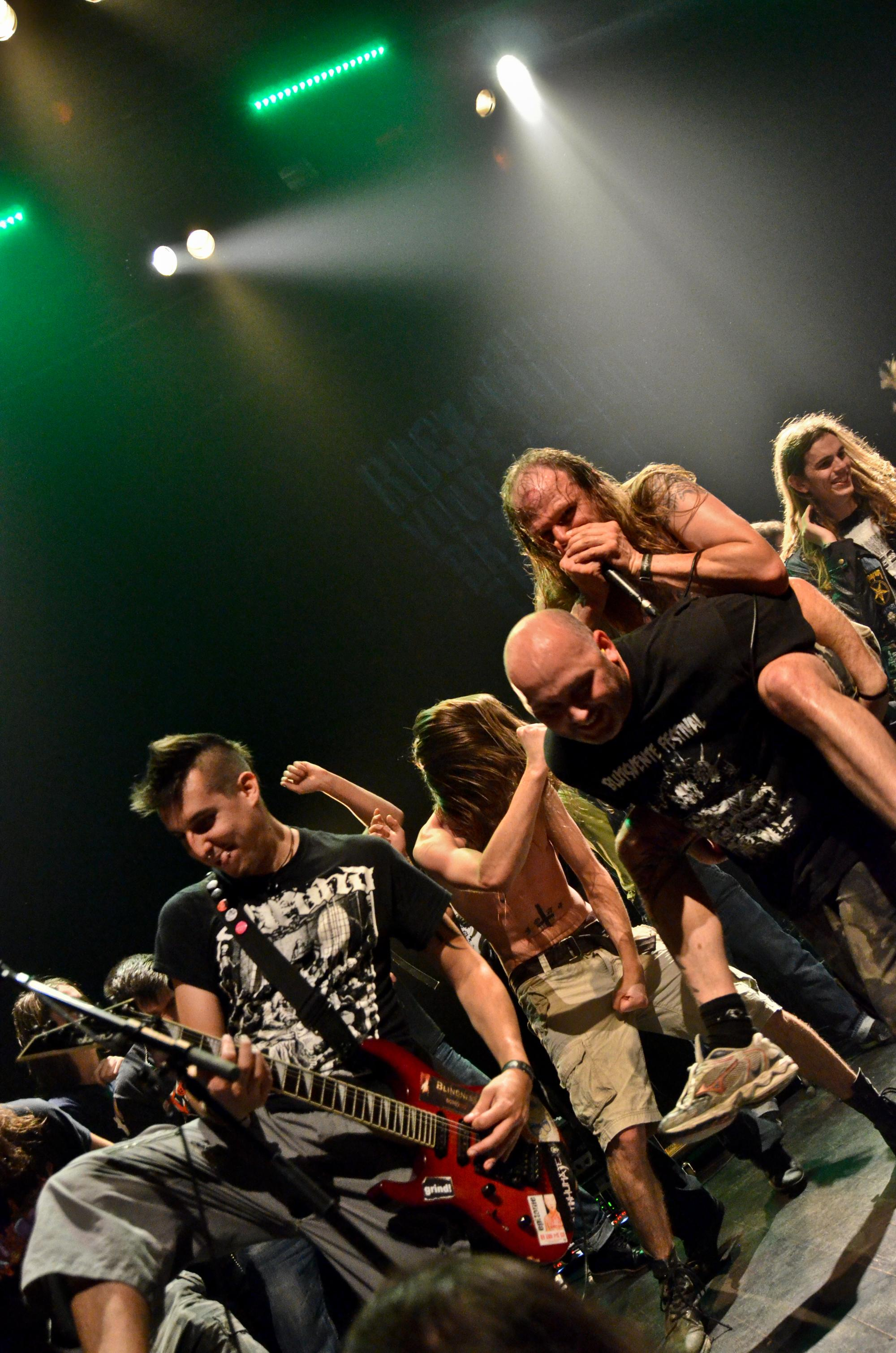
- Inhumate in 2013

Background information
- Origin: Strasbourg, France
- Genres: Deathgrind, grindcore
- Years active: 1990–2025
- Members: Christophe; Damien; Fred; Yannick
- Past members: Olivier; Stéphane; Valentin; Sébastien; David
- Website: inhumate.com

Inhumate were a French deathgrind band. They started off as a death metal band in 1990 but with a line up change in 1993 where Stephane and Olivier left the band and were replaced by Valentin and Sebastien, the band's musical stile shifted towards grindcore.

In their career they have played concerts with such band as Agathocles, Cannibal Corpse, Cryptopsy, Immolation, Sepultura, Malignant Tumour, Nile, Six Feet Under, Unholy Grave and Vader, in a total of 9 different European countries (France, Belgium, Netherlands, Switzerland, Poland, Germany, Italy, Austria and Czech Republic).

== History ==
The band was formed in September 1990 by bassist Fred, who went to Strasbourg looking for musicians with whom he could form a death metal band. He quickly found Olivier (vocals), Stéphane (drums) and David (guitar), and the band formed under the name Inhumate.

After a year, Stéphanie and Olivier left the band and were replaced by Valentin (drums) and Sébastien (vocals). With this line-up, the band became more grindcore-orientated and recorded its first demo, Abstract Suffering, in 1993. In 1994, Valentin and Sébastien left the group and were replaced by Yannick (drums) and Christophe (vocals).

This line-up remained stable and more focused on grind. In May 1995, they recorded their second demo, Grind Your Soul. In the following years, they released four studio albums: Internal Life (September 1996), Ex-Pulsion (November 1997), Growth (June 2000) and Life (February 2004).

In October 2006, the band's guitarist, David, left the group and was replaced by Damien, 2 years and half later Inhumate released its fifth full-length album The Fifth Season (April 2009)

On November 8, 2025, Inhumate gave its final concert at Molodoï in Strasbourg and ended its journey after a 35-year career.

== Members ==
- Fred – bass (1990–2025)
- Yannick – drums (1994–2025)
- Christophe – vocals (1994–2025)
- Damien – guitar, vocals (2006–2025)

=== Former members ===
- Stephane – drums (1990–1991)
- David – guitar, vocals (1990–2006)
- Oliver – vocals (1990–1991)
- Valentin – drums (1991–1994)
- Sebastien – vocals (1991–1994)

== Discography ==
- 1993 – Abstract Suffering (demo tape)
- 1995 – Grind Your Soul (demo tape)
- 1996 – Internal Life
- 1997 – Ex-Pulsion
- 2000 – Growth
- 2004 – Life
- 2007 – At War with... Inhumate (DVD)
- 2009 – The Fifth Season
- 2013 – Expulsed
- 2021 – Eternal Life

=== Splits ===
- Split tape with Funeral March (1996)
- Split tape with Exhumator (1998)
- Split tape with Disembowel (1998)
- Split tape with Trauma Team (1998)
- Split tape with Maggot Shoes (1999)
- Split tape with Sanguinary (1999)
- Split 7" with Alienation Mental (2000)
- Split 7" with Vaginal Incest : Fetus Included (2003)
- Split 7" with Depression (2008)
