= List of deathgrind bands =

This is a list of bands that perform deathgrind, a fusion of grindcore music with death metal.

== List of notable deathgrind bands ==
Band	Country	Formed	Notes
Aborted	Belgium	1995	
Antidemon	Brazil	1994	
Asesino	USA	2002	
Assück	USA	1988	
Benighted	France	1998	
The Berzerker	Australia	1995	
Blood Duster	Australia	1991	
Brodequin	USA	1998	
Brujeria	USA	1989	
Brutal Truth	USA	1990	
Carcass	UK	1985	
Cattle Decapitation	USA	1996	
Cephalic Carnage	USA	1992	
Circle of Dead Children	USA	1998	
The County Medical Examiners	USA	2001	
Dead Infection	Poland	1990	
Defecation	UK	1987	
Devourment	USA	1995	
Exhumed	USA	1990	
Extreme Noise Terror	UK	1985	
Inevitable End	Sweden	2003	
Lock Up	UK	1998	
Macabre	USA	1984	
Misery Index	USA	2001	
Mortician	USA	1989	
Mortification	AUS	1990	
Napalm Death	UK	1981	
Nuclear Blaze	USA	2006	
Origin	USA	1997	
Pig Destroyer	USA	1997	
The Red Chord	USA	1999	
Rotten Sound	Finland	1993	
Terrorizer	USA	1985	
Terrorizer LA	USA	2014	

== See also ==
- List of goregrind bands
