= Acid Witch =

American extreme metal band

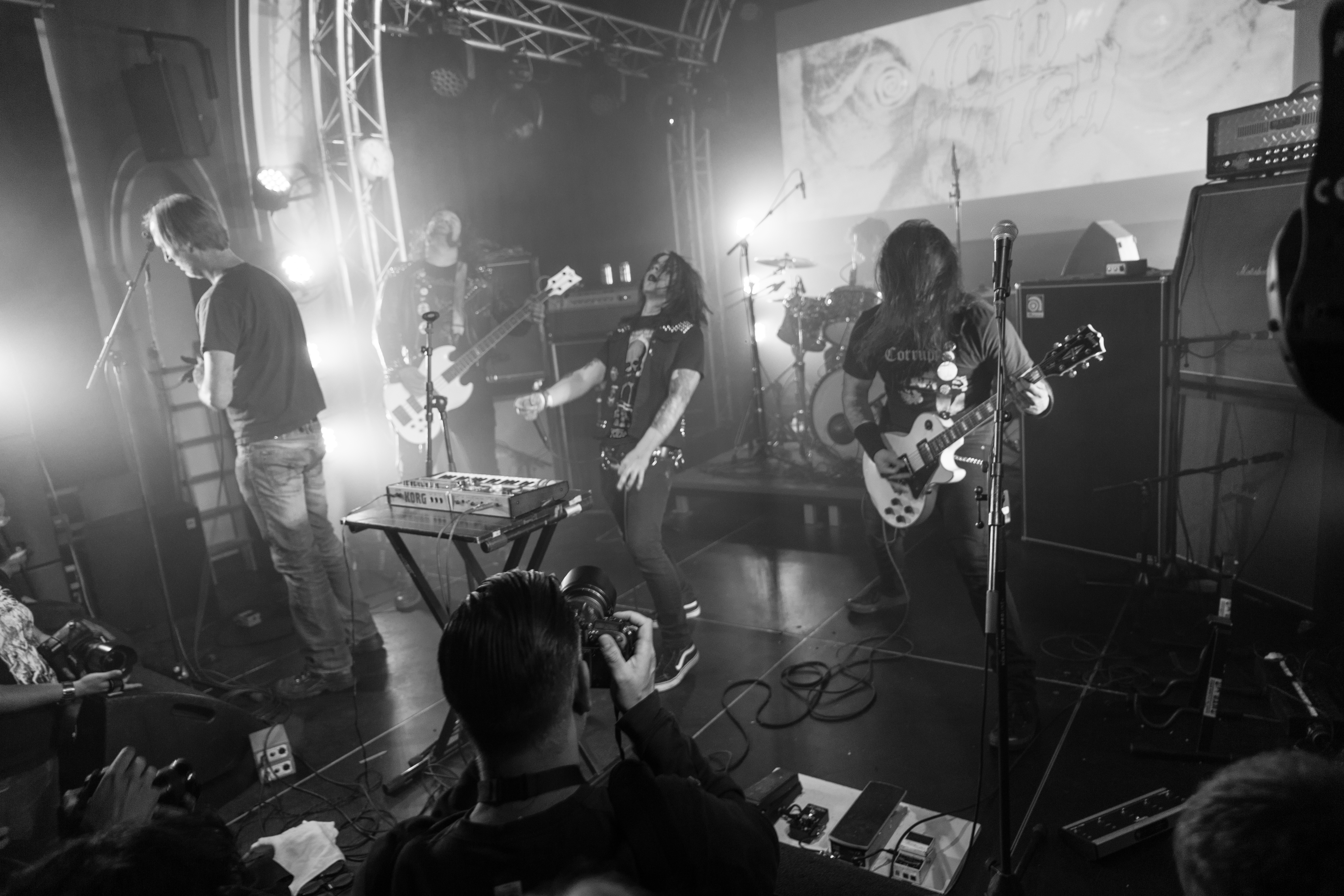
- Acid Witch performing in 2015

Background information
- Origin: Detroit, Michigan, U.S.
- Genres: Death-doom, stoner metal, psychedelic
- Years active: 2007–present
- Labels: Razorback, Hells Headbangers
- Members: Shagrat; Slasher Dave; Phil Warren; Mike Tuff

Acid Witch is an American extreme metal band formed in Detroit, Michigan, in 2007. They released their first album, Witchtanic Hellucinations, in 2008 on Razorback Records. The band released two EPs, Witch House in 2009 and Midnight Mass in 2010. They released their second album, Stoned, in 2010, on Hells Headbangers Records. In 2012, Witchtanic Hellucinations was re-released on the same label.

== Style and influences ==
The band's musical style draws from many genres, including death metal, doom metal, stoner metal, psychedelic music and horror films and their soundtracks such as the music of John Carpenter's Halloween. Some have noted the influence of the new wave of British heavy metal.

Lead vocalist Slasher Dave has cited Pagan Altar and Witchfinder General as some of his influences. Due to the main overtones of the music, the band has dubbed themselves "Halloween metal".

=== Lyrics ===
The band's lyrics deal with witchcraft, Halloween, and Satanism. Many of their songs' lyrics are inspired by horror films and feature gore and references to sex and drugs.

== Discography ==
=== Albums ===
- Witchtanic Hellucinations (2008)
- Stoned (2010)
- Evil Sound Screamers (2017)
- Rot Among Us (2022)

=== EPs ===
- Acid Witch demo, 2007
- Witch House, 2009 (Doomentia Records)
- Midnight Mass, 2010 (Hells Headbangers)
- Spooky, Split EP with Nunslaughter, 2014 (Hells Headbangers)
- Midnight Movies, 2015 (Hells Headbangers)
- Black Christmas Evil, 2018

=== Singles ===
- "It's Halloween Night (The Witches' Jack-O-Lantern)", 2019
- "Witch House", 2020
- "Turntable Terror", 2020
- "Pranks", 2023
