= Neptune (Italian band) =

Italian melodic death metal band

- Origin: Verona, Italy
- Genres: Melodic death metal
- Years active: 1999–present
- Labels: Noisehead
- Members: Mattia "Tia" Nidini; Mattia "Phil" Filippi; Claudio Giacometti; Francesco "Cesco" Adami; Corrado "Corradino" Zoccatelli
- Past members: Aldo Colognato; Andrea "Pina" Pinamonte; Alessio "Perro" de Antoni; Francesco "Kekko" Moro; Andrea "Andrax" Mameli; Mirko "Cape" Capellari; Luca "Tex" Tezza
- Website: neptunedeath.it

Neptune is an Italian melodic death metal band from Verona, formed in 1999. Their influences are based upon melodic death metal acts such as Hatesphere, In Flames, Soilwork, Dark Tranquillity, Disarmonia Mundi, At the Gates and The Haunted. They have released four albums and a demo.

== Band members ==
=== Current members ===
- Mattia "Tia" Nidini − vocals
- Mattia Filippi − guitars
- Claudio Giacometti − guitar
- Francesco "Cesco" Adami − bass
- Corrado "Corradino" Zoccatelli − drums

=== Former members ===
- Luca "Tex" Tezza – guitar
- Mirko "Cape" Capellari – guitar
- Francesco "Kekko" Moro − guitar
- Andrea "Andrax" Mameli − guitar
- Aldo Colognato − guitar
- Alessio de Antoni − keyboards
- Andrea Pinamonte − bass

== Discography ==
- Synthbreed (demo, 2002)
- Perfection and Failure (album, 2004)
- Acts of Supremacy (album, 2008)
- Prelude to Nothing (album, 2013)
- Frames (album, 2021)
