= Cryptic Shift =

English metal band

- Origin: Leeds, West Yorkshire, UK
- Genres: Death metal; thrash metal; technical death metal
- Years active: 2013–present
- Labels: Metal Blade, Blood Harvest
- Members: Xander Bradley: Joss Farrington; John Riley; Ryan Sheperson
- Past members: Rob Castle; Hokumu Blitzkreig; Henry Parker; Joe Bradley

Cryptic Shift (formerly stylized as Crÿptic Shift) is an English extreme metal band formed in Leeds, West Yorkshire in 2013. They have two EPs and two demos. Their debut album, Visitations from Enceladus, was released on 4 May 2020 through Blood Harvest records. An article for The Quietus called the album "damn near essential, and proof that [Britain] has a valid contribution to make to this new wave of progressive death metal". They released their second album, Overspace & Supertime, on February 27, 2026.

== History ==
The future members of Cryptic Shift began writing music together at the beginning of 2010, while they were in high school. Guitarist Xander Bradley, drummer Ryan Sheperson, vocalist Rob Castle and bassist Hokumu Blitzkreig officially formed the band in 2013. The group released their debut demo tape, Old Chapel Demos, in 2014. Castle departed the group soon after, leading Bradley to take on the role of vocalist. They hired Henry Parker as an additional guitarist. Around this time, the band underwent what Bradley considers a "reincarnation", where the band began "a new focused sound and much improved mindset". In 2015, Parker departed the group. John Riley replaced him. This line-up recorded the demo tape Beyond The Celestial Demo the same year, followed a few months later by a split EP with Beastial Invasion. On 27 November 2015, their debut single, "Deathcrusher" was released. The track was included on their debut EP, released on 1 April 2016, titled Beyond the Celestial Realms. On 3 February 2016, they opened for Exodus at Fibbers in York. Parker departed the group in 2017, replaced with guitarist Joe Bradley. On 28 April 2017, they released the single "Cosmic Dreams". Their debut full-length album, Visitations from Enceladus, was released on 4 May 2020 through Blood Harvest Records. Metal Hammer named it the 13th-best metal album of 2020.

== Musical style ==
The band have been categorised as death metal, thrash metal, and technical death metal, often incorporating elements of jazz, progressive metal, doom metal, noise music, psychedelic rock latin music and black metal. Dom Lawson for Metal Hammer described them as "phenomenal technological astro-death". Echoes and Dust writer Joseph Norman said they are "progressive without being proggy, without being Opeth" and "a pitch-perfect balance of death and thrash sensibilities". The Quietus stated that are reviving an "early 90s wave of progressive death metal".

Echoes and Dust writer Joseph Norman referred to them as the "most innovative, tech-death-thrash band that the UK has to offer" and their debut album as "Death metal teams with the tentacled, extra-dimensional monsters of pulp science fiction and space opera, and the weird tales of Lovecraft, Clark Ashton Smith, and Robert Howard". In an article for Metal Hammer writer Jonathan Selzer described their debut album as "a visionary, fully-realised assault on the senses whose preview tracks released so far have already put the underground's knickers in a physics-defying twist". In a PopMatters article, it was stating that they are "modernizing the best that retro extreme metal has to offer".

Their releases often include overarching lyrical themes and stories about astronomy and outer space with technical musicianship, elaborate song structures and death growls. In an interview for Distorted Sound, vocalist Xander Bradley stated that "There's sci-fi sound FX, a ton of solos and plasma. There's also an extremely in-depth accompanying space adventure tale told within the lyrics, artworks and beyond". The story told on 2020's Visitations From Enceladus even having begun on 2017's Cosmic Dreams. An article for Toilet ov Hell stated that "Thematically, while science fiction has always had an undeniable presence in death metal it's now more vital than ever in a time when the genre is starving for a path forward beyond tongue-in-cheek shock-n-shlock tedium without having to abandon the grim, foreboding atmosphere that carried it for years" Elements such as guitar hooks, abrupt tempo changes, atmospherics, melodic passages. dissonance and harmonies are commonplace.

They have cited musical influences including the Faceless, Vektor, Atheist, Martyr, Gorguts, Death, Obscura, Revocation, Pestilence, John Williams, Atrocity Morbid Angel, Dead Brain Cells, the Chasm, Timeghoul, Sadus and Nocturnus, and stated their lyrics are influenced by the video games Dark Souls and Bloodborne. Distorted Sound writer Danny Sanderson described them as "the UK's answer to Death" and as well as "Mixing together the best of classic thrash and death metal, and coupling the progressive leanings of Atheist and Gorguts with the stunning musicality of the likes of Control Denied and the aforementioned Death".

== Discography ==
Studio albums

- Visitations from Enceladus (2020)
- Overspace & Supertime (2026)

EPs

- Split EP with Beastial Invasion (2015)
- Beyond the Celestial Realms (2016)

Singles

- Deathcrusher (2015)
- Cosmic Dreams (2017)
- The Arctic Chasm (2020)
- Hexagonal Eyes (Diverity Trepaphymphasyzm) (2026)
- Cryogenically Frozen (2026)

Demos

- Old Chapel Demos (2014)
- Beyond the Celestial Demo (2015)

== Members ==
Current

- Xander Bradley – guitar (2012–present), lead vocals (2014–present)
- Joss Farrington – guitar (2020–present)
- John Riley – bass (2015–present)
- Ryan Sheperson – drums (2012–present)

Past

- Rob Castle – lead vocals (2012–2014)
- Hokumu Blitzkreig – bass (2012–2015)
- Henry Parker – guitar (2014–2017)
- Joe Bradley – guitar (2017–2020)
