= Thirdmoon =

Austrian melodic black metal band

- Origin: Linz, Austria
- Genres: Melodic black metal, melodic death metal
- Years active: 1994–present
- Labels: Maintain Records; FM-Records; Napalm Records; CCP-Records
- Members: Wolfgang Rothbauer (vocals, guitar); Matias Larrede (guitar); Dominik Sebastian (guitar); Martin Zeller (drums); Simon Öller (bass)
- Website: http://thirdmoon.at

Thirdmoon are a melodic black metal and death metal band from Austria.

== Biography ==
Founded by Wolfgang Rothbauer in 1994, they released their debut, Grotesque Autumnal Weepings, in 1997. In 1998, they hired French guitarist Matias Larrede, and in 1999, they signed with Napalm Records. They released Aquis Submersus (1999) and Bloodforsaken (2000). They toured with Eisregen.

In 2001, Thirdmoon left Napalm Records. Three years later, they released Sworn Enemy: Heaven. In 2005, they toured with Grave and Disparaged. In April 2007, they signed with German-based label Maintain Records for their fifth album, released in autumn 2007.

Their sixth studio album, Terrarum Exuviae, was released on December 1, 2018.

== Discography ==
- Grotesque Autumnal Weepings - 1997
- Aquis Submersus - 1999
- Bloodforsaken - 2000
- Sworn Enemy: Heaven - 2004
- Dimorphic Cynosure - 2007
- Terrarum Exuviae - 2018
