= Kanonenfieber =

German black/death metal band

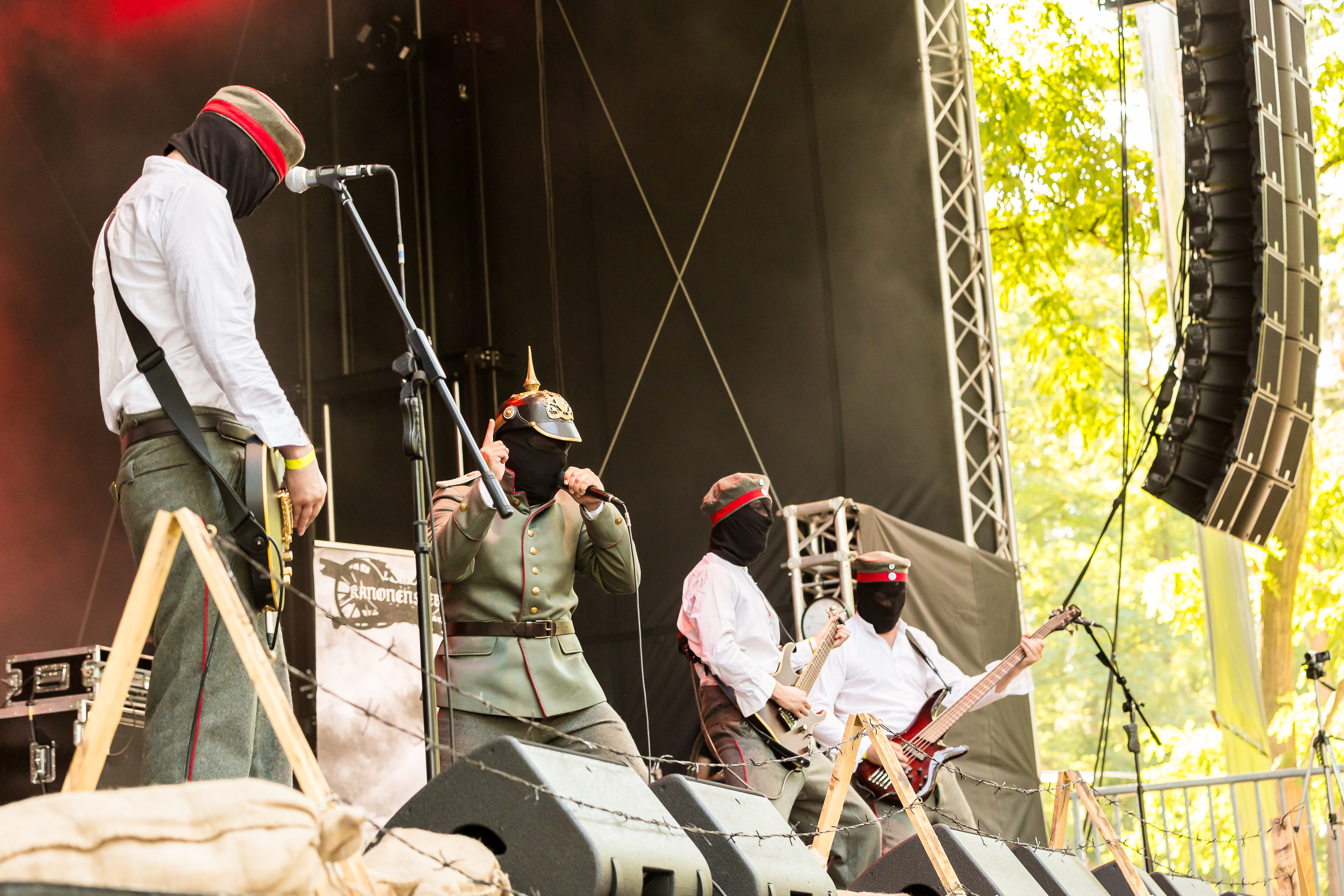
- Kanonenfieber performing at Rock unter den Eichen in 2022

Background information
- Origin: Bamberg, Bavaria, Germany
- Genres: Blackened death metal, melodic death metal, melodic black metal
- Years active: 2020–present
- Labels: Noisebringer, Century Media
- Spinoffs: Non Est Deus, Leiþa
- Members: Noise
- Website: kanonenfieber.noisebringer.de

Kanonenfieber (English: Cannon Fever) is an anonymous German blackened death metal band from Bamberg. Their lyrics are generally centered on World War I.

== History ==
The head of the band is "Noise", a musician from Bamberg. At live concerts, he was accompanied by guest musicians and only sings, while he played all the instruments in the studio. The starting point for Kanonenfieber was an exchange between "Noise" and a friend, a hobby historian, to write an album about the First World War based on letters and original documents from the period.

The group was founded in 2020, and from September to the end of November 2020, the nine tracks of the debut album Menschenmühle were recorded at Noisebringer Studio. Mixing and mastering took another month and a half. Noise was solely responsible for the recordings.

== Musical style ==
Metal.de describes the style of the debut album as "black/death metal", and Scheppercore calls it blackened death metal. Jan Jaedike of Rock Hard describes the sound as "epic death metal", while other reviewers call it "medium-fast, melodic black metal" or "traditional black metal, with interesting interludes". They have also been labelled melodic death metal.

According to Metal.de, the atmosphere created by the band is similar to that of 1914 or Bolt Thrower. Minenwerfer has also been mentioned as a reference. The band's melodies and "meticulous craftsmanship" remind Rock Hard editor Jaedike of Heaven Shall Burn.

== Band members ==
Noise and his live band deliberately keep their identity secret, which is a reference to the Tomb of the Unknown Soldier. The band wears German World War I uniforms and cover their face with black, full-face masks.

=== Studio ===
- Noise – vocals, all instruments (2020–present)
- Hans – session drummer (2021)

=== Live ===
- Noise – vocals (2021–present)
- Gunnar – bass, backing vocals (2021–present)
- Hans – drums (2021–present)
- Kreuzer – lead guitar (2021–2025)
- Ernst – lead guitar (2025–present)
- Sickfried – rhythm guitar (2021–present)

== Discography ==
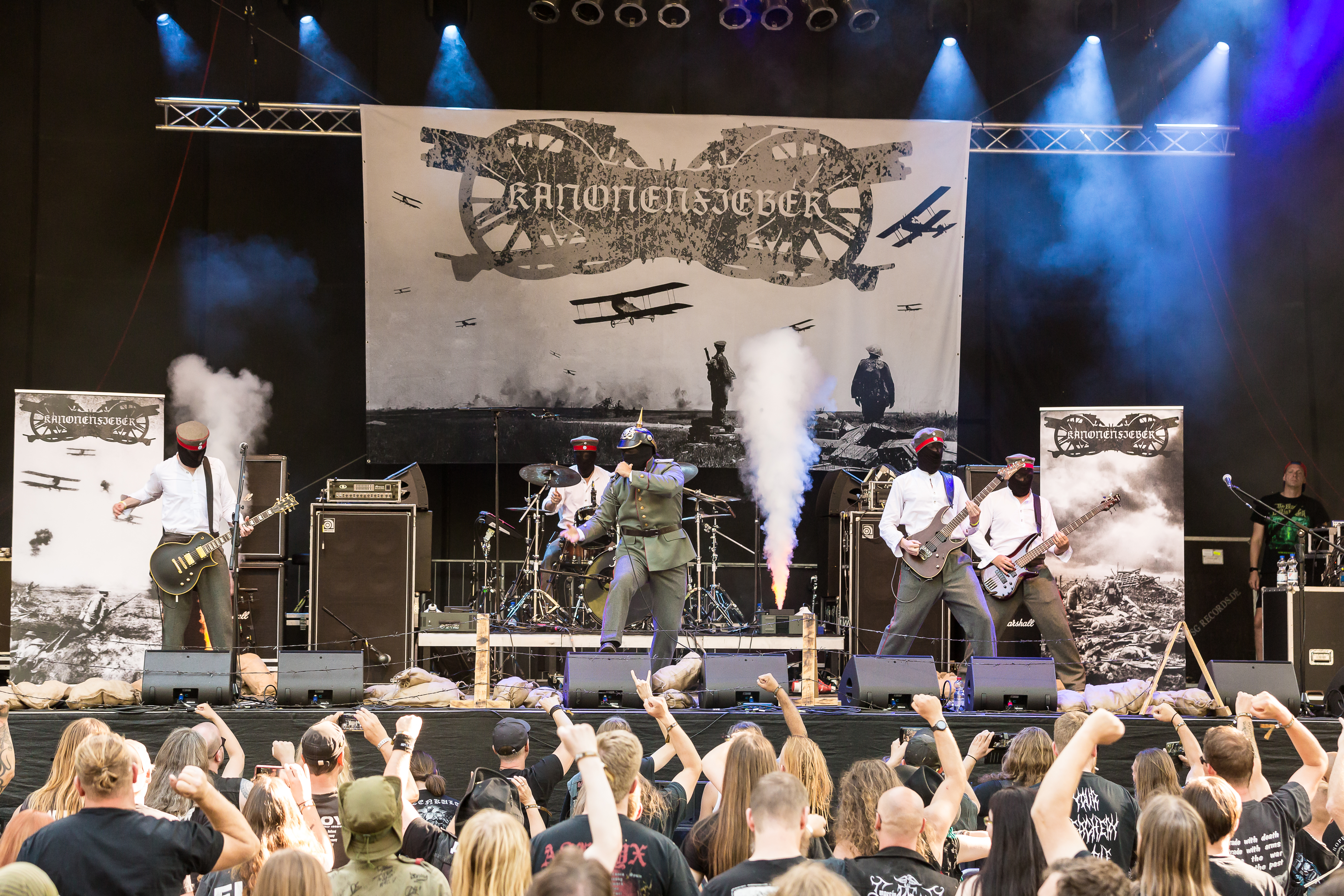
Kanonenfieber performing at Rock unter den Eichen 2022

=== Studio albums ===
- 2021: Menschenmühle (Noisebringer Records, Avantgarde Music)
- 2024: Die Urkatastrophe (Century Media Records)
- 2026: Soldatenschicksale

=== Extended plays ===
- 2022: Yankee Division (Noisebringer Records)
- 2022: Der Füsilier (Noisebringer Records)
- 2023: U-Bootsmann (Noisebringer Records)

=== Singles ===
- 2022: "The Yankee Division" March (Noisebringer Records)
- 2022: "Stop the War" (Noisebringer Records)
- 2022: "Yankee Division" (Noisebringer Records)
- 2022: "Der Füsilier I" (Noisebringer Records)
- 2023: "Kampf und Sturm" (Noisebringer Records)
- 2024: "Menschenmühle" (Century Media Records)
- 2024: "Panzerhenker" (Century Media Records)
- 2024: "Der Maulwurf" (Century Media Records)
- 2024: "Waffenbrüder" (Century Media Records)
- 2025: "Z-Vor!" (Century Media Records)
- 2026: "Heizer Tenner" (Century Media Records)
- 2026: "Meine Lieben" (Century Media Records)

== Spin-offs ==
Apart from Kanonenfieber, Noise has two other projects called Non Est Deus and Leiþa. Each of these projects also has its own lyrical theme. Non Est Deus, which was Noise's first solo-project, discusses the "nonsense of the fanatical practice of religion", while Leiþa discusses themes like despair, self-hatred and depression. Similar to Kanonenfieber, Noise also keeps his and his band's identities a secret by using alter egos and body-covering suits.
