= Decadence (band) =

Swedish heavy metal band

- Origin: Stockholm, Sweden
- Genres: Thrash metal Melodic death metal
- Years active: 2003–2013, 2016–present
- Labels: Heavy Dose (formerly known as HTI Records); Spiritual Beast; Massacre Records
- Members: Kitty Saric; Kenneth Lantz
- Past members: Christian Lindholm; Peter Lindqvist; Joakim Antman; Erik Röjås; Niklas Skogqvist; Simon Galle
- Website: www.decadence.se

Decadence (also known as Decadence Sweden) is an independent heavy metal band from Stockholm, Sweden, formed in November 2003. It is characterized by extreme female vocals.

== Members ==
Current

- 'Metallic' Kitty Saric – vocals
- Kenneth Lantz – guitar

Past

- Christian Lindholm - guitar
- Joakim Antman – bass
- Erik Röjås – drums
- Niklas Skogqvist - guitar
- Simon Galle - guitar

== Discography ==
- Land of Despair (Demo, 2004)
- Decadence (2005)
- The Creature (2005)
- 3rd Stage of Decay, 1st edition (limited-2006), 2nd edition (Japanese-2007) and 3rd edition (worldwide-2008)
- Chargepoint (2009)
- Undergrounder (2017)
- Six Tape (2019)

=== Contributed tracks to ===
- Thrashing Like a Maniac (Compilation, 2007)
- Melody and Malice (Compilation, 2011)
- Global Compilation Album vol 15 (Compilation, 2018)
