= Xenomorph (band) =

Dutch death metal band

- Origin: Leiden, Netherlands
- Genres: Death metal
- Labels: System Shock Records; Under Her Black Wings

Xenomorph is a Dutch death metal band formed in 1994 in Leiden, the Netherlands. The band is named after the Xenomorphs, fictional extraterrestrial creatures created by the Swiss artist H.R. Giger and used in the Alien franchise.

Xenomorph made a successful debut album, Baneful Stealth Desire, which was released by System Shock Records from Germany in 2001. In 2002 they toured Europe with Master and Krabathor.

In 2005, Dutch label Under Her Black Wings released Xenomorph's second album, Necrophilia Mon Amour. The album seems to have suffered from a media boycott in Germany, since it contains a song called "Treblinka," in reference to the Treblinka extermination camp. In 2006 the band went on tour through Europe again, this time with Macabre, Jungle Rot, and Impaled Nazarene.

== Members ==
=== Current members ===
- De Tombe - vocals
- Kreft - guitar
- JRA - bass
- Bomber - drums

=== Former members ===
- Coert Zwart - guitar
- Carmen van der Ploeg - vocals
- Vincent Scheerman - guitar

== Discography ==
- Baneful Stealth Desire (CD, System Shock Records, 2001)
- Necrophilia Mon Amour (CD, Under Her Black Wings, 2005)
