= Necare =

American death-doom metal band

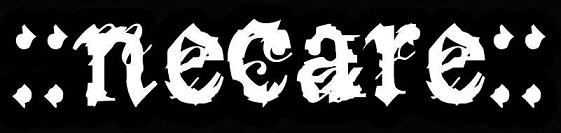

Background information
- Origin: Newport News, VA
- Genres: Death metal, doom metal
- Years active: 1999–2004
- Label: Firebox Records
- Members: Ryan Henry aka R.H. Greer Cawthon aka G.C.

Necare was an American death-doom metal band from Newport News, Virginia, United States. It consisted of Ryan Henry, or R.H., (guitar, bass, keyboards and vocals) and Jonathan Greer Cawthon, or G.C., (drums, guitar and keyboards). The group uses death grunts and clean vocals and sporadically violin and other elements in its mournful and bleak songs.

== History ==
Necare was created in 1999 by two members who identified themselves by their initials (R.H. and G.C.). Many guest musicians also contributed. The studio band has never played live. The name of the band is Latin for "to kill", "to murder", or "to destroy". The project discusses death and the crisis of mankind and religions, which can't explain life's tragedies. It was influenced by English doom metal bands, such as Anathema and My Dying Bride, and others such as Iron Maiden and Chuck Schuldiner. Their lyrics where influenced by singer Aaron Stainthorpe and some English and American poets, such as Algernon Charles Swinburne, Alfred Tennyson, Wilfred Owen and Sylvia Plath.

Before forming Necare, Ryan Henry and Greer Cawthon played in another band. Dissatisfied with said band, they created Necare. In the same year the band was created, Necare recorded the demo album Ophelia. April Leightty (violin) and Erin Vernon (vocals) guested on this album, but it was never released.

One year later, Necare recorded its second independent album, Rite of Shrouds. In 2001, the band recorded another independent album, its third, Appassionata. Andy Henson (guitar), Erin Vernon (vocals), Amy Caroline Parker (vocals), April Leightty (violin) and Ben Snider (violin) were guests on this album.

In 2004, Necare recorded its fourth album on Firebox Records, named Ruin. Produced by Jhon Ackerman, the recording took about one year. The album has two guest musicians, Jhon Ackerman (guitar) and Laura (violin). The band's members played all other instruments. Its songs criticise religion and its failure to explaining mortality. They balanced distortion and melancholy with long, slow songs.

Necare's members were involved in other projects. The band officially disbanded in 2004, when Ryan Henry moved on to funeral-doom metal band Reclusiam. That same year, he was invited to compose, as a guest musician, for Swedish Gothic-doom metal band Draconian.

== Discography ==
- 1999: Ophelia
- 2000: Rite of Shrouds
- 2001: Appassionata
- 2004: Ruin (Firebox Records)
