= Necros Christos =

German extreme metal band

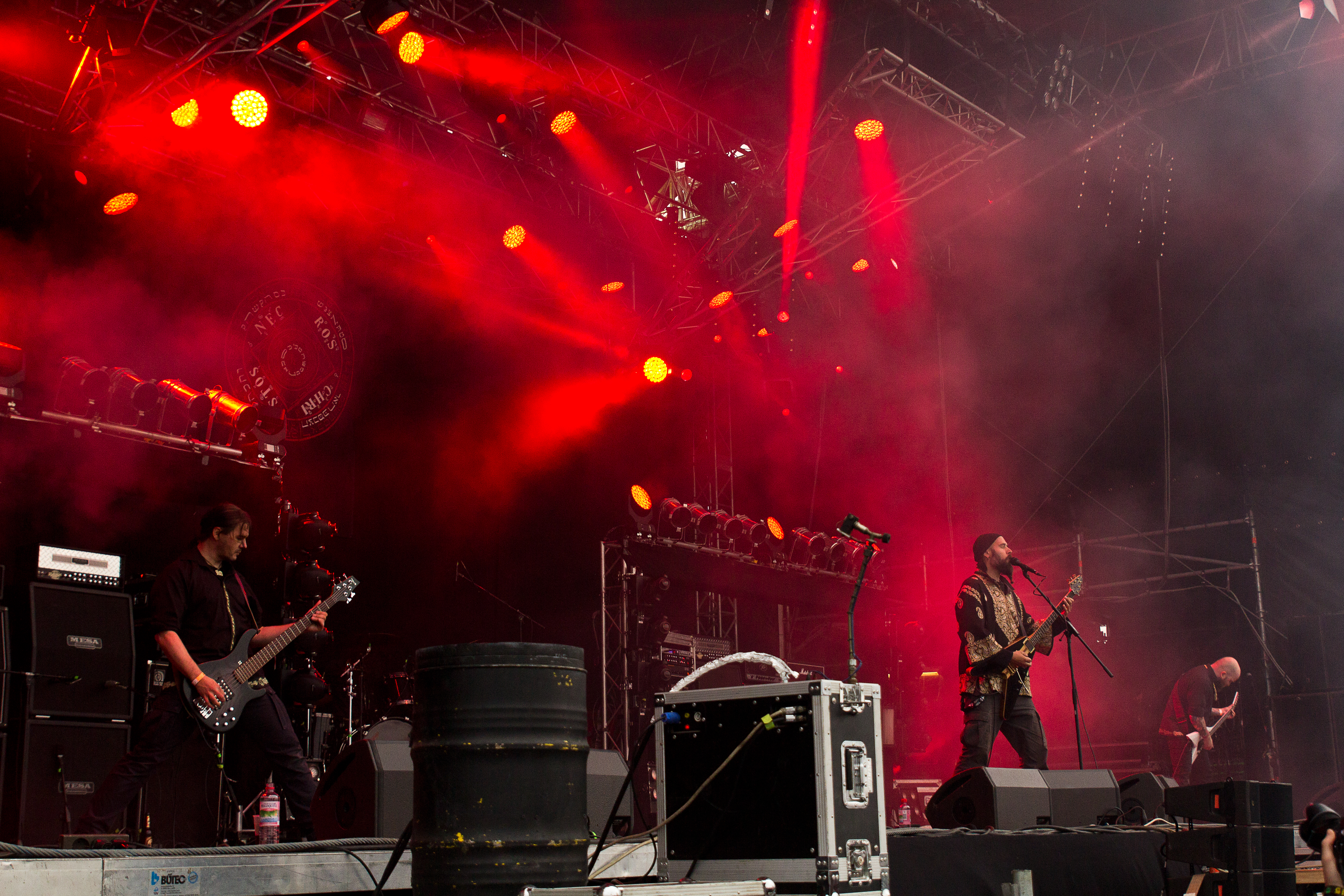
- Necros Christos performing in 2016

Background information
- Origin: Berlin, Germany
- Genres: Death metal, death-doom
- Years active: 2001–2021
- Labels: Sepulchral Voice, Ván
- Website: Necros Christos on Facebook

Necros Christos (Greek νεκρός Χριστός for 'Dead Christ') was a German death metal band from Berlin, active from 2001 to 2021. They released three studio albums.

== History ==
The band released three demos and two rehearsal recordings, as well as several EPs and singles, in their first years. In 2006, the band signed to Sepulchral Voice Records, and a year later, the debut album Triune Impurity Rites was released.

Drummer Luciferus Christhammer left the band and Raelin Iakhu replaced him. Over four years, the musicians worked on their second album, Doom of the Occult, released in the spring of 2011 and well received by the press.

In 2018, the band published Domedon Doxomedon, their third studio album. The band announced that the album was intended to be their last. The album peaked at #90 in the German charts.

They announced in 2021 that they are splitting up. Mors Dalos Ra and drummer Iván Hernández shifted to their death/thrash project, Sijjin.

== Musical style ==
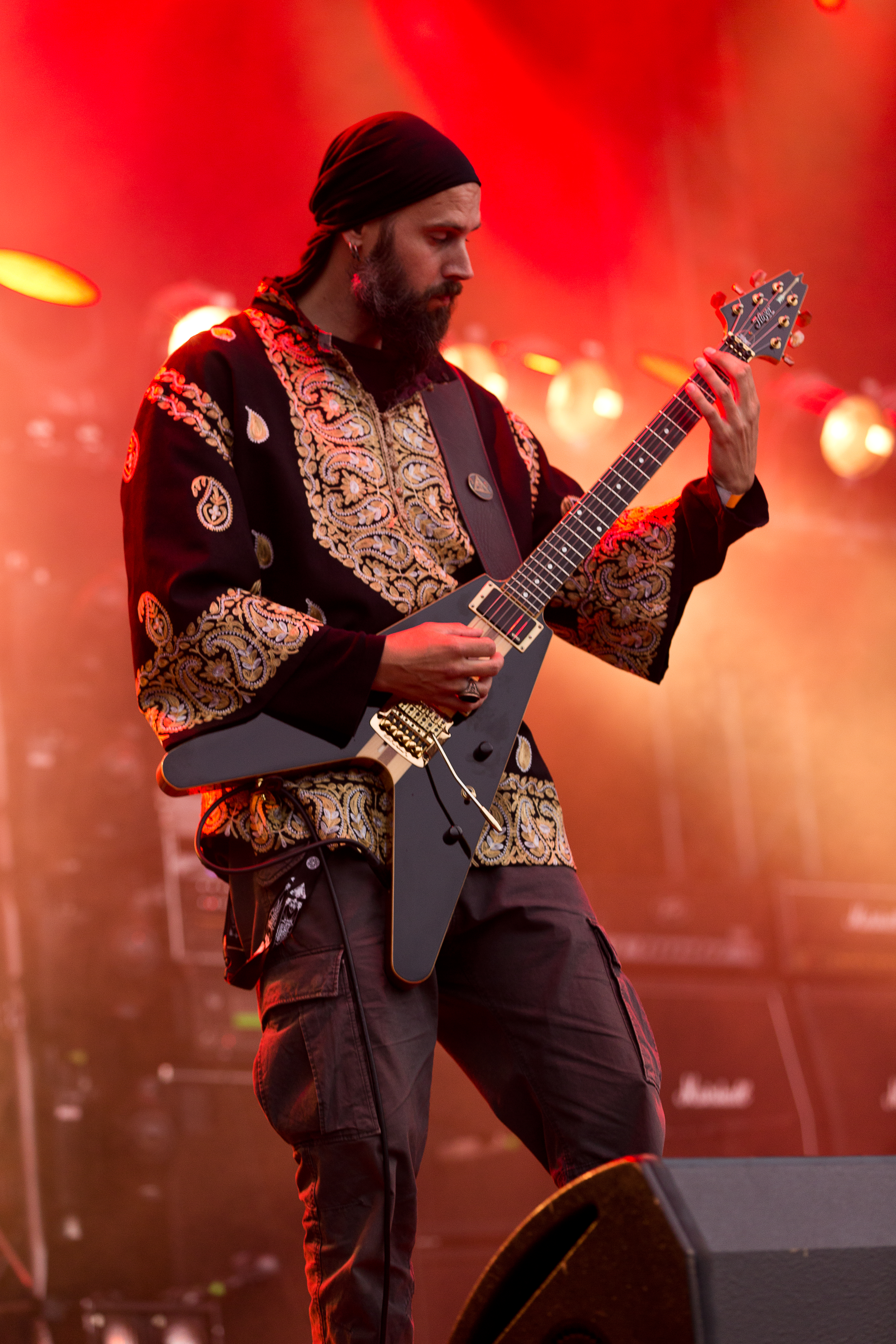
Mors Dalos Ra performing at the Party.San Festival in Germany in 2016

The music of Necros Christos renounces high speeds, blast beats and demonstrations of the technical skills of the musicians, and instead focuses on "slow, simple, panzer-like heaviness in conjunction with sinister growls and a strange, indefinable occult quality". In the context of the metal subculture, singer and songwriter Mors Dalos Ra sees the band more in the tradition of bands like Black Sabbath and Mercyful Fate in their occult orientation than in the modern-sounding, blastbeat-heavy death metal bands. His musical inspiration, however, comes more from the Eastern folklore, especially Persia, India and the Arab countries. As a further important source, he gives Italian and German Baroque music and old occult 1960s/1970s rock like Coven or Salem Mass, as well as The Jimi Hendrix Experience.

Mors Dalos Ra also writes the lyrics for Necros Christos. While his occult interests and studies are primarily Kabbalah-related, most texts deal with inverted Old Testament stories, the Apocalypse in the Apocrypha, ancient middle Eastern cultures, the mysteries of death, necromancy, black masses and copulation, mixed with his own experiences. Mors Dalos Ra explains the name of the band as another name of the amorphous entity of extreme damnation and darkness, the black brother of Christ, who is already known by names such as Ishtar, Ahriman, Shaitan, Satan and Lucifer.

== Discography ==
=== Demos ===
- 2002: Necromantic Doom
- 2003: Black Mass Desecration
- 2004: Ritual Doom Rehearsal
- 2004: Grave Damnation
- 2004: Ritual Crucifixion

=== Studio albums ===
- 2007: Triune Impurity Rites
- 2011: Doom of the Occult
- 2018: Domedon Doxomedon

=== Live albums ===
- 2014: Darkness Comes To... Live!

=== EPs and singles ===
- 2004: Curse of the Necromantical Sabbath
- 2004: Baptized by the Black Urine of the Deceased
- 2005: Split EP with Loss
- 2006: Split EP with Teitanblood
- 2014: Nine Graves
