= Abysmal Torment =

Maltese death metal band

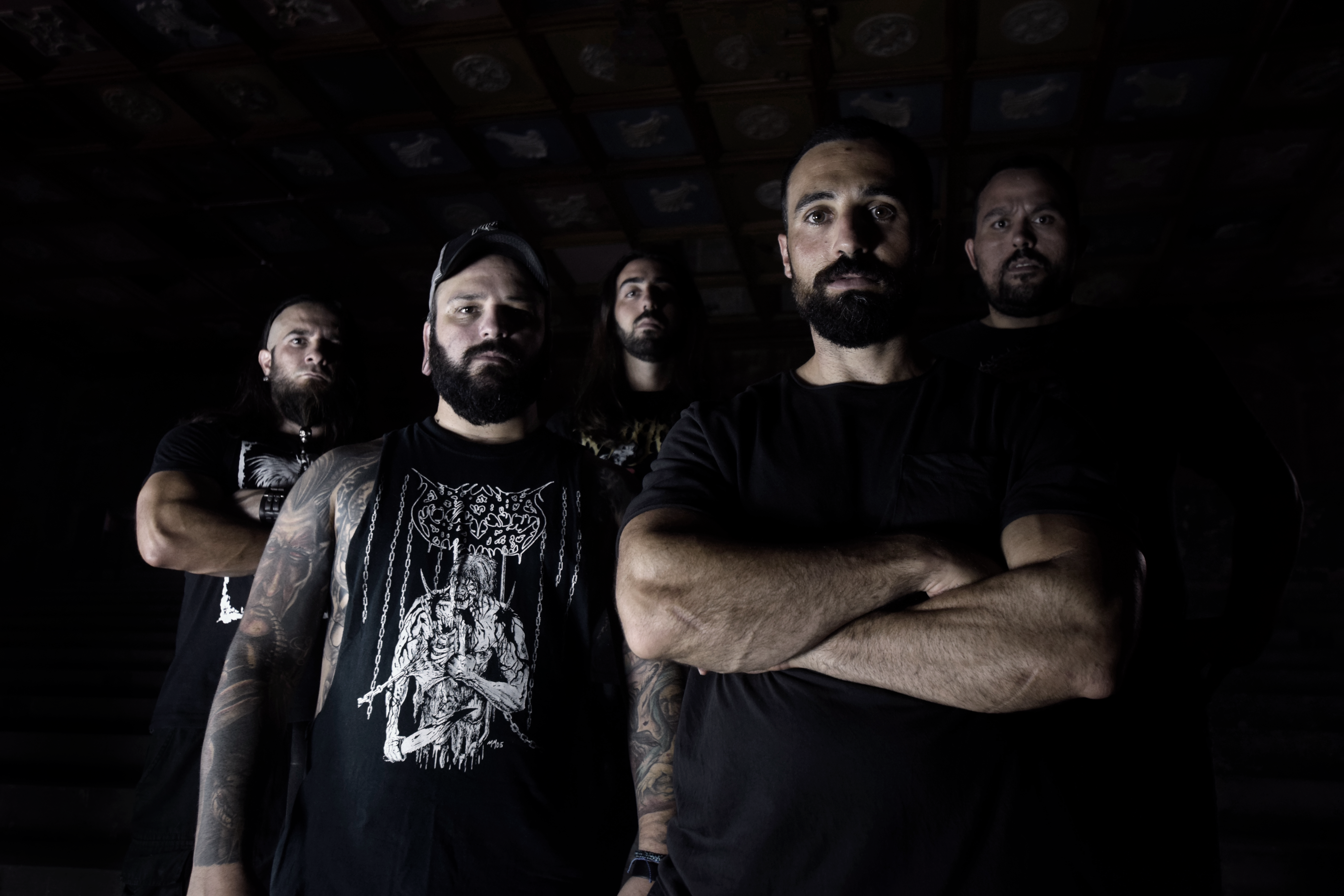
- Abysmal Torment, lineup from 2019

Background information
- Also known as: Molested
- Origin: Malta
- Genres: Death metal, technical death metal
- Years active: 2000−present
- Labels: Willowtip Records, Brutal Bands
- Spinoffs: ClubMurder
- Members: Nick Farrugia; Melchior Borg; Max Vassallo; David Depasquale; Claudio Toscano

Abysmal Torment is a death metal band from Malta formed in 2000 by Nick Farrugia. The current line-up includes Farrugia (vocals), Melchior Borg (vocals), David Depasquale (guitars), Max Vassallo (drums), and Claudio Toscano (bass).

== History ==
=== Early years (2000–2002) ===
Abysmal Torment emerged in 2000 in Malta as a violent death metal band under the name Molested. Although undergoing various line-up changes, Abysmal Torment performed their first notable show in 2002. The band uses speed-stimulated tempos, breakdowns, technical riffing, and a dual assault of varying gurgling vocals. Their music features dark lyrical content, including themes of death and gore.

=== Incised Wound Suicide (2002–2005) ===
Abysmal Torment entered Temple Studios in 2004 to record their debut album, Insiced Wound Suicide, which was described as consisting of five "drum kit mashing, guitar shredding, vocal chord wrecking ultra fucking brutal death metal" tracks. The album received encouraging reviews. The band signed a three-year album deal with underground label Brutal Bands in the United States. Their first release under Brutal Bands was the re-release of Incised Wound Suicide.

=== Epoch Of Methodic Carnage (2005–2007) ===
The band released their second studio album, Epoch of Methodic Carnage, in February 2006 on Brutal Records. The album included 10 new tracks recorded at Temple Studios with producer David Vella, and featured artwork from Tony Koehl. Major labels in Europe, the United States, and the rest of the world distributed the album. Summer 2006 was a disappointment for Abysmal Torment as they had to cancel an American tour with Beneath the Massacre, Neuraxis, and Victimas as well as festivals such as The Gathering of the Sick and Central Illinois Metal Fest.

In August 2007, Abysmal Torment traveled to Italy for the South Extreme Noise Festival and later traveled Europe with a 23-date tour throughout 12 countries together with Sanatorium. They headlined fests such as the Ludwigshafen Deathfest, Slovak Deathfest and Luzern Deathfest. Shortly after this tour, the band flew to the Netherlands to headline another deathfest, the Drachten Deathfest.

=== Omnicide (2008–2010) ===
The band recorded their anticipated third album, Omnicide, at SpineSplitter Studios. In addition, they appeared in a number of European shows and headlined the Hellvetia Festival in Switzerland. Omnicide was released and distributed worldwide under Brutal Bands in April 2009. The band went on a second European Tour in 2009 supporting the release of Omnicide with Insidious Discrepancy and Cerebral Bore. During this period, Abysmal Torment played what some consider to be their best shows to date at the NRW Deathfest in Germany with Sinister and Ghoul, Meh Suff metal-fest in Switzerland with Belphegor and Debauchery, and the Way of Darkness festival in Germany with Cannibal Corpse, Vader, Marduk, Dying Fetus, and Malevolent Creation. In 2010, the band performed at various European Festivals, namely the Open Air Deathfest in Hunxe, Germany and Neurotic Deathfest in the Netherlands in 2010.

On 17 August 2010, Abysmal Torment found out that former drummer Wayne Vella died in an accident at his workplace. He played on all three Abysmal Torment releases. The band issued a statement on their official pages confirming the tragedy;

Today is a sad day for us all. Unfortunately we have lost our brother Wayne Vella (Drummer in Abysmal Torment from 2001 to 2008) who had just turned 25. He will be remembered by us as a great friend & excellent drummer. We will never forget the great times we shared together & all the awesome experiences. May he rest in peace... & hope he is in a better place. Condolences to all his loved ones! Much respect, Abysmal Torment!

=== 2011–2014 ===
Abysmal Torment headlined two tours in 2011, Butchers on the Road Tour in Russia and the Supreme Tyrant in Europe Tour. Later that year, Gordon Formosa quit the band after more than 10 years. The band recruited two new members, Melchior Borg on vocals, and a second guitarist, Kurt Pace. Abysmal Torment played at numerous festivals in Europe, including Mountains of Death in Switzerland and the first annual Malta Deathfest, and returned to The Way of Darkness.

=== Cultivate The Apostate (2014–2018) ===
Abysmal Torment's third full-length studio album was released under Willowtip Records. Cultivate the Apostate was recorded at SpineSplitter Studio and mixed and mastered by 16th Cellar Studio. Michal Loranc handled the album concept and art. During this period, Abysmal Torment toured around Europe on numerous occasions, playing festivals such as Berlin Deathfest, Carnage Feast, Monthly Assault, and the NRW Deathfest. Soon after the touring cycle, Kurt Pace left the band amicably. The rest of the band carried on writing and producing new material in preparation for the follow-up to Cultivate the Apostate.

=== The Misanthrope (2018-present) ===
On 1 February 2018, Abysmal Torment announced on their Facebook page the completion of the then-new album, The Misanthrope, to be released on 21 September of the same year. The Misanthrope was recorded, mixed and mastered at SpineSplitter Studio. Photography for the cover art was taken by Lee Jeffries and additional editing carried out by Michal Loranc. On 21 July 2018, the band released the track "Squalid Thoughts" as a teaser prior to the full release and was well received upon release. For The Misanthrope, Abysmal Torment switched to eight-string guitars, resulting in the band further downtuning their sound. Amidst news on the upcoming release and preparations for live duties, the band parted ways with bassist Karl Romano. On 3 August, Claudio Toscano was announced as having joined the band to fill in bass duties for the upcoming endeavours. On 11 September, the band released their first official music video for the album's title track, The Misanthrope, soon followed by the full album's official release.

== Discography ==
- Incised Wound Suicide (mini-CD, Self Released, 2004)
- Incised Wound Suicide (mini-CD, Brutal Bands (re-issue), 2004)
- Epoch of Methodic Carnage (CD, Brutal Bands, 2006)
- Omnicide (CD, Brutal Bands, 2009)
- Cultivate the Apostate (CD, Willowtip Records, 2014)
- The Misanthrope (CD, Willowtip Records, 2018)

== Band members ==
=== Current members ===
- Nick Farrugia – vocals (2000–present)
- David Depasquale – guitar (2003–present)
- Max Vassallo – drums (2008–present)
- Melchior Borg – vocals (2011–present)
- Claudio Toscano – bass (2018–present)

=== Former members ===
- Mario Buhagiar – vocals (2000–2001)
- Gan Pawl Bartolo – guitar (2000–2005)
- Tim Vella Briffa – bass (2000–2005)
- Wayne Vella – drums (2000–2009; died 2010)
- Gordon Formosa – vocals (2001–2011)
- Ben Aquilina – bass (2006–2009)
- Karl Romano – bass (2009–2018)
- Kurt Pace – guitar (2011–2018)
