= List of Florida death metal bands =

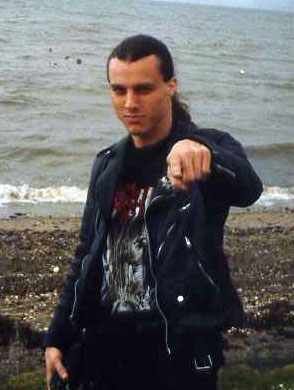
Chuck Schuldiner of the band Death, depicted here on tour in Scotland in 1992, is widely regarded as the "father" or "godfather" of death metal.

This is a list of Florida death metal bands. Death metal is a genre of extreme heavy metal music that is characterized by musically by fast, distorted, down-tuned, and sometimes palm-muted guitar instrumentation, growled and screamed vocals, and hyper-fast, blast beat drumming. The lyrics typically involve graphic, sometimes pornographic and misogynistic, themes of violence, gore, disease, and death; Satanism, blasphemy, and anti-Christian sentiment; and, less frequently, war, apocalypse, social and philosophical concerns, and esotericism and spiritualism. In the mid-1980s through early-1990s, the state of Florida, especially the Tampa Bay area, became the center of development for the death metal genre, earning the Tampa Bay area the colloquial title of "capital of death metal". Many of the most influential and commercially successful death metal bands, such as Death, Morbid Angel, Obituary, and Deicide, originated from the state. The Tampa-based producers Jim and Tom Morris and Scott Burns from the studio Morrisound Recording were highly instrumental in developing and popularizing the sound of the then-emerging death metal genre. The influence and recording opportunities of the scene led a few bands from outside Florida, such as the Buffalo, New York groups Cannibal Corpse and Malevolent Creation, to relocate to the state early in their career. The technical proficiency and progressive approach by many of the Florida bands, particularly Death, Nocturnus, Atheist, and Cynic, led to the development of the progressive death metal genre. The scene declined in the second half of the 1990s but subsequently experienced a resurgence in popularity. In 2009, Nielsen Soundscan reported that Cannibal Corpse, Deicide, Morbid Angel, Six Feet Under, Obituary, and Death collectively sold over five-million albums.

== Originated in Florida ==
- The Absence
- Acheron
- Assück
- Atheist
- The Autumn Offering
- Brutality
- Control Denied
- Council of the Fallen
- Cynic
- Dark Sermon
- Death
- Death Requisite
- Deicide
- Diabolic
- Disincarnate
- Hate Eternal
- Hibernus Mortis
- King Conquer
- Massacre
- Monotheist
- Monstrosity
- Morbid Angel
- Nasty Savage
- Nocturnus
- Obituary
- Order of Ennead
- Paths of Possession
- Six Feet Under
- Solstice
- Success Will Write Apocalypse Across the Sky
- Voodoo Gods

== Relocated to Florida ==
- Angelcorpse - from Kansas City, Missouri
- Cannibal Corpse - from Buffalo, New York
- Malevolent Creation - from Buffalo, New York
- Slaughter to Prevail - from Yekaterinburg, Russia
