= Noumena (band) =

Finnish melodic death metal band

- Origin: Ähtäri, Finland
- Genre: Melodic death metal
- Years active: 1998–present
- Labels: Spinefarm, Catharsis, Haunted Zoo Productions
- Members: Antti Haapanen; Tuukka Tuomela; Ville Lamminaho; Hannu Savolainen; Ilkka Unnbom; Markus Hirvonen; Suvi Uura
- Website: www.noumena.info

Noumena is a Finnish melodic death metal band. The band's name comes from the philosophical term noumenon, used by Immanuel Kant. The band consists of vocalist Antti Haapanen, guitarists Tuukka Tuomela and Ville Lamminaho, bass guitarist Hannu Savolainen and drummer Ilkka Unnbom, a lineup they have maintained since their formation. Female vocalist Suvi Uura is a session member. Hanna Leinonen and Tuomas Tuominen appear as guest vocalists on Absence and Anatomy of Life.

== History ==
Noumena was founded in Ähtäri, Finland in the spring of 1998. In 1999, after two demo tapes and several concerts, the band signed with a Singaporean record label. Their debut album was recorded later that year at Astia Studio. The record label went bankrupt before the album was released. It was until late 2001 that Australian label Catharsis Records agreed to release the album, Pride/Fall.

In January 2004, Noumena released a four-track promo that was moderately successful and led to a deal with Spinefarm Records. The band spent the next October and November making their second album, Absence, released April 13, 2005. On November 1, 2006, they released Anatomy of Life through Spinefarm Records. The album received praise from Metal Maniacs for being, "...another confident step in turning Noumena into Finland’s biggest new export.” Earlier the same year, they released the EP Triumph and Loss, which was only available online. They have created their own label (Haunted Zoo Production) under which they have launched their last three albums, Death Walks With Me, Myrrys and Anima.

== Music ==
The roots of Noumena's music are found in the Scandinavian death metal tradition and 1980s heavy metal. Their lyrics often deal with loss, sadness, and darkness. The band has stated on their official page that they try to keep their music "Fresh, Experimental, and Versatile" (sic)."

== Discography ==
=== Albums ===
- Pride/Fall (2002)
- Absence (2005)
- Anatomy of Life (2006)
- Death Walks With Me (2013)
- Myrrys (2017)
- Anima (2020)

=== EPs ===
- Triumph and Loss (2006) (digital release only)

=== Demos and promos ===
- Aeons (1998)
- For the Fragile One (1999)
- Promo 2000
- Sala
- The Tempter (2004)
- Sleep (2009)
