= Dark Age (band) =

German metal band

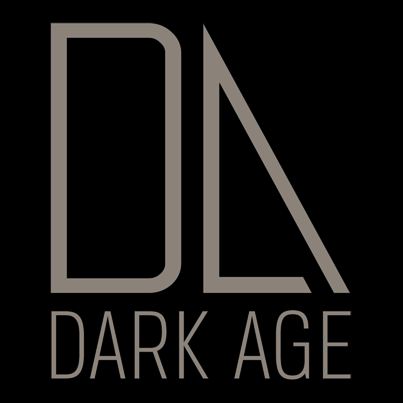

Background information
- Also known as: Dyer's Eve (1994–1995)
- Origin: Hamburg, Germany
- Genre: Melodic death metal
- Years active: 1994–2013 (indefinite hiatus)
- Label: AFM Records
- Members: Eike Freese; André Schumann; Martin Reichert; Jörn Schubert; Alex Henke
- Past members: Torsten Eggert; Oliver Fliegel; Hendrik Brückner; Finn Dierks; Sonja
- Website: dark-age.de

Dark Age is a German melodic death metal band from Hamburg that Eike Freese (guitar, vocals), André Schumann (drums) and Oliver Fliegel (bass) formed in 1994 as Dyer's Eve.

== History ==
In 1994, Eike Freese, André Schumann and Oliver Fliegel formed death metal band Dyer's Eve, inspired by a Metallica song title. One year later, they changed the name to Dark Age, inspired by a Vader song title. In autumn 1995, they recorded their first demo, Doubtful Existence. Keyboardist Martin Reichert joined the band in December 1995. Guitarist Finn Dierks joined in January 1996. Oliver Fliegel left the band in 1996. Finn Dierks moved to the U.S. and Jörn Schubert replaced him.

In Summer 1998, Dark Age recorded their first album, The Fall, which was released after a contract with Remedy Records. In 2000, the album Insurrection followed and they played at Wacken Open Air. In 2002, the album The Silent Republic was recorded in the Stage One-studio. In 2003, they founded their own studio and played again at Wacken Open Air.

In 2003, Dark Age released their demo songs collection EP Remonstrations. They re-recorded their first demo songs. They also included the original demo versions of the songs. Except for the first song, which is a re-recording of a track from The Fall.

In 2004, their self-titled album, Dark Age, was recorded and released. One year later, the DVD Live, So Far... was recorded in the Markthalle in Hamburg. In 2006, Thorsten Eggert left the band and Alex Henke joined. In 2008, the album Minus Exitus was released.

Their sixth full-length album, Acedia, was released in November 2009. Their seventh full-length album, A Matter of Trust, was released on 6 September 2013 through AFM Records.

On 19 November 2015, the band announced that they would go on an indefinite hiatus for personal reasons.

== Discography ==
- 1996: Doubtful Existence (Demo)
- 1996: Promotion Tape Winter '96/'97 (Demo)
- 1998: The Fall (Demo)
- 1999: The Fall (Remedy Records)
- 2000: Insurrection
- 2002: The Silent Republic
- 2003: Remonstrations (EP)
- 2004: Dark Age
- 2006: Live, So Far... (DVD)
- 2008: Minus Exitus
- 2009: Acedia
- 2013: A Matter of Trust
