= Blo.Torch =

Dutch melodic death metal band

- Origin: Netherlands
- Genres: Melodic death metal Thrash metal
- Years active: 1996-2006
- Label: Earache Records

Blo.Torch is a Dutch melodic death metal band from The Hague. Freely mixing genres, their style has been described as black metal. Formed by Marvin Vriesde and Hassan Moechtar in 1996, they experienced a breakthrough when Terrorizer gave their debut demo, The Plot Sickens..., a good review, which caught the attention of Earache Records label manager Dan Tobin. After contacting the band and listening to more material, he offered BloTorch a record deal with Earache sublabel Wicked World Records. Blo.Torch released their self titled debut album on Wicked World in 1999. Blo.Torch and Wicked World parted ways in 2001.

In the following years, Blo.Torch recorded two more demos and replaced vocalist Michel de Wilde with Chris van der Valk. In 2004, Blo.Torch won the regional talent competition De Grote Prijs van Zuid-Holland (The Grand Prize of South Holland). Winning the regional leg earned them a place in the national finals, De Grote Prijs van Nederland (The Grand Prize of The Netherlands), but did not win.

Still unsigned, the band released another full-length album, Volatile, in 2004. In 2005, guitarist Marvin Vriesde left the band to focus on his other band, Severe Torture. Rory Hansen replaced him.

In October 2006, Blo.Torch played their last show in De Baroeg, Rotterdam.

== Overview ==
Founding members Hassan Moechtar and Marvin Vriesde were joined by Sander Koole (formerly with Cypher). After a demo, they recorded an eponymous album, which was picked up by Wicked World, a sublabel of Earache Records, who signed the band in 2000. The band complained about lack of support, and recorded and released the follow-up, Volatile, independently. Since recording that album, the band has played smaller festivals and venues in the Netherlands.

In July 2005, Vriesde left the band (he is also active in Dew-Scented) and was replaced with Rory Hansen, formerly of Bagga Bownz. The band's website announced in 2006 that bassist Sander Koole left to pursue other musical interests. The band's website has not been updated since 7 October 2006.

== Members ==
=== Current members ===
- Hassan Moechtar - guitars
- Rory Hansen - guitars
- Pascal Rappailles - drums
- Chris van der Valk - vocals

=== Past members ===
- Sander Koole - bass
- John den Buitelaar - drums
- Michel de Wilde - vocals
- Marvin Vriesde - guitars

== Discography ==
- The Plot Sickens... (Demo, 1997)
- Blo.Torch (Album, Wicked World/Earache, 1999)
- Demo 2001 (Demo, 2001)
- Plan B (Promo CD, 2002)
- Volatile (Album, 2004)
