= Devian =

Swedish metal band

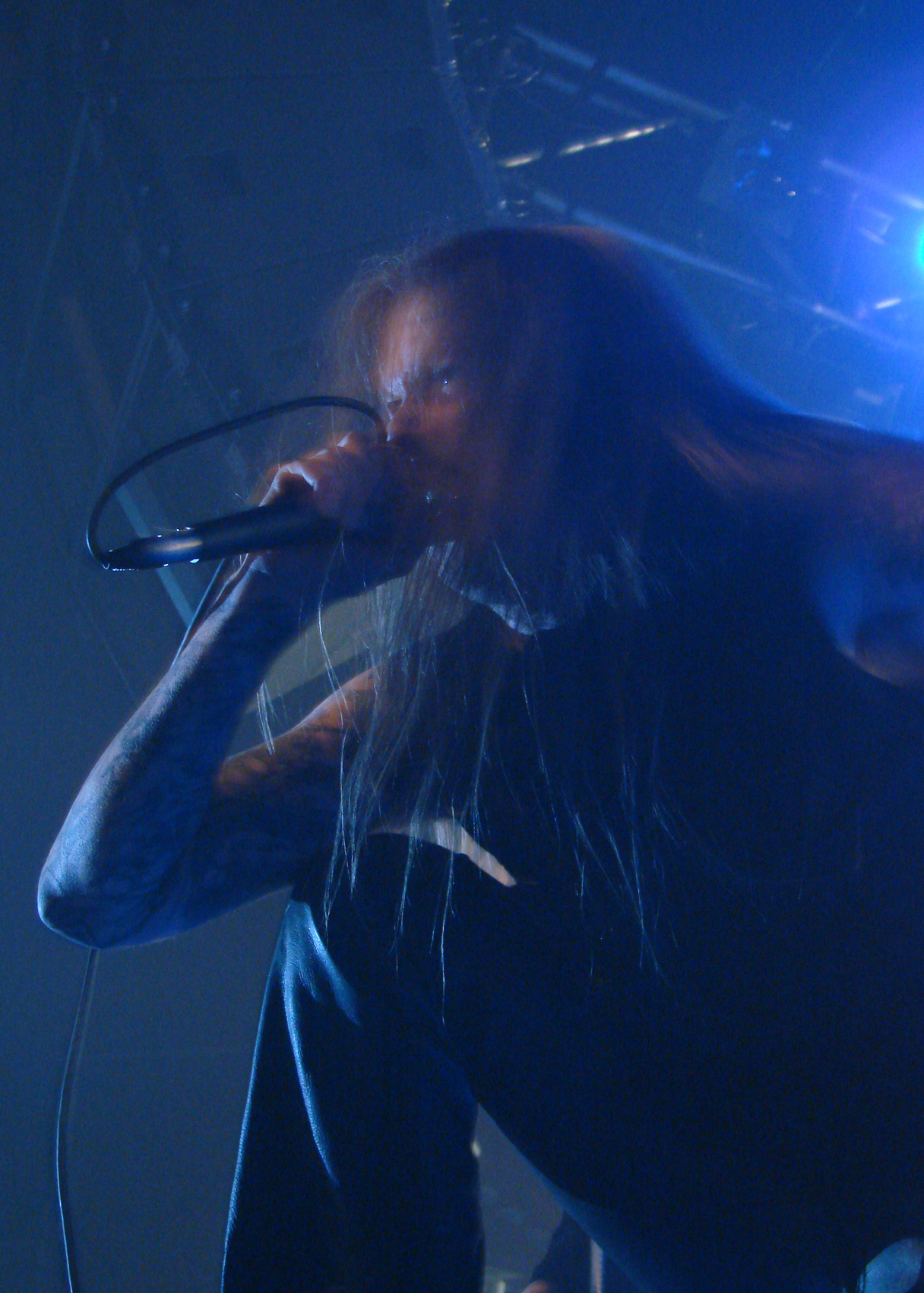

Background information
- Origin: Sweden
- Genres: Death metal, black metal, thrash metal
- Years active: 2006–2011
- Label: Century Media Records
- Members: Joinus; Tomas Nilsson; Carl Stjärnlöv; Emil Dragutinovic
- Past members: Legion; Marcus Lundberg; Roberth Karlsson
- Website: www.devian.se

Devian was a Swedish metal band that Legion (former singer for Marduk) and Emil formed in 2006. Originally called Rebel Angels and then Elizium, they settled on Devian after they found Elizium had been used too often. The new name sounded more mysterious and sinister.

They released two albums, Ninewinged Serpent in 2007 and God To The Illfated in 2008. In the summer of 2008, they toured Europe with Vader.

Metal.de rated Devian's albums as 5 out of 10. Norway's Scream Magazine gave God To The Illfated a 3 out of 6 score, arguing that the band evoked their first album too much. Rock Hard gave both albums 8 out of 10.

Legion left the band in 2010 to focus on his career as a tattoo artist. After the other members tried and failed to keep Devian alive, they agreed to disband it.

== Discography ==
- Ninewinged Serpent (2007)
- God to the Illfated (2008)

== Line-up ==
- Joinus - guitar & vocals
- Tomas Nilsson - guitar
- Carl Stjärnlöv - bass
- Emil Dragutinovic - drums
- Legion - vocals (2006–2010)
- Marcus Lundberg - guitar (2006–2007)
- Roberth Karlsson - bass (2007–2008)
