= Hibernus Mortis =

American death metal band

- Origin: Miami, Florida
- Genre: Death metal
- Years active: 1995–present
- Label: Abort the World Records

Hibernus Mortis is a band started in December, 1995 by Cesar Placeres and Ralf Varela. The band name comes from the ancient Latin translation for "Dead Winter" (mortuus hiemis). The band's goal was to create crushing and extreme music, inspired by death metal bands like Incantation, Autopsy, Morbid Angel, Death, Dismember, Immolation, Entombed, Obituary, Vader and Suffocation.

The band's sound is categorized as death metal, with black metal and doom metal influences. Hibernus Mortis is a staple of the Florida death metal scene and has a global fanbase. Fans from Germany, Norway and Iceland, Cuba, South Africa, Singapore, and Australia enjoy Hibernus Mortis. The band has an underground status with a modest cult following. The band is based out of Hialeah, Florida.

== Members ==
Current members

- Cesar Placeres - drums, backing vocals
- Ralf Valera - lead vocals, rhythm guitar
- Yasser Morales - bass
- Randy Piro - lead guitar

Former members

- Adrian Esquivel - bass
- Doug Humlack - lead guitar
- Adam Fleury - lead vocals
- Alex Campbell - lead vocals, rhythm guitar
- David Miller - bass, lead guitar, backing vocals

== Subject matter ==
The band's lyrics as well as overall presentation and imagery have always been set in a bleak and morose atmosphere. The band's songs deal with a wide variety of topics including the apocalypse, death, suffering, revenge, solitude, and hatred. On rare occasion the band has been known to get lyrical inspiration from movies. Two movies in particular have inspired songs: The Prophecy and Urotsukidoji: Legend of the Overfiend.

== Guitar sound ==
One of the band's most distinguishing qualities is their de-tuned and aggressive guitar sound. Hibernus Mortis tunes guitar to "G," which is a rare practice. Aside from the low tuning, the band achieves their sound through the use of thick strings and unconventional equipment.

== Discography ==
Studio albums

- The Existing Realms of Perpetual Sorrow (2002)
- The Monoliths of Cursed Slumber (2022)

Live albums

- Live Manslaughter (2000)

Demos

- Into the Thresholds of Dead Winter (1998)
