= Despite (band) =

Swedish death metal band

- Origin: Gothenburg, Sweden
- Genres: Melodic death metal; progressive metal; thrash metal; mathcore; djent
- Years active: 1998–present
- Label: Dozer
- Members: Peter Tuthill, André Gonzales, Zoran Panovic, Eldor Pettersson, Anthony Cui, Janne Jaloma
- Website: www.despiteofficial.com

Despite is a Swedish death metal band from Gothenburg.

== History ==
The band was formed in 1998. Their debut indie album, In Your Despite, was released in Sweden in March 2009. The album contains the song ”MindPlague”, with guest vocals by Knut Agnred, a Swedish singer and member of the comedy group Galenskaparna och After Shave. In October 2010, the band released their second indie album, Clenched. Record producer Andreas Kleerup helped them out on the track "Commander of Hate". Later, the band parted ways with singer Alex, and Peter Tuthill (ex member of Carnal Forge, Godsic and Construcdead) joined as their new lead singer in December 2012. During the spring of 2013, Despite entered Crehate Studios to record EPic, released in the beginning of 2014. The album was well received among the metal community. MusicReviewRadar wrote "EPic is a refreshing, solid and heavy as f**k album that stands out from the crowd (...) Despite seem to be the real deal, ready to leave the underground and dazzle the entire world with their amazing nordic metal for a really long time". On November 10, 2014 the standalone single "Chaos Trigger" was released. VH1 featured Despite among "15 MORE Metal Bands You Should Be Listening To In 2015".

In December 2014, bassist Mathias Dagerhed quit and Anthony Cui replaced him. At the same time, Despite added a third guitarist, Zoran Panovic. In 2015, they released the single "Praedonum". This was the last recording featuring drummer Oscar Nilsson, who left the band to concentrate on his studio. Drummer Janne Jaloma (ex-Deals Death and Bloodshot Dawn) was recruited shortly after Nilsson's departure. In late 2015-early 2016, Despite recorded their first album, Synergi, released on July 22, 2016 and featuring 13 tracks. This was the first Despite album released through Eclipse Records. First single "As You Bleed" reached the top three of Jose Mangin's show "The Devil's Dozen" on America's satellite metal music radio station, Liquid Metal (Sirius XM), and stayed there for several weeks. Synergi has been praised by critics and fans all over the globe. In May 2016, guitarist and founding member Timmy Leng left Despite. Eldor Pettersson replaced Leng in May 2016. In 2017, Despite released a standalone single of The Prodigy's hit single "Breathe". On February 15, 2019, Despite released the single "Echo Chamber".

== Members ==
Current

- André Gonzales - rhythm guitar (2011–present)
- Peter Tuthill - vocals (2012–present)
- Zoran Panovic - third guitar (2014–present)
- Anthony Cui - bass (2015–present)
- Janne Jaloma - drums (2015–present)
- Eldor Pettersson - lead guitar (2016–present)

Former

- Jimmie Strimell - vocals (1998–2002)
- Daniel Andersén - rhythm guitar (2000–2002)
- Alex Losbäck Holstad - vocals (2007–2011)
- Jonatan "Oktaven" Larsson - rhythm guitar (2010–2011)
- Johan Sporre - rhythm guitar (2009–2009)
- Fredrik Meister - bass (1998–2009)
- John Lidén - rhythm guitar (2006–2009)
- Joseph Astorga - drums (2006–2009)
- Max Ramström - rhythm guitar (1999–2000)
- Michel Kolic - vocals (2011–2012)
- Mathias "Matte D" Dagerhed - bass (2010–2014)
- Oscar Nilsson - drums (2009–2015)
- Timmy Leng - lead guitar (1998–2016)

== Discography ==
- 2009 - In Your Despite (Album)
- 2010 - Clenched (Album)
- 2013 - EPic (EP)
- 2014 - "Chaos Trigger" (Single)
- 2015 - "Praedonum" (Single)
- 2016 - Synergi (Album)
- 2017 - "Breathe" (Single)
- 2019 - "Echo Chamber" (Single)
