= This Ending =

Swedish melodic death metal band

- Also known as: A Canorous Quartet (1991–1993); A Canorous Quintet (1993–1999); The Plague (2005–2006); A Canorous Quintet (2016–present)
- Origin: Stockholm, Sweden
- Genre: Melodic death metal
- Years active: 1991–present
- Label: Black Lion
- Members: Mårten Hansen; Linus Nirbrant; Linkan Pettersson; Peter Nagy
- Past members: Leo Pignon; Fredrik Andersson; Jesper Löfgren

This Ending (formerly A Canorous Quartet) is a Swedish melodic death metal band formed in 1991.

== History ==
This Ending was formed in 1991 as A Canorous Quartet by Fredrik Andersson, Mårten Hansen, and Linus Nirbrant. Leo Pignon and Jesper Löfgren completed the lineup. The band released the EP As Tears in 1994, and two full-length albums, Silence of the World Beyond in 1996 and The Only Pure Hate in 1998. They performed shows with At the Gates, Dissection, Hypocrisy and Edge of Sanity. In 1998, the members disbanded. Hansen joined October Tide, while Nirbrant, Löfgren, and Andersson formed Guidance of Sin, which Andersson left in 1999 to join Amon Amarth.

In 2004, Andersson recorded a five-song demo under the name Curriculum Mortis. In early 2005, the band reformed as This Ending. During the spring and summer, they wrote 13 songs, three of which were chosen for the downloadable demo Let the World Burn, recorded later that year. The band signed with Metal Blade Records, and recorded their first full-length album, Inside the Machine, in September 2006.

In January 2009, the band completed their second studio album, Dead Harvest. The music video for the song "Parasite" premiered on the band's Myspace on 17 January. The album was released on 30 January in Germany, Austria, Switzerland and Italy, 2 February in the rest of Europe, and 3 February in North America.

This Ending left Metal Blade Records in January 2011 and were planning to re-record their A Canorous Quintet material to celebrate their 20th anniversary.

== Band members ==
- Mårten Hansen – vocals
- Peter Nagy – drums
- Linus Nirbrant – guitar
- Linkan Pettersson – bass

== Discography ==
=== As A Canorous Quintet ===
- As Tears (1995)
- Silence of the World Beyond (1996)
- The Only Pure Hate (1998)

=== As This Ending ===
- Inside the Machine (2006)
- Dead Harvest (2009)
- Systematic Worship EP (2012)
- Garden of Death (2016)
- Needles of Rust (2021)
