= List of goregrind bands =

This is a list of bands that play goregrind, a fusion of grindcore music with death metal.

== List of notable bands ==
| Band | Country | Formed | Notes |
|---|---|---|---|
| Carcass | UK | 1985 | |
| Carnal Diafragma | Czechia | 1997 | |
| The County Medical Examiners | USA | 2001 | |
| Dead Infection | Poland | 1990 | |
| General Surgery | Sweden | 1988 | |
| Flactorophia | Ecuador | 2006 | |
| Haemorrhage | Spain | 1990 | |
| Impetigo | USA | 1987 | |
| Inhume | Netherlands | 1994 | |
| Last Days of Humanity | Netherlands | 1989 | |
| Machetazo | Spain | 1994 | |
| Regurgitate | Sweden | 1990 | |
| Vomitorial Corpulence | Australia | 1992 | |

== See also ==
- List of deathgrind bands
