= Gates of Ishtar =

Swedish melodic death metal band

- Also known as: Disrupt (1992-1994)
- Origin: Luleå, Sweden
- Genre: Melodic death metal
- Years active: 1992–1998, 2015–2016, 2022–present
- Labels: Spinefarm, Invasion
- Members: Mikael Sandorf; Andreas Johansson; Tomas Jutenfäldt; Niklas Svensson
- Past members: See below

Gates of Ishtar is a Swedish melodic death metal band.

== History ==
Mikael Sandorf (vocals), Andreas Johansson (drums), Stefan Nilsson (guitar), and Harald Åberg (bass) formed Gates of Ishtar in late 1992 as Disrupt. The band later recruited guitarist Tomas Jutenfäldt. Åberg coined the name "Gates of Ishtar" and Johansson designed the logo.

In May 1995, they recorded Seasons of Frost at Lucichrist studio. This demo led to a contract for a full-length album on Finnish label Spinefarm Records. In 1996, they recorded A Bloodred Path in Finnish studio Tico-Tico. Spinefarm released it in June. Due to popular response, and the band's dissatisfaction with Spinefarm Records, Gates of Ishtar switched to Invasion Records. They signed a two-album deal. The band started work on their second album, The Dawn of Flames.

Before work on their second album began, drummer Oskar Karlsson and guitarist Niklas Lindgren left due to personal disagreements. They recruited live guitarist Henrik Åberg to play drums. Jutenfäldt asked Danjel Röhr to play session bass on The Dawn of Flames. In early 1997, the band travelled to Örebro to record at Unisound studio. On March 25, 1997, the album was released worldwide.

The band reunited in 2015. On March 3, 2016, Karlsson died from heart failure. The band was on hiatus from 2019, though in November 2022, they announced they would play a show in Umeå in 2023.

== Discography ==
- Seasons of Frost (demo) (1995)
- A Bloodred Path (1996)
- The Dawn of Flames (1997)
- At Dusk and Forever (1998)

== Band members ==
=== Current ===
- Mikael Sandorf – vocals (1992–1998, 2015–2016, 2022-present), guitars, bass (1997–1998)
- Andreas Johansson – guitars (1994–1997, 2015–2016, 2022-present), drums (1992–1994)
- Tomas Jutenfäldt – guitars (1994–1997, 2015–2016, 2022-present)
- Markus Parkkila – bass (2024-present)
- Fredrik Andersson – drums (2022-present)

=== Former ===
- Oskar Karlsson – drums (1994–1996, 1997–1998, 2015–2016; died 2016)
- Urban Carlsson – guitars (1997–1998)
- Harald Aberg – bass (1992–1994)
- Stefan Nilsson – guitars (1992–1994)
- Danjel Röhr – bass (1996–1997); died 2022)
- Henrik Åberg – drums (1996–1997)
