= Inevitable End =

Swedish death metal band

- Origin: Jönköping, Småland, Sweden
- Genres: Death metal, grindcore
- Years active: 2003–present
- Label: Relapse
- Members: Marcus Bertilsson; Johan Ylenstrand; Johan Oloffson; Christoffer Jonsson
- Website: inevitable-end.com

Inevitable End are a Swedish death metal band from Jönköping, signed to Relapse Records.

== History ==
Inevitable End started in 2003, and evolved from thrash metal to death metal. The band released two three-song demos, a self-titled album in 2004 and Reversal in 2006, each clocking in around fifteen minutes. After a few years playing thrash metal, the band moved from Jönköping to Gothenburg, where they underwent line-up changes. With a new line-up of Andres Gerden, Marcus Bertilsson, Johan Ylenstrand, and Joakim Malmborg, the quartet spent most of 2007 rehearsing. The band signed to Relapse Records and started recording their first full-length album, The Severed Inception, released March 17, 2009 in North America (March 23 internationally). Inevitable End has toured Norway, Finland, Czech Republic and Switzerland, as well as their home country of Sweden.

== Personnel ==
Current members

- Marcus Bertilsson - guitar
- Johan Ylenstrand - bass (Crimson Moonlight, ex-Miseration)
- Savage - drums
- Christoffer Jonsson - vocals

Former members

- Andres Gerden - vocals
- Joakim Malmborg - drums (ex-Crimson Moonlight)
- Emil Westerdahl - bass
- Joakim Bergquist - vocals/bass
- Magnus Semerson - vocals
- Jonas Arvidson - guitar
- Christoffer Johansson - drums (ex-Shadows of Paragon)

== Discography ==
- Inevitable End (demo, 2004)
- Reversal (demo, 2006)
- The Severed Inception (Relapse, 2009)
- The Oculus (2011)
