= List of grindcore bands =

This is a list of grindcore bands, including bands that perform grindcore fusion genres.

== List ==
=== A ===
- Abaddon Incarnate
- Aborted
- ACxDC
- Agathocles
- Agoraphobic Nosebleed
- Anaal Nathrakh
- Anal Cunt
- Antidemon
- Antigama
- Asesino
- Assück
- Autopsy

=== B ===
- Benümb
- The Berzerker
- Blood Duster
- Bolt Thrower
- Brain Drill
- Brodequin
- Brujeria
- Brutal Truth

=== C ===
- Caninus
- Carcass
- Carnal Diafragma
- Cattle Decapitation
- Cephalic Carnage
- Circle of Dead Children
- Circle Takes the Square
- Cock and Ball Torture
- Converge
- The County Medical Examiners
- Cripple Bastards

=== D ===
- Damaged
- Dance Club Massacre
- Daughters
- Dead Infection
- Defecation
- Deny the Cross
- Despised Icon
- Devourment
- The Dillinger Escape Plan
- Discordance Axis
- Drumcorps
- Dying Fetus

=== E ===
- Ed Gein
- Electro Hippies
- Exhumed
- Extreme Noise Terror
- Extreme Smoke

=== F ===
- The Fall of Troy
- Fantômas
- Fear Factory (early)
- Flactorophia
- Fuck the Facts
- Full of Hell

=== G ===
- General Surgery
- Genghis Tron
- Glass Casket
- Godflesh
- Gore Beyond Necropsy
- Gridlink
- Gut

=== H ===
- Haemorrhage
- Hatebeak
- Head of David
- Head Wound City
- Hellnation
- Hewhocorrupts
- Ho99o9
- Holocausto Canibal
- Human Remains

=== I ===
- Impaled
- Impending Doom
- Impetigo
- In Strict Confidence

=== L ===
- Last Days of Humanity
- Liberteer
- Lock Up
- The Locust

=== M ===
- Macabre
- Magrudergrind
- Maximum the Hormone
- Meathook Seed
- Melt-Banana
- Metanoia
- Misery Index
- Mortician
- Mortification

=== N ===
- Nails
- Naked City
- Napalm Death
- Nasum
- Nuclear Blaze
- The Number Twelve Looks Like You

=== O ===
- Old Lady Drivers
- Orchid

=== P ===
- Painkiller
- Phantomsmasher
- Phobia
- Pig Destroyer

=== R ===
- The Red Chord
- Regurgitate
- Reversal of Man
- Repulsion
- Rotten Sound

=== S ===
- See You Next Tuesday
- Soilent Green
- Sore Throat
- Success Will Write Apocalypse Across the Sky

=== T ===
- Terrorizer
- The Tony Danza Tapdance Extravaganza
- Tortured Conscience
- To Separate The Flesh From The Bones
- Totem Skin
- Trap Them

=== U ===
- Unholy Grave
- United Nations
- Unseen Terror
- URGH!

=== V ===
- Vomitorial Corpulence

=== W ===
- War from a Harlots Mouth
- Wormrot

=== X ===
- Xavlegbmaofffassssitimiwoamndutroabcwapwaeiippohfffx
- Xysma

== See also ==
- List of crust punk bands
- List of hardcore punk bands
- List of crossover thrash bands
- List of death metal bands
- List of heavy metal bands
- List of mathcore bands
- List of deathcore bands
