= The Pleasure Garden =

A pleasure garden is a park or garden open to the public for recreation and entertainment.

The Pleasure Garden may refer to:

- The Pleasure Garden (1925 film), a British silent film directed by Alfred Hitchcock
- The Pleasure Garden (1953 film), a short film written and directed by James Broughton
- The Pleasure Garden (1961 film), a Swedish film directed by Alf Kjellin
- Pleasure Garden (painting) a 1932 watercolour by Frances Hodgkinson
- Pleasure Gardens Theatre, a theatre in Folkestone, Kent, UK, 1886–1964

== See also ==
- Garden of Delights (disambiguation)
