= Hatefilled Vengeance =

EP by Regurgitate
- Released: 29 October 2002
- Recorded: September 2001 at Soundlab Studios
- Genre: Goregrind, grindcore
- Length: 17:06
- Label: Relapse

Regurgitate chronology
Carnivorous Erection (2000)	Hatefilled Vengeance (2002)	Deviant (2003)

Professional ratings
Review scores
Source	Rating
Rock Hard	8/10

Hatefilled Vengeance is an EP by goregrind band Regurgitate, released in 2002 by Relapse Records. It contains some previously released tracks, along with previously unreleased tracks. All previously released tracks were re-recorded for this EP. Tracks 1 - 8 are from Effortless Regurgitation of Bright Red Blood, and tracks 9 and 10 are from the Concrete Human Torture demo.

== Critical reception ==
Ox-Fanzine said the EP is just noise and called riffs simple and lyrics incomprehensible.

== Track list ==
1. Confluent Macular Drug Eruption - 0:22
2. Vulva Fermentation - 0:30
3. Complete Rectal Prolapse - 1:00
4. Testicular Trauma - 1:15
5. Cloudy Grayish Vomitus - 0:19
6. Fleshmangler - 1:07
7. Bulging Vaginal Septum - 0:37
8. Bleeding Peptic Ulcer - 0:47
9. Deranged Menarche Injection - 0:56
10. Drastical Decapitation - 0:58
11. Emethic Jizz Treatment - 1:04
12. Destined To Burn - 1:31
13. Hatefilled Vengeance - 0:39
14. 666 Casualties - 2:23
15. Deathlike Incest - 1:29
16. Choke That Piggy - 0:43
17. Devastation And Nuclear Apocalypse - 0:35
18. Disciples Of Obliteration - 0:52

== Personnel ==
- Rikard Jansson - Vocals
- Urban Skytt - Guitar, bass
- Jocke Pettersson - Drums
