= Forensix =

Studio album by Desecration
- Released: October 15, 2008
- Recorded: July 2008
- Studio: Philia Studios, Henley-on-Thames, UK
- Genre: Death metal
- Length: 29:26
- Label: Metal Age Productions

Desecration chronology
| Process of Decay (2005) | Forensix (2008) | Cemetery Sickness (2014) |

Forensix is the sixth studio album by the death metal band Desecration. It was their first album to be released on Metal Age Productions and to include Andi Morris on bass guitar.

== Track listing ==
All lyrics are written by Desecration; all music is composed by Desecration.

| No. | Title | Length |
|---|---|---|
| 1. | "The Committal" | 0:37 |
| 2. | "Cremains" | 3:03 |
| 3. | "Formaldehigh" | 2:33 |
| 4. | "Overdose" | 3:10 |
| 5. | "Silent Beneath Science" | 2:22 |
| 6. | "Dissecting the Departed" | 3:37 |
| 7. | "Deep Freeze" | 2:23 |
| 8. | "Sadosexual Suicide" | 2:34 |
| 9. | "Aim, Fire, Kill" | 3:05 |
| 10. | "Bonesaw" | 2:53 |
| 11. | "Heatsplit" | 3:09 |
| Total length: | | 29:26 |

== Personnel ==
Desecration

- Andi Morris - Bass, Backing vocals
- Michael Hourihan - Drums
- Ollie Jones - Vocals, Guitar

Production

- Nick Hemingway - Recording, Mixing, Mastering
- Jumali Katani - Artwork
- Dave MacLean - Layout
