= Murder in Mind =

Murder in Mind may refer to:

- Murder in Mind (album), a 1998 album by Desecration
- Murder in Mind (film), a 1997 American film
- Murder in Mind (TV series), a 2001–2003 British television series
