= Egoleech =

Studio album by Cock and Ball Torture
- Released: 14 June 2004
- Genre: Death metal; goregrind
- Length: 36:11
- Label: Morbid Records

Cock and Ball Torture chronology
Sadochismo (2002)	Egoleech (2004)

Egoleech is the third studio album by German goregrind band Cock and Ball Torture. This album shows a shift in the group's style from its trademark pornogrind sound to groove-laden death metal.

== Track listing ==
No.	Title	Length
1.	"Another Arch Abraded"	2:36
2.	"Close Your Eyes and Bear It"	2:28
3.	"Blindfold Bare Submissive"	3:11
4.	"Complex 27"	2:10
5.	"Be Raped Bereaved"	2:36
6.	"She No Longer Cared"	2:49
7.	"Sharp And Slender"	2:29
8.	"Sono Sterile Theory"	3:14
9.	"Thickening"	2:23
10.	"Six Holes Cut"	2:59
11.	"Thirty Degrees Backwards"	2:57
12.	"Contagious"	3:49
13.	"One Inch Left"	2:19

== Personnel ==
- Sascha – vocals, drums
- Tobias – guitar, bass
- Timo – bass
