= Pathway to Deviance =

Studio album by Desecration
- Released: 2002
- Genre: Death metal Black metal
- Label: Copro Records
- Producer: Desecration

Desecration chronology
Inhuman (2000)	Pathway to Deviance (2002)	Gore and PerVersion 2 (2003)

Pathway to Deviance is the fifth album by death metal band Desecration.

== Track listing ==
1. "Cleaver, Saw and Butcher's Knife"
2. "Offer The Flesh"
3. "King of the Missing"
4. "Bloody Human Carvery"
5. "None of us are Saints"
6. "Let's Have A Hanging"
7. "Swollen"
8. "Bathroom Autopsy"
9. "They Bled"
10. "Frosted Breath"

== Reviews ==
Pathway to Deviance received a rating of 4.3/5 at Metal Ireland
