= Ulrikes Dream =

Belgian punk rock band

- Also known as: UD
- Origin: Belgium
- Genres: Punk rock, crust punk, anarcho punk, hardcore punk
- Years active: 1997 – present
- Labels: various
- Members: Erik, Hans, Jochen
- Website: ulrikesdreamleuven.wordpress.com

Ulrikes Dream is a Belgian punk rock band formed in 1997 as Ulrike's Dream. Their line-up has included members of Intestinal Disease, Cop on Fire, The Usual Suspects, Detritus and The League of Mental Men. Their music mixes metal, punk, grindcore and crust punk.

== History ==
Ulrike's Dream played its first show on 27 December 1997 in the cellar of local youth club called Clockwork in Leuven, Belgium. The band opened for Oi Polloi, Accion Mutante and Boycot. In 1999 the band did a short tour in Holland. after releasing their first demo "Burn burn burn... the European Swastika".

After youth club Clockwork shut down, several bandmembers started looking for a new place. They squatted several buildings in the centre of their home town, Leuven. The song "kraken gaat door" (squatting goes on) illustrates this period in time. In the summer of 2001 two bandmembers formed the anarchist ska-punk band The Usual Suspects, but kept playing in Ulrikes Dream. On 7 October 2005 the band played a last show with the current line-up and after that some band members left the band to focus on other projects. Former singer Saar died in March 2006.

The remaining band members looked for kindred spirits and started using the name "Ulrikes Dream" (without the apostrophe). On 2 April 2006 they played their first show at the Rock Café in Leuven with powerviolence band The League of Mental Men. The same year Ulrikes Dream played the "Boycot Marktrock"-festival, an anti-commercial underground festival in a local squat.

Ulrikes Dream played multiple shows in Belgium and abroad. Their first full-length album "Van 9 tot 5" (from nine to five) was released in 2011 by Maloka, an underground record label from Dijon, France.

In January 2017 Ulrikes Dream has recorded a new album that is called "Anarchie in Leuven". In 2019 Hans started a new wave band called Donder, Hel & Hagel.

In 2022, the band celebrated its twenty-fifth anniversary at JH Sojo in Leuven with the release of a live CD called “Levend en Luid”. In 2025, 'Oude School Sterft Nooit' followed—a split EP with grindcore band Agathocles. Vocalists from four different Belgian bands each contributed vocals to a track by Ulrikes Dream: The End of Ernie, Intestinal Disease, Verval and Pesticide. That same year, the band also unveiled its new single Klasse in Opstand during a show at Het Depot in Leuven.

== Influences ==
Ulrikes Dream started as a grindcore band that was very influenced by early anarchopunkbands like Dirt and Crass. After some line-up changes the band musically grew into a more complex style by mixing metal, punk and many other musical genres into one coherent, heavy sound. Ulrikes Dream is influenced by bands like Sepultura, Agathocles, Accion Mutante and even Body Count.

== Members ==
- Hans: Guitar + Vocals
- Erik: Bass
- Jochen: Drums

== Releases ==
=== Own releases ===
- "Klasse in Opstand" single (2025)
- "Oude School Sterft Nooit" split-ep with Agathocles (2025)
- "Levend en Luid" cd (2022)
- "Anarchie in Leuven" full lp (2017)
- "Van 9 tot 5" full cd/lp (2010/2011)
- "Hitters and Runners" 4-way split with Repression O.D., The End of Ernie and Intestinal Disease – ALF-benefit (2002)
- "If it leads ... it bleeds" 7inch ep (2000)
- "Burn Burn Burn... the European Swastika" (1998)

=== Compilations ===
- "Fuck Police Brutality", R-Punk (2020) (digital)
- "Les Racines du Chaos", Deviance records (2018) (2x cd)
- "20 jaar Ulrikes Dream" (2017) (cd-r)
- "Pour une toile libre" (2013) (1 track) (cd)
- "Face Your Underground 12 – The Grind Edition – Deathmetal.be Sampler" (2012)
- "Squattus ex machina" (1 track)(cd): a compilation by the Leuven squatters movement (2005)
- "Unscene effort 2" (2 tracks)(lp)
- "Hageland Strikes Back" (DIY punk/hc compilationtapes)
- "Defense", 3x cassette box set, Crucial Blast (2000)
- Split tape with STERBEHILFE, ABUSO SONORO and NOIZYMUTHA (on Own Control Records)
- Split tape with ANGRY MINDED (live in Nijmegen 1999)
- "Animals have feelings too" (UPSTapes #4) (1 track)
- "Below The Pavement Lies The Beach" (1998) (Black Star Productions)
