= Out of Focus =

Out of Focus may refer to:

== Film and television ==
- "Out of Focus" (Frankie Drake Mysteries), a 2017 television episode
- Out of Focus, a 1990s Israeli TV youth series featuring Moran Atias and others
- Out of Focus, a 2007 Israeli dance film directed by Tomer Heymann

== Music ==
- Out of Focus (band), a German band of the 1970s
- Out of Focus (EP), a 1998 unreleased project by eLZhi, DJ Houseshoes, and DJ Rios
- "Out of Focus", a 2014 song by Brutus
- "Out of Focus", a 1976 jazz duet by Charlie Hadden from The Golden Number
- "Out of Focus", a 1993 song by Mick Jagger from Wandering Spirit (album)

== See also ==
- Defocus aberration, the quality of an image being out of focus
