= Sadochismo =

Studio album by Cock and Ball Torture
- Released: June 2002
- Genre: Goregrind; pornogrind
- Length: 40:59
- Label: Ablated Records

Cock and Ball Torture chronology
Opus(sy) VI (2000)	Sadochismo (2002)	Egoleech (2004)

Sadochismo is the second studio album by German pornogrind band Cock and Ball Torture. It features their most popular track "Aphrodisianus".

== Track listing ==
No.	Title	Length
1.	"Where Girls Learn to Piss on Command"	1:51
2.	"Heterosexual Testosterone Compressor"	2:24
3.	"Enema Bulldozer"	2:05
4.	"Instant Onanizer"	5:20
5.	"Whoredom Sonata"	2:20
6.	"Aphrodisianus"	1:37
7.	"Colon Latino"	3:36
8.	"Kamikaze Incest"	2:55
9.	"Caudal Armada"	2:03
10.	"Multiple Slave Sex"	3:06
11.	"Klistier Power"	2:29
12.	"Faggot Filter"	2:35
13.	"Cellulite Convoy"	2:17
14.	"G-Spot Gigolo"	2:18
15.	"Supreme Genital Goddess"	3:52

== Personnel ==
- Sascha – vocals, drums
- Tobias – guitar, bass
- Timo – bass
