= Raping the Corpse =

Live album by Desecration
- Released: 2005
- Genre: Death metal Black metal
- Label: Apocalyptic Empire Records
- Producer: Desecration

Desecration chronology
Gore and PerVersion 2 (2003)	Raping the Corpse (2005)	Process of Decay (2005)

Raping the Corpse is an EP by death metal band Desecration. The album contains remixes and live recordings and was released to promote the 2003 release of Gore and PerVersion 2.

== Track listing ==
1. "Raping The Corpse (Remix)"
2. "Asphyxiate On Blood (Live)"
3. "Death You'll Face (Live)"
4. "Let's Have A Hanging (Live)"

== Reviews ==
Raping the Corpse received a rating of 4.4/5 at Metal Ireland.
