= Garden of Earthly Delights (disambiguation) =

The Garden of Earthly Delights is a painting by Hieronymus Bosch.

Garden of Earthly Delights may also refer to:

== Arts and media ==
- The Garden of Earthly Delights (1981 film), a film by Stan Brakhage
- The Garden of Earthly Delights (2004 film), a film by Lech Majewski
- The Garden of Earthly Delights (2025 film), a film by Morgan Knibbe
- The Garden of Earthly Delights, a 1985 Drama Desk Award for Unique Theatrical Experience award-winning play
- A Garden of Earthly Delights, a 1967 novel by Joyce Carol Oates

=== Music ===
- "Garden of Earthly Delights", a song by XTC from the album Oranges & Lemons
- "The Garden of Earthly Delights", a song by The United States of America from their self-titled album
- The Garden of Earthly Delights, a 1998 orchestral work by Michael Berkeley
- "The Garden of Earthly Delight", a song by Snakefinger from the album Manual of Errors
- "The Garden of Earthly Delights", a song by SPK from the album Digitalis Ambigua: Gold & Poison
- “The Garden Of Earthly Delights”, a song by Uriel
- "The Garden (of Unearthly Delights)", a progressive rock song by Unitopia
- "The Garden Of Earthly Delights", an album by the Czech goregrind band Carnal Diafragma

== See also ==
- The Garden of Unearthly Delights, an album by British band Cathedral
- The Garden of Unearthly Delights (novel), a 1995 novel by Robert Rankin
- Garden of Delights (disambiguation)
