= Obscene Extreme =

Annual metal music festival in Czechia

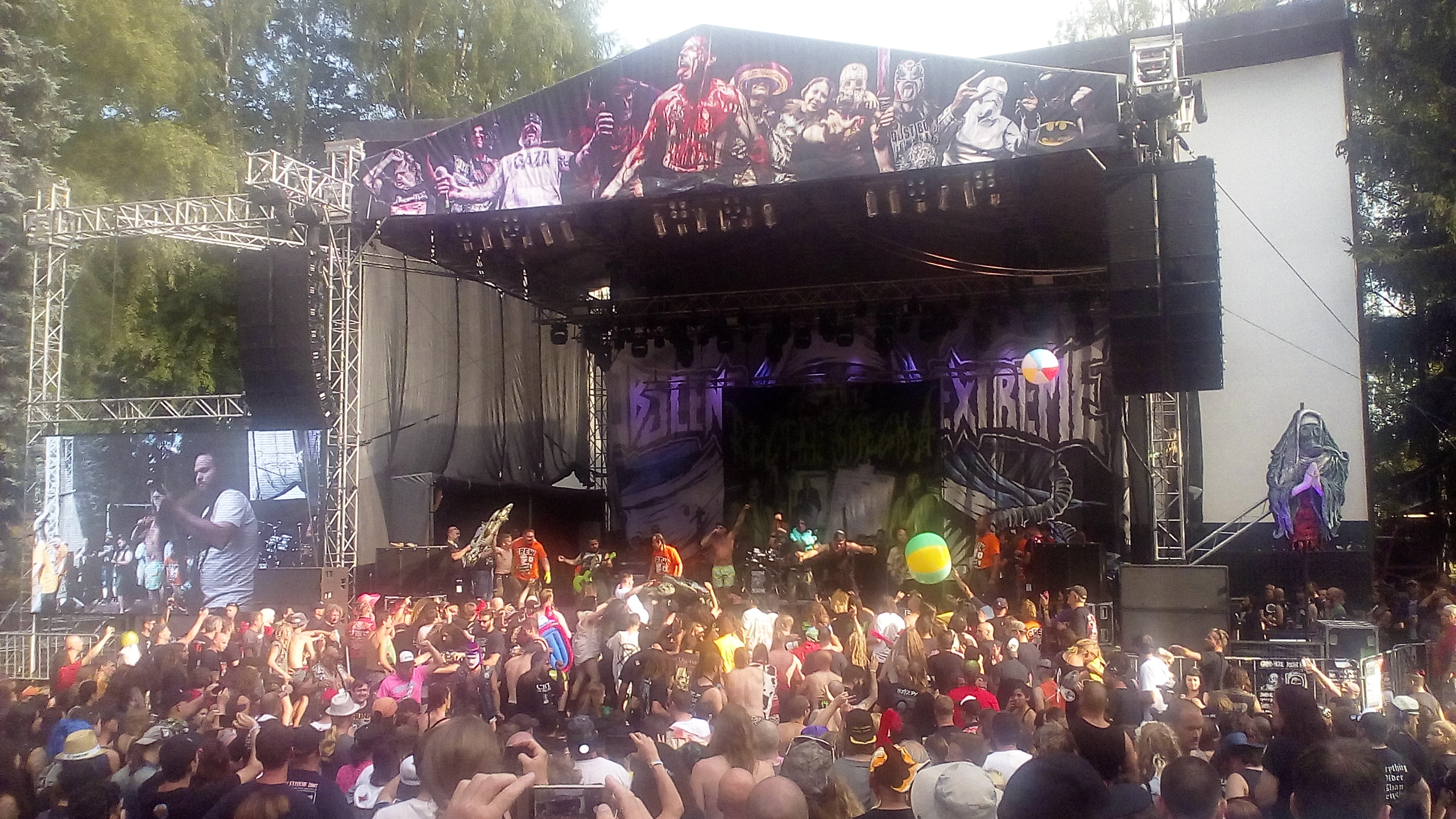
Obscene Extreme in 2018

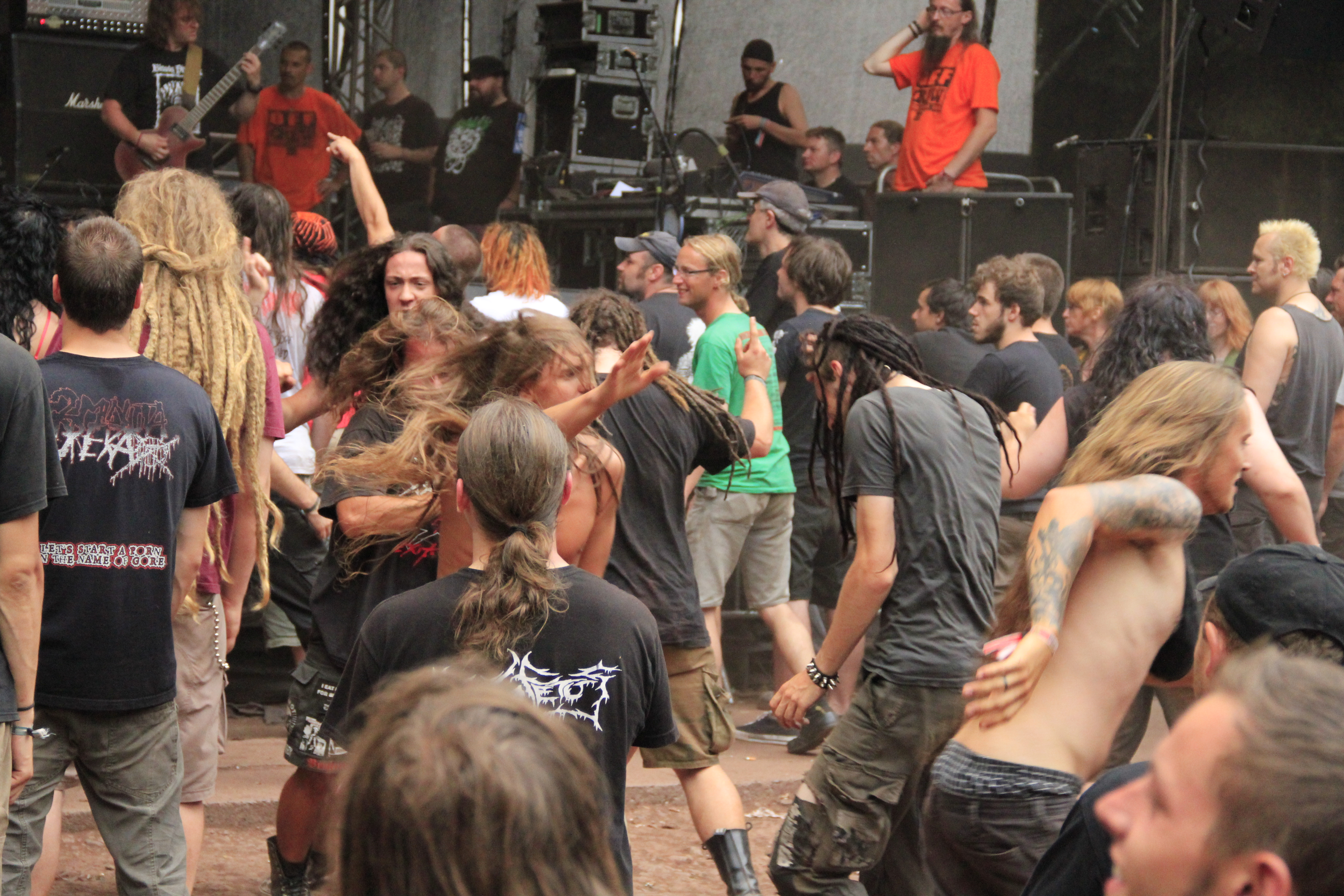
Obscene Extreme in 2010

The Obscene Extreme Festival, shortened as OEF, is an annual music festival in the Czech Republic, that focuses on extreme metal subgenres grindcore and death metal, as well as hardcore punk. It was founded in 1999 as a birthday party by Miloslav "Čurby" Urbanec. It was noted by Czech Radio for its "exceptionally tolerant and friendly atmosphere". The festival offers exclusively vegetarian and vegan food within its premises since its inception.

Several well-known metal bands have performed at OEF over the years, such as Napalm Death, Possessed, Obituary, Sodom, Immolation, Grave, Suffocation, Vader, Incantation, Terrorizer, Exhumed, Asphyx, Morgoth, Brujeria, Sinister, Nuclear Assault, Hirax, Vital Remains, Eyehategod, Krisiun, and Municipal Waste.

In October 2026, the organizers announced the relocation of the Obscene Extreme festival from the Bojiště grounds in Trutnov to Park 360 in Hradec Králové. The first edition at the new venue is scheduled for July 7–11, 2027.

== Line-ups ==
=== 1999 ===
Lineup
- Abortion
- Agathocles
- Appalling Spawn
- Bloodsuckers
- Brainwash
- Cerebral Turbulency
- Cripple Bastards
- Crusher
- Damnable
- Deflorance
- Desecration
- Dread 101
- Entrails Massacre
- Epitome
- F.S.F.I.
- Fleshless
- Gorefield
- Gride
- Grind 6,4
- Immured
- Ingrowing
- Isacaarum
- Lost Soul
- Malignant Tumour
- Mastic Scum
- Melancholy Pessimism
- Mindlock
- Mortura
- Mrtva Budoucnost
- Needful Things
- Onanizer
- Perversist
- Poseydon
- Reinfection
- Sanatorium
- Suffocate
- Tortharry
- Twisted Truth
