= Garden of Delights =

Garden of Delights may refer to:

== Film ==
- Garden of Delights (film) (Il giardino delle delizie), a 1967 Italian film directed by Silvano Agosti
- The Garden of Delights (El jardín de las delicias), a 1970 Spanish drama film

== Literature ==
- Hortus deliciarum (Garden of Delights), 12th century manuscript
- Le jardin des délices (Garden of Delights), 1968 play by Fernando Arrabal
- Le jardin des délices (The Garden of Delights), 1978 book by Roch Carrier and Sheila Fischman
- Gardens of Delight, 2006 book by Erica James

== Music ==
=== Bands ===
- Garden of Delight, a German gothic rock/darkwave group from the 90s.
- Garden of Delight, a gothic

rock group formed in 1982 in Norway.

=== Albums ===
- Garden of Delight, 2008 album by Paul Avgerinos
- Garden of Delights, 2007 album by Out of Focus
- Garden of Delights, 2016 album by Chuck Israels Jazz Orchestra
- The Flute's Garden of Delights, music collection by Jacob van Eyck

=== Songs ===
- "Garden of Delight (Hereafter)", song by The Mission from the album God's Own Medicine
- "Garden of Delight", song by Steelheart from the album Wait
- "Garden of Delight", song demo by My Bloody Valentine recorded prior to the album This Is Your Bloody Valentine
- "Garden of Delights", song by Liz and Lisa from the album Liz and Lisa
  - later recorded by Lisa Loeb & Nine Stories from the album Tails
- "Gardens of Delight", song by Vangelis from the soundtrack album Alexander

== Places ==
- Nishat Bagh, translated to Garden of Delight, a Mughal garden in Srinagar, Kashmir, India
- Jannat al-Na‘īm (Garden of Delight), one of the layers of Jannah

== See also ==
- Garden of Earthly Delights (disambiguation)
- Delights of the Garden, 2002 album by Desmond Williams
- de:Garden of Delight (deutsche Band), German gothic rock/metal band
