= Cripple Bastards =

Italian grindcore band

- Origin: Asti, Piedmont, Italy
- Genres: Grindcore, hardcore punk
- Years active: 1988–present
- Labels: FETO, Relapse
- Members: Giulio the Bastard (vocals); Schintu the Wretched (bass); Der Kommissar (guitar); Raphael Saini (drums)
- Past members: Alberto the Crippler (guitar); Walter Dr. Tomas (drums); Eduardo 'o Brazil (bass); Michele Hoffman (drums); Al Mazzotti (drums)
- Website: Official site

Cripple Bastards is a grindcore band from Asti, Italy. They were formed in 1988 in order to keep their area on the hardcore punk map as most of the other bands around them were breaking up.

== Biography ==
They were formed by vocalist Giulio the Bastard and guitarist Alberto the Crippler. They were initially a metal-influenced punk band called Grimcorpses. However, they were not satisfied with their music and soon decided to make their style more extreme, which was accompanied by a name change. They combined hardcore and metal influences with grindcore, but still managed to sound different from many other grindcore bands at the time. Their first demo shares the tape with two other bands, which also include members of Cripple Bastards. A few more tracks and demos were recorded after this. The band also played various venues including their first ever international concert in Croatia.

By 1994, the band had drafted bassist Eduardo. The following year the band released their first full-length album, Your Lies In Check and drummer Paolo joined the band shortly after. Shortly after their debut album was released, Eduardo left the band and was replaced by Stefano, who was in the same band as Paolo. However, both Paolo and Stefano soon departed, leaving the band with only two members once again. As the years went by, the band made numerous changes in personnel.

The band released Misantropo a Senso Unico in 2000, which was placed at number 6 in Terrorizer's list of essential European grindcore albums, with deputy editor James Hoare describing it as "primitive, punk, pummelling and most importantly given their self-dubbed 'controversial hategrind', genuinely dangerous." This album went in an even more uncompromising direction and was also the last album to feature Alberto the Crippler on guitar. However, members were replaced, and the band formed its most stable line-up.

In 2003, the band released Desperately Insensitive, which had a 'cleaner' sound.

Over the years they have played over 300 shows, many of which were included on three full-length tours (in Europe 2000, the US East Coast 2002 and the US West Coast 2003), as well as several international festivals, including Fuck the Commerce in Germany in 2001, Obscene Extreme in the Czech Republic in 1999, 2000, 2001, 2003, 2006 and 2010, Maryland Deathfest in the US in 2007 and 2011., Brutal Assault in Czech Republic (2009) and Neurotic Deathfest in the Netherlands in 2011. They have shared the stage with bands, such as Brujeria, Napalm Death, Dismember, Suffocation, Pungent Stench, Brutal Truth, Nasum, Ratos de Porão, Extreme Noise Terror, Varukers and Chaos UK.

On 9 September 2014, after 15 years, Cripple Bastards parted ways with drummer Al Mazzotti. The new drummer is Raphael Saini (ex-Iced Earth, ex-Corpse Fucking Art, Chaoswave and a touring member of other bands like Master and Abomination).

The band played at Maryland Deathfest in 2025.

== Members ==
=== Current line-up ===
- Giulio The Bastard - vocals (1988–present) drums (1988–1991, 1997)
- Schintu The Wretched - bass (1998–present)
- Der Kommissar - guitar (2000–present)
- Raphael Saini - drums (2014–present)

=== Previous members ===
- Alberto The Crippler - guitar (1988–2000)
- Michele Hoffman - drums (1991–1995)
- Eduardo 'O' Brazil - bass (1994–1996)
- Paolo Arturo - drums (1995–1996, 1997)
- Stefano Arturo - bass (1996)
- Gigi Pacino - bass (1997)
- Gaba The Drummer - drums (1996-1997)
- Walter Dr. Tomas - drums (1997–1999)
- Fulvio Hatebox - guitar (1998–2000)
- Al Mazzotti - drums (2000–2014)
- Wild Vitto - chitarra (2014–2018)

== Discography ==
=== Albums ===
- Best Crimes compilation CD (1996, Grand Theft Audio)
- Your Lies in Check LP/CD (1996, Ecocentric / EU '91 Produzioni / Dwie Strony Medalu)
- Misantropo a Senso Unico LP/CD (2000, EU '91 Produzioni / Deaf American / Peculio Discos / Insane Society / SelfMadeGod)
- Almost Human compilation CD (2001, Obscene)
- Desperately Insensitive (2003, Deep 6 / Necropolis / Deathvomit)
- Variante Alla Morte (2008, FETO)
- Frammenti di Vita (2010, T.V.O.R.)
- Nero in metastasi (2014, Relapse Records)
- La Fine Cresce da Dentro (2018, Relapse Records)

=== EPs ===
- Split 7" with Violent Headache (1993, Psychomania)
- Split 7" with W.B.I. (1993, Useless)
- Life's Built on Thoughts 7" (1993, A-Wat)
- Split 7" with Patareni (1994, Regurgitated Semen)
- Frammenti di Vita (1994, Ecocentric)
- Split 7" with Social Genocide (1994, ADP)
- Split 7" with Senseless Apocalypse (1994, View Beyond)
- Fear Persuasion Violence Obedience split 10" with Capitalist Casualties, Masskontroll and Warpath (1995, Wiggy)
- Split 7" with Psychotic Noise (1995, Grinding Madness)
- Split 7" with Präparation-H (1996, Vicious Interference)
- Split 7" with Carcass Grinder (1996, Upground)
- Split 7" with Wretched (1996, bootleg)
- Split 10" with Patareni (1996, Havin' a Spazz)
- Split LP with Suppression (1997, Bovine)
- Split CD with P.E.L.M.E., Urban Decay and The Dread (1997, Grand Theft Auto)
- Massacrecore live 7" (1997, Denied a Custom)
- Split 7" with I.R.F. (1998, MCR Company)
- Split 7" with P.E.L.M.E. (1999, Havin' a Spazz)
- Split 7" with World (1999, NAT)
- Live to Hate People 3" CD (1999, Applequince)
- Split 7" with Comrades (2000, SOA)
- Il Grande Silenzio 7" (2000, Rhetoric)
- Split 7" with Corrupted (2001, HG-Fact)
- Split 7" with Regurgitate (2002, EU '91 SerbianLeague)
- Split CD with C.H.C. and Total Fucking Destruction (2003, Mutilation)
- Split 7" with Eyehategod (2004, Southern Lord)
- Split CD with Skruigners and Woptime (2006, Tube)
- Split 7" with Sublime Cadaveric Decomposition (2006, Relapse)
- Senza Impronte 7" (2012, Relapse)

=== Cassettes ===
- Split tape with K.S.G. and Dissonance (1991, EU '91 Produzioni)
- From 1988 to 1991 compilation tape (1991, EU '91 Produzioni)
- Split tape with Dark Season (1992, EU '91 Produzioni)
- Split tape with Agathocles (1992, EU '91 Produzioni)
- Split tape with Filthy Charity, Harsh Feelings and Grimcorpses (1993, EU '91 Produzioni)
- Mundo di Mierda compilation tape (1993, Vomit Halo)
- Punk's Not Music compilation tape (1995, Upbound / Abnormal Tapes)
- Split tape with Nuclear Grinder and Mastic Scum (1997, Impregnate)
- Negativity to Scan Your Mind promo tape (1997, EU '91 Produzioni)
- Split tape with Cuntn' Bananaaz and Fishy (?, Confex)
- Split tape with Mass Separation (?, ALP Tapes)
- Live to Hate People - Best Of (2002, Cryptas)

=== Other releases ===
- Falafel Grind: 32 Bands Proving that Cripple Bastards Suck! tribute album (2000, Obscene)
- Blackmails and Assholism double DVD (2007, Obscene)

=== Compilation appearances ===
- Son of Bbblleeaaauuurrggghh 7" (Slap-a-Ham; two songs)
- Revenge of the Disabled video (Will-'O'-the-Wisp Videos; some songs from From 1988 to 1991)
- Revenge of the Disabled 2 video (Wil-'O'-the-Wisp Videos; Rehearsal 1994, "Gaspacho" soap opera for betrayed husbands and interview)
- Mit mir ist nich zu Rechnen - Benefit für totalverweigerer (Born to Booze; one song)
- Obrade - A Tribute to Patareni (Falsanja Kol'ko's; five songs)
- It's All Quiet on the Eastern Front (Nuclear Sun Punk; one song)
- Part of the Cripple Bastard's show at the Two Days of Struggle hardcore festival, released on Immondo 2 Shockumentary/Videozine (Carnaio)
- Fooling with Pain (Tylyt Levyt; one song)
- Noise Against the Machine 7" (Inner Aural Combustion; one song)
- Pasta Power Violence 7" (SOA; two songs)
- Land Speed Power - Hüsker Dü Covers (Berserk; two songs)
- Europe in Decline (Six Weeks; two songs)
- No Fate 4 (HG-Fact; one song)
- Kill Your Idols - A Tribute to Agathocles (Happy Hamster; one song)
- Pasta Power 2: Speed Kills (SOA; one song)
- Obscene Extreme Festival 1 (Obscene; two songs)
- Speed Freaks 4 7" (Knot Music; one song)
- Tributo Ao Olho Seco (Red Star; one song)
- No Speed Limits Vol. 2 (Civilization; one song)
- Not Without a Fight (Fistfight; five songs)
- Youth Against Police Brutality (Deifer; one song)
- Obscene Extreme 2000 (Obscene; two songs)
- Thrash of the Titans (Know; two songs)
- Obscene Extreme Festival 2001 (Obscene; one song)
- Rotten Display of Culture Vol. 1 video (Porro; live footage)
- Fuck the Commerce IV video (Cudgel Agency; live footage)
- Deadly Encounters Vol. 2 7" (Agitate 96; one song)
- Grind Your Mind: A History of Grindcore (Mayan; two songs)
