= Mangled Remains =

Studio album by Desecration
- Released: 1993
- Genre: Death metal Black metal
- Producer: Desecration

Desecration chronology
Mangled Remains (1993)	Gore and Perversion (1995)

Mangled Remains is the demo of the Welsh death metal band Desecration.

== Track listing ==
1. "Mangled Remains"
2. "Systematic Mutilation"
3. "Festering Innards"
4. "Crave For Rot"
