= Regurgitate (band) =

Swedish goregrind band

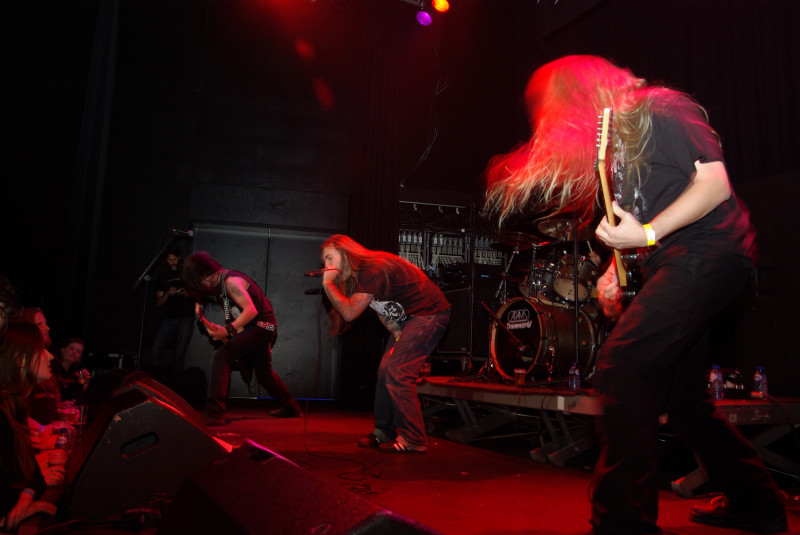
- Regurgitate performing in 2007

Background information
- Origin: Stockholm, Sweden
- Genre: Goregrind
- Years active: 1990–2009
- Label: Relapse
- Past members: Rikard Jansson; Urban Skytt; Johan Jansson; Jocke Pettersson; Peter Stjärnvind; Johan Hanson; Mats Nordrup; Glenn Sykes
- Website: www.regurgitate.net

Regurgitate was a Swedish goregrind band that included members from Stockholm and Mjölby. The band formed in 1990, ended in 2009, and released four full-length albums. They were notable goregrind practitioners. Their best-known album was Carnivorous Erection (2000).

The band's lyrics included placental expulsion and mutilation.

== Tribute ==
In 2001, Bizarre Leprous Productions released a 46-band tribute to Regurgitate, Comeback of Goregods: Tribute to Regurgitate, with bands such as Inhume, Last Days of Humanity, Lymphatic Phlegm, Gore Beyond Necropsy, Haemorrhage, and Neurovisceral Exhumation taking part.

== Band members ==
=== Final lineup ===
- Rikard Jansson – vocals (1990–2009) bass (1992–1994)
- Urban "Ubbe" Skytt – guitar (1993–2009)
- Jocke Pettersson – drums (1999–2009)
- Johan Jansson – bass (2006–2009)

=== Previous members ===
- Johan "Joppe" Hanson – bass (1990–1998)
- Mats Nordrup – drums, guitar (1990–1993)
- Peter Stjärnvind – drums (1993–1998)
- Glenn Sykes – bass (2002–2006)

== Discography ==
=== Full-length albums and EPs ===
- 1994 – Effortless Regurgitation of Bright Red Blood (Lowland Records)
- 2000 – Carnivorous Erection (Relapse Records/Morbid Records)
- 2002 – Hatefilled Vengeance (Relapse Records)
- 2003 – Deviant (Relapse Records)
- 2006 – Sickening Bliss (Relapse Records)

=== Demos and promos ===
- 1991 – Demo 91
- 1994 – Concrete Human Torture
- 1999 – Promo CD 1999

=== Splits ===
- 1992 – Split with Vaginal Massaker (Poserslaughter Records)
- 1993 – Split with Psychotic Noise (Glued Stamps Records)
- 1994 – Split with Grudge (Obliteration Records)
- 1994 – Split with Dead (Poserslaughter Records)
- 1996 – Flesh Mangler Split with Intestinal Infection (Noise Variations)
- 2000 – Split with Filth (Panic Records)
- 2001 – Sodomy and Carnal Assault Split with Gore Beyond Necropsy (No Weak Shit Records)
- 2001 – Scream Bloody Whore Split with Realized (Stuhlgang Records)
- 2002 – Split with Cripple Bastards (E.U.'91 Produzioni)
- 2003 – Bonesplicer Split with Entrails Massacre (Towerviolence Records)
- 2003 – Corruptured Split with Noisear (Regurgitated Semen Records)
- 2003 – 3-Way Live Split with Entrails Massacre and Suppository (Blastwork Records)
- 2003 – Bonesplicer/Baltic Thrash Corps Split 5" with Entrails Massacre
- 2004 – Split with Suppository (Badger Records)
- 2008 – Split with Skullhog
- 2009 – Split with Dead Infection
