= Effortless Regurgitation of Bright Red Blood =

Album by Regurgitate

Studio album by Regurgitate
- Released: 1994
- Recorded: 7/8 & 14/15 May 1994 at the GMB Crematorium
- Genre: Goregrind, d-beat
- Length: 32:55
- Label: Lowland

Regurgitate chronology
Effortless Regurgitation of Bright Red Blood (1994)	Carnivorous Erection (2000)

Effortless Regurgitation of Bright Red Blood is the first full-length album by Regurgitate, released in 1994 by Lowland Records. This version with the original album cover had only one copy pressed, making it sought after by many collectors. It was reissued in 1999 by Relapse Records with a different title - "Effortless Regurgitation...The Torture Sessions", which included bonus tracks from the band's 1994 demo "Concrete Human Torture" and the split releases with Grudge and Psychotic Noise. It also had a new front cover which originates from the Italian supernatural horror film City of the Living Dead.

Professional ratings
Review scores
Source	Rating
Allmusic	2.5/5 stars

== Track list ==
1. "Intro: The Act of Intestinal Regurgitation" – 1:13
2. "Disgorging Foetus" – 1:21
3. "Confluent Macular Drug Eruption" – 0:23
4. "Bullous Impetigo" – 1:22
5. "Fleshfeast" – 1:05
6. "Anorectal Ulceration" – 0:55
7. "Vulva Fermentation" – 0:33
8. "Multicystic Kidney" – 1:33
9. "Mucupurulent Offal Grinder" – 0:18
10. "Total Dismemberment of a Female Corpse" – 1:07
11. "Carnal Cacophony" – 0:47
12. "Vomit Breath" – 0:20
13. "Complete Rectal Prolapse" – 1:00
14. "Testicular Trauma" – 1:11
15. "Genital Cancer" – 1:53
16. "Malignant Tumor" – 1:20
17. "Diffuse Systemic Scerosis" – 0:19
18. "Owner of a Necrotic Intestine" – 0:37
19. "Newborn Regurgitation" – 0:51
20. "Torsion of the Testicle" – 0:32
21. "Worm Eaten Rectum" – 0:50
22. "Chronic Lymphatic Leukemie" – 1:23
23. "Metal Ulcer" – 0:34
24. "Purulent Discharge from the Urethra" – 1:10
25. "Vaginal Obstriction" – 1:14
26. "Cloudy, Grayish Vomitus" – 0:22
27. "Fleshmangler" – 1:08
28. "Splattered Brains" (Agathocles cover) – 1:00
29. "Bulging Vaginal Septum" – 0:39
30. "Acute Urinary Infection" – 1:08
31. "Severe Necroses of the Face" – 0:22
32. "Bleeding Peptic Ulcer" – 0:43
33. "Face Mutilation" – 0:35
34. "Extensive Ulcerative Tumor" – 0:41
35. "Tumecent Foetal Fluids to Expurgate" – 0:55
36. "Carbonized Bowels – 0:43
37. "Effortless Regurgitation of Bright Red Blood" – 1:18

== Personnel ==
- Rikard Jansson – vocals
- Urban Skytt – guitar
- Johan Jansson – bass
- Peter Stjärnvind – drums
