= Malignant Tumour =

Czech metal band

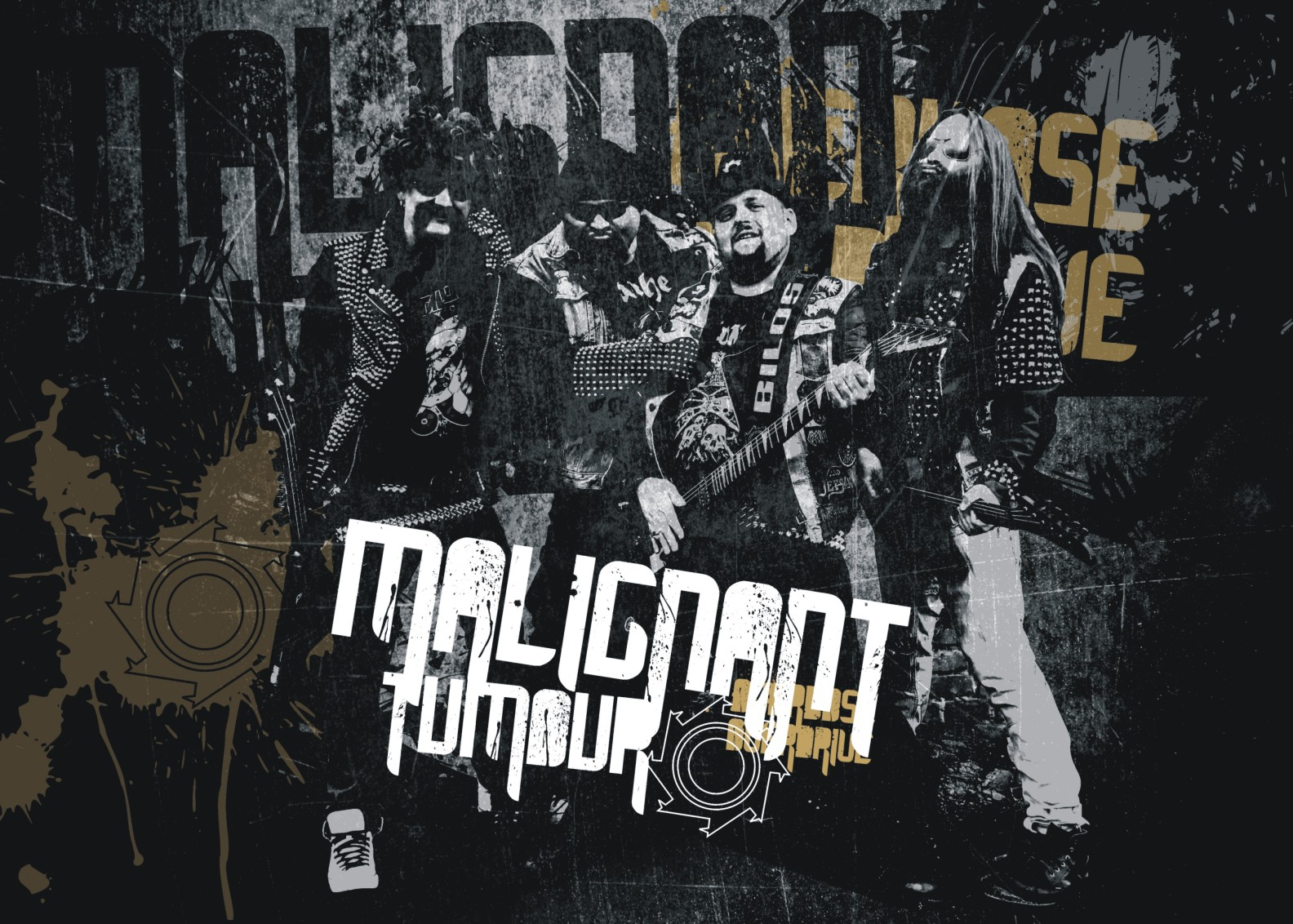
- Malignant Tumour in 2013

Background information
- Origin: Ostrava, Czech Republic
- Genres: Crust punk; heavy metal; biker metal; grindcore (early)
- Years active: 1991–present
- Labels: Insanesociety; Metalage; War Anthem; Unrest
- Members: Martin Bílek; Robert Šimek; Martin Vyorálek; Petr Bohda
- Past members: Roman Restel; Libor Šmakal; Michal Cichý; Otto Beran; Marek Pavlík; Richard Chrobok; Michal Kaminský; Petr Šarina; Marek Marunič; Jelle Smit; Johan Smit; Martin Ondejka; David Ševčík
- Website: malignanttumour.com

Malignant Tumour is a Czech metal band formed in 1991 in Ostrava. The group's lineup has changed many times over the years, with only vocalist and founding member Martin Bílek remaining to this day. The rest of the band consists of bassist Robert Šimek, guitarist Martin Vyorálek, and drummer Petr Bohda. As of 2026, they have released six studio albums, two EPs, and numerous split albums with other musicians. The band has won several Břitva music polls, and in 2010, they received an Anděl Award in the Hard & Heavy category.

== History ==
=== 1991–1997: Formative years ===
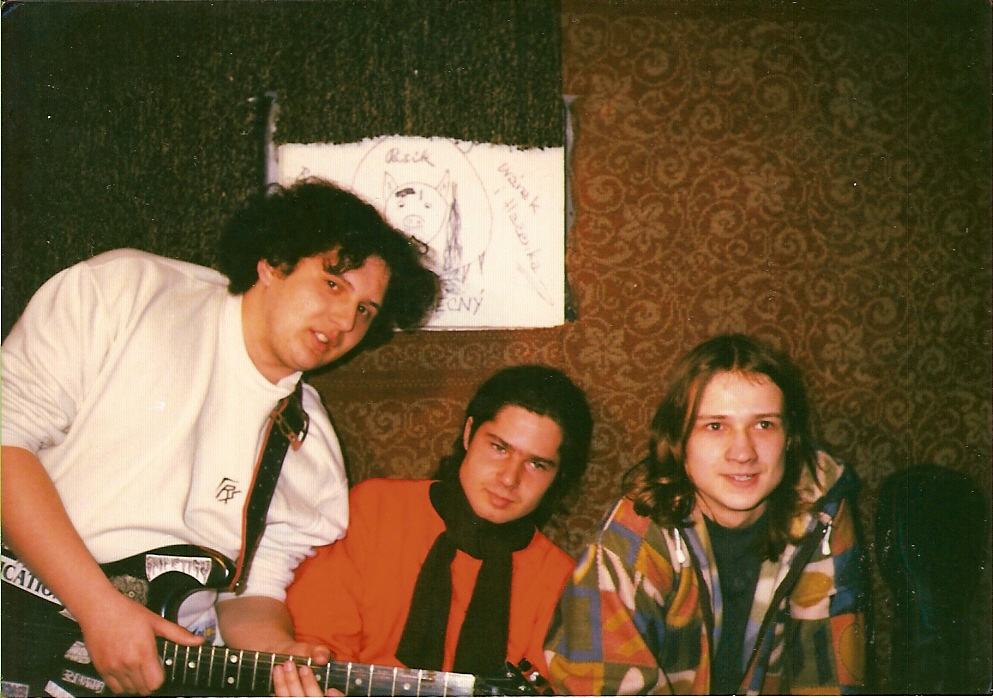
Bilos, Roman, Cichoň (1995)

Malignant Tumour was formed in Ostrava at the end of 1991 by Martin "Bilos" Bílek and Roman Restel, at the ages of 15 and 14, respectively. When drummer Libor Šmakal joined in 1992, their style became influenced by the work of British grindcore band Carcass. In this lineup, they recorded their early demo tapes Cadaveric Incubator of Endo-Parasites (1993), Symphonies for Pathologist (1994), and Analyse of Pathological Conceptions (1995). In late 1995, Šmakal was replaced by Michal "Cichoň" Cichý, leading to Restel departing as well and being replaced by Otto Beran. The same year, Malignant Tumour released a split EP with Decomposed, titled Malignus Morbus. This was followed a year later by three more split EPs: Forensic Clinicism – The Sanguine Article with Immured, Sick Sinus Syndrome with Mastic Scum, and Swarming of Virulency with Ingrowing.

In 1997, the band released a compilation EP titled Hungry Urinary Urn, split with Negligent Collateral Collapse, C.S.S.O., and Catasexual Urge Motivation, as well as a split album with Squash Bowels, titled Eat the Flesh... and Vomica. Cichý and Beran left the band shortly after.

=== 1997–2001: Equality!? ===
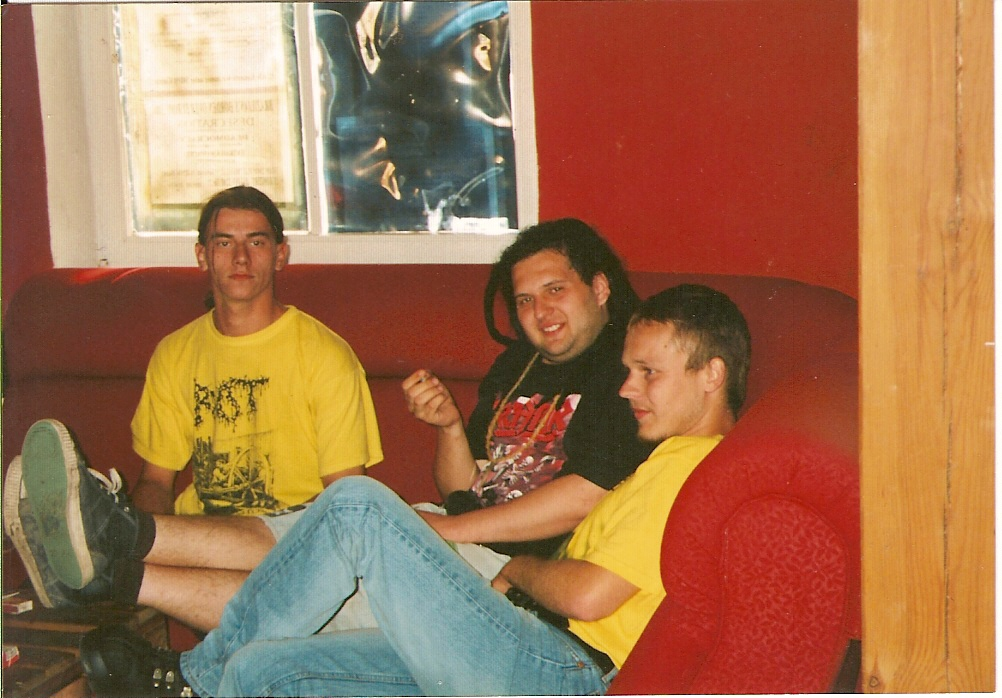
Kameň, Bilos, Marek (2000)

In 1997, Marek "Švejk" Pavlík was hired to play drums, just as Bilos took over bass duties—leading to Richard Chrobok coming onboard as the band's guitarist. Around this time, the theme of the band's lyrics changed from pathological topics to socially aware ones—opposing homophobia, inequality, racism, and slavery. Malignant Tumour went on to record the demo tape Killing for Profit in 1997 and the split EPs Rock Stars – Money Wars with Dead Infection and Murder for You to Eat with Vomito, in 1998. This was followed by another split album, Is This the Earth's Last Century?, with Alienation Mental, and their first solo EP, Equality!?, also in 1998. At the end of the year, drummer Švejk left the band and Cichoň returned.

Cichý was soon replaced by Michal "Kameň" Kaminsky, and Chrobok departed in mid-2000, being replaced by Marek Marunič. The band then recorded and released two split EPs: ...And Man Made the End with Agathocles and Get to Attack with Unholy Grave.

=== 2001–2003: Relocation to the Netherlands and Dawn of the New Age ===
In 2001, Bilos relocated from the Czech Republic to the Netherlands, where an entirely new lineup was formed, including brothers Johan and Jelle Smits on drums and bass, respectively. They released the split EP Oegstgeest Grindcore with Intumescence in 2002. A year later, they issued the double split EP In Oil We Trust with Critical Madness, Szargyerek, and Anubis, as well as their first full-length album, Dawn of the New Age. Bilos returned to Ostrava in mid-2003.

=== 2003–2007: Burninhell ===
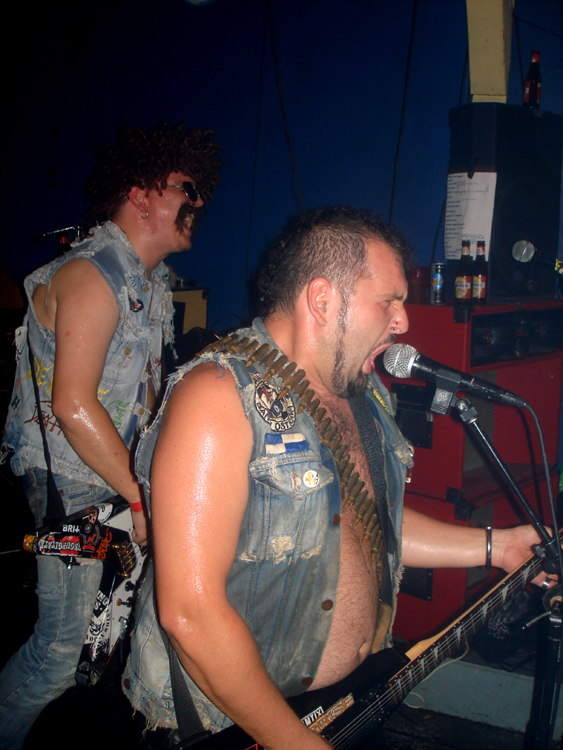
Malignant Tumour in 2007

Once back in the Czech Republic, Malignant Tumour added Robert Šimek on bass and Martin "Marsel" Ondejka on drums. In 2004, they released the split EP Hammer and Anvil with Lycathrophy. Marsel died later that year and was replaced by David Ševčík. A year later, the band issued their second full-length album, Burninhell. It featured a guest appearance by guitarist Martin "Korál" Vyorálek, who later became a permanent member of the band. The record won second place in the Album of the Year category of that year's Břitva music poll. In 2006, they recorded their next split LP, titled R'n'R Engine, with Gurkha, which won third place in that year's Břitva music poll.

=== 2007–2012: In Full Swing and Earthshaker ===
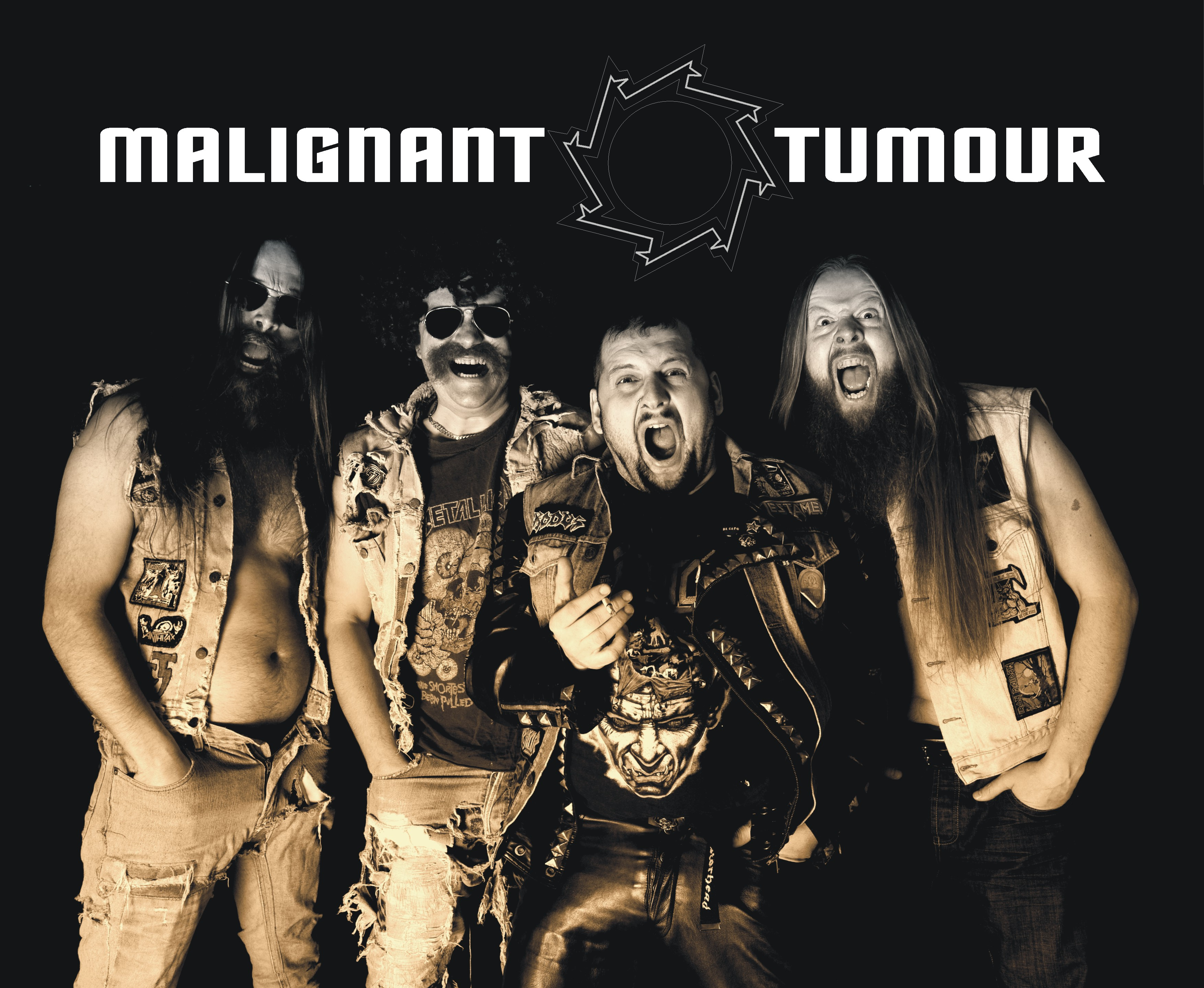
Korál, Šimek, Bilos, David (2010)

In 2008, Malignant Tumour released their next album, In Full Swing. It received praise from critics, some of whom compared the band to Motörhead. The record won the Břitva music polls for Album of the Year, and Malignant Tumour was named Live Band of the Year. The record was also nominated for Album of the Year at that year's Anděl Awards, in the Hard & Heavy category.

Two years later, the group went to work on a new record, with Andy Classen—the first time they had hired a professional producer. Earthshaker received praise from reviewers, won Album of the Year at the 2010 Anděl Awards in the Hard & Heavy category, and reached second place in the Břitva poll.

=== 2012–present: Overdose & Overdrive, The Metallist and Maximum Rock 'n' Roll ===
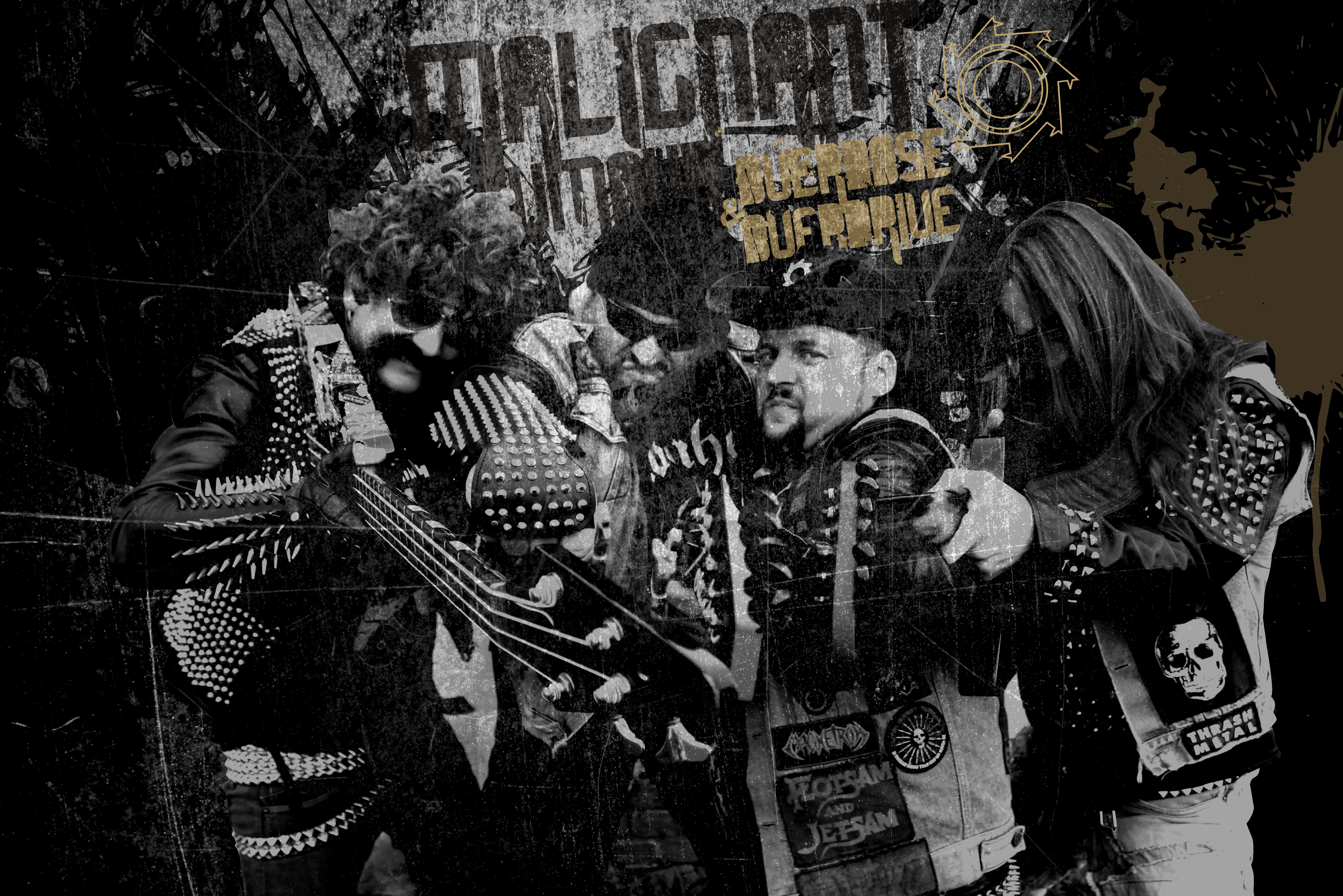
Šimek, Bohdič, Bilos, Korál (2013)

In December 2012, drummer David Ševčík left the band, and his place was taken by Petr "Bohdič" Bohda. In early 2013, Malignant Tumour entered the studio once more to record their next album, Overdose & Overdrive, again with Andy Classen as producer. The record came out in time for the band to go on tour that spring, including a stint at Neurotic Deathfest, in the Netherlands. Dutch death metal vocalist Martin van Drunen ranked Overdose & Overdrive as the best metal album of 2013.

Malignant Tumour issued their subsequent record, The Metallist, in 2016. This was followed the same year by The Way of Metallist 1991–2016, a DVD retrospective of the band's career to date. The film was submitted to the 2016 Czech Lion Awards. The band's seventh studio album, Maximum Rock 'n' Roll, came out in September 2024.

== Band members ==
Current

- Martin "Bilos" Bílek – vocals (1991–present), guitar (1991–1997; 2001–present), bass (1997–2001)
- Robert Šimek – bass, backing vocals (2003–present)
- Martin "Korál" Vyorálek – guitar, backing vocals (2006–present)
- Petr "Bohdič" Bohda – drums (2013–present)

Past

- Roman Restel – bass (1991–1995)
- Libor Šmakal – drums (1993–1995)
- Michal "Cichoň" Cichý – drums (1995–1997)
- Otto "Oťas" Beran – bass (1995–1996)
- Marek "Švejk" Pavlík – drums (1997–1999)
- Richard Chrobok – lead guitar (1997–1999)
- Michal "Kameň" Kaminský – drums (1999–2001)
- Petr "Dino" Šarina – bass (2001)
- Marek Marunič – guitar (2000)
- Jelle Smit – bass (2001–2003)
- Johan Smit – drums (2001–2003)
- Martin "Marsel" Ondejka – drums (2003–2005)
- David Ševčík – drums (2005–2013)

Timeline

== Discography ==
=== Studio albums ===
Full

- Dawn of the New Age (2003)
- Burninhell (2005)
- In Full Swing (2008)
- Earthshaker (2010)
- Overdose & Overdrive (2013)
- The Metallist (2016)
- Maximum Rock 'n' Roll (2024)

Split

- Eat the Flesh... and Vomica – split with Squash Bowels (1997)
- Is This Earth's Last Century? – split with Alienation Mental (1998)
- R'n'R Engine – split with Gurkha (2006)

Other

- Four-way split with Agathocles / Abortion / Din-Addict (1998)
- Demos / Singles Collection '94–'98 (2002)
- Grinding Party – split with Pulmonary Fibrosis (2003)
- And Some Sick Parts Rotting Out There (compilation, 2010)

=== EPs ===
Full

- Equality!? (1998)
- We Are the Metal – limited edition issued with In Full Swing (2008)

Split

- Malignus Morbus – split with Decomposed (1995)
- Forensic Clinicism – The Sanguine Article – split with Immured (1996)
- Sick Sinus Syndrome – split with Mastic Scum (1996)
- Swarming of Virulency – split with Ingrowing (1996)
- Hungry Urinary URN – split with Negligent Collateral Collapse / C.S.S.O. / Catasexual Urge Motivation (1997)
- Rock Stars – Money Wars – split with Dead Infection (1998)
- Murder for You to Eat – split with Vomito (1998)
- ...And Man Made the End – split with Agathocles (2000)
- Get to Attack – split with Unholy Grave (2000)
- Oegstgeest Grindcore – split with Intumescence (2002)
- In Oil We Trust – split with Critical Madnes / Szargyerek / Anubis (2003)
- Hammer and Anvil – split with Lycanthrophy (2004)
- Nación de Metaleros – split with Acidez (2014)

=== Demos ===
- Cadaveric Incubator of Endo-Parasites (1993)
- Symphonies for Pathologist (1994)
- Analyse of Pathological Conceptions (1995)
- Killing for Profit (1997)

== Videography ==
Music videos

- "Clearance of Century" (2005)
- "Saddam Hussein Is Rock 'n Roll" (2006)
- "We Are the Metal" (2008)
- "Dressed to Kill" (2008)
- "Earthshaker" (2010)
- "Overdose & Overdrive" (2013)
- "At Full Throttle" (2014)
- "Walk as We Talk" (2016)

Live videos

- "Infernör" – live from Obscene Extreme (2008)
- "Bristroll" – live as support for Slayer (2008)
- "Satan Rise" – live from Obscene Extreme (2010)
- "Metal Artillery" – live as support for Slayer (2012)
- "Secret Source" – live from Brutal Assault (2013)

DVDs

- Burning Sensation Tour Wildwest Tour (2005)
- Satan Is Real Tour – limited edition with R'n'R Engine (2006)
- Europe Football Championship (2007)
- The Way of Metallist 1991–2016 (2016)

Others

- SmogOva Zona – documentary/music series (2012)

== Awards and nominations ==
=== Anděl Awards ===
Year	Nominee / work	Award	Result
2008	In Full Swing	Hard & Heavy Album of the Year	Nominated
2010	Earthshaker	Hard & Heavy Album of the Year	Won

=== Břitva Music Poll ===
Year	Nominee / work	Award	Result
2005	Burninhell	Album of the Year	Nominated
2006	R'n'R Engine	Mini Album of the Year	Nominated
2008	In Full Swing	Album of the Year	Won
2008	Malignant Tumour	Live Band of the Year	Won
2010	Earthshaker	Album of the Year	Nominated
2010	"Earthshaker" video	Music Video of the Decade	Won
2010	20th Anniversary Concert	Concert & Festival of the Year	Nominated
2013	Overdose & Overdrive	Album of the Year	Nominated
2013	"Overdose & Overdrive" video	Music Video of the Year	Nominated
2014	"At Full Throttle" video	Music Video of the Year	Won
2016	The Metallist	Album of the Year	Nominated
2016	The Way of Metallist	Video of the Year	Won
2016	"Walk as We Talk" video	Music Video of the Year	Won
2016	Back to the 1991 Anniversary Concert	Concert & Festival of the Year	Nominated
2016	Back to the 1991 Anniversary Concert	Delight of the Year	Nominated
2016	The Way of Metallist	Delight of the Year	Won
2024	Maximum Rock'n'Roll	Album of the Year	Nominated
2024	"Maximum Rock'n'Roll" video	Music Video of the Year	Won

=== Czech Lion Awards ===
Year	Nominee / work	Award	Result
2016	The Way of Metallist	Documentary Film of the Year	Entered
