= Stillborn Climax =

EP by Desecration
- Released: 1998
- Genres: Death metal Black metal
- Label: Trauma Records
- Producer: Desecration

Desecration chronology
Murder in Mind (1998)	Stillborn Climax (1998)	Inhuman (2000)

Stillborn Climax is a 7" single by death metal band Desecration. Released on Trauma Records, it was the second of the band's releases to be banned.

== Track listing ==
1. "Stillborn Climax"
2. "Incestual Sodomy"
3. "Obscene Publication"

Written by:

- Paul Arlett
- Glenn Thomas
- Jason Jad Davies
- John Young
