= Carnivorous Erection =

Studio album by Regurgitate
- Released: 20 October 2000
- Genre: Goregrind
- Length: 33:02
- Labels: Relapse Records; Morbid Records (Picture LP)

Regurgitate chronology
| Effortless Regurgitation of Bright Red Blood (1994) | Carnivorous Erection (2000) | Hatefilled Vengeance (2002) |

Professional ratings
Review scores
| Source | Rating |
|---|---|
| Allmusic | 2.5/5 stars |

Carnivorous Erection is the second full-length album by goregrind band Regurgitate. It was released on 20 October 2000 by Relapse Records. The picture LP version was released in 2001 by Morbid Records. The album cover was named the worst album cover of all time by the staff of Pitchfork and was named one of 50 "most controversial hard rock album covers" by Loudwire.

== Background and recording ==
The album was recorded at Soundlab Studios in Orebro, Sweden.

== Critical reception ==
AllMusic gave the album two and a half stars out of five.

== Track listing ==
1. "The Pulsating Feast" - 1:37
2. "Domination Through Mutilation" - 0:54
3. "Escort Service of the Dead" - 1:06
4. "Obscene Body Slayings" - 0:35
5. "Fecal Freak" - 1:58
6. "Humiliated in Your Own Blood" - 0:18
7. "Just Another Stillborn" - 0:44
8. "Parade of the Decapitated Midgets" - 1:04
9. "Ruptured Remains in a Doggybag" - 0:33
10. "Copious Head Carnage" - 1:03
11. "Carnivorous Erection" - 1:29
12. "Relentless Pursuit of Rotting Flesh" - 0:35
13. "Swallow the Human Filth" - 1:05
14. "Dismantle the Afterbirth" - 0:38
15. "Choked in Shit" - 0:55
16. "Funeral Genocide" - 0:13
17. "Rancid Head of Splatter" - 1:23
18. "Rage Against Humanity" - 0:56
19. "To Boil a Corpse" - 0:45
20. "Bloody Pile of Human Waste" - 0:48
21. "Drenched in Cattleblood" - 1:06
22. "Carbonated Death" - 1:04
23. "Skull of Shit and Sludge" - 0:40
24. "Desperate Need for Violation" - 0:21
25. "37 Stabwounds" - 0:24
26. "Vomified (Regurgitated to the Core)" - 1:00
27. "Headless She Died" - 0:33
28. "Breath Like Rotten Meat" - 1:01
29. "I Wanna Kill" - 0:45
30. "Claw-Hammer Castration" - 1:00
31. "Festering Embryonic Vomit" - 0:39
32. "Smeared with Bloodmixed Semen" - 0:40
33. "You're About to Fuckin' Die" - 0:21
34. "Stinking Genital Warts" - 0:24
35. "Pyronecrobestiality" - 1:35
36. "Self-Disembowelment" - 0:34
37. "Savage Gorewhore" - 0:35
38. "The Combustion and Consumption of Pyorrheic Waste" - 1:27

== Personnel ==
- Rikard Jansson – vocals
- Urban Skytt – guitar, bass
- Jocke Pettersson – drums
