= Sickening Bliss =

Studio album by Regurgitate
- Released: North America - 17 October 2006; International - 23 October 2006
- Recorded: April – May 2006 at the Backbones Studio
- Genre: Goregrind, grindcore
- Length: 36:09
- Label: Relapse
- Producer: Regurgitate & Patrik Jonsson

Regurgitate chronology
Deviant (2003)	Sickening Bliss (2006)

Professional ratings
Review scores
Source	Rating
Allmusic	link

Sickening Bliss is the fourth and final studio album by Swedish goregrind band Regurgitate, released in 2006 by Relapse Records. For vinyl releases, there is the yellow splatter vinyl limited to 1000, red limited to 500, and clear limited to 100. There is also a censored cover that focuses on the woman's face and does not show her holding her intestines on a baby's blanket.

== Track listing ==
1. "Bliss" - 0:35
2. "Abducens Eminence" - 0:57
3. "Euphoric State of Butchery" - 0:59
4. "Cocoon of Filth" - 0:49
5. "Putrid Serenity" - 1:44
6. "Tenderizing the Malformed" - 1:36
7. "Violent Necrophilic Climax" - 1:31
8. "Cavernous Sores" - 1:24
9. "Reborn in Latrinic Ecstasy" - 1:27
10. "Bleed on Me" - 2:22
11. "Gutrot Hogfrenzy" - 0:51
12. "Undying Lust for Cadaverous Molestation" - 1:25
13. "Battered with a Brick" - 1:12
14. "Devoured by Ghouls" - 1:13
15. "Addiction (an Unconditional Love for Blasphemous Perversions)" - 1:17
16. "(We Are) Sadistic Hateful Scum" - 2:08
17. "Worm Eater" - 1:35
18. "Perish in Blood" - 1:18
19. "Upheaval of Human Entrails" - 1:11
20. "Bathed in Feculence" - 1:21
21. "Bestial Sons of Devastation" - 1:18
22. "Defile" - 1:50
23. "Deterioration of Grated Genitals" - 1:20
24. "Excremental Investment" - 0:43
25. "Hacksaw Hysterectomy" - 0:55
26. "Catatonic Possession" - 2:54

== Personnel ==
- Rikard Jansson - vocals
- Urban Skytt - guitar
- Glenn Sykes - bass
- Jocke Pettersson - drums

== Production ==
- Arranged by Regurgitate
- Produced & recorded by Regurgitate & Patrik Jonsson
- Mixed & mastered by Jocke "Necro-Nudist" Pettersson
