= Nero in metastasi =

Studio album by Cripple Bastards
- Released: February 18, 2014
- Recorded: June 2013 – September 2013 at Studio Fredman in Gotheburg, Sweden; July 2013 at Toxic Basement Studio in Milan, Italy (vocals)
- Genre: Grindcore
- Length: 36:39
- Label: Relapse
- Producer: Cripple Bastards

Cripple Bastards chronology
Frammenti di vita (2011)	Nero in metastasi (2014)

Professional ratings
Review scores
Source	Rating
Metal Injection	9/10 stars

Nero in metastasi is the sixth studio album by Italian grindcore band Cripple Bastards. It was released on February 17. 2014 via Relapse Records.

== Track listing ==
All lyrics are written by Giulio the Bastard

No.	Title	Length
1.	"Malato terminale"	2:44
2.	"Fumo passivo"	0:58
3.	"Strage di ostacoli"	1:53
4.	"Regime artificiale"	1:54
5.	"Lapide rimossa"	2:30
6.	"Promo-parassita"	1:25
7.	"Soggetto leucemico"	0:16
8.	"Passi falsi"	0:46
9.	"Occhi trapiantati"	3:48
10.	"Anima in disgregazione"	1:08
11.	"Senza impronte"	2:06
12.	"Nemico a terra"	2:20
13.	"L'apice estremo"	0:12
14.	"Sconfitto di ritorno"	1:56
15.	"Agonia di un rientro forzato"	2:06
16.	"Marcatori positivi"	1:28
17.	"Splendore e tenebra"	9:03
18.	"Morti asintomatiche"	0:06
Total length:		36:39

== Personnel ==
- Giulio the Bastard - vocals
- Schintu the Wretched - bass
- Der Kommissar - guitar
- Wild Vitto - guitar
- Al Mazzotti - drums

Guest/session musicians

- Gianluca Fontana - backing vocals
- Marco Guasconi - backing vocals
- Nino the Bastard - backing vocals
- Twys - electronics

Production

- Fredrik Nordström - recording, mixing
- Peter In De Betou - mastering
- Carlo "The Hand of Doom" Altobelli - vocal recording
- Nicola Fornasari - layout, art direction
- Mauro Galligani - photography (front cover)
- Shyla Nicodemi - photography (band)
- Angela Arnone - lyric translations
- Henrik Udd - recording, mixing
