= Deviant (Regurgitate album) =

Studio album by Regurgitate
- Released: 29 July 2003
- Recorded: November 2002
- Genre: Goregrind, grindcore
- Length: 31:53
- Label: Relapse

Regurgitate chronology
| Hatefilled Vengeance (2002) | Deviant (2003) | Sickening Bliss (2006) |

Professional ratings
Review scores
| Source | Rating |
|---|---|
| Allmusic | 4.5/5 stars |

Deviant is the third album by Swedish goregrind band Regurgitate. It was released in 2003 by Relapse Records. It was released in Japan on 2 May 2003.

== Track listing ==
1. "Drowning in Filth" – 1:14
2. "Embrace Obscenity and Kiss the Eruption of Destruction" – 0:57
3. "Seal Your Doom" – 1:09
4. "Grotesque Anoplasty" – 0:51
5. "Blind Fiends of Chaos" – 1:54
6. "Visions of Sodomy" – 0:37
7. "Severe Necrotic Manifesto" – 1:43
8. "Annihilation Meets Depravation" – 1:04
9. "Amphigory" – 0:45
10. "Screams of Death Your God Won't Hear" – 1:14
11. "Reeking Hellhole" – 0:31
12. "Lethean Sleep" – 0:29
13. "Waging War on Benevolence" – 1:03
14. "Exterminate the Virtuous" – 1:54
15. "Alone in Oblivion" – 1:18
16. "Deviant Malpratice" – 1:21
17. "The Ultimate Enslavement" – 1:06
18. "Systematic Demoralization" – 1:24
19. "Unfed" – 0:24
20. "Manipulation Reigns Supreme" – 1:39
21. "Charred Remains (Unseen Terror)" – 1:17
22. "Crossed Out Existence" – 1:18
23. "Vice and Iniquity" – 1:14
24. "Lobotochrist" – 0:36
25. "Twisted Rhymes of Perversion" – 1:51
26. "Depopulation of the Human Race" – 0:47
27. "Life Falls Before Our Feet" – 2:13

== Personnel ==
- Rikard Jansson – vocals
- Urban Skytt – guitar
- Glenn Sykes – bass, vocals
- Jocke Pettersson – drums
