= Process of Decay =

Process Of Decay

Studio album by Desecration
- Released: 2005
- Studios: Philia Studios, Henley-on-Thames
- Genres: Death metal Black metal
- Label: Copro Records
- Producers: Desecration, Dan Turner

Desecration chronology
Raping the Corpse (2005)	Process Of Decay (2005)	Forensix (2008)

Process of Decay is a concept album by death metal band Desecration. The album portrays the complete decomposition of a corpse between death and burial.

Panagiotis Koutsompogeras of Metal Temple Magazine rated the album a 7 out of 10. He wrote: "Extreme drumming interrupted by heavy rhythm parts construct Desecration's evil and ill minded scenery. Thrash and Death metal passages add intensity and interest to the whole album."

== Track listing ==
- All songs written and arranged by Desecration.
1. "When The Heart Stops Beating..."
2. "Initial Decay"
3. "Bacterial Breakdown"
4. "Black Putrefaction"
5. "Butyric Fermentation"
6. "Maggots In Evidence"
7. "Corpse Fauna"
8. "Dry Rot"
9. "Grave Wax"
