= Desecration (band) =

British death metal band

- Origin: Newport, South Wales
- Genre: Death metal
- Years active: 1992–present
- Labels: Metal Age, Copro, Apocalyptic Empire, Trauma
- Members: Ollie Jones; Michael Hourihan; Richard Moore

Desecration are a British death metal band formed in Newport, South Wales in 1992.

The line-up of Desecration has mostly consisted of Ollie Jones and Michael Hourihan, joined by various different bassists and guitarists over the years. Jason Davies played drums from 1994 until 1997, Ollie played drums until Michael joined in 1998. The band's second album had Ollie on drums and upon release Michael joined as drummer.

== History ==
Formed in 1992, and releasing their first demo in 1993, the band caused controversy in 1995 when their debut album Gore and Perversion (original version on Anoxic Records) was infamously seized and incinerated by the local police due to the album's offensive content, for what they deemed to be its obscene nature, and banned upon release. The printers of the original artwork and lyrics, after taking the money for the pressing and without sending any copies to the band, sent the albums to the police authorities and were subsequently incinerated. Band members were arrested. The ensuing court case and media furore firmly established the name Desecration in the South Wales scene and beyond. The album was later released with a black cover featuring the statement "SORRY! Censored by the authorities. Original artwork can be obtained from Arctic Serenades. Send an IRC.", now out of print, by Arctic Serenades.

The album was subsequently re-recorded in 2001 and re-released on 7 April 2003 as Gore & PerVersion 2. It was re-pressed as a white disc edition, the first 50 copies have been signed and numbered by Ollie and Mic and were only available from the band.

The band was told to tone down the lyrics or forget about the music business. This did not happen however, and after three years of fine-tuning their style, Desecration recorded the album Murder in Mind.

The band has since released several albums and gone on many more tours with the likes of Decapitated, Extreme Noise Terror, Vader, Deicide and Morbid Angel.

== Band members ==
=== Current members ===
- Ollie Jones (Amputated, Extreme Noise Terror)
  - bass, drums, vocals, guitar: 1993–present
- Michael Hourihan (Tigertailz, Onslaught, Parricide (aka The Love Grid, a founding member) (UK), Extreme Noise Terror, Akb'al, Perigo Minas, Scruff (bass) (Cardiff), Stormcrow (founding member, Cardiff rock cover band))
  - drums: 1998–present
- Richard Moore, bass 2019–present

=== Past members ===
- Andi Morris – bass 2005–2019
- Pete Davies – bass 2003–2005
- Lee Evans – guitars 2002
- Jules Hay – guitars 2001–2002
- Paul Arlett – guitars 1993–1997
- John Young – bass 1996–2003
- Glenn Thomas – guitars 1993–2001
- Jason Davies – drums 1993–1998
- Mathew Young – bass 1990–1993 (died 2001)
- John Waggenaar – guitars 1997–2000

== Discography ==
Release date	Record	Format	Record company	Notes
1993	Mangled Remains	Tape Demo	Unknown	N/A
1995	Gore and Perversion	CD Album	Arctic Serenades	Original version on Anoxic Records (Banned on release). A few hundred copies were sold with a black "SORRY! Censored by the authorities. Original artwork can be obtained from Arctic Serenades. Send an IRC." cover, now out of print with original banned artwork printed on the actual CD).
1998	Murder in Mind	Album	Copro Records	N/A
1998	Murder in Mind (Live)	Live Album	MMS Records	N/A
1998	Stillborn Climax	7"	Trauma Records	Banned
2000	Inhuman	CD Album	Copro Records	N/A
Unknown	Musick Terror Volume One	CD Album	Morbid Records (2)	Track 'Turning Black' (3:06)
2001	Obscene Extreme	Festival CD, Compilation	Unknown	Featuring Desecration
2002	Pathway to Deviance	CD Album	Copro Records	N/A
2002	Pathway to Deviance	12" Vinyl Picture Disc Album	Copro Records	Limited Edition of 500 copies
2003	Gore and Perversion	Tape Album	Unknown	N/A
2003	Gore and PerVersion 2	CD Album	Copro Records	Originally banned but subsequently re-recorded in 2001 (by vocalist/guitarist Ollie Jones, bassist Pete Davies, and drummer Mick Hourihan) and re-released on 7 April 2003 as 'Gore & PerVersion 2'. It was later repressed as a white disc edition, the first 50 copies have been signed and numbered by Ollie and Mic and were only available from the band. Limited Edition signed and hand numbered available
2003	Obscene Extreme	Festival DVD, Double DVD	Unknown	
2003	Obscene Extreme	Festival CD, Compilation	Unknown	featuring Desecration
2004	Inhuman	CD Album	Copro Records	Remastered containing bonus live video footage. Rereleased with totally different cover art/layout and live videos of: King Of The Missing, Asphyxiate On Blood)
2004	Murder in Mind	CD Album	Copro Records	Remastered containing bonus live video footage. 12-inch LP version released by Hells Headbangers Records in 2004. LP version includes 1993 "Mangled Remains" demo.)
2005	Raping the Corpse	7"	Apocalyptic Empire Records 2003	500 hand-numbered copies. Red vinyl, 33 rpm
2005	Process of Decay	CD Album	Copro Records	Released in the US by Epitomite Productions in 2007 with different cover art/layout.
2008	Forensix	CD Album	Metal Age Productions 2008	N/A
2008	Obscene Extreme	Festival CD, Compilation	Unknown	Featuring Desecration and Extreme Noise Terror (Ollie and Mic's other band)
2009	Metal Age Productions 2009 Sampler	CD Compilation	Metal Age Productions	Track 'Aim, Fire, Kill' (3:04)
2014	Cemetery Sickness	CD Album	Metal Age Productions 2014	Released as stone-grey vinyl also, 33 rpm. Grindscene released the album as a digipak CD in 2015 featuring two extra tracks
2014	Process of Decay	10" Splatter Vinyl Album	Grave Wax Records 2014	Limited Edition of 500 copies including an exclusive live track 'Grave Wax'
2015	Welsh Death Metal Bastards	DVD	Grave Wax Records 2015	Featuring live clips from around the world and official video, slideshow, karaoke, guitaraoke!
2015	Gore & Perversion	Unofficial release	Veterans Records 2015	Limited to 300 copies, this CD has the uncensored artwork on the front cover and the lyrics inside the booklet. The only time it has been released as it was originally intended
2015	20 Years of Perversion and Gore	rare tracks and demos, Compilation	Trauma Records 2015	Unofficial CD, comes with poster and postcard
2016	Intravisceral Exhibition/Grave Secrets	7"	Grave Wax Records 2016	Split picture disc EP with Holocausto Canibal. This is an exclusive track and a track from Cemetery Sickness that has been remixed for the single
