= Unholy Grave =

Japanese grindcore band

- Origin: Nagoya, Japan
- Genres: Grindcore
- Years active: 1993-present

Unholy Grave is a Japanese grindcore band that formed in 1993 and are based in the city of Nagoya. The band got its name from the song "Beyond the Unholy Grave" by the American death metal band Death. Unholy Grave's lyrics mainly focus on political and social issues. A common phrase appearing on the artwork of the band's releases is "Grindcore Against Terrorism!". Unholy Grave are known for being highly prolific, releasing a considerably large amount of splits.

== Band members ==
=== Current ===
- Takaho Komatsu - vocals (1993–present)
- Tee - guitar (1993–present)

=== Former ===
- Chucky - drums (1998-2006)
- Naito - drums (1997-2006)
- Ume - bass (1993-2012)
- Osamu - bass (1993)
- Debuzo - drums (1993-2012)
- Kajisa - guitar (1995-2012)
- Kaz - drums (1999-2014)
- Hee-Chung - drums (2008-2015; r.i.p. 2015)
- Yasu - bass (1999–2021; r.i.p. 2021)

== Politics ==
The band is of interest to the Chinese Government due their track "Taiwan - Another China". Chinese Border Police actively search for the bands content on visitors to China.

== Releases ==
=== Demos ===
- Death Comes From Nowhere [1993]
- Nerve Gas Attack [1996]

=== Splits ===
==== Split 7"s ====
- w/ Aberrant
- w/ Abigail
- w/ Abstain
- w/ Agathocles (1996)
- w/ Archagathus (To Live a Lie Records)
- w/ Black Sister (problem? records)
- w/ Blindspot AD
- w/ Blood I Bleed
- w/ Boltstein
- w/ Čad
- w/ Capitalist Casualties (2000 copies; Deaf American Records)
- w/ Captain 3 Leg
- w/ Catheter
- w/ Chickenshit
- w/ Corrupt Humanity
- w/ David Carradine
- w/ Depressor
- w/ Deranged Insane
- w/ Disgust (Japan) (Agromosh Records)
- w/ Dropdead (2003)
- w/ Embalming Theatre
- w/ Entrails Massacre(1997)
- w/ Gang Up on Against
- w/ Godstomper
- w/ Gorgonized Dorks (2006, 200 copies grey/black, 300 copies black; DSK Records)
- w/ The Grade Grubbers (2007, 200 copies vanilla blue, 300 copies black; DSK Records)
- w/ Gyarandu
- w/ Idi Amin
- w/ The Index
- w/ Ingravescent Torture
- w/ Iron Butter (300 on blue wax, 700 on black wax)
- w/ Kadaverficker (Power It Up)
- w/ Kerum
- w/ Krush
- w/ Little Bastards (2007, 200 copies red, 300 copies black; DSK Records)
- w/ The Mad Thrashers
- w/ Malignant Tumour
- w/ Matka Teresa
- w/ Mitten Spider (Agromosh Records)
- w/ My Mind's Mine
- w/ Na'kay 5"
- w/ Nausea (US)
- w/ Nunslaughter (Hells Headbangers)
- w/ Pretty Little Flower (Rescued from Life Records)
- w/ Sabbat
- w/ Sewn Shut
- w/ Shank
- w/ Straight Edge Kegger
- w/ Taste of Fear
- w/ Terrorism
- w/ Third Degree
- w/ Tripscope
- w/ Unbiased (Agromosh Records)
- w/ Vanishing Act
- w/ Violent Headache
- w/ Waking Terror

==== Split CDs ====
- Agatho-Grave w/ Agathocles (Japanese pressing)(2003)
- w/ Anarchus
- w/ Logger Head
- w/ Mass Separation
- w/ Mind Collage
- w/ Plague Rages
- w/ Rotten Sound
- w/ SCUM

==== Split LPs ====
- w/ Agathocles
- Agatho-Grave w/ Agathocles (US pressing)
- w/ Trauma Acustico

=== EPs ===
- Against Terrorism 7"
- Aussie Disorder Double 7" (live – 2004, 300 copies blue, 700 copies black; Agromosh Records)
- Chaotic Raw Madness 7" (live – 2002)
- Fanaticism 7" (Rescued from Life Records)
- Kill 'Em All for One 7"
- Morbid Reality 7" (1996)
- Nein 7"
- Never Repeat 7"
- Raw Grind Mayhem 8" (limited to 100 copies; Rescued from Life Records)
- Raw Slaughter (Agromosh Records)
- Terror 7" (1997)
- Unholy Bastards (Agromosh Records)
- Unholy Grind Destruction 7" picture disc (live)
- The Unreleased 7" (2004)
- Zero Hour 7"

=== LPs ===
- Lunatic Brain Distraught (limited to 105 copies green)
- Nostalgia
- Obliterated(2006)
- Tortured Alive 10" (live)
- Raw Chaos(2005)
- Revoltage (500 copies yellow with purple splatter; Agromosh Records)
- UK Discharge (live – 1000 copies; Agromosh Records)
- Angry Raw Grinder (490 copies orange; Noiseville)

=== CDs ===
- Crucified (1995)
- Cryptic Dirty Conformity (2005)
- Ethnocide (2004)
- Hatred? (1997)
- Inhumanity (1996)
- Terroraging Crisis (2007)

== See also ==
- List of grindcore bands
