= Cock and Ball Torture (band) =

German goregrind band

Background information
- Origin: Altenmarkt an der Alz, Bayern, Germany
- Genres: Goregrind; pornogrind; death metal
- Years active: 1997–present
- Labels: Shredded; Bizarre Leprous; Stuhlgang; Noweakshit; Lofty Storm; Unmatched Brutality; Ablated; Morbid; Obliteration
- Members: Sascha Pahlke; Timo Pahlke; Tobias Augustin
- Website: cockandball.de

Cock and Ball Torture (also known as CBT) is a German goregrind band formed on 22 February 1997. The group is known for its groove-heavy riffing and pitchshifted vocals as well as its pornography-themed imagery and song titles. Cock and Ball Torture has been acclaimed as one of the more-noteworthy acts in the pornogrind subgenre.

The band has explored themes including sodomy.

== Members ==
=== Current ===
- Timo Pahlke – bass, vocals (1997–present)
- Sascha Pahlke – drums, vocals (1997–present)
- Tobias Augustin – guitar, vocals (1997–present)

=== Past ===
- Sebastian Denizard – vocals (1998–2002)

== Discography ==
=== Albums ===
- 2000: Opus(sy) VI (Shredded Records)
- 2002: Sadochismo (Ablated Records)
- 2004: Egoleech (Morbid Records)

=== EPs and split albums ===
- 1998: Cocktales (Shredded Records)
- 1999: Veni, Vidi, Spunky split with Squash Bowels (Bizarre Leprous Productions)
- 2000: Zoophilia split with Libido Airbag (Stuhlgang Records)
- 2000: Anal Cadaver split with Grossmember (Noweakshit Records)
- 2001: Barefoot and Hungry split with Disgorge (Lofty Storm Records)
- 2001: Big Tits, Big Dicks split EP with Last Days of Humanity (Unmatched Brutality Records)
- 2001: Split with Filth, Negligent Collateral Collapse, and Downthroat (Bizarre Leprous Productions)
- 2002: Where Girls Learn to Piss on Command (Stuhlgang Records)

=== Compilation albums ===
- 2006: A Cacophonous Collection (Obliteration Records)
