= Cemetery Sickness =

2014 studio album by Desecration

Studio album by Desecration
- Released: June 26, 2014
- Recorded: 2014
- Genre: Death metal
- Label: Metal Age Productions

Cemetery Sickness is the eighth studio album by Welsh death metal band Desecration, released on 26 June 2014 by Metal Age Productions. A digital edition followed later in the year. The record continues the band's old-school, gore-soaked death metal approach and was promoted with a video for "Coffin Smasher".

== Background and release ==
Cemetery Sickness marked Desecration’s first full-length since 2008’s Forensix, arriving via Slovak label Metal Age Productions on 26 June 2014. A digital version appeared on major platforms in December 2014.

== Music and lyrics ==
Reviewers characterised the album as a fast, old-school death metal set with terse, hook-driven songs and gore-themed lyrics.

== Track listing ==
1. "Cemetery Sickness"
2. "Coffin Smasher"
3. "I, Cadaver"
4. "Recipes of Horror"
5. "Rotten Brain Extraction"
6. "Cunt Full of Maggots"
7. "Cabletie Castrator"
8. "Mortuary Debauchery"
9. "Tactile Necrophile"
10. "Cut Up and Fed to the Dog"
11. "Grave Secrets"

== Personnel ==
Adapted from contemporary reviews and coverage.

- Ollie Jones – vocals, guitars
- Andi Morris – bass
- Michael Hourihan – drums

== Release history ==
Region	Date	Format	Label
Europe	26 June 2014	CD, LP	Metal Age Productions
Worldwide	9 December 2014	Digital download/streaming	Metal Age Productions
