= Gore Beyond Necropsy =

Japanese grindcore band

- Origin: Kanagawa, Japan
- Genres: Grindcore, psychobilly, noise rock, hardcore punk
- Years active: 1989–present
- Labels: Relapse, HG Fact, Prolapse
- Members: Mamoru Ohmichi; Akinobu Ohtaki; Kiyonobu Ohtaki; Hironori Kobayashi; Hayato

Gore Beyond Necropsy (GBN) (currently known as Noise A-Go-Go's) is a Japanese band formed in 1989 in Hadano city, Kanagawa prefecture. The group have had a prolific output of releases. They play a hybrid style of chaotic grindcore which they refer to as "Analdrillinggrind Harshit Core!!".

In 1997, Gore Beyond Necropsy undertook their first tour outside Japan when they toured Australia with Victoria's Warsore and returned the compliment by arranging Japanese dates for Warsore and issuing a split 7-inch single through Sterilized Decay Records. As well as doing numerous split releases, they have also collaborated with Japanese noise artist Merzbow. Their shared album Rectal Anarchy release by Relapse Records was far from subtle; the album cover was graced by an enlarged anus and the songs were warped cover versions revolving around the theme of scat.

In 2005, the band changed its name to Noise A-Go-Go's.

== Discography ==
- 1991 - Rehearsal Demo [cassette] (Self Released)
- 1991 - Promo Live Tape '91 [cassette] (Self Released)
- 1992 - I Recommend You... Amputation [cassette] (Self Released)
- 1993 - This Is an EP You Want [7-inch] (Malodorous Mangled Innards Records)
- 1994 - Gore Beyond Necropsy / GUT split [7-inch] (Malodorous Mangled Innards Records)
- 1994 - Promo Live Tape '94 [cassette] (Macabre Productions)
- 1995 - Rectal Grinder Merzbow collaboration [7-inch] (Mangrove Records)
- 1995 - Faecal Noise Holocaust [7-inch] (Icy Illusions Records)
- 1996 - Gore Beyond Necropsy / Senseless Apocalypse Split [7-inch] (Blurred Records)
- 1996 - Gore Beyond Necropsy / Disgorge Split [CD] (Dry Retch Records)
- 1997 - Rectal Anarchy Merzbow collaboration [CD/LP] (Relapse Records)
- 1998 - Sounds Like Shit [7-inch] (Blurred Records)
- 1998 - Live & Rehearsal '98 [cassette] (Harshit Records)
- 1998 - Gore Beyond Necropsy / Minch split [7-inch] (Mink Records)
- 1998 - Gore Beyond Necropsy / Warsore split [7-inch] (Sterilized Decay Records)
- 1998 - Noise-A-Go Go!!! [CD] (Relapse Records)
- 1999 - Go! Filth Go!!! [CD] (Infernal Records)
- 2000 - Wizards of Gore - A Tribute to Impetigo [CD] (Razorback Records)
- 2000 - Gore Beyond Necropsy / Arsedestroyer split [7-inch] (Devour Records)
- 2001 - Sodomy and Carnal Assault split with Regurgitate [7-inch] (No Weak Shit Records)
- 2001 - A Tribute to Regurgitate Compilation [CD] (Bizarre Leprous Production)
- 2002 - Fullthröttle Chaös Grind Machine [7-inch] (Blurred Records)
- 2003 - Wild & Frantic! Rock'n'Roll Special!!! [7-inch] (HG Fact Records)
- 2003 - Triple Shocks!!! Freaknoise Show split with Arsedestroyer and Nikudorei [12-inch] (Meatbox Records / Harshit Records)
- 2005 - Filthiest Babies Alive split with Nunwhore Commando 666 [CD] (Prolapse Records)
- 2007 - Rock'n'Noise Grind'n'Roll [CD] (HG Fact)

== Members ==
- Akinobu Ohtaki - bass, vocals
- Hayato - drums
- Kiyonobu Ohtaki - guitar
- Hironori Kobayashi - guitar, noise
- Mamoru Ohmichi - vocals
