= Carnal Diafragma =

Czech metal band

- Origin: Ostrava, Czech Republic
- Genres: Goregrind
- Years active: 1997–present
- Labels: Khaaranus; Lecter; Bizarre Leprous
- Members: Martin Vašek; Robert Rožanski; David Sněhota; Lukáš Jelínek
- Past members: Milan Jaňák; Michal Kaminski; Lukáš Stejskal; Ondřej Podešva; Libor Philipp; Martin Sněhota
- Website: carnaldiafragma.wz.cz

Carnal Diafragma is a Czech goregrind band formed in 1997 in Ostrava. The band's songs do not include any lyrics. Known for their instrumental songs, the band has experienced several lineup changes throughout its history. They have released four studio albums as well as a number of demos and split albums with other groups.

== History ==
Carnal Diafragma was formed in Ostrava in 1997 by Robert "Rožan" Rožanski (guitar, vocals), Milan Jaňák (vocals), and Michal "Kameň" Kaminski (drums). The band played noise and grindcore, occasionally touching on pornogrind themes, before settling on their current genre of goregrind. They were joined by Lukáš "Stezi" Stejskal on bass, though he left in 2000 and was replaced by David "Sabon" Sněhota. In 2001, Stezi returned and the band recorded their first album, Preparation of Patients for the Examination. In 2003, Carnal Diafragma released a split EP with German band Ulcerrhoea. A year later, they released the demo cassette Daddy's Steak. Following this, Stezi definitively left the band. In 2006, Carnal Diafragma recorded their second full-length album, Space Symphony Around Us. Kameň left the band at this point and was replaced by Ondřej "Prune" Podešva. In 2009, Sabon and Prune left and the band took on Libor "Porky" Philipp on drums and Martin "Sabon" Sněhota (David's brother) on bass. In 2011, Carnal Diafragma recorded their third album, Planet of Children's Heads, and the two Sněhota brothers switched places once more. In 2015, Milan Jaňák left the band and singer Martin "Kino" Vašek was hired in his place. That year, Grind Monsters, a split EP with Mexican band Fecalizer, was issued. A year later, the band's fourth studio album, titled Grind Restaurant pana Septika, came out. In June 2017, Porky left the band and was replaced by current drummer Lukáš Jelínek.

== Band members ==
=== Current ===
- Robert "Rožan" Rožanski – guitar, vocals (1997–present)
- David "Sabon" Sněhota – bass (2000–present)
- Martin "Kino" Vašek – vocals (2015–present)
- Lukáš Jelínek – drums (2017–present)

=== Past ===
- Lukáš "Stezi" Stejskal – bass (1997–2004)
- Michal "Kameň" Kaminski – drums (1997–2006)
- Milan Jaňák – vocals (1997–2015)
- Ondřej "Prune" Podešva – drums (2006–2009)
- Martin "Sabon" Sněhota – bass (2009–2012)
- Libor "Porky" Philipp – drums (2009–2017)

== Discography ==
=== Studio albums ===
- Preparation of the Patients for Examination (2001)
- Space Symphony Around Us (2006)
- Planet of Children's Heads (2011)
- Grind Restaurant pana Septika (2017)

=== Other albums ===
- We Cut Your Head and Fuck Your Neck (demo, 1998)
- 3-way split with Pissed Cunt and Rabies (1998)
- Live in Havířov (live demo, 1999)
- split with P.I.T. (2001)
- split with Ulcerrhoea (EP, 2003)
- Amore Mio (6-way split cassette, 2003)
- split with Bizarre Embalming (2004)
- Daddy's Steak (demo, 2004)
- split with Pulmonary Fibrosis (2004)
- Grind Monsters (split with Fecalizer, 2015)
- split with Purulent Spermcanal (2020)
