= Dead Infection =

Polish goregrind band

- Origin: Białystok, Poland
- Genre: Goregrind
- Years active: 1990-2020
- Labels: Obliteration Records, Selfmadegod Records, Morbid Records, Obscene Productions
- Spinoff of: Front Terror
- Website: www.myspace.com/deadinfection

Dead Infection was a Polish goregrind band that Cyjan and Domin (ex-members of grindcore band Front Terror) founded in 1990. Since their formation, the band has released a few full-length albums and 7-inch EPs. They are the second band from Poland, after Vader, to make a deal to release a CD/LP with a non-European label. Their second album, A Chapter Of Accidents, is considered by many a milestone of goregrind music. They played numerous live shows around the world, across Europe, the United States, South America, Mexico, and Japan. In February 2020, Cyjan died, which led to the group's disbandment.

== Members ==
last line-up

- Cyjan - drums (1990-2020; died 2020)
- Pierścień - guitar, vocals (2005-2020)
- Bielemuk - guitar (2019-2020)

=== Former members ===
- Domin - guitar, vocals (1990)
- Kelner - bass, guitar, vocals (1990-1991, 1992-1994)
- Mały - guitar (1990-1999)
- Tocha - guitar (1991-2006)
- Gołąb - bass, vocals (1991-1992)
- Jaro - vocals (1994-2006)
- Huzar - guitar (2003)
- Hal - bass, vocals (2006-2011)
- Lis - bass (2011-2012)
- Yaro - bass (2014-2015)
- Vertherry - bass (2016-2018)

== Discography ==
=== Studio albums ===
- 1993: Surgical Disembowelment (CD/LP) / 2010: (re-edition LP)
- 1995: A Chapter of Accidents (CD) / 2011: (LP)
- 2004: Brain Corrosion (CD) / 2006: (LP)

=== 7" EPs ===
- 1994: Party's Over (Split with Blood)
- 1998: No Pate, No Mind (Split with Malignant Tumour)
- 1998: Poppy-Seed Cake (Split with Clotted Symmetric Sexual Organ)
- 2009: Heartburn Result (Split with Regurgitate)
- 2009: Furniture Obsession (Split with Haemorrhage)
- 2014: Looking For Victims (Split with Parricide)

=== Other releases ===
- 1991: World Full of Remains (Demo) / 2006: (LP edition)
- 1992: Start Human Slaughter (Demo) / 2006: (LP edition)
- 1997: Human Slaughter.. till Remains (CD compilation of demos)
- 1998: The Greatest Shits (Tribute MCD)
- 2008: Corpses of The Universe (MCD) / 2009: (LP)
- 2008: Dead Singles Collection (CD compilation of 7-inch EPs)
