= Murder in Mind (album) =

Murder In Mind

Studio album by Desecration
- Released: 1998
- Studio: Phila Studios
- Genre: Death metal Black metal
- Label: Copro Records
- Producer: Desecration

Desecration chronology
Gore and Perversion (1995)	Murder In Mind (1998)	Stillborn Climax (1998)

Murder in Mind is the second album (though first not to be banned) by death metal band Desecration.

== Track listing ==
1. "Intro"
2. "Murder in Mind"
3. "Impaled"
4. "Cerebral Annoxia"
5. "Stillborn Climax"
6. "Beyond Recognition"
7. "Bathroom Autopsy"
8. "Victimised"
9. "Incestual Sodomy"
10. "Obscene Publication"
11. "Crave for Rot"

Written by:

- Paul Arlett
- Glenn Thomas
- Jason Jad Davies
- John Young
