= Gut (band) =

German grindcore band

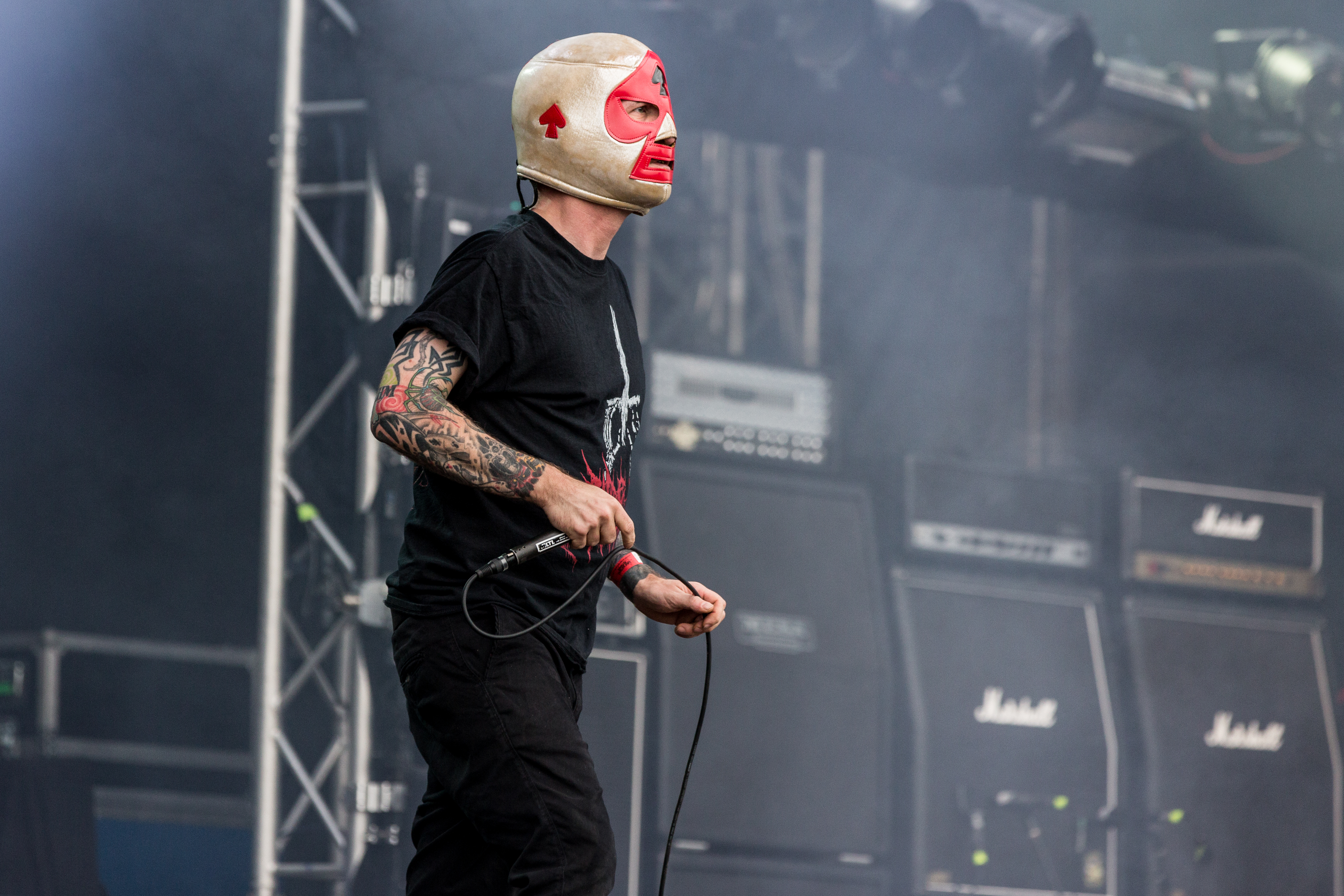
- Vocalist Oliver Roder performing in 2017

Background information
- Origin: Stuttgart, Germany
- Genres: Grindcore, pornogrind
- Years active: 1991-1995, 1999, 2004-present
- Labels: Regurgitated Semen, Malodorous Mangled Innards, Necroharmomic, Splatter Zombie
- Members: Joachim Pröll; Oliver Roder; Andreas Rigo; Alexander Wenz
- Website: www.gut-grindcore.de

Gut is a German grindcore band, often credited as the "fathers of pornogrind". The group was founded in 1991 and is known for their over-the-top vocals and morbid, pornographic imagery. The band is also noted for its members performing in masked outfits, which became something of a staple in the pornogrind genre thereafter.

After two separate breakups in the 1990's, Gut returned in 2004 and released The Cumback 2006, which combines grindcore with hip hop, hardcore punk, and electronic music. In 2020, after a long period of inactivity, Gut returned once again with a third album Disciples of Smut, released on Splatter Zombie Records.

== Band members ==
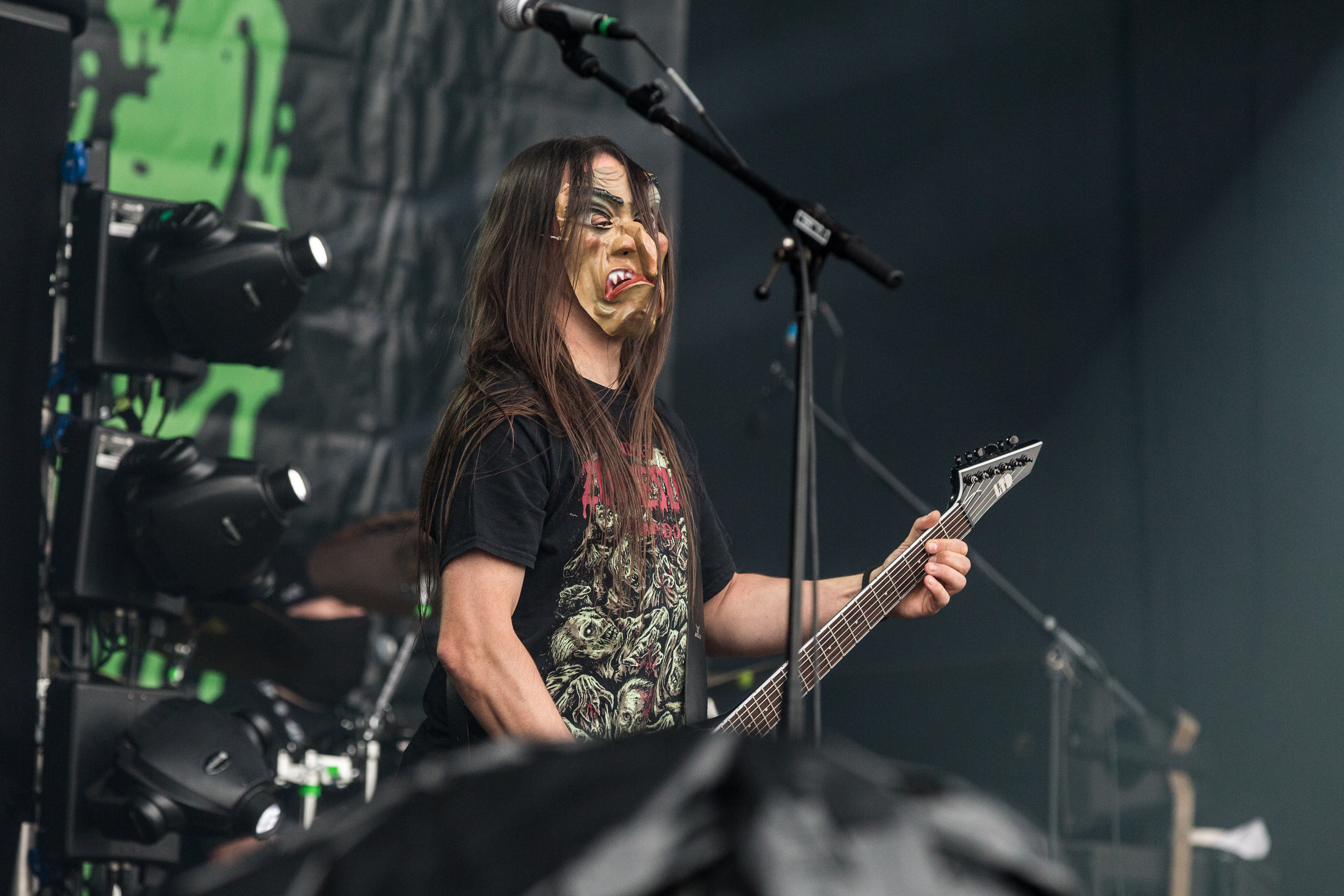
Guitarist Joachim Pröll in 2017

=== Current members ===
- Joachim Pröll – guitar (1991–1995, 1999, 2004–present)
- Oliver Roder – vocals (1991–1995, 1999, 2004–present)
- Andreas Rigo – bass (1994–1995, 1999, 2004–2005, 2007–present)
- Alexander Wenz – drums (2025–present)

=== Past members ===
- Tim Eiermann – drums, vocals, additional guitar (1991–1995, 1999, 2004–2025)
- Michael Beckett – bass (1991–1994)
- Markus Zorn – bass (2005–2007)

== Discography ==
=== Albums ===
- Odour of Torture (Regurgitated Semen, 1995)
- The Cumback (Necroharmonic/Obliteration, 2006)
- Disciples of Smut (Splatter Zombie, 2020)

=== Other releases ===
- Drowned in Female Excrements (demo, 1991)
- Spermany's Most Wanted 7-inch (Malodrous Mangled Innards, 1992)
- Gefotzt Gefistelt promo live cassette (Macabre, 1994)
- Hyper-Intestinal Vulva Desecration 7-inch (Necroharmonic, 1994)
- Assyfied/Pussyfied 7-inch (Malodorous Mangled Innards, 1995)
- The Singles Collection (compilation album, Deliria Noise Outfitters / Decomposed Sounds, 2000)
- Pimps of Gore 7-inch (collaborative album with Otto von Schirach - Supreme Chaos, 2006)

=== Splits ===
- Cripple Bitch split 7-inch with Retaliation (Regugitated Semen, 1994)
- Split 7-inch EP with Morphea (Mobid Single, 1994)
- Twat Enema split 7-inch with Gore Beyond Necropsy (Malodorous Mangled Innards, 1994)
- Fistful of Sperm split 7-inch with Brain Damage (Regurgitated Semen, 1994)
- Enter the Painroom split 7-inch with Dead (Gulli, 1995)
- Girls on Acid split 7-inch with Rompeprop (Everydayhate, ?)
- Want Some Nuke or Gut? split cassette with Nuke (Macabre, 1995)
- Hooker Ballett split EP with Gonorrhea Pussy (Last House on the Right, 2006)
- Gigolo Warfare split EP with Distorted Impalement (Morbid, 2007)
- The Green Slime Are Coming split EP with Satan's Revenge On Mankind (Rotten Roll Rex, 2010)
