= Gore and Perversion =

Studio album by Desecration
- Released: 1995
- Genre: Death metal; black metal
- Label: Arctic Serenades
- Producer: Desecration

Desecration chronology
Mangled Remains (1993)	Gore and Perversion (1995)	Murder in Mind (1998)

Gore and PerVersion 2
- Cover of 2003 reissue

Gore and Perversion is the first album by death metal band Desecration, released in its original version on Arctic Serenades in 1995. The album, along with all of the band's instruments and recording equipment, were seized and incinerated by the Gwent Constabulary due to the album's offensive content and what was deemed to be its obscene nature, and it was banned. The ensuing court case and media furore established the name Desecration in the South Wales scene and beyond.

The album was subsequently re-recorded in 2001 and re-released in 2003 as Gore and PerVersion 2. It was re-pressed as a white disc edition. The first fifty copies were signed and numbered by Ollie Jones and Michael Hourihan and were only available from the band.

The band was told to tone down the lyrics or forget about the music business. This did not happen however, and after three years of fine-tuning their style, Desecration recorded the album Murder in Mind.

== Track listing ==
- All songs written by Ollie Jones, Paul Arlett, Glenn Thomas and Jason "Jad" Davies
1. "Raping the Corpse"
2. "Human Gore"
3. "Penile Dissection"
4. "It Can't Be My Grave"
5. "Dead Bitch in the Skip"
6. "No More Room in the Freezer"
7. "Mutilated Genitalia"
8. "Immense Suffering"
9. "To Kill With A Drill"
10. "Pharaonic Circumcision"
11. "Coprophilliac Connoisseur"
12. "Fontanelle Fornication"
13. "I.A.I" *Censored Title
