= Out of Focus (band) =

- Origin: Germany
- Genres: Krautrock
- Years active: Late 1960s and 1970s

Out of Focus was a German Krautrock rock fusion band, formed in late-1968 in Munich, with Hennes Herring on keyboards (mainly the Hammond organ), Remigius Drechsler on guitars, Hans-Georg "Moran" Neumüller on vocals and winds, Klaus Spöri on drums and Stefan Wisheu on bass.

Out of Focus took their name from a Blue Cheer track, but had also been influenced by Soft Machine and Xhol Caravan, and rapidly established a distinctive style blending rock, jazz and psychedelic overtones. The band's music was known for the socio-political commentary present in Moran Neumüller's songs. Although typically Munich styled (with Embryo and Sahara connections) they are often compared to Canterbury fusion and Scandinavian jazz-rock acts. After Out of Focus split up, bandleader Remigius Drechsler joined Embryo in the fall of 1979 for about one year before establishing his own project, Kontrast.

== Discography ==
- Wake Up (1971)
- Out of Focus (1971)
- Four Letter Monday Afternoon (1972)
- Not Too Late (1999 (recorded in 1974))
- Rat Roads (2002 (recorded in 1972))
- Palermo (2008 (recorded in 1972))
