= Haemorrhage (band) =

Spanish goregrind band

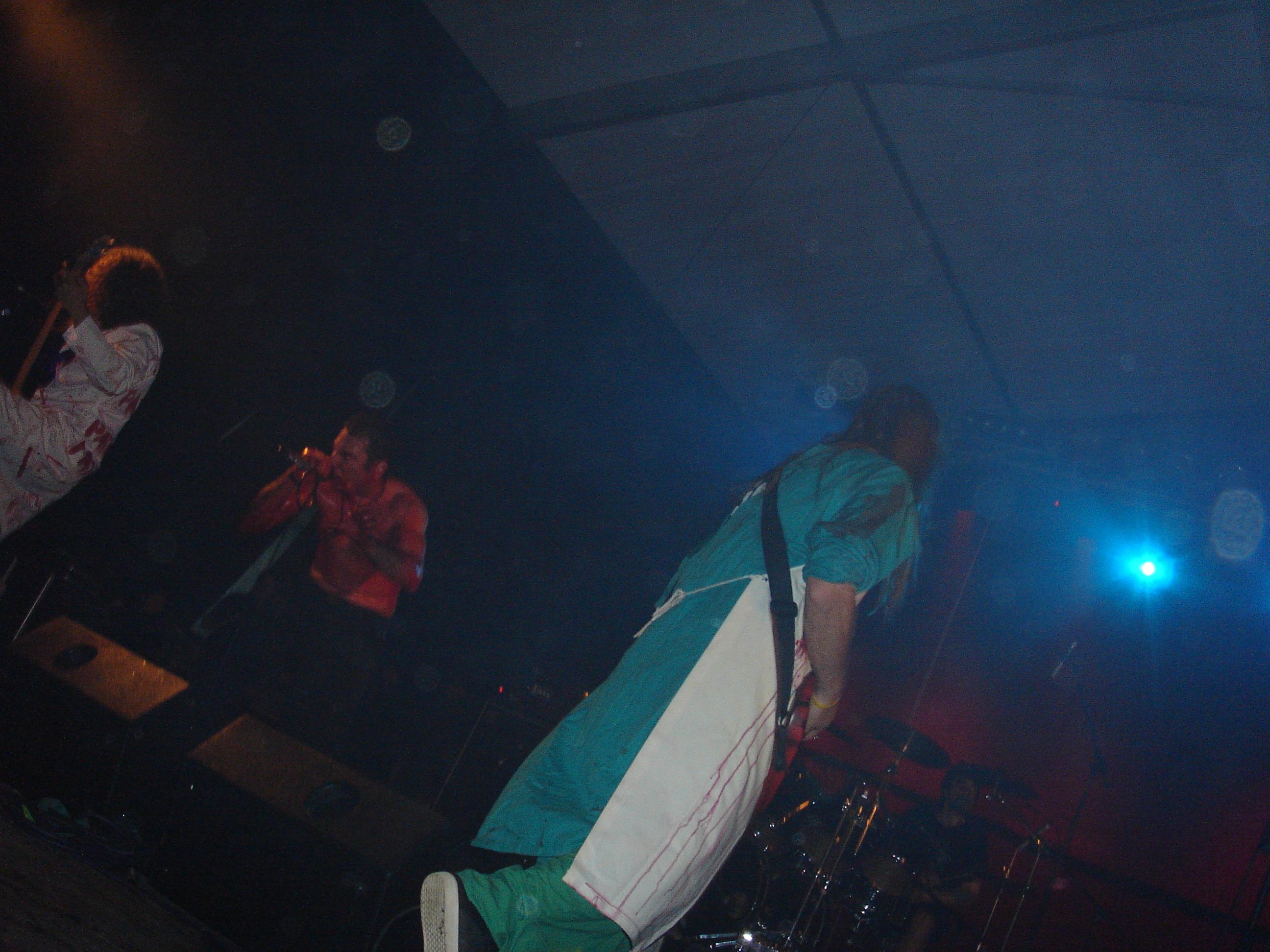
- Haemorrhage (2010)

Background information
- Also known as: Devourment (1990-1991)
- Origin: Madrid, Spain
- Genres: Goregrind, deathgrind
- Years active: 1991–present
- Labels: Morbid; Relapse
- Members: Luisma; Ramón Checa; Lugubrious; Ana Belen de Lopez; Daviti
- Past members: Jose; Daniel "Rojas" Lopez; David; Erik Raya; Osckar Bravo

Haemorrhage is a Spanish goregrind band from Madrid.

== History ==
The band formed in 1990 as the trio Devourment, with singer-bassist Jose, guitarist Luisma, and drummer Emilio. Emilio left the band in the summer of 1991. The group reformed as a duo, with Luisma playing guitar, Jose moving to drums, and both singing. They released their first demo as Haemorrhage, Grotesque Embryopathology. Near the end of 1993, singer Lugubrious and bassist Ramon joined the band. Between 1994 and 1995, Haemorrhage recorded a seven-song promo tape and sent it to Morbid Records, resulting in a two-album contract. They enlisted guitarist Ana and recorded their first release, Emetic Cult. Jose left in the following year due to personal issues and Rojas replaced him. After five studio albums on Morbid Records, the band signed to Relapse Records and released the albums Hospital Carnage and We are the Gore.

== Musical style and influences ==
Haemorrhage are, like many goregrind bands, heavily influenced by Carcass. Live shows typically feature band members sporting surgeon's outfits and vocalist Lugubrious covered in blood, which is common in the goregrind scene. Artwork is almost exclusively done by guitarist Luisma.

The band's lyrics are known for their gross-out effect. New Noise Magazine described the band's lyrics as "testing the strength of their fans' stomachs".

== Members ==
=== Current members ===
- Luisma - lead guitar (1991–present)
- Lugubrious - lead vocals (1993–present)
- Ana Belen de Lopez - rhythm guitar (1994–present)
- Ramón Checa - bass (1994–present)
- Daviti - drums (2023–present)

=== Former members ===
- Jose - drums (1991–1996, 2011–2014)
- Daniel "Rojas" López - drums (1996–2011)
- David - drums (2014–2016)
- Erik Raya - drums (2016–2019)
- Osckar Bravo - drums (2019–2023)

== Discography ==
=== Studio albums ===
- Emetic Cult (1995)
- Grume (1997)
- Anatomical Inferno (1998)
- Morgue Sweet Home (2002)
- Apology for Pathology (2006)
- Hospital Carnage (2011)
- We Are the Gore (2017)

=== Demos, singles and EPs ===
- Grotesque Embryopathology Demo (1992)
- Obnoxious Split with Christ Denied (1994)
- Split with Exhumed (1995)
- Split with Damnable (1996)
- Grind Over Europe ’96 Split with Clotted Symmetric Sexual Organ/Dead Infection (1996)
- The Cadaverous Carnival Split with Denak (1998)
- Surgery for the Dead Split with Groinchurn (1998)
- Split with Ingrowing (1999)
- Rotten to the Gore Split with Embolism/Suffocate/Obliterate (2000)
- Scalpel, Scissors, and Other Forensic Instruments (2000)
- Loathesongs (2000)
- Do You Still Believe in Hell? Split with Gonkulator (2001)
- Dawn in the Rotting Czech Split with Mastic Scum (2001)
- Live in the Morgue Split with Depression (2001)
- Split with WTN (2002)
- Dementia Rex split with Impaled (2003)
- Live to Dissect Split with Terrorism (2004)
- Feasting on Purulence Split with Nunslaughter (2005)
- Furtive Dissection split with Embalming Theatre (2006)
- Chainsaw Necrotomy split with Dead (2008)
- In Gore we trust split with Dead Infection (2009)
- Morgue Metal split with Disgorge (2011)
- Hospital Thieves" split with Gruesome Stuff Relish (2011)
- Punk Carnage EP (2012)
- Feasting on Maryland (2013)
- Obnoxious EP (2014)
- To Serve - To Protect... To Kill - To Dissect / Great Grinds Drink Alike Split with Rompeprop (2016)
- Fallen In Gore Split with Hemdale and Meat Spreader (2018)
