= Agathocles (band) =

Belgian grindcore band

- logo

Background information
- Origin: Geel, Antwerp, Belgium
- Genres: Grindcore
- Years active: 1985–present
- Label: Displeased
- Members: Jan Frederickx; Nils Laureys; Koen De Neve

Agathocles is a Belgian political grindcore band. Founded in 1985, it is mainly known for producing a large quantity of split seven-inch EPs. They play a style of grindcore they have dubbed "mincecore". Their lyrical themes have focused on anti-fascism, animal liberation and anarchism. All of its members are vegetarians.

Their lineup has changed numerous times since they first started, the only consistent member being Jan Frederickx (also known as Jan AG).

== Biography ==
=== 1980s ===
Agathocles was formed in the Belgian city of Mol, aspiring to sound like bands such as Lärm and Hellhammer. Its original members, Jan and Erwin, were involved in the underground metal/punk scene since the start of the decade, releasing compilation tapes and zines. Only a few of their rehearsal tapes survive from 1984, their first year playing together, mainly as appearances on compilations.

Agathocles began playing concerts in 1985, although audiences were still small for the type of extreme music they produced. They had an on-air interview on the local radio station that year.

By 1987, the band's line-up had begun to settle, albeit temporarily, in the form of Jan, Ronny and Erwin. They also found a long-term rehearsal space—Jam, a youth club in Mol—where they would not receive complaints or be ejected, as had happened in previous rehearsal rooms. They recorded more compilation tracks, organised more small concerts, and played gigs with other bands who would become equally famous, such as Napalm Death and Pestilence (and later Extreme Noise Terror, as well as smaller bands such as Violent Mosquitos and Total Mosh Project).

The first Agathocles releases were issued in 1988, which saw the arrival of a split EP with Riek Boois, as well as their first solo outing, Cabbalic Gnosticism, both of which were originally on cassette. Other material was recorded at the same time, but not released until later. By this time the band had four members, as Jakke had joined on guitar in December 1986, allowing Jan to concentrate on vocals.

Another guitarist, Guy, joined a year later, in 1989, and the split LP with the band Drudge was recorded and released on Deaf Records, as well as several other EPs. Towards the end of the year, the line-up changed yet again, with the bassist, Ronny, leaving the band and guitarist Jakke taking over from him.

=== 1990s ===
A major line-up change occurred at the beginning of the decade, in May 1990, when Jan got rid of all the other members of the band and found two new members instead - Domingo on guitar and Burt on drums, with Jan now playing bass. Domingo and Burt were both from little-known Belgian grindcore band Necrosis, who recorded only one demo, in 1990. With the new line-up, the band ceased rehearsing in Mol, moving instead to the drummer's home town of Zichem. Several more EPs were released in the same year and, with the band growing in popularity, they played gigs in Denmark as well as Belgium and went on a mini tour with the Japanese grindcore band SxOxB.

More line-up changes occurred throughout the next few years. Ex-Agathocles drummer Erwin briefly returned in 1991, now playing bass guitar. After only a few months with this line-up, Domingo left the band, leaving the band as a three-piece group during the recording of their Agarchy EP in July. However, the band soon had four members again when Domingo was replaced by Chris. It was with this line-up that they recorded Theatric Symbolisation Of Life, but towards the end of the year, Erwin left the band again and Agathocles got a new bassist called Dirk.

In the summer of 1991, Agathocles also went on another tour, this time in East Germany, with vocalist Tuur from fellow Belgian mincecore band Reign Of Terror. Tuur did vocals for this tour because guitarist Chris was unable to tour with the band, so Jan had to take over his guitarist duties.

The band's line-up changed again in May 1992 when guitarist Chris and bassist Dirk left to form their own band. Agathocles found a new guitarist to take over from Chris - Steve (from Belgian grindcore band Intestinal Disease) - and Jan played bass guitar (as well as doing vocals). Two of the band's LPs (Cliché? and Use Your Anger) were recorded with this new line-up and they also played one gig in Italy for the first time in a small town named Macomer (Sardinia).

The band remained a 3-piece group throughout 1993, with the line-up staying consistent as Jan, Burt and Steve. It was with this line-up that Agathocles went on a major European tour, visiting Belgium, the Czech Republic, Slovakia, Germany and the Netherlands, as well as recording several more split EPs. In 1994, the band retained the same line-up, this time touring in Spain (in July of that year), where they recorded the Mince Mongers In Barna EP in the rehearsal room of Spanish mincecore band Violent Headache. The Black Clouds Determinate CD was also recorded in this year.

The line-up stayed the same during the first half of 1995, during which time Agathocles recorded their album Razor Sharp Daggers, as well as featuring on the compilation Metalopolis, which was released by the Belgian radio station Studio Brussel. In the summer, however, the line-up changed again, with Matty replacing Steve on guitar.

This line-up would stay constant through 1996 and for most of 1997, two years in which Agathocles did a lot more touring. This started at the beginning of 1996, when the band visited Turkey, playing alongside the band Radical Noise, and then they toured the Czech Republic with the mincecore band Malignant Tumour. During this tour, the band recorded a video as a benefit for a Czech animal rights group. As well as recording the album Thanks For Your Hostility and several more split EPs, Agathocles also recorded a studio session in 1996 on the radio station Studio Brussel. Another such session was done the year later, this time in the BBC studios in England, where they recorded a Peel Session, in the same way that many other famous grindcore bands have done. 1997 was also the year that the Humarrogance album was recorded (as well as even more split EPs) and the band also toured in Germany with Swedish band Driller Killer. In November, the line-up changed again, when the band returned to being a four-piece, with Vince joining as the bass guitarist.

With this new line-up, the band toured again in Germany with Driller Killer in 1998 before Matty and Vince left the band in June and Dirk rejoined as the guitarist, with Jan playing bass again. This new line-up, of Jan, Burt and Dirk recorded several more split EPs, and toured in the Czech Republic and Slovakia. They also played gigs with other bands in the underground scene such as Unholy Grave, My Minds Mine and Malignant Tumour. The band ended the decade with a line-up that would last for several years into the new millennium.

=== 2000s ===
In 2000, Agathocles released their sixth full-length, To Serve… to Protect, that was distributed through the Italian label Vacation House (later re-released with bonus tracks by the Brazilian labels No Fashion HC and Heavy Metal Rock).

=== Members ===
- Jan Frederickx - guitar, vocals (1985-)
- Nils Laureys - drums, vocals (2007-)
- Koen - guitar (2012-)

=== Past members ===
- Erwin Vandenbergh - drums (1985-1990) bass (1991)
- Ronny - bass (1987-1989)
- Jakke - guitar (1987-1990)
- Guy - guitar (1989-1990)
- Domingo Smets - guitar (1990)
- Burt Beyens - drums (1990-2002)
- Chris - guitar (1991-1992)
- Dirk - bass (1991-1992)
- Steve Houtmeyers - guitar (1992-1995)
- Matty Dupont - guitar (1995-1998)
- Dirk Cuyx - guitar (1998-2007)
- Roel Tulleneers - drums (2002-2007)
- Tony Schepkens - bass (2007-2008)
- Bram Criekemans - bass (2008-2012)

== Discography ==
- Theatric Symbolisation of Life' 1992
- Use Your Anger 1992
- Black Clouds Determinate 1994
- Razor Sharp Daggers 1995
- The LPs: 1989-1991 1996
- Thanks For Your Hostility 1996
- Humarrogance 1997
- Split with Axed Up Conformist 1999
- To Serve... to Protect... 2000
- Superiority Overdose 2001
- 4-Way Split with Abortion, Din-Addict and Malignant Tumour 2001
- Bomb Brussels (Live Album) 2001
- Alive & Mincing (Live Album) 2003
- Mincemania In Bulgaria 2004
- Mincer 2006
- Get Off your Ass/In Noise we Noise Split with Ruido Genital 2007
- Night Train To Terror split with Saul Turteltaub 2007
- Split with The Vanishing Act 2008
- Split with Armatura 2008
- Abstract split with Cü Sujo 2008
- Grind is Protest 2009
- Split with Crowd Control 2009
- "Imaginary Boundaries" 4-way split with Detrua Ideo/Violenta Dizimacao/Pissdeads 2009
- This is Not a Threat, It's a Promise 2010
- 4 way split with Kerenaneko, Prosuck and Rvota 2011
- Kanpai!! 2012
- Agathocles/Nauseate - Split CD 2014
- Commence to Mince 2016
- We Just Don't Fit 2018
- Baltimore Mince Massacre 2020

=== LPs ===
- Supposed It Was You (split with Drudge) 1989
- Split with Lunatic Invasion 1991
- Theatric Symbolisation Of Life 1992
- Agarchy / Use Your Anger 1997
- Split with Deadmocracy 1998
- Until It Bleeds (Best Of) 1997
- Live and Noisy (Live) 1997
- Mincecore (Compilation) 1998
- To Serve... To Protect 1999
- Live in Leipzig, Germany 1991 (Live) 1999
- Mincecore History 1985-1990 (Compilation) 2000
- Keep Mincing (Compilation) 2001
- Superiority Overdose 2001
- Mincecore History 1989-1993 (Best of) 2001
- Chop Off Their Trust (Split) 2002
- Live Aalst Belgium 1989 (Split) 2002
- Until It Bleeds Again (1994-1999) (Best of) 2002
- Split With Sterbe Hilfe - Emoc T'now Modcnik Yht! (Split Album) 2003
- To Serve... To Protect / Leads To... (Best of) 2003

=== EPs ===
- If This Is Gore, What's Meat Then (split with Riek Boois) 1988
- Split with Disgorge 1989
- Split with V.N.A. 1989
- Fascination of Mutilation 1989
- If This Is Cruel What's Vivisection Then? 1989
- Who Profits? Who Dies? (split with Morbid Organs Mutilation (M.O.M.)) 1989
- Split with Blood - wrong band linked 1990
- Split with Smegma 1991
- Split with Putrid Offal 1991
- Split with Psycho 1991
- Agarchy 1991
- Cliché? 1992
- Split with Social Genocide 1993
- Blind World (split with Nasum) 1993
- Split with Starvation 1993
- War Scars (split with Kompost) 1993
- Distrust And Abuse 1993
- Split with Nyctophobic 1993
- Split with Bad Acid Trip 1993
- No Use ...For Hatred 1993
- Split with Patareni 1993
- Split with Smash The Brain 1993
- Split with Man Is The Bastard 1993
- Split with Plastic Grave 1994
- Split with Audiorrea 1994
- Split with Averno 1994
- Split with Punisher 1994
- Mince-Mongers in Barna 1994
- Split with Carcass Grinder 1994
- Split with Rot 1994
- Back To 1987 (Best Of Album) 1994
- Split with Notoken 1995
- Split with Voltifobia 1996
- Split with Vomit Fall 1996
- Split with Preparation H 1996
- Split with Autoritor 1996
- Split with Krush 1996
- Bomb Brussels 1996
- Minced Alive 1996
- Split with Black Army Jacket 1996
- Split with No Gain - Just Pain 1996
- Split with Respect 1997
- Split with Böses Blut 1997
- Split with PP7 Gaftzeb 1997
- Split with Looking For Answer 1997
- Split with Monolith (grindcore) 1997
- Split with Shikabane 1997
- Split with Malignant Tumour 1997
- Split with D.I.E. 1997
- Split with BWF 1997
- Split with Abstain 1997
- Split with Mitten Spider 1997
- Split with Comrades 1998
- Split with Spud 1998
- Split with Bloodsucker 1998
- Split with Depressor 1998
- Split with Hunt Hunters 1999
- Split with Glass Eyes 1999
- Split with Disreantiyouthhellchristbastardassmanx 1999
- Split with Grind Buto 1999
- Split with Piles Left to Rot 2000
- Split with Kontatto 2000
- Split with Din-Addict 2000
- Split with Brutal Headache 2000
- Kicked and Whipped/Keep On Selling Cocaine to Angels 2000
- Split with Disculpa 2000
- Split with Jan AG 2002
- Split with Front Beast 2003
- Split with Sodan Sankareita 2003
- Split EP with The Mad Thrashers 2004
- Split EP with Kadaverficker 2004
- Split with ... Our Last Beer(s) 2004
- Split with dios hastío 2005
- Split with Archagathus 2006
- Split with Seven Minutes of Nausea 2007
- Split with J. Briglia, L. Butler, D. Schoonmaker & J. Williams 2008
- Split with SMG 2008
- Split with Armatura 2008
- Split with Crowd Control 2008
- Split with I Hope You Suffer 2008
- Split with Repulsione 2008
- Split with Disleksick 2009
- Split with ShitFuckingShit and GAP
- Split with Jandek (collaboration)
- Split with Sposa In Alto Mare (7 inches) 2011
- Split with Kurws (5 inches) 2013
- Split with Necrology 2015
- Split EP with G.I. Joke 2015
- Split with GodCum 2018
- Split with LtxDan 2017
- Split with Antikult 2019
- Split with Terminal Filth Wimpcore Killer (7 inch) 2021
- Stabilithocles (split with Стабильность) 2022
- Split with Ulrikes Dream 2025

Despite an extensive discography, Agathocles have no official presence on digital platforms such as Bandcamp or Spotify. The band does not use digital media, and any material appearing on such platforms is not officially released.

=== DTs ===
- Cabbalic Gnosticism 1988
- Live In Gierle 1989

=== DVDs ===
- Superiority Overdose 2002
