= Pornogrind =

Subgenre of grindcore

- Other names: Porngrind, pornogore
- Stylistic origins: Grindcore; death n roll; goregrind; porno groove
- Cultural origins: Early 1990s Germany and U.S.
- Typical instruments: Guitar; bass guitar; drums; drum machine; vocals

Other topics
- Cock rock; porn rap; dirty blues

Pornogrind (also known as porngrind or pornogore) is a musical microgenre offshoot of goregrind that lyrically deals with pornographic themes.

== Characteristics ==
The genre is related and similar to goregrind but does bear distinguishing features. Besides the eponymous emphasis on graphic sexual themes in lyrics and album artwork, which "would keep [these records] out of most stores", from a technical perspective pornogrind songs are often simpler, slower, and more rock-like than other grind genres.

Zero Tolerance described pornogrind as "the most downright perverted of the lot, often adding a dollop of filthy groove and vocals straight from the toilet." Natalie Purcell, however, in her book Death Metal Music: The Passion and Politics of a Subculture, suggests that pornogrind is defined solely on the basis of its lyrical content and unique imagery, its focus on pornographic content. Rolling Stone has said that it is "basically just grindcore, but with an over-the-top, juvenile obsession with sex, violence and the ways the two could combine on a woman’s body. Think samples from porno movies, lyrics about sexual violence and gross-out album art."

Notable bands of the genre include Gut and Cock and Ball Torture. Grindcore and death metal bands such as Meat Shits and Pungent Stench would feature themes centered around pornography, sexuality, abuse, and sadomasochism, and would oppose the typical themes of gore and violence of goregrind and death metal. Both bands are considered influential to the genre.

== Controversy ==
The genre saw some limited mainstream media controversy after the 2019 Dayton shooting as the perpetrator, Connor Betts, performed live vocals in the pornogrind group Menstrual Munchies on multiple occasions. After the attack, artists and fans of the genre were outraged after outlets such as Vice attempted to link pornogrind's obscene themes to violent crime. While pornogrind artists made it very clear that they do not approve of real life crimes or Betts' actions, there were nevertheless a handful of pornogrind musicians who deleted their social media profiles, put their band's tour plans on hiatus or outright quit the genre after the attack occurred.

== See also ==
- Goregrind
- Grindcore
