= Maryland Deathfest =

Annual American extreme music festival

- Genre: Heavy metal, death metal, doom metal, thrash metal, black metal, grindcore, experimental, hardcore punk, stoner metal, progressive metal
- Dates: 21–24 May 2026
- Locations: Baltimore, Maryland, United States
- Years active: 2003–2019; 2022; 2024-present
- Founded: 2003
- Founders: Ryan Taylor & Evan Harting
- Website: www.deathfests.com

Maryland Deathfest (often abbreviated to MDF) is an annual American extreme metal music festival founded in 2003 by Ryan Taylor and Evan Harting. The festival is held in Baltimore, Maryland during Memorial Day weekend, and it features many bands from around the world that vary from a wide range of heavy metal subgenres. It is the biggest event of its kind in North America, attracting attendees from more than 40 U.S. states and 30 countries every year. More than 800 bands from more than 40 countries have played at MDF since 2003.

The concept of the event is "To bring to the world the best and most extreme bands the underground has to offer. Never conforming to trends, or being limited by genre restrictions, we want to showcase what extreme music, both new and old, is capable of."

Due to the COVID-19 pandemic, MDF was cancelled in 2020 and 2021, but returned on May 26–29, 2022.

Shortly before the 2022 festival, the organizers of MDF stated that the event would not happen in 2023. On August 2, 2022, it was announced that MDF will return for its 19th edition on May 23–26, 2024.

== History and line-ups ==
Since 2003, MDF has featured over 750 bands from over 35 countries, many of which have made their US debut at the festival. The festival is promoted with the slogan: "America's biggest metal party of the year."

=== 2003 ===
The first installment of Maryland Deathfest was held from Friday, May 23 to Sunday, May 25 at the Thunderdome.

Lineup
Friday	Saturday	Sunday
Devourment; Aborted; Internal Bleeding; Malignancy; Circle of Dead Children; Brodequin; Incinerate; Saprogenic; Nemo; Severed Head; Scumbitch	Suffocation; Dying Fetus; Pyrexia; Skinless; Leng Tch'e; Severed Savior; Mortal Decay; Foetopsy; Drogheda; Suture; Putrid Pile; Psychotogen; Lust of Decay; Rupture Christ; Spinefed	Sublime Cadaveric Decomposition; Necrophagist; Soils of Fate; Abuse; Commit Suicide; Malamor; Retch; Wasteform; Gored; Goratory; Artery Eruption

=== 2004 ===
Maryland Death Fest 2004 was held on Saturday, May 29 and Sunday, May 30 at the Thunderdome.

Lineup
Saturday	Sunday
Swarm of the Lotus; Fleshtized; Internal Suffering; Neuraxis; Brodequin; Bile; Malignancy; Ion Dissonance; Profanity; Pig Destroyer; Leng Tch'e; Phobia; Rotten Sound; Repulsion	Bodies in the Gears of the Apparatus; Biolich; Circle of Dead Children; Man Must Die; Arsis; Mortal Decay; Dehumanized; Misery Index; Rompeprop; Vomit Remnants; The Red Chord; Macabre; Inhume; Exhumed

=== 2005 ===
Maryland Deathfest 2005 was held on Saturday, May 28 and Sunday, May 29 at the House of Rock.

Lineup
Saturday	Sunday
Screaming Afterbirth; Prophecy; Guttural Secrete; Kill the Client; Warscars; Lord Gore; Misery Index; Pig Destroyer; Leng Tch'e; Wormed; Gronibard; Abscess; Regurgitate; Cryptopsy	Amoebic Dysentery; Magrudergrind; Despised Icon; XXX Maniak; Splatterhouse; Ion Dissonance; Bodies Lay Broken; Ghoul; Rotten Sound; Birdflesh; Aborted; Impaled; General Surgery; Immolation

=== 2006 ===
Maryland Deathfest IV was held on Saturday, May 27 and Sunday, May 28. This was the first Maryland Deathfest to be held at Sonar, which hosted every iteration of the festival from 2006 to 2012.

Lineup
Saturday	Sunday
Embryonic Cryptopathia; Electro Quarterstaff; Cenotaph; Catheter; Yacøpsæ; Cliteater; Sanitys Dawn; Gorgasm; Skinless; Alarum; Butcher ABC; Anata; Machetazo; Demilich; Haemorrhage; Vital Remains	Quills; Magrudergrind; Total Fucking Destruction; Mucupurulent; Municipal Waste; Embalmer; Sayyadina; Rompeprop; Disfear; Severe Torture; Unholy Grave; Cattle Decapitation; Necrophagist; Pungent Stench; Dismember

=== 2007 ===
Maryland Deathfest V was held on Saturday, May 26 and Sunday, May 27.

Lineup
Saturday	Sunday
Saprogenic; Foetopsy; Flagitious Idiosyncrasy in the Dilapidation; Nunwhore Commando 666; Gorod; Skitsystem; Cock and Ball Torture; Rotten Sound; Gorerotted; General Surgery; Regurgitate; Vomitory; Extreme Noise Terror; Brutal Truth	Putrescence; Exhale; Fuck the Facts; Jigsore Terror; Odious Mortem; Retaliation; Misery Index; Ghoul; Birdflesh; Cripple Bastards; GUT; Dead Infection; Malevolent Creation; Zyklon

=== 2008 ===
Maryland Deathfest VI was held from Friday, May 23 to Sunday, May 25.

Lineup
Friday	Saturday	Sunday
Skarp; Afgrund; Torsofuck; Ingrowing; The Day Everything Became Nothing; Phobia; Squash Bowels; Martyr; Grave	Decrypt; Defeatist; Trap Them; Keitzer; Kalibas; Waco Jesus; Behold...The Arctopus; Defeated Sanity; Flesh Parade; Disfear; Coffins; Fuck...I'm Dead; Ghoul; Monstrosity; Anaal Nathrakh	Copremesis; Infected Malignity; Japanische Kampfhörspiele; Engorged; Gruesome Stuff Relish; Hellnation; Circle Of Dead Children; Gadget; Dead; Impaled; Dying Fetus; Macabre; Blood Duster; Nuclear Assault

=== 2009 ===
Maryland Deathfest VII was held from Friday, May 22 to Sunday, May 24, and was the first incarnation of the festival to feature a second stage outside the venue.

Main Room Stage
Friday	Saturday	Sunday
Hero Destroyed; Triac; Jig-Ai; Sayyadina; Gnostic; Pigsty; Withered; Venomous Concept; Victims	Drugs of Faith; Maruta; Pretty Little Flower; Unearthly Trance; Crowpath; Flesh Parade; Weekend Nachos; Rotten Sound; Misery Index; Birdflesh; Pig Destroyer; Phobia; General Surgery; Wolves in the Throne Room	Complete Failure; Agenda of Swine; The Endless Blockade; Lair of the Minotaur; Magrudergrind; Kill the Client; Splitter; Despise You; Yakuza; Catheter; Krallice; Antigama; Trap Them; Bolt Thrower; Devourment; Sigh

Outside Stage
Friday	Saturday	Sunday
Cattle Decapitation; Cephalic Carnage; Mayhem; Asphyx	Hail of Bullets; Brutal Truth; Immolation; Atheist; Napalm Death; Bolt Thrower	The Red Chord; Absu; Abscess; Aura Noir; Deströyer 666

=== 2010 ===
Maryland Deathfest VIII was held from Friday, May 28 to Sunday, May 30, with a pre-fest show taking place on Thursday, May 27.

Main Room Stage
Thursday (Pre-Fest)	Friday	Saturday	Sunday
Ex-Dementia; XBRAINIAX; Swarm of the Lotus; Nekromantheon; PLF; Iron Lung; Birdflesh; General Surgery	The Communion; Putrescence; Defeatist; Tombs; Jesus Crost; Birds of Prey; Trap Them; Watain; Gride; Coffins; D.R.I.	Howl; Sulaco; Fuck the Facts; Ingrowing; Obliteration; Jucifer; Impaled; Blood Duster; Verbal Abuse; Deceased; Wolfbrigade; Portal	Honkey Kong; Rottenness; Surroundings; Massgrave; Rompeprop; Crucifist; Gridlink; Black Breath; Captain Cleanoff; Magrudergrind; Capitalist Casualties; From Ashes Rise; Converge

Outside Stages
Friday	Saturday	Sunday
Nazxul; Malignancy; Gorguts	Fang; Total Fucking Destruction; The Chasm; Sadistic Intent/Possessed; Incantation; Melechesh; Asphyx; Repulsion; Autopsy	Krallice; Gorod; Sinister; Necrophobic; Eyehategod; Pestilence; Nirvana 2002; Pentagram; Entombed; Obituary

=== 2011 ===
Maryland Deathfest IX was held from Thursday, May 26 to Sunday, May 29, 2011.

Main Room Stage
Thursday	Friday	Saturday	Sunday
Cathedral; Tragedy; Buzzov•en; Extortion; Flesh Parade; Lack of Interest; Miasmal; Noisear; Shitstorm; Witchaven	Marduk; Exhumed; Kylesa; Cripple Bastards; Machetazo; Pulling Teeth; Nails; The Impalers	Inquisition; Hooded Menace; Acid Witch; Defeated Sanity; Doom; Dropdead; Blood Freak; The Kill; Cretin; Mammoth Grinder; Creative Waste; Innumerable Forms; Masakari	Ghost; Last Days of Humanity; Wormed; Doubled Over; Bastard Noise; Skinless; Repugnant; Dead Congregation; Bad Acid Trip; Nightbringer; Oak; Visceral Disgorge

Outside Stages
Friday	Saturday	Sunday
Neurosis; Corrosion of Conformity; Aura Noir; Funebrarum; Nocturnal	Voivod; Exhorder; Impaled Nazarene; Hail of Bullets; In Solitude; Nunslaughter; Cianide; Avulsed	Coroner; Nuclear Assault; Citizens Arrest; Orange Goblin; Malignant Tumour; Nokturnel; Gravehill

=== 2012 ===
Maryland Deathfest X was held from Thursday, May 24 to Sunday, May 27, 2012.

Main Room Stage
Thursday	Friday	Saturday	Sunday
Autopsy; Agalloch; Eyehategod; Absu; Dying Fetus; Rorschach; Needful Things; Die Pigeon Die; Extermination Angel	Nasum; Setherial; Unsane; Negură Bunget; Today Is the Day; Ghoul; Nashgul; Castevet	Winter; Haemorrhage; Tsjuder; Noothgrush; Horna; Archgoat; The Devil's Blood; Black Witchery; Dragged into Sunlight; Looking For an Answer; Bloody Phoenix; Infernal Stronghold	Mortuary Drape; Bethlehem; Sargeist; Nausea; Yob; Ulcerate; Rwake; Cough; Agents of Abhorrence; Coke Bust; Backslider

Outside Stages
Friday	Saturday	Sunday
Godflesh; Napalm Death; Artillery; Macabre; Demigod	Morbid Angel; Brujeria; Confessor; Anvil; Deviated Instinct; Morbid Saint; October 31; Hellbastard	Electric Wizard; Saint Vitus; Suffocation; Pentagram (Chile); Church of Misery; Morgoth; Demonical; Disma

=== 2013 ===
Maryland Deathfest XI was held from Thursday, May 23 to Sunday, May 26, 2013. It was the first incarnation to feature the Baltimore Soundstage, a separate venue that catered primarily to grindcore, punk and hardcore acts. It was also the last incarnation of the festival to be hosted at the former Sonar Compound, following its sale and rebranding as the Paparazzi Nightclub.

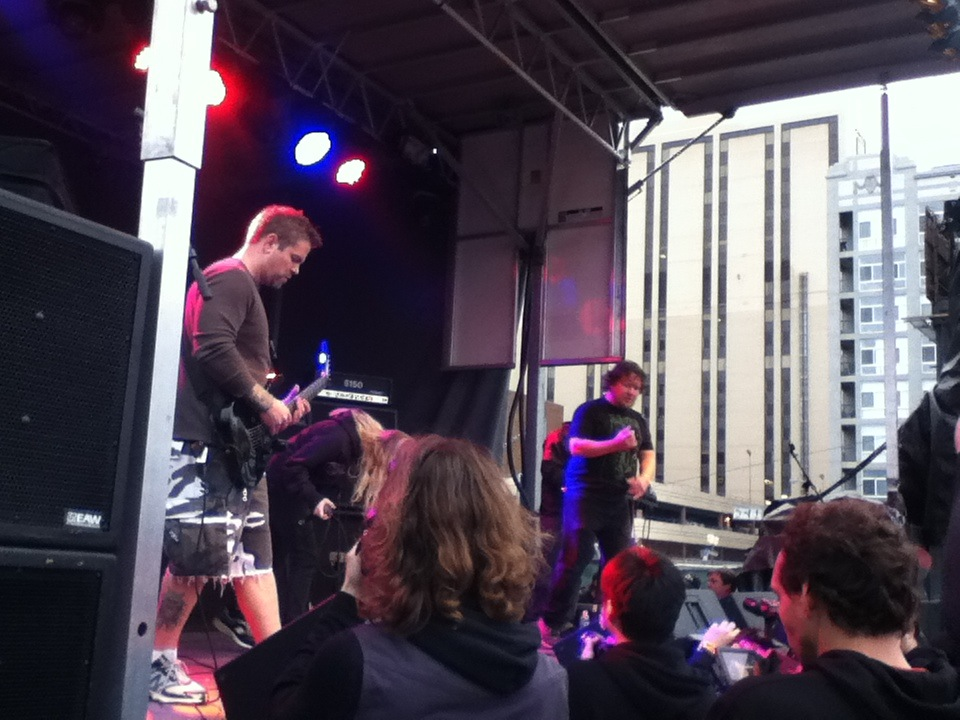
Pig Destroyer performing at Maryland Deathfest 2013

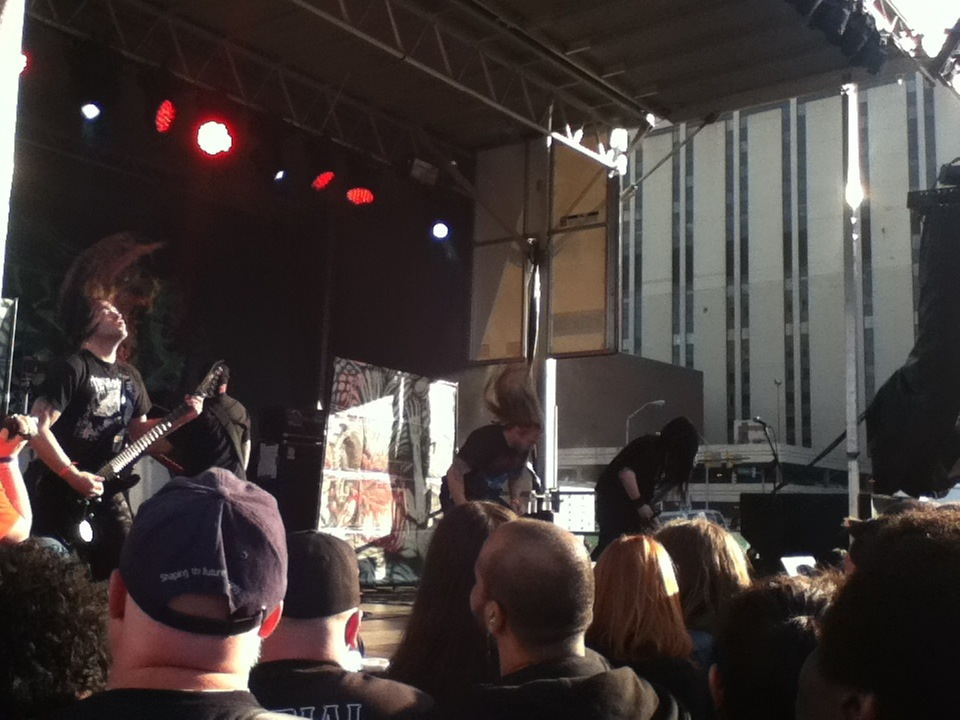
Broken Hope performing.

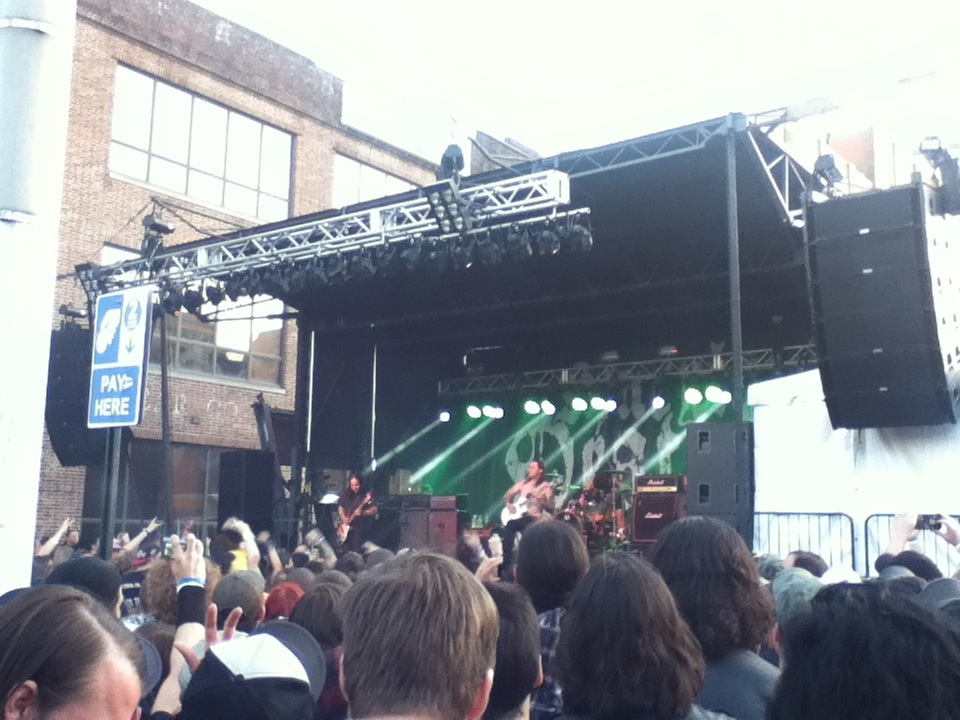
Sleep performing on the main outside stage.

Outdoor Tent
Thursday	Friday	Saturday	Sunday
Bolt Thrower; Cobalt; Abigail; Pallbearer; Deiphago; Noisem	Pelican; Evoken; Ingrowing; Ahumado Granujo; Ambassador Gun	Antaeus; Vinterland; Revenge; Aosoth; Loss; Anhedonist; Kommandant; Asthma Castle	Speedwolf; Ascension; Integrity; Gride; Contrastic; Cruciamentum; Speedwolf

Outside Stages
Friday	Saturday	Sunday
Carcass; Righteous Pigs; Repulsion; Pig Destroyer; Benediction; Convulse	Down; Ihsahn; The Melvins; Broken Hope; The Obsessed; Weedeater; Iniquity	Venom; Pentagram; Sleep; Manilla Road; Sacred Reich; Pagan Altar; Midnight; Glorior Belli

Baltimore Soundstage
Friday	Saturday	Sunday
Tragedy; Rotten Sound; Ringworm; Hellshock; Sete Star Sept; Full of Hell; Heartless; Old Lines	Infest; Terveet Kädet; Vitamin X Weekend Nachos; Massgrav; Eddie Brock; Like Rats; Wake; Disciples of Christ	Converge; Citizen's Arrest; Magrudergrind; Iron Lung; Kromosom; Tinner; Ilsa

=== 2014 ===
Maryland Deathfest XII was held from Thursday, May 22 to Sunday, May 25, 2014. The main stages were located at the Edison Lot in Baltimore, near the former Sonar location. It is the second incarnation to feature the Baltimore Soundstage, again catering primarily to punk, grindcore and hardcore. It is the first year to feature additional bands at Rams Head Live!, which featured mainly black, death and doom metal.

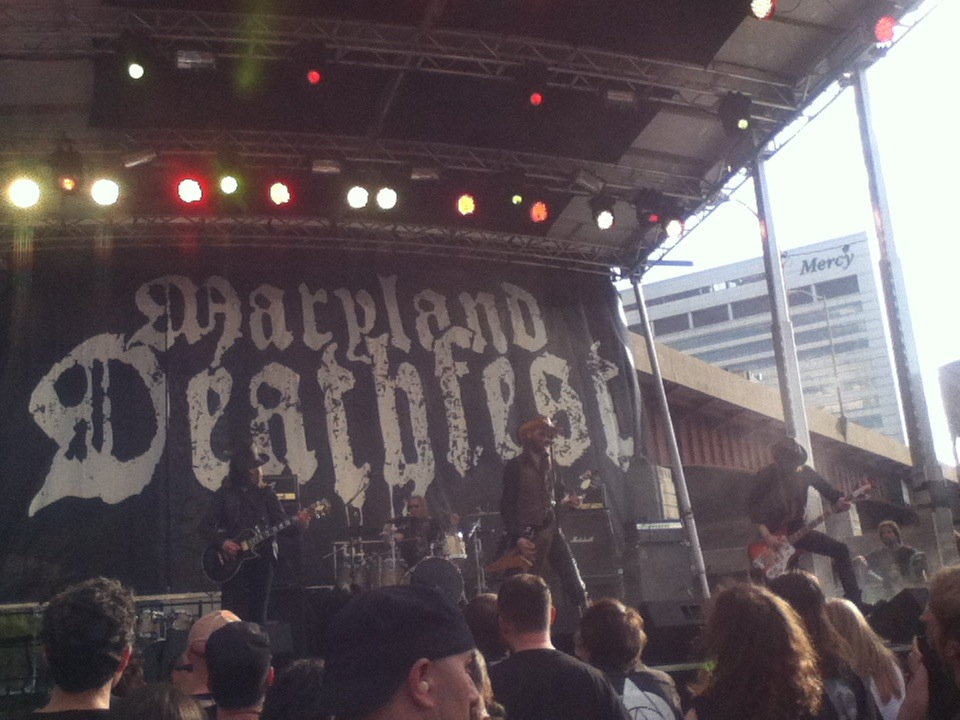
Sólstafir performing on Friday at Edison Lot

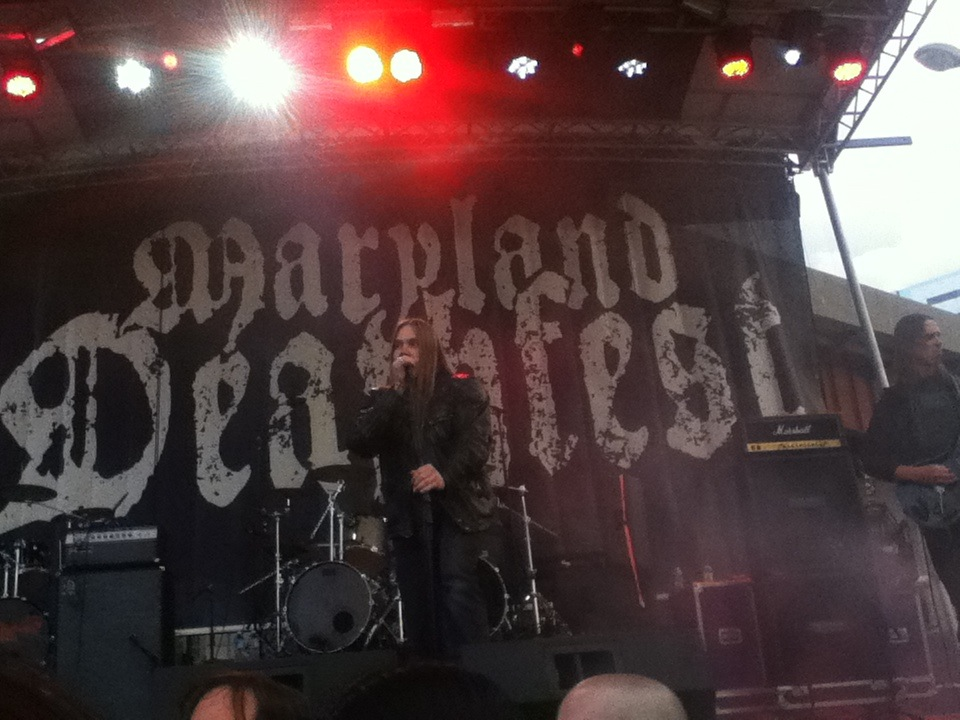
Sarke performing on Saturday at Edison Lot

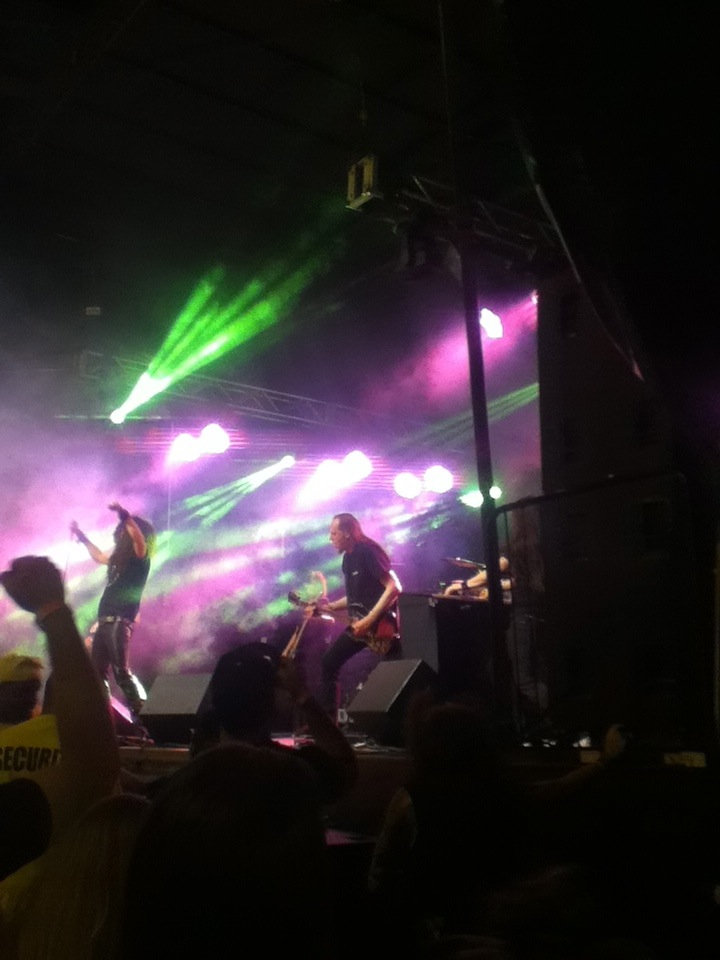
Candlemass performing on Sunday at Edison Lot

Rams Head Live
Thursday	Friday	Saturday	Sunday
Coffins; Crowbar; Seven Sisters of Sleep; Sourvein; Torche; Whitehorse	Aeternus; Enthroned; Incantation; Putrisect	Asphyx; Bolzer; Hooded Menace; The Church Of Pungent Stench; War Master	Immolation; Diocletian; Mutilation Rites; Ulcerate

Edison Lot
Friday	Saturday	Sunday
At the Gates; Cancer; Castevet; Mgła; Necros Christos; Sólstafir; Taake; The Ruins of Beverast; Agalloch	Dark Angel; Diocletian; Entrails; Goat Torment; God Macabre; Machetazo; Nocturnus AD; Orator; Sacrifice; Sarke; Tankard; Unleashed	Bongripper; Candlemass; Gorguts; Graves at Sea; Misery Index; Inquisition; My Dying Bride; Pseudogod; Soilent Green; Uncle Acid and the Deadbeats; Windhand; Wrathprayer

Baltimore Soundstage
Friday	Saturday	Sunday
Impaled; Capitalist Casualties; Creative Waste; Cripple Bastards; Endorphins Lost; Final Conflict; Mesrine; ACxDC; Pneumatic Slaughter; Kill the Client	Archagathus; Birdflesh; Black Breath; Dropdead; Excruciating Terror; Extinction of Mankind; Noothgrush; Sick/Tired; Stapled Shut; Theories; Victims; БУТ	Death Toll 80k Enabler; Internal Rot; Left for Dead; Maruta; Ratos de Porao; Shitstorm; Unholy Grave

=== 2015 ===
Maryland Deathfest XIII was held from Thursday, May 21 to Sunday, May 24, 2015. For the second time, both main stages were located at the Edison Lot in Baltimore, near the former Sonar location. It is the third incarnation to feature the Baltimore Soundstage venue, again catering primarily to punk, grindcore and hardcore, and the second to feature additional bands at Rams Head Live!, again featuring mainly black, death and doom metal. Notably, both Triptykon and Ufomammut were scheduled to appear, after having dropped off of last year's bill. Mobb Deep's performance marked the first appearance of an act outside of heavy metal, hardcore or punk as part of the festival.

Rams Head Live
Thursday	Friday	Saturday	Sunday
Conan; Iron Man; Jex Thoth; Mantar; Primitive Man; Ufomammut; Usnea; YOB	Aeternus; Darkened Nocturn Slaughtercult; Drawn and Quartered; Vattnet Viskar	Adversarial; Demoncy; Gnaw Their Tongues; Tsjuder	Impetuous Ritual; Knelt Rote; Portal; Thantifaxath

Edison Lot
Friday	Saturday	Sunday
Bloodbath; Funebrarum; Lock Up; Suffocation; Vallenfyre; Artificial Brain; Aura Noir; Cianide; Master; Obituary	Blood Red Throne; Bulldozer; Solstice; Razor; Serpentine Path; Twilight of the Gods; Arcturus; Einherjer; Fulgora; Morpheus Descends; Triptykon; Vulcano	Neurosis; Skepticism; Tombs; Winter; Amorphis; Anaal Nathrakh; Demilich; Masacre; Primordial; Prosanctus Inferi

Baltimore Soundstage
Thursday	Friday	Saturday	Sunday
Devourment; Internal Bleeding; Mortal Decay; Origin; Skinless; Mobb Deep	Flagitious Idiosyncrasy in the Dilapidation; Ghoul; Homewrecker; Napalm Death; Nekrofilth; Noisear; Noxa; Splatterhouse; Triac	Agoraphobic Nosebleed; Antigama; Backslider; Cephalic Carnage; Chainsaw to the Face; Engorged; Full of Hell; Inter Arma; Lycanthrophy; Martyrdöd; P.L.F; Wolfbrigade	Coke Bust; Corrupt Leaders; Dirty Rotten Imbeciles; Early Graves; Grin and Bear It; Melt Banana; Mother Brain; Pizzahifive; Spazztic Blurr; Water Torture

=== 2016 ===
Rams Head Live
Thursday	Friday	Saturday	Sunday
The Offering; Crypt Sermon; Buzzov*en; Bongripper; Weedeater; Claudio Simonetti's Goblin; Earth	Demonic Christ; Svarttjern; Secrets of the Moon; Angelcorpse	Auroch; Saturnalia Temple; Grave Miasma; Dragged into Sunlight; Craft	Phobocosm; Mitochondrion; Zhrine; Mystifier

Edison Lot
Friday	Saturday	Sunday
Centinex; Wormed; Gruesome; Paradise Lost; Mayhem; Horrendous; November's Doom; Khold; The Haunted; Samael	Demonical; Deranged; Hirax; Hail of Bullets; Exciter; Testament; Hellbringer; Gruesome; Tulus; Atrophy; Impaled Nazarene; Nuclear Assault	Denouncement Pyre; Nocturnal Graves; Desaster; Interment; Demolition Hammer; Venom; Shed the Skin; Wombbath; Bongzilla; Incantation; Satan

Baltimore Soundstage
Thursday	Friday	Saturday	Sunday
Visceral Disgorge; Waco Jesus; Dehumanized; Putrid Pile; Jungle Rot; Disgorge; Severe Torture	Skullshitter; Ground; Sick of Stupidity; BruceXCampbell; The Afternoon Gentlemen; Hemdale; Yacopsae; Magrudergrind; Rotten Sound; Repulsion	Whoresnation; Priapus; Gets Worse; Malignant Tumour; Severed Head of State; Despise You; General Surgery; Haemorrhage; Infest; Negative Approach; Wormed	Dead Church; Sick Fix; Six Brew Bantha; Sanitys Dawn; Putrescence; Test; Ringworm; Tragedy; Excel; DOOM

== See also ==
- A389 Bash, an extreme metal festival that is also held in Maryland
