= The Destroyers of All =

Studio album by Ulcerate
- Released: January 25, 2011
- Recorded: July–September 2010
- Studio: MCA Studios, Auckland, New Zealand.
- Genre: Technical death metal
- Length: 52:49
- Label: Willowtip Records
- Producer: Ulcerate

Ulcerate chronology
Everything Is Fire (2009)	The Destroyers of All (2011)	Vermis (2013)

Vinyl cover
- 2012 Willowtip Records vinyl cover art

The Destroyers of All is the third studio album by New Zealand technical death metal band Ulcerate. It was released on January 25, 2011 through Willowtip Records to positive reviews by critics. A limited edition gatefold vinyl version was issued on November 7, 2012.

== Musical style and writing ==
Explaining the theme behind the album and the meaning of the title, Jamie Saint Merat explained that the lyrics are a commentary on "where we are currently, that as a species we’re fairly blindly arrogant, and it's lead [sic] to some f***ing catastrophic events and actions that in hindsight could easily have been prevented. We exist outside of nature due to our heightened consciousness and awareness - we’re the first species in the history of the planet to really disrupt the flow of the food-chain, and we’re obviously all starting to feel the impact of that now. So the destroyers of all are ourselves, for better or worse."

In an interview with Teeth of the Divine, he further explained that the central theme of the album is "how human beings as a species have a propensity to destroy. The album progresses to elaborate our destructive habits and the lack of respect we hold for the planet, its inhabitants, and each other." Paul Kelland explained that the track 'The Hollow Idols' refers to "our imagined personification of intention in the universe. They embody all our desires, strip us of reality, and empower a decrepit morality. They instill blind and hollow hope and fracture our posterity.”

== Touring ==
The band toured across Europe in support of the album in February 2012. The band performed in many countries, including France, the United Kingdom, Germany, Italy, and Slovakia. The band also toured North America for the first time in support of the album in May 2012, including a performance at Maryland Deathfest.

== Critical reception ==
Professional ratings
Review scores
Source	Rating
AllMusic	4/5 stars
Blabbermouth	8.5/10 stars
Sputnik Music	(4/5)

The album received positive reviews from critics. Pitchfork's editor Brandon Stosuy named it the third best metal album of 2011, describing it as "a beautiful blizzard of sound that feels chaotic and supremely controlled." It was listed by Decibel as no. 21 on the 40 best albums of 2011, and NPR's Lars Gotrich named it the 8th best metal album of 2011, comparing it to a "a hulking Georges Braque painting come to life." MetalSucks' Vince Neilstein wrote that "The result is a unique brand of death metal that’s creepy, doomy and jarring instead of groovy and energetic. Not that there’s anything wrong with the latter, but the former are what make Ulcerate worthy of your attention; no one else sounds like them, and they’re heavy in a truly new way."

Allmusic's Phil Freeman described Ulcerate's approach as "very adventurous", calling The Destroyers of All "an album fans of progressive, forward-looking metal will find very satisfying indeed" in his review, awarding the album four out of a possible five stars. Freeman also argued that, though the band primarily play death metal, they owe "more to Isis and Meshuggah than Morbid Angel or Cannibal Corpse". Blabbermouth's Scott Alisoglu wrote that "The songs are written to jolt just when things approach calm, such as when the relative breeziness of "Omen" (a real epic bastard) erupts in violence at the 3:30 mark or the way that the title track seems to become a vortex of metal shavings and bits of broken glass."

== Track listing ==
All lyrics are written by Paul Kelland; all music is composed by Michael Hoggard and Jamie Saint Merat.

No.	Title	Length
1.	"Burning Skies"	7:33
2.	"Dead Oceans"	7:01
3.	"Cold Becoming"	6:16
4.	"Beneath"	6:56
5.	"The Hollow Idols"	6:06
6.	"Omens"	8:26
7.	"The Destroyers of All"	10:30
Total length:		52:48

== Credits ==
Writing, performance and production credits are adapted from the album liner notes.

=== Personnel ===
==== Ulcerate ====
- Paul Kelland – vocals, bass
- Michael Hoggard – guitar
- Jamie Saint Merat – drums

==== Production ====
- Jamie Saint Merat – engineering, mixing, mastering
- Michael Hoggard – engineering

==== Visual art ====
- Jamie Saint Merat – art, layout

=== Studio ===
- MCA, Auckland, New Zealand – recording (July–September 2010)
