= Human Harvest =

Human Harvest may refer to:

- Human Harvest (album), a 2003 album by Circle of Dead Children
- Bats: Human Harvest, a 2007 Sci-Fi Channel original film
- Human Harvest (film), a 2014 documentary film about human organs harvesting and trafficking in China
