= Corrupt Leaders =

Canadian grindcore/crust band

- Origin: Canada
- Genres: Grindcore, crust punk
- Years active: 2013–2016
- Labels: Give Praise, Moshpit Tragedy
- Past members: Rain Forest; Nick; Steve; Tyson
- Website: corruptleaders.ca (defunct)

Corrupt Leaders is a Canadian grindcore/crust band that formed in April 2013.

They released two 7-inch EPs through Moshpit Tragedy Records (Phobia, Extreme Noise Terror, Doom, etc.) and one 7-inch on Give Praise Records.

In early 2015, Corrupt Leaders released the four-song Grindmother EP, which features a guest vocal from frontman Rain Forest's 66-year-old mother. A video of the recording session went viral, and in April 2016, Grindmother released her own album Age of Destruction, featuring music by Rain Forest and Tyson Apex.

In 2015, Corrupt Leaders appeared at Obscene Extreme America and Maryland Deathfest 2015. The band has been quiet since then; its website and social media accounts are defunct.

== Discography ==
- Self-titled (Moshpit Tragedy Records, 2013)
- Split with Dogma (Moshpit Tragedy Records, 2014)
- Grindmother (Give Praise Records, 2015)
