= Cutting the Throat of God =

Studio album by Ulcerate
- Released: 14 June 2024
- Recorded: September – December 2023
- Genre: Technical death metal; post-metal
- Length: 57:49
- Language: English
- Label: Debemur Morti

Ulcerate chronology
Stare Into Death and Be Still (2020)	Cutting the Throat of God (2024)

Cutting the Throat of God is the seventh studio album by New Zealand technical death metal band Ulcerate. It was released on 14 June 2024 through Debemur Morti Records.

== Critical reception ==
The album was released to critical acclaim. Writing for Metal Hammer magazine, Matt Mills described the album as "everything death metal should be in 2024", writing that "Ulcerate raise their own bar and set a new benchmark for death metal releases this year." Metal Injection's Max Heilman drew comparisons with post-metal bands like Isis, Dissection and Tool, praising in particular the versatility and dynamism of drummer Jamie Saint Merat's performance on drums and the stronger sense of dissonance and melody in Hoggard's guitarwork compared to previous albums. Blabbermouth's Dom Lawson similarly praised the band's performance, concluding that "do not make music that conforms to anyone else's idea of how death metal should sound. In fact, it seems increasingly silly to describe the band in those terms. Cutting the Throat of God is a highly evolved, militantly creative and endlessly fascinating piece of work that merely confirms what sensible folk already know about this band. Ulcerate are astonishing." BrooklynVegan's Andrew Sacher described the album as "mind-bending, mesmerizing heavy music with a real transportive quality to it, and I think it'd be pretty difficult to listen to this album and not feel moved by it."

== Track listing ==
All lyrics are written by Paul Kelland; all music is composed by Michael Hoggard, Paul Kelland and Jamie Saint Merat.

Cutting the Throat of God track listing
No.	Title	Length
1.	"To Flow Through Ashen Hearts"	7:07
2.	"The Dawn is Hollow"	7:33
3.	"Further Opening the Wounds"	7:57
4.	"Transfiguration In and Out of Worlds"	8:33
5.	"To See Death Just Once"	8:24
6.	"Undying as an Apparition"	9:33
7.	"Cutting the Throat of God"	8:42
Total length:		57:49

== Personnel ==
- Jamie Saint Merat – drums, recording engineer, mixing, artwork, design, layout
- Paul Kelland – bass guitar, vocals, lyrics
- Michael Hoggard – guitar
- Magnus Lindberg – mastering

== Charts ==
Chart performance for Cutting the Throat of God
Chart (2024)	Peak position
UK Album Downloads (OCC)	32
