= Ulcerate =

New Zealand-based technical death metal band

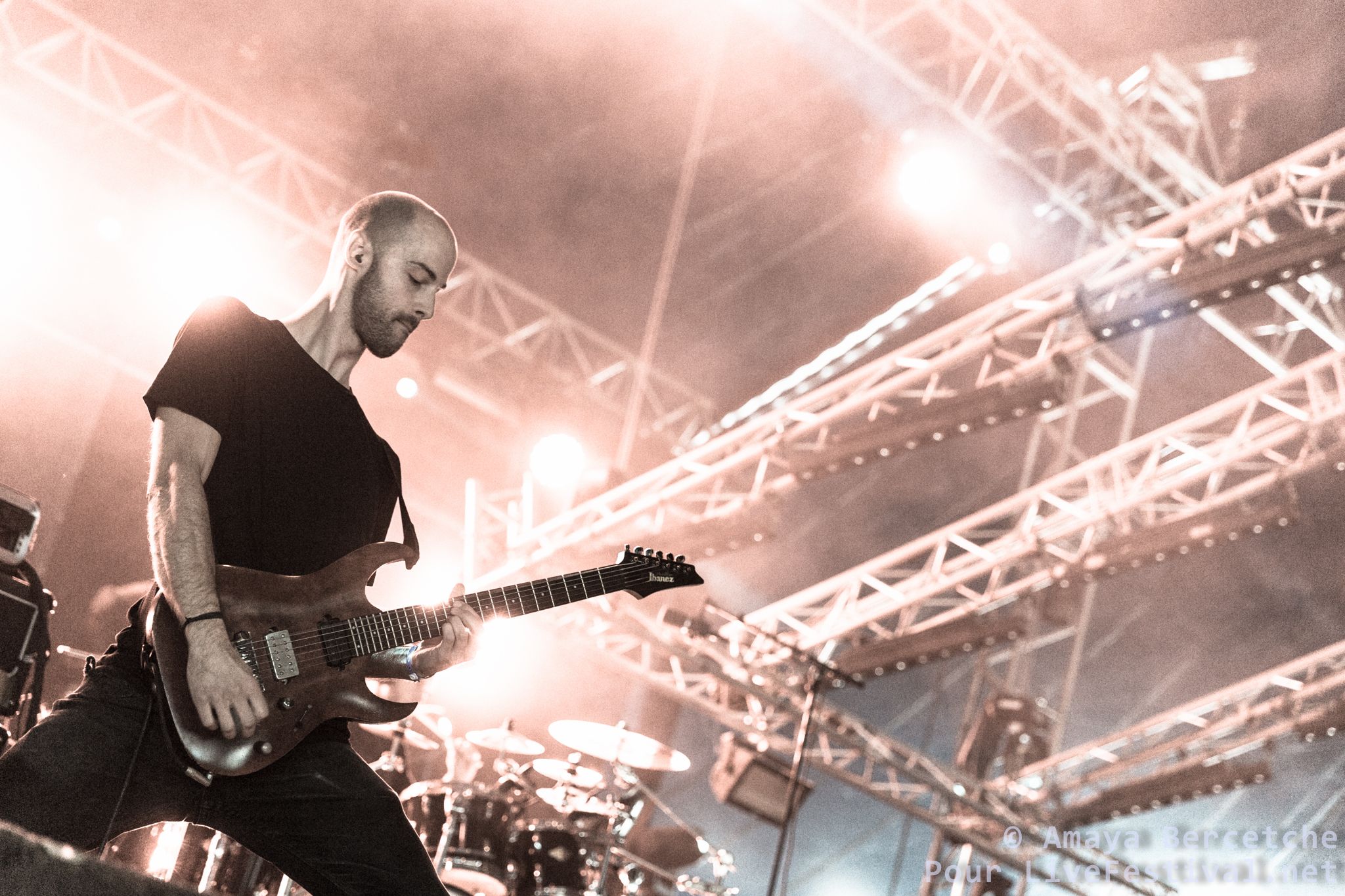
- Guitarist Michael Hoggard at Hellfest 2014

Background information
- Also known as: Bloodwreath (2000-2003)
- Origin: Auckland, New Zealand
- Genres: Technical death metal, post-metal
- Years active: 2000–present
- Labels: Neurotic, Deepsend, Willowtip, Candlelight, Relapse, Debemur Morti
- Members: Jamie Saint Merat; Michael Hoggard; Paul Kelland
- Past members: Mark Seeney; Jared Commerer; James Wallace; Michael Rothwell; Phil Kusabs; Ben Read; Oliver Goater; William Cleverdon
- Website: www.ulcerate-official.com

Ulcerate is a New Zealand-based technical death metal band formed by guitarist Michael Hoggard and drummer Jamie Saint Merat in 2000. The band have released seven studio albums to date. The band have been featured in numerous articles as one of New Zealand's most prominent extreme metal acts, have toured widely across North America and Europe, and have been compared favourably to bands such as Neurosis and Gorguts. The band's sound has been described as "nauseating, disorienting and gleefully disharmonic", and is characterised by extremely technical death metal with extensive use of dissonance, time signature changes, and complex song structures.

== History ==
=== Early days (2000–2005) ===
The core membership of Ulcerate, including Jamie Saint Merat, Michael Hoggard and Mark Seeney, formed in 2000 under the name "Bloodwreath". In early 2002, guitarist Jared Commerer and vocalist James Wallace were added to the line-up while Seeney departed. The band began writing material for its debut recording, Demo 2003, and changed its name to Ulcerate prior to its release. In 2004, the band released its second demo, The Coming of Genocide. Both demos were subsequently compiled and released by The Flood Records and Deepsend Records under the title The Coming of Genocide. After struggling to find stability at the bassist position, the band brought in Paul Kelland in 2005.

=== Of Fracture and Failure and Everything is Fire (2006–2009) ===
In early 2006, Ulcerate signed with Neurotic Records. Vocalist James Wallace left the band in 2006 as the band was preparing to record its first album, Of Fracture and Failure. Ben Read was recruited to fill the vacant vocal position. In contrast with Wallace's lower-pitched growls, Read relied on higher-pitched screams, reminiscent of hardcore vocals. Jared Commerer also left the band and was replaced by guitarist Michael Rothwell. Of Fracture and Failure was recorded and mixed by Jamie Saint Merat and Michael Hoggard. It was mastered by Alan Douches at West West Side Studios, New York, US. The album artwork was created by Jamie Saint Merat.

In 2008, Read and Rothwell departed the band, with Oliver Goater recruited as Ulcerate's new guitarist and bassist Paul Kelland assuming vocal duties. Kelland's approach returned the band to a lower-pitched vocal style. Ulcerate then started writing and recording its second album, Everything Is Fire. The album was acknowledged by critics for its unique approach to death metal, with Allmusic's Phil Freeman praising Everything Is Fire for incorporating the "percussive intricacy of Isis", "intricate scaffold of jagged, art-metal guitar", and use of repetition that was closer to Shellac than Suffocation.

=== The Destroyers of All and Vermis (2010–2014) ===
In April 2010, Ulcerate announced that it was writing songs for a new album. Oliver Goater parted ways with Ulcerate in late 2010, and was replaced by William Cleverdon. The band released its third album, The Destroyers of All, on 25 January 2011, through Willowtip Records. The album was released only "as the core 3 writing members," and did not feature Oliver Goater who left the band prior to the recording of the album.

The band toured across Europe in support of the album in February 2012. The band performed in many countries, including France, the United Kingdom, Germany, Italy, and Slovakia. The band also toured North America for the first time in support of the album in May 2012, including a performance at Maryland Deathfest.

In 2012, Ulcerate signed to Relapse Records and announced plans to record a new album. The album was recorded during March and April 2013 at MCA Studios in Auckland. In July, the band revealed the new album, titled Vermis, would be released on 13 September 2013. The album received positive reviews upon release from Pitchfork, Exclaim!, and others.

The band toured North America in support of the album in May 2014 with the support of Inter Arma. This included a show at the famous Saint Vitus rock bar in New York City. They then engaged in an extensive tour across Europe (again in support of Vermis) from November–December 2014. They were supported by Wormed, Solace of Requiem, and Gigan.

=== Shrines of Paralysis and Stare Into Death and Be Still (2015–2023) ===
The band toured Australia and New Zealand on a number of dates from April–June 2015. In October 2015 Ulcerate headlined a tour across the United Kingdom, supported by Bell Witch and Ageless Oblivion.

On 12 March 2016 the band announced that they were a month away from entering the studio to record their fifth album, with the band posting progress updates on their Facebook page. On 27 June the band officially announced the title, album artwork, and track listing of their fifth album: The album is titled Shrines of Paralysis and will be released through Relapse Records in Fall 2016. They also announced that they would be touring North America with Iceland's Zhrine and Canada's Phobocosm in support of their new album in November 2016. The album was officially released on 28 October 2016.

In March 2017 the band performed at the two-day festival 'Direct Underground Fest' in Sydney and Melbourne, alongside Gorguts, Marduk, Mgła, and Départe.

The band's sixth album Stare Into Death and Be Still was released on 24 April 2020 on Debemur Morti Productions.

=== Cutting the Throat of God (2024–present) ===
On 7 March 2024, the band announced their seventh album, Cutting the Throat of God, would be released on 14 June.

== Musical style and influences ==
Ulcerate perform a highly technical, atmospheric variety of death metal. Their music is extremely dense, compositionally complex, technically demanding, and makes frequent use of unpredictable tempo changes. The band's drummer, Jamie Saint Merat, is considered an extremely important aspect of Ulcerate's sound due to his technical skill and role in composing, recording, producing, and mixing their music, as well as creating the artwork. Guitarist Michael Hoggard is notable for his extensive use of dissonance and guitar effects, and what has been described as "a frenetic mix of exotic chords and unorthodox progressions." Their style has been compared to bands such as Gorguts, Neurosis, Deathspell Omega, Immolation, and Portal.

== Band members ==
Current members

- Michael Hoggard − guitars (2000–present)
- Jamie Saint Merat − drums (2000–present)
- Paul Kelland − vocals (2008–present), bass guitar (2005–present)

Previous members

- Mark Seeney − vocals (2000−2002)
- James Wallace − vocals (2002−2006)
- Phil Smathers − bass (2002)
- Jared Commerer − guitars, bass (2002−2003)
- Reuben − bass (2003)
- Phil Kusabs − bass (2003−2005)
- Michael Rothwell − guitars (2003−2008)
- Ben Read − vocals (2006−2008)
- William Cleverdon − guitars (2010−2012)

Touring/session members

- Oliver Goater − guitars (2009–2010)

Timeline

== Discography ==
=== Studio albums ===
- Of Fracture and Failure (2007)
- Everything Is Fire (2009)
- The Destroyers of All (2011)
- Vermis (2013)
- Shrines of Paralysis (2016)
- Stare Into Death and Be Still (2020)
- Cutting the Throat of God (2024)

=== Extended plays ===
- Ulcerate (2003)
- The Coming of Genocide (2004)

=== Compilation albums ===
- The Coming of Genocide (2006)
