= Japanische Kampfhörspiele =

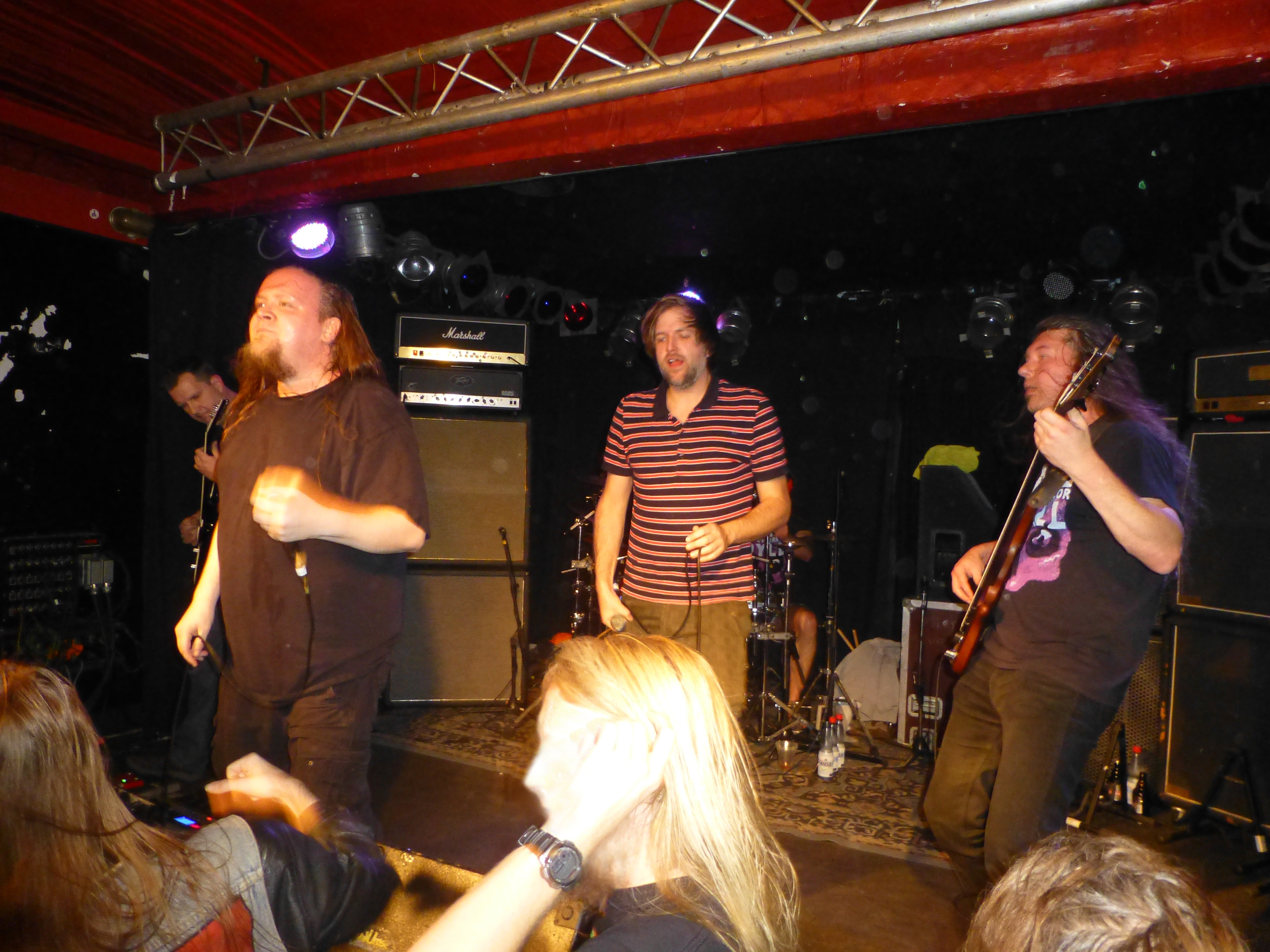
- Japanische Kampfhörspiele 2014

Background information
- Origin: Krefeld, Germany
- Genre: Grindcore
- Years active: 1998–2011, 2014–present
- Labels: Bastardized Recordings, Unundeux
- Website: japanischekampfhoerspiele.de

Japanische Kampfhörspiele, formed in 1998, is a grindcore band from Krefeld, Germany. Their name translates to "Japanese Combat Radio Plays." On later releases, they incorporated some death metal influences, but the band referred to their sound as "grindpunk". They played their farewell concert on January 29, 2011, at the Feierwerk in Munich, a recording of which formed their final release, the DVD Abschiedskonzert. A reunion followed in 2014.

== History ==
Japanische Kampfhörspiele was founded in 1998 by Klaus Nicodem and Christof Kather. Their debut CD was released in 2001 on Blutwurscht Productions. The band then added Daniel and Simon Schaffrath and Marco Bachmann to the line-up for live performances. In 2002, Japanische Kampfhörspiele released Die Großstadt Stinkt, Ist Laut Und Septisch. Simon Schaffrath left the band, and the band stopped playing live. The band focused on song-writing, and in 2003 Bastardized Recordings released the EP Fertigmensch. The band played its first live show in October 2003.

In spring 2004 the band went into the studio again to record Hardcore Aus Der Ersten Welt. Japanische Kampfhörspiele continued to record and release their music through various labels.

In 2008, Japanische Kampfhörspiele performed at music festivals Maryland Deathfest VI (May 25) and Full Force (July 4-6th). They have since played regular live performances.

== Current lineup ==
- Christof Kather - drums, vocals (1998–2011, 2014–present)
- Bajo - bass (2001–2011, 2014–present)
- Robert Nowak - guitar (2004–2011, 2014–present)
- Martin Freund - vocals (2006–2011, 2014–present)
- Christian Markwald - vocals (2016–present)

== Past members ==
- Klaus Nicodem - guitar (1998–2011)
- Daniel Schaffrath - guitar (2000–2004)
- Simon Schaffrath - vocals (2000–2002)
- Markus "Bony" Hoff - vocals (2003–2011, 2014–2016)
- Andreas Paul - vocals (2003–2006)
- FF - vocals (2006)
- René Hauffe - guitar (2008–2011)

== Discography ==
- 1998 - Sektion Jaka
- 1999 - Le Menu De L'Autopsie Des Gagnants Du Grind Prix
- 1999 - Gott Ist Satt
- 2000 - Oslo
- 2000 - Transportbox für Menschen
- 2001 - Nostradamus In Echtzeit
- 2001 - Brandsatzliebe
- 2001 - Japanische Kampfhörspiele compilation album (Blutwurscht)
- 2002 - Die Großstadt Stinkt, Ist Laut Und Septisch (Blutwurscht)
- 2003 - Fertigmensch (Bastardized)
- 2004 - Hardcore Aus Der Ersten Welt (Bastardized)
- 2005 - Split with dasKRILL (Silentstagnation)
- 2005 - Deutschland Von Vorne (cover album, Bastardized)
- 2006 - Split with Poostew (Silentstagnation)
- 2006 - Früher War Auch Nicht Alles Gut (compilation of early works)
- 2007 - Split with Bathtub Shitter (Relapse)
- 2007 - Rauchen und Yoga (Bastardized)
- 2008 - Split with Are You God? (Baskat)
- 2009 - Split with Eisenvater (Power It Up)
- 2009 - Split with White Eyes (Bastardized)
- 2009 - Luxusvernichtung (Unundeux)
- 2010 - Bilder Fressen Strom (Unundeux)
- 2010 - Split with Killer (Beau Travail)
- 2011 - Kaputte Nackte Affen (Unundeux)
- 2011 - Abschiedskonzert (Live DVD, Unundeux)
- 2014 - Welt Ohne Werbung (Unundeux)
- 2016 - The Golden Anthropocene (Unundeux)
- 2018 - Back to Ze Roots (Bastardized)
- 2019 - Verk Ferever (Bastardized)
- 2021 - Neues Aus Dem Halluzinogenozinozän (Bastardized)
- 2022 - Flat Earthers Ball (Bastardized)
- 2023 - Blaskapelle Bürgermeister Bratwurst Bier Geschenkekorb Bibelstelle Bumskabine Bienensterben Völkermord (Bastardized)
- 2024 - Zurück Im Dreck (Bastardized)
- 2026 - Split with Acao Direta (Bastardized)
