= Last Days of Humanity =

Dutch goregrind band

- Origin: Volkel, North Brabant, Netherlands
- Genres: Goregrind; grindcore
- Years active: 1989–2006, 2010–present
- Labels: Bones Brigade, Machine Shop, Rotten Roll Rex
- Members: Hans Smits; Bas van Geffen; Paul Niessen
- Past members: Anne Van De Burgt; Bart Bouwmans; Rogier Kuzee; Boris Cornelissen; Marc Palmen; William van de Ven; Dennis Dekkers; Erwin De Groot; Erwin De Wit; Glenn Jagers; Mark Snijders; Marty Van Sintet; Rutger Noij

Last Days of Humanity is a Dutch goregrind band from North Brabant. They were active from 1989 until 2006, releasing three studio albums between 1996 and 2006, and reformed in 2010. Their music is known for its relentless sound, featuring intense blast beats delivered by drummer Marc Palmen.

The band is recognized as a significant act in the Dutch grindcore scene and is well-known for its contributions to the goregrind genre.

== History ==
Erwin de Wit and Hans Smits frequently visited Soos Plock in Volkel, Netherlands, where they watched performances by Blood, Agathocles, Dreft, and other grindcore and noisecore bands. They were further inspired to form their own band by groups such as Fear of God, Sore Throat, Anal Cunt, and 7 Minutes of Nausea.

Before forming Last Days of Humanity, De Wit was a member of the grindcore band Fatal Error. On 30 December 1989, he organized a show featuring Drudge, Agathocles, and other bands at Plock and added their own noise project to the lineup, leading to the formation of Last Days of Humanity.

The original lineup of the band included two vocalists, De Wit and Smits, who used two distorted screaming voices, altered with a pitch shifter. In 1990, they established a more traditional lineup and planned their first official show, scheduled for 6 October 1990, alongside Fatal Error at Soos Plock.

In 1993, the band recorded their second demo. By 1996, they signed their first record deal and booked two studio days to record their debut album. However, after just one day, they had managed to record only about 12 minutes of music. Their label informed them that they needed to produce an additional 18 minutes within 24 hours or risk having their album unreleased. Following this dispute, they moved to the label Bones Brigade.

The band disbanded in 2006. However, in 2010, Bones Brigade announced that Last Days of Humanity had officially reformed. They performed at Bloodshed Fest 2010 at the Dynamo Club in Eindhoven, Netherlands, and at Maryland Deathfest 2011 at Sonar in Baltimore. They also toured the United Kingdom in December 2011 and played at Hellfest 2011 in Clisson, France, as well as Obscene Extreme 2011 in the Czech Republic.

In March 2021, the band released their first album in 15 years, titled Horrific Compositions of Decomposition.

== Members ==
=== Current members ===
- Hans Smits – vocals (1989–1997, 2006, 2020–?)
- Bas van Geffen – bass, guitar (2001, 2002–2004, 2006, 2020–?)
- Paul Niessen – drums (2020–?)

=== Former members ===
- Erwin de Wit – bass, drums (1989–1992, 1996–2001, 2010–2011)
- Dennis Dekkers – bass (1992–1993)
- Glenn Jagers – drums (1993–1997)
- Martie van Sinten – bass (1994–1995)
- Mark Snijders – guitar (1994–1995)
- Anne van de Burgt – guitar (1996–1998)
- Rutger Noij – drums (1998)
- Bart Boumans – vocals (1998–2000)
- Marc Palmen – drums (1998–2006), vocals (2010–2011)
- Boris Cornelissen – vocals (2000)
- Erwin de Groot – vocals (2001–2005)
- Rogier Kuzee – bass (2002–2006, 2010)
- Melanie Stamp – bass (2010–2014)
- William Van De Ven – guitar (1994–2006, 2010)
- Joep van Raak – drums (2010–2011)

== Discography ==
=== Albums ===
- 1998 – The Sound of Rancid Juices Sloshing Around Your Coffin (Bones Brigade Records, 2013 LP on Fat Ass Records)
- 2000 – Hymns of Indigestible Suppuration (Bones Brigade Records, 2014 Picture LP on Fat Ass Records)
- 2006 – Putrefaction in Progress (Bones Brigade Records, 2015 LP on Fat Ass Records)
- 2021 – Horrific Compositions of Decomposition (Rotten Roll Rex)

=== EPs ===
- 2005 – In Advanced Haemorrhaging Conditions (Bones Brigade Records, 2016 vinyl on Fat Ass Records)
- 2019 – The Complicated Reflex and Depraved Scent of the Retrograde Reflux in Formula (Bizarre Leprous Production)

=== Demos ===
- 1992 – Last Days of Humanity
- 1993 – Human Atrocity (2010 LP on State Fucker Records)

=== Splits ===
- 1994 – Split with Vulgar Degenerate
- 1995 – Pathological Dreams (split with Confessions of Obscurity)
- 1996 – Defleshed by Flies (split with Rakitis) (Morbid Records)
- 2000 – Split up for Better Digestion (split with Morgue) (Evil Biker Records)
- 2001 – Choked in Anal Mange (split with Cock and Ball Torture) (Fleshfeast Records / Unmatched Brutality)
- 2001 – 138 Minutes Body Disposal (split with Stoma)
- 2003 – Dutch Assault (split with Suppository, S.M.E.S. and Inhume) (Relapse Records)
- 2004 – Split with Lymphatic Phlegm (Black Hole Productions)
- 2012 – Split with Necrocannibalistic Vomitorium
- 2017 – Split with F.U.B.A.R.
- 2020 – Split with Rectal Smegma and Cliteater (Rotten Roll Rex)

=== Other ===
- 2001 – Comeback of Goregods: Tribute to Regurgitate (compilation) (Bizarre Leprous Production)
- 2004 – The XTC of Swallowing L.D.O.H. Faeces (live album) (Bones Brigade Records)
- 2007 – Rest in Gore 1989–2006 (Bones Brigade Records)
- 2012 – Goresurrection (Grind Block Records)
