= Ben Janssen =

Dutch musician

Ben Janssen is a guitar player from the Netherlands. He currently is active in the bands Inhume and Skullhog. Before that, he also played in Malignant, Asphyx, Penectomy, and Eviscerated. He also appears in several side-projects, including a Righteous Pigs inspired project with guitarist Loek Peeters of Skullhog and Inhume, vocalist Joost Silvrants of Inhume, and drummer Erik of Legion of the Damned.

== Discography ==
=== Malignant ===
- (1990) Sacriligous Writh rehearsal demo
- (1992) Segruocs Lacitsaiselce demo

=== Inhume ===
- (1995) Demo 1 demo
- (1996) Grind Your Mind Inhume / Suppository (Netherlands), live split tape (boerderij geleen)
- (1997) The Missing Limb, Demo 2 demo
- (1997) Enjoying The Violence? Inhume / Mundo De Mierda (Ecuador) split tape
- (1998) Inhume / Blood Split 7" single Inhume / Blood (Germany)
- (1999) Decomposing from Inside CD on Bones Brigade record label
- (2003) Dutch Assault split CD with Inhume, Suppository, S.M.E.S., Last Days of Humanity on Relapse Records record label
- (2003) In for the Kill CD & LP on Osmose Productions record label
- (2007) Chaos Dissection Order CD on Osmose Productions record label
- (2008) Inhume / Mumakil Split 7" single with Mumakil on Relapse Records Slimewave Series record label
- (2008) Multiple Sclerosis: True Story To be released in 2008 CD on Osmose Productions record label

=== Skullhog ===
- (2000) The Shed mini CD on So It Is Done Productions record label
- (2003) Grinding Is Not a Crime compilation album CD Emergence Records record label
- (2006) Camp Blood full-length CD on No Escape Records record label
- (2006) The Shed mini CD rerelease on No Escape Records record label
- (2008) "Split 7" single with Regurgitate on Regurgitated Semen Records record label
- (2008) "Split 7" single with Coffins on No Escape Records record label
- (2008) Camp Blood full-length limited edition LP on Timeless Wounds Productions
- (2008) Skullhog / Bloodbastard split CD on Redrum Records record label
