= Violence Dimension =

Studio album by Conan
- Released: 25 April 2025
- Length: 46:40
- Label: Heavy Psych
- Producer: Chris Fielding

Conan chronology
Evidence of Immortality (2022)	Violence Dimension (2025)

Singles from Violence Dimension
- 1. "Frozen Edges of the Wound" Released: 22 January 2025

Violence Dimension is the sixth studio album by British doom metal band Conan. It was released on 25 April 2025 via Heavy Psych Sounds.

== Background ==
The album, produced by Chris Fielding, was the first release by the band through Heavy Psych Sounds. It was preceded by the band's 2022 Napalm Records release, Evidence of Immortality. Jon Davis of the band stated, "This release explores the hinterland between being scared to live and being scared to die, and punches holes in the idea that we must live our life by one set of rules."

"Frozen Edges of the Wound" was released as a single from the album on 22 January 2025.

== Reception ==
Professional ratings
Review scores
Source	Rating
Distorted Sound	8/10
Metal Hammer	8/10 stars
New Noise	5/5 stars
Sputnikmusic	3.8/5

In a five-star rating for New Noise, Ray Romanski stated that the album "brings the Neanderthal heaviness they're known for to new lows—low tuning, low frequency, subterranean levels of muck." Sputnikmusic reviewer Raul Stanciu assigned it a rating of 3.8 out of five and commented about the production that it "fits like a glove with its dense sound" and the album that it switches "between bulldozing riffage and muddy grooves."

The album received a rating of eight from Distorted Sound reviewer Adam Robertshaw, who remarked, "The guitars and bass are both saturated with so much low end and fuzz, each strike or a chord sounds like a volcanic eruption, and the drums are punchier than on any other Conan record." Metal Hammer's Perran Helyes gave it a rating of eight, noting "Frontman Jon Davis still cries out every word like he's scaling a castle wall with burning pitch speckling his skin, and Johnny King remains one of metal's most underrated sticks men for uniquely obnoxious yet unconventional rhythms, like the unpredictable tempo spikes that end Desolation Hexx."

== Track listing ==
Violence Dimension track listing
No.	Title	Length
1.	"Foeman's Flesh"	9:15
2.	"Desolation Hexx"	5:18
3.	"Total Bicep"	9:26
4.	"Violence Dimension"	9:13
5.	"Frozen Edges of the Wound"	3:20
6.	"Warpsword"	0:45
7.	"Ocean of Boiling Skin"	10:03
Total length:		46:40
