= Everything Is Fire =

Studio album by Ulcerate
- Released: April 7, 2009
- Recorded: September–October 2008
- Studio: MCA Studios, Auckland, New Zealand
- Genre: Technical death metal
- Length: 50:34
- Label: Willowtip
- Producer: Ulcerate

Ulcerate chronology
Of Fracture and Failure (2007)	Everything Is Fire (2009)	The Destroyers of All (2011)

Everything Is Fire is the second studio album by New Zealand technical death metal band Ulcerate. It was released on April 7, 2009 through Willowtip Records to very positive reviews, and has been described by Roadburn as "genre-defining". Lyrically, the album has been described as tackling themes such as "the end of mankind, the insignificance of our existence and the resumption of a natural order, free of humanity’s tyranny, greed and bloodlust."

Willowtip Records issued the album on vinyl for the first time in January 2016 on limited edition gatefold vinyl.

== Background ==
Everything Is Fire is the first Ulcerate album not to feature Ben Read on vocals, with bassist Paul Kelland taking on vocal duties. In an interview with Metalnews.de, Jamie Saint Merat explained that "We wanted a return to the darker vocal approach that we originally started the band with. Prior to 'Of Fracture and Failure' we were keen to try a more varied vocal assault, and Ben certainly fitted that mould perfectly. But as we were writing 'Everything...' it became apparent that we really wanted the vocal to provide more of a solid backbone, and really support the music than sitting out front."

== Musical style and writing ==
Jamie Saint Merat said in an interview that "It's not a concept album in the traditional sense, but there is an obvious outlining theme. Basically, 'Everything is Fire' is a quote from Greek philosopher Heraclitus meaning everything is in a constant state of change and progression, more-so than chaos. One thing I have to point out is that it's not apocalyptic in any way, it's just a statement and an observation of how things are, or at least how they can be perceived." Paul Kelland, who wrote all the lyrics to the album, described the title track as the "cornerstone" of the album. "Everything is in a constant state of change. We cannot accept anything as face value. Question and rationalise everything, and always continue to." In a separate interview with Brutal Carnage Zine, Jamie Saint Merat described the album as mostly being a commentary on "human arrogance and how we perceive our place in our environments, how we deify objects and people out of pure tradition with very little rationalism."

PopMatters have described the album as "Firmly rooted in simple, suffocating death metal, yet willing to venture further and incorporate dissonance and expansive, atmospheric passages". Reviews by AllMusic and Sputnik Music have made comparisons to death metal bands such as Immolation, Gorguts, and Morbid Angel, post-metal bands such as Isis and Neurosis, as well as Shellac.

== Critical reception ==
Professional ratings
Review scores
Source	Rating
AllMusic	4/5 stars
Metalreview.com	6/6 stars
PopMatters	7/10
Sputnikmusic	5/5 stars

The album received universally positive reviews from critics, and appeared on Metalreview.com's 100 Most Essential Albums of the Decade. AllMusic's Phil Freeman wrote that "their ability to move the music forward at what seems like a crushingly slow pace while in fact playing quite fast is hypnotic", concluding that "this is a seriously impressive album by a band that deserves an audience far beyond their tiny homeland." Sputnik Music gave the album a perfect rating in a wide-ranging review touching on all aspects of the album, describing Everything Is Fire as "the quintessential death metal album of its era, and the yardstick by which future efforts should be compared to." Jaime Merat's performance on the drums was singled out for particular praise, as were Michael Hoggard's "frenetic mix of exotic chords and unorthodox progressions", and Paul Kelland's vocals and lyrics. "The band’s ability to shift from jarring riff barrages to liquid ceasefires and back is one of their most invaluable assets as songwriters, thanks in no small part to their meticulous calibration of aesthetics."

== Track listing ==
All lyrics are written by Kelland; all music is composed by Hoggard and Merat.

No.	Title	Length
1.	"Drown Within"	6:42
2.	"We Are Nil"	5:41
3.	"Withered and Obsolete"	6:10
4.	"Caecus"	6:26
5.	"Tyranny"	5:22
6.	"The Earth at Its Knees"	5:45
7.	"Soullessness Embraced"	6:36
8.	"Everything Is Fire"	7:52
Total length:		50:34

== Credits ==
Writing, performance and production credits are adapted from the album liner notes.

=== Personnel ===
==== Ulcerate ====
- Paul Kelland – vocals, bass
- Michael Hoggard – guitar
- Oliver Goater – guitar
- Jamie Saint Merat – drums

==== Production ====
- Jamie Saint Merat – engineering, mixing, mastering
- Michael Hoggard – engineering, mixing

==== Visual art ====
- Jamie Saint Merat – art, layout

=== Studio ===
- MCA, Auckland, New Zealand – recording (September–October 2008)
