= Cenotaph (band) =

Turkish death metal band

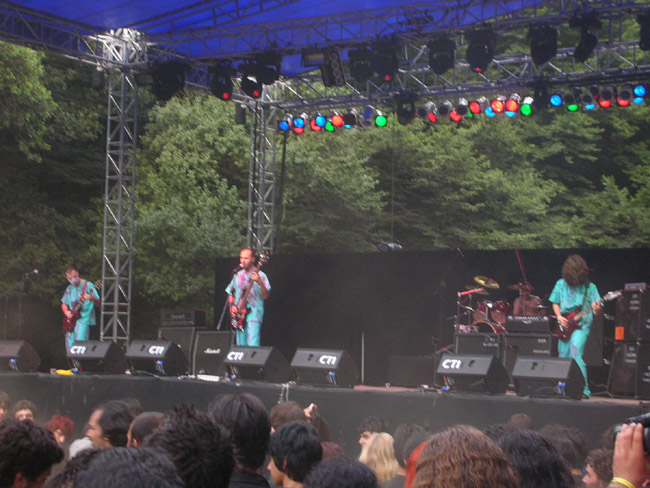

Background information
- Origin: Ankara, Turkey
- Genres: Brutal death metal
- Years active: 1993-present
- Labels: Sevared Records, Coyote Records
- Members: Batu Çetin; Alper Çınar; Alican Erbaş; Serhat Kaya; Erkin Öztürk
- Website: Official Facebook page

Cenotaph is a Turkish death metal band from Ankara. They formed in 1993 and released their first demo, Life Immortal in 1995. Since then, they have released seven full-length albums. The band has suffered numerous lineup changes since their inception. Singer Batu Çetin remains the group's only consistent member. They are signed to Sevared Records (for US distribution) and Coyote Records (for European distribution).

== Biography ==
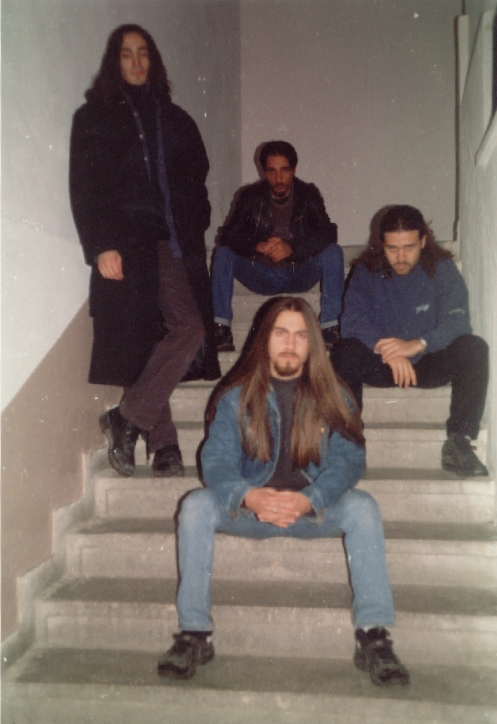
Cenotaph in c. 1996

Singer Batu Çetin formed Cenotaph in the summer of 1994. After various changes in the band's lineup, they released their first independent demo, Life Immortal, in 1995, with Çetin (vocals), Coşkun Kaplan (guitar), Bülent İzgeç (bass), and Bülent Güngör (drums). The demo led to the band's playing shows and festivals in Ankara, Turkey.

In 1996, drummer Bülent Güngör was replaced with Goremaster, completing a line-up that did not change until 1999. With the new line-up, Cenotaph recorded their second demo-promo, Promo '96, in 1996. In the summer of 1996, Cenotaph entered Yeşilkart Studios in Istanbul, to record their eight-song debut album, Voluptuously Minced, and signed with local label Hammer Müzik. Voluptuously Minced was distributed in CD format by various labels in approximately 25 countries, and reached a wide range of listeners in Turkey in tape/CD format.

In 1998, the band recorded their second album, Puked Genital Purulency, (Note: "Purulency" is a rare form of "purulence," which means "the condition of containing or discharging pus," according to Wiktionary.) at Stüdyo Forte in Istanbul. Puked Genital Purulency was released by Hammer Müzik in MC and CD format in 1999. After the album was released, bassist Bülent and guitarist Coşkun left the band for personal reasons. Çetin recruited Başar Çetin and Cihan Akün.

This new line-up performed at Ankara's Rockstation Festival in 2002. After the fest, the band began to work on new songs for an upcoming album. Between January and March 2003, Cenotaph recorded their third album, Pseudo Verminal Cadaverium, at Zoo Sound Studios in Ankara. Mastering was done at the Mega Wimp Sound Studios in Germany. The album was released worldwide in the summer of 2003 by American label United Guttural Records. Release and distribution in Turkey was done by Çetin's label, Drain Productions. To promote the release, Cenotaph performed in Istanbul in January 2004, at Germany's extreme metal fest Fuck the Commerce in May 2005, and Ukraine's Metal Heads Mission festival in August 2007.

Ex-guitarist Coşkun, who left the band in 1999, returned in 2005 as the bass player. Dursun quit the band in 2005, and the band continued with Semih, previously their session drummer for the shows abroad, as the new and full-time drummer. In 2006, the first two albums were gathered on one CD and re-released under the title of Voluptuously Puked Genitals by Burning Dogma Records from Texas. On May 27, 2006, the band performed at the fourth Maryland Deathfest in Baltimore, and in September 2007 released their fourth studio album, Reincarnation in Gorextasy.

After the release of their fifth album, Putrescent Infectious Rabidity, in 2010, Çetin focused on his side projects for the next several years. In June 2017, their sixth album, Perverse Dehumanized Dysfunctions, came out. Their seventh album, Precognition to Eradicate, was released on October 13, 2021.

== Line-up ==
=== Current members ===
- Batu Çetin − vocals (1993–present)
- Mattis Butcher − guitar (2019–present)
- Eren Pamuk – bass (2019–present)
- Mat Trak − drums (2022–present)

=== Former members ===
- Lille Gruber – (2010)
- Bülent Güngör − drums (1994–1996)
- Goremaster − drums (1996–2005)
- Semih Ornek (Barbar) − drums (2005–2006; 2009)
- Çağlar Yürüt – drums (2006-2009)
- Lille Gruber – drums (2009-2011)
- Bülent İzgeç − bass (1994–1999)
- Coşkun Kaplan – bass (2005-2008), guitar (1994–1999)
- Başar Çetin – guitar (1999–2008)
- Cenker Yılmaz – guitar (1999-2002)
- Cihan Akün – guitar (2002-2010)
- Serhat Kaya − guitar (2011–2013)
- Deniz Can Kurt – bass (2008-2010)
- Alper Çınar − bass (2011–2013)
- Burak Tavus – bass (2013-2015)
- Alican Erbaş – drums (2010-2018)
- Erkin Öztürk – guitar (2010-2019)
- Florent Duployer − drums (2019–2022)

== Discography ==
=== Albums ===
- Voluptously Minced (1996)
- Puked Genital Purulency (1999)
- Pseudo Verminal Cadaverium (2003)
- Reincarnation in Gorextasy (2007)
- Putrescent Infectious Rabidity (2010)
- Perverse Dehumanized Dysfunctions (2017)
- Precognition to Eradicate (2021)

=== Compilations ===
- Voluptously Puked Genitals (2005)
- Complete Demo's & Rehearsals '94-'96 (2011)
- Re-puked Purulency (2011)

=== DVD ===
- Guttural Sounds of Morbid Putrefaction (2011)
