= Of Fracture and Failure =

Studio album by Ulcerate
- Released: February 2007
- Recorded: April 2006
- Studio: Retractile Audio
- Genre: Technical death metal
- Length: 45:14
- Label: Willowtip; Neurotic
- Producer: Ulcerate

Ulcerate chronology
The Coming of Genocide (2004)	Of Fracture and Failure (2007)	Everything Is Fire (2009)

Of Fracture and Failure is the debut studio album by New Zealand technical death metal band Ulcerate. The album was released in February 2007 through Neurotic Records in partnership with Willowtip Records, with whom the band would later sign. Written over a two-year period, the album was recorded in April 2006 at Retractile Audio and mastered by Alan Douches at West Side Music, New York City, USA. It is the only album to feature Ben Read (8 Foot Sativa, The Mark of Man) on vocals before bassist Paul Kelland took over vocal duties in 2009.

Jamie Saint Merat has said that the band "set out from the beginning of writing to come up with a sound bordering on chaos and very suffocating in terms of breathing space (or lack thereof). So this resulted in a serious amount of parts per song that all needed to be bridged together to work." In retrospect, he commented that "we were experimenting with some very linear song writing, the songs took a long time to put together, and sometimes when I listen back it feels like some of it is convoluted for the sake of it. We were very intent on creating a mindf**k of a listen, something that steamrolls you first time round."

Lyrically, "the album’s lyrics form a sort of conceptual basis in the sense that they’re loosely chronological, the opening of the album is documenting man’s foibles and ignorance, leading through to tracks such as Failure (self explanatory), The Coming of Genocide (man killing his own kind) and Defaeco, which resolves the album and lyrically documents our end..."

== Track listing ==
All lyrics are written by Ben Read; all music is composed by Ulcerate.

No.	Title	Length
1.	"Praise and Negation"	4:14
2.	"Ad Nauseam"	3:40
3.	"The Mask of the Satyr"	6:33
4.	"Becoming the Lycanthrope"	4:14
5.	"To Fell Goliath"	3:47
6.	"Martyr of the Soil"	7:34
7.	"Failure"	2:53
8.	"The Coming of Genocide"	3:38
9.	"Defaeco"	8:41
Total length:		45:14

== Personnel ==
Personnel adapted from AllMusic.

- Ben Read – vocals, lyrics
- Michael Hoggard – guitar, mixing
- Michael Rothwell – guitar
- Paul Kelland – bass
- Jamie Saint Merat – drums, mixing, artwork, design
- Alan Douches - mastering
