= Magrudergrind =

Washington, D.C. grindcore band

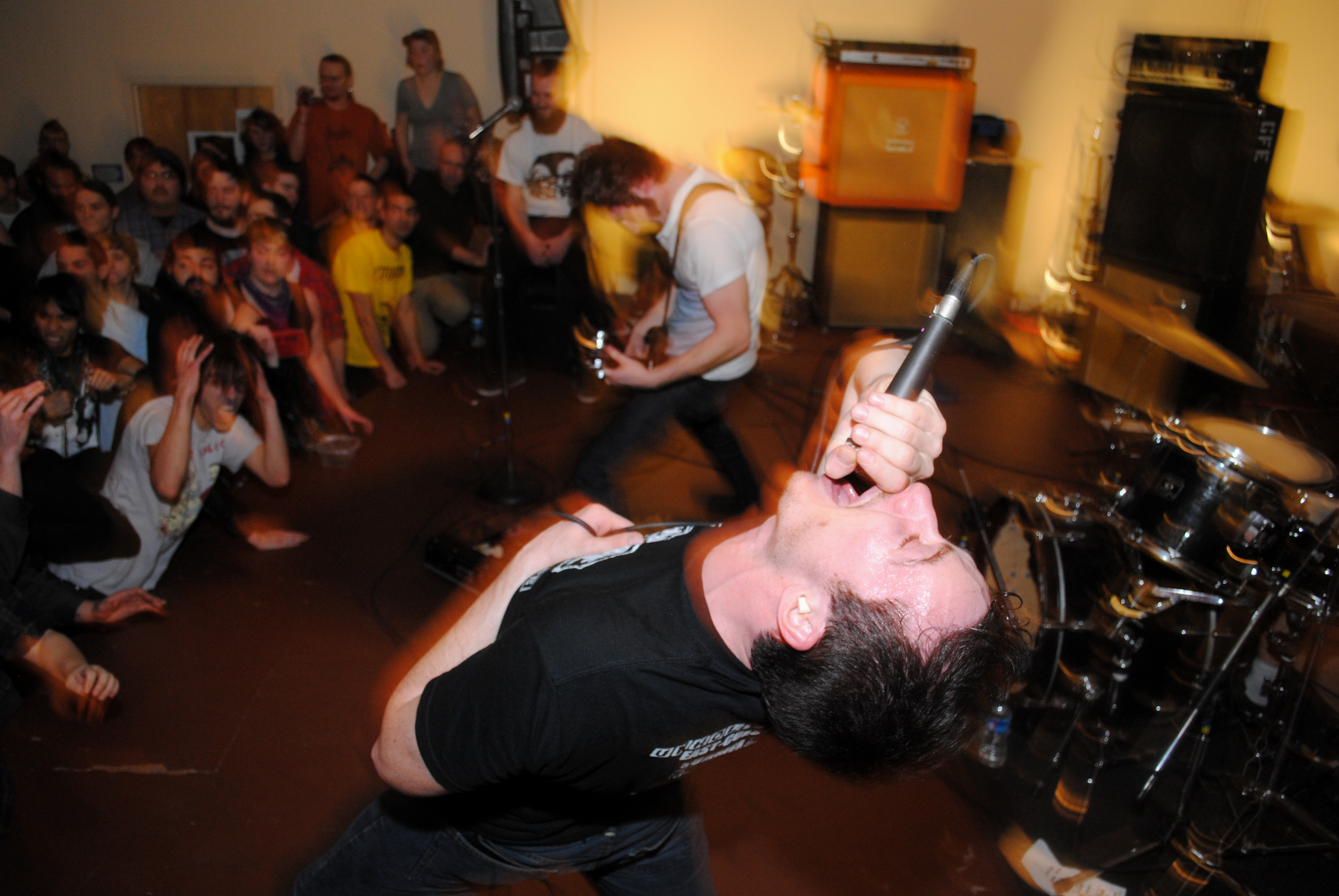
- Magrudergrind live on March 12, 2011

Background information
- Origin: Washington, D.C., United States
- Genres: Grindcore, powerviolence
- Years active: 2002–2016
- Labels: Relapse, Robotic Empire, Scion Audio/Visual, Willowtip, Bones Brigade, Six Weeks, To Live A Lie
- Members: Avi Kulawy; Casey Moore; R.J. Ober
- Past members: Marc Levin; Chris Moore; Mourice Alvardo

Magrudergrind was an American grindcore band formed in 2002. They have released numerous splits and three full-length albums. Since its inception the band has toured Europe and North America multiple times, Puerto Rico, Japan, and South East Asia, along with Exhumed, Despise You, Misery Index, Unholy Grave, Phobia, and Rotten Sound.

== Biography ==
In 2007, Magrudergrind released their first full-length, Rehashed, on Six Weeks Records.

In 2009, Magrudergrind's second full-length, self-titled record was released on Willowtip Records, engineered by Kurt Ballou (Converge, Misery Index, Torche) and mastered by Scott Hull (Pig Destroyer, Phobia). The album features sampled clips from movies, ranging from Tetsuo: The Iron Man to Boyz in the Hood.

During 2010, Magrudergrind appeared at the Scion Rock Festival in Ohio in March, the Maryland Deathfest, Memorial Day weekend and Hellfest in Clisson, France in June 2010. Magrudergrind also appeared at the SXSW Music Festival in Austin, Texas, and European metal festivals in the Netherlands, Portugal and Czech Republic, including the Obscene Extreme festival.

In 2010, Magrudergrind released the Crusher EP on Scion Audio/Visual in America and on Bones Brigade Records and RSR in Europe. In 2012 this was re-released on To Live A Lie Records in the United States. In 2011, they performed at the inaugural Metal Suckfest in New York.

In 2012, they appeared in an episode of Veep titled "Nicknames". They performed onstage and were described as an extreme metal band. In February 2015, the band signed to Relapse Records, and announced that they planned to release another full-length at the end of 2015. In 2016, they released their last album, II.

== Members ==
- Avi Kulawy – vocals (2002–2016)
- R.J. Ober – guitar (2007–2016)
- Casey Moore – drums (2013–2016)
- Marc Levin – guitar (2002–2005)
- Chris Moore – drums (2002–2013)
- Mourice Alvarado – guitar, vocals (2005–2007)

== Discography ==
=== Albums ===
- Religious Baffle (2003, self-released)
- Don't Support Humanitary Aid Led by the Church (2003, self-released)
- Sixty Two Trax of Thrash 2002–2005 (2005, Torture Garden Picture Company/To Live A Lie Records/Death, Agony & Screams Records)
- Rehashed (2007, Six Weeks)
- Magrudergrind (2009, Willowtip Records)
- II (2016, Relapse Records)

=== EPs ===
- Owned! 7-inch (2004, Punks Before Profits Records)
- Crusher CD/10" (2010, Scion Audio/Visual/Bones Brigade/Kaotoxin/To Live A Lie)

=== Splits ===
- split 7-inch with Vomit Spawn (2004, Militant Records)
- split tape with Akkolyte (2004, Death, Agony, & Screams Records)
- split 7-inch with A Warm Gun (2005, McCarthyism Records/Misfire Records)
- split 7-inch with Godstomper (2005, Nuclear BBQ Party Records/To Live A Lie Records)
- split 7-inch with Sanitys Dawn (2005, Regurgitated Semen Records)
- split 7-inch with Sylvester Staline (2006, Bones Brigade Records)
- split CD/LP with Shitstorm (2006, Robotic Empire Records)
