= Hooded Menace =

Finnish death-doom band

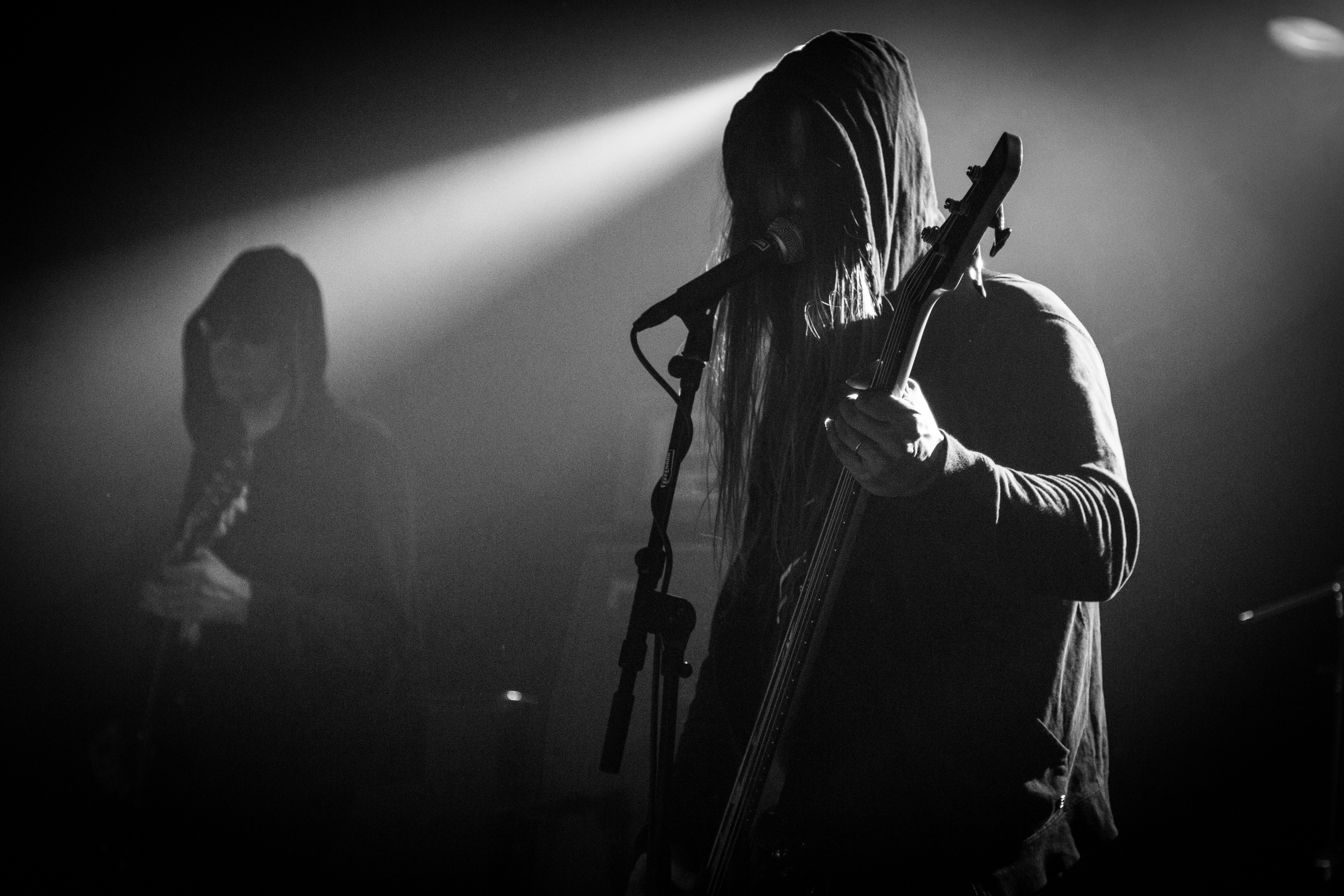
- Hooded Menace at the Eindhoven Metal Meeting in 2015

Background information
- Origin: Joensuu, Finland
- Genre: Death-doom
- Years active: 2007–present
- Labels: Season of Mist, Relapse, Profound Lore
- Members: Lasse Pyykkö; Harri Kuokkanen; Antti Poutanen
- Past members: Markus Makkonen; Oula Kerkelä; Antti Salminen; Pekka Koskelo; Jori Sara-aho; The Hunchback; Crimson Executioner; Teemu Hannonen; Otso Ukkonen
- Website: hoodedmenace.com

Hooded Menace are a Finnish death-doom band formed in Joensuu in 2007 by guitarist Lasse Pyykkö, who had performed in death metal band Phlegethon.

== History ==
The band started their career recording the two-track demo The Eyeless Horde in 2007, released on 7" vinyl the following year. The band released their debut album, Fulfill the Curse, in 2008. They followed up with sophomore full-length album Never Cross the Dead, in 2010.

Their third full-length album, Effigies of Evil, was released in 2012. Darkness Drips Forth followed in 2015. The band have released several split albums and EPs, with bands such as Asphyx.

The band have toured Europe and North America, performing at many metal festivals such as Hellfest, Roadburn, Maryland Deathfest, Tuska, and Party San Open Air among others.

The band released their fifth studio album, Ossuarium Silhouettes Unhallowed in 2018, followed by their sixth and seventh studio releases, The Tritonus Bell in 2021, and Lachrymose Monuments of Obscuration in 2025.

== Musical style and influences ==
The band play a hybrid genre of music known as death-doom, which blends elements of death metal and doom metal, claiming influence from bands such as Candlemass, Cathedral, Paradise Lost, Asphyx and Winter, among others. The band's lyrics are influenced by horror fiction, particularly films such as Tombs of the Blind Dead.

== Members ==
=== Current members ===
- Lasse Pyykkö – guitar (2007–present) bass (2010–2012, 2018–present) vocals (2010–2016)
- Pekka Koskelo – drums (2009–2010, 2011–2017, 2018-present)
- Harri Kuokkanen – vocals (2016–present)

=== Former members ===
- Jori Sara-Aho – bass (2010) drums (2010–2011)
- Antti Salminen – bass (2010–2011)
- Oula Kerkelä – vocals (2010–2011)
- Markus Makkonen – bass, vocals (2012–2016)
- Antti Poutanen – bass (2017–2018)
- Otso Ukkonen – drums (2017–2018)
- Teemu Hannonen – guitar (2012–2023)

== Discography ==
Studio albums

- Fulfill the Curse (2008)
- Never Cross the Dead (2010)
- Effigies of Evil (2012)
- Darkness Drips Forth (2015)
- Ossuarium Silhouettes Unhallowed (2018)
- The Tritonus Bell (2021)
- Lachrymose Monuments of Obscuration (2025)

Demos

- The Eyeless Horde (2007)

Compilations

- Gloom Immemorial (2015)

Split albums and EPs

- Hooded Menace/Anima Morte (2010)
- Hooded Meance/Coffins (2010)
- Asphyx/Hooded Menace (2011)
- Hooded Menace/Ilsa (2011)
- Necrotic Monuments (2012)
- Hooded Menace/Horse Latitudes (2012)
- Labyrinth of Carrion Breeze (2014)
- A View from the Rope (2014)
- Hooded Menace/Algoma (2017)
