= Shrines of Paralysis =

Studio album by Ulcerate
- Released: October 28, 2016
- Recorded: April 2016
- Studio: MCA Studios and Depot Studios, Auckland, New Zealand
- Genre: Technical death metal, post-metal
- Length: 57:44
- Language: English
- Label: Relapse Records

Ulcerate chronology
Vermis (2013)	Shrines of Paralysis (2016)	Stare Into Death and Be Still (2020)

Shrines of Paralysis is the fifth studio album by New Zealand technical death metal band Ulcerate. The album was released on October 28, 2016, through Relapse Records. The album was officially announced on June 27, 2016, with the band confirming that they would be touring North America in support of the album in late 2016 with Phobocosm and Zhrine, including a show at the Saint Vitus bar in New York City. On August 23, 2016, the release date for the album was confirmed for October 28, 2016 and the band began streaming the album's first single, 'Extinguished Light'. On its release, the album received positive reviews from music critics, and later featured on a number of end-of-year lists.

== Musical style and writing ==
Jamie Saint Merat has explained that the album title represents and represents the species’ apathy and inabilities in dealing with self-imposed catastrophe until it’s beyond the point of reconciliation. In general, the lyrics speak of mankind’s arrogance and narcissism, and failure to respect our irrelevance in the broadest possible sense. The artwork ties in with this inextricably and provides a visual metaphor of the sonic content of the album." The band altered their approach to songwriting, recording and production in comparison to previous albums, with Merat explaining that "In terms of melody, it feels like now is the time for us to pull back from dissonance twenty-four-seven and really start making more melodic music". In his review of the album, music critic John D. Buchanan noted that the album's style was broadly in line with the band's 2008 album Everything Is Fire, but with slight variations, nuances and improvements. He described the album's style as "Sheets and shards of incredibly abrasive, harsh, dissonant guitar work pile up over a pummeling onslaught of drums and grinding bass, and vocalist/lyricist Paul Kelland roars like a wounded animal. Creating a palpable aura of fear, dread, and despair, it's like a black hole that sucks all the light out of the room." He also noted that "This is not just noise, by any means: there is both melody and harmony here, and, while dissonant, the music has, at times, its own strange beauty. There are hints of both classical and jazz influence, and the gloomy, gothic pall of classic doom metal."

== Recording and production ==
In an interview, Jamie Saint Merat said the following about the recording process:

We split the tracking of instruments over 2 studios, both for convenience and tonal reasons. Drums were tracked at MCA studios here in Auckland over 2 days – nothing too exciting to report, I just track as efficiently as possible, I like to do full takes for the most part with minimal punch-ins to keep the energy of the performance intact. I’m also staunch about zero editing and quantisation after the fact too. We tracked guitars and bass in Auckland also at Depot Studios over a 5 day period, which went smoothly, but was extremely fatiguing in terms of the sheer amount of tracks we needed to lay down (4 channels of rhythm guitars, 2 of bass, between 3 and 4 of additional lead/overlay guitars). Vox were tracked in a day or 2 also at MCA, and I worked on the mix and master over a 2 week period after tracking was done and dusted.

== Reception ==
=== Critical reception ===
Professional ratings
Review scores
Source	Rating
AllMusic	4/5 stars
Exclaim!	8/10
Metal Hammer	3.5/5 stars
Sputnik Music	4.8/5

Shrines of Paralysis has received very positive reviews from music critics. Sputnik Music described the album as a "masterpiece of musicianship, composition and imagery", writing that "In keeping with Ulcerate opuses of the past, Shrines of Paralysis hides all of its nuances from plain view, uncovering them only for the most devout. Return with regularity and the mosaic begins to piece itself together." Invisible Oranges also praised the album, writing that "A lot of technical death metal gets described as knotty, but Ulcerate are much better at untangling the strands", and that "This decentralized and evasive approach to brutality captures the essence of death metal at its onset – a sense of unease and terrifying otherness – without ever falling prey to the genre’s tropes." Metal Hammer's Dom Lawson described the album as "intensely internal music, wrung from the darkest depths of the New Zealanders’ collective consciousness and spewed out with flailing abandon like Cthulhu bursting through the earth’s surface. It speaks of unimaginable horrors, as barbarous and excruciating maelstroms of dissonance and rhythmic ebb and flow like the opening Abrogation and the unnervingly bleak There Are No Saviours unfold." He concluded that the album is "another evolutionary jump for these shadowy Kiwis, but not one that caters to the easily bewildered." AllMusic's John D. Buchanan praised the album, writing that "this is death metal like she should be wrote."

=== Accolades ===
Publication	Accolade	Rank	Ref.
AllMusic	Favorite Metal Albums 2016	-	
Exclaim!	Top 10 Metal & Hardcore Albums of 2016	8	
Sputnikmusic	Staff's Top 50 Albums of 2016	6	

== Track listing ==
All lyrics are written by Paul Kelland; all music is composed by Michael Hoggard and Jamie Saint Merat.

No.	Title	Length
1.	"Abrogation"	5:51
2.	"Yield to Naught"	7:44
3.	"There Are No Saviours"	8:05
4.	"Shrines of Paralysis"	9:25
5.	"Bow to Spite"	1:55
6.	"Chasm of Fire"	8:08
7.	"Extinguished Light"	8:43
8.	"End the Hope"	7:53
Total length:		57:44

== Personnel ==
- Paul Kelland – vocals, bass
- Michael Hoggard – guitar
- Jamie Saint Merat − drums, engineering, mixing, mastering, art, layout
- Brad Boatright - format mastering
