= Rauchen und Yoga =

Studio album by Japanische Kampfhörspiele
- Released: September 12, 2007
- Genre: Grindcore, Death metal
- Length: 36:26
- Label: Bastardized Recordings

Japanische Kampfhörspiele chronology
Früher War Auch Nicht Alles Gut (2006)	Rauchen und Yoga (2007)	Luxusvernichtung (2009)

Rauchen und Yoga is an album by German band Japanische Kampfhörspiele.

== Track listing ==
No.	Title	Length
1.	"Der Angriff startet"	2:49
2.	"Der Hund kriegt nichts"	2:53
3.	"Eruiert"	1:31
4.	"Wir haben nicht gewusst, dass es solche Lager gibt"	2:00
5.	"Kundenbetreuer"	1:17
6.	"Punkerpolente"	1:10
7.	"Hungerhilfe"	1:57
8.	"Steig aus"	1:02
9.	"Das Experiment"	2:52
10.	"Betatier"	1:47
11.	"Komm, wir drehen einen Porno"	0:57
12.	"Leute ohne Lust"	2:49
13.	"18:46:53"	1:19
14.	"Erfolg verdammt"	1:26
15.	"Rauchen und Yoga"	2:34
16.	"Böses Blut"	1:30
17.	"Verrat am Metal"	6:33

== Personnel ==
- Christof Kather – drums, vocals
- Klaus Nicodem – guitar
- Robert Nowak – guitar
- Marco Bachmann – bass
- Markus "Bony" Hoff – vocals
- Martin Freund – vocals
- René Hauffe – guitar
