= Visceral Disgorge =

American death metal band

- Origin: Baltimore, Maryland, U.S.
- Genres: Brutal Slamming Death metal
- Years active: 2007–present
- Labels: Agonia, Amputated Vein, Unholy Anarchy
- Members: Travis Werner; Steve Miles; Karl Schmidt; Charlie Marvel
- Past members: Billy Denne; Dan Harris; Steve Rosenzweig; Eric Vieraitis; Eric Little; Randy Henry; Christian Monkin

Visceral Disgorge is an American death metal band from Baltimore that was formed in 2007.

== History ==
Visceral Disgorge originally formed in early 2007, coming from the remains of a former death metal band known as Eaten Alive. Wanting to go in a heavier direction than their previous band, Travis Werner and Eric Vieraitis began forming the foundation of what would later be known as Visceral Disgorge. In late 2009, Visceral Disgorge recorded a single demo track which received the attention that resulted in the signing of a record deal with Japanese death metal label Amputated Vein Records. Soon after, they prepared for the worldwide release in 2011 of their debut album Ingesting Putridity, which showcased the graphic illustrations of Japanese artist Toshihiro Egawa for the album artwork. The album received positive feedback from several sources.

Shortly following the release of Ingesting Putridity, Visceral Disgorge began making appearances at metal festivals throughout the United States and abroad. These festivals included Maryland Deathfest (IX, XIV), Netherlands Deathfest, Frankfurt Deathfest, Las Vegas Deathfest IV, Puerto Rico Metal Demolition Fest, New York Deathfest, New Jersey Deathfest, Philadelphia Infest, Delaware Deathfest, Brutality reigns fest, Louisvillie Death Fest, and DeLand Metal Fest among other festivals.

In 2014, guitarist Steve Rosenzweig died forcing the band to find the replacement Charlie Marvel. The band released a memorial music video in his memory for their song "Necrocoprophagia".

== Musical style ==
The band performs a style of brutal death metal which uses frequent slam riffs and guttural growl vocals. They use down tuned guitars often incorporating fast and complex guitar riffing as well as slam riffs and breakdowns, alongside an onslaught of blast beats and double bass drumming, as well as a sophisticated and technical sense of song writing. The band's lyrics and imagery primarily focus on gratuitous graphic violence which is highly influenced by various works of horror fiction, science fiction, and horror films.

== Members ==
=== Current members ===
- Bill Denne – drums (2007–2009 & 2013–May 2025)
- Travis Werner – vocals (2007–present)
- Steve Miles – guitar (2013–present)
- Charlie Marvel – guitar (2015–present)
- Karl Schmidt – bass guitar (2024–present)

=== Former members ===
- Steve Rosenzweig – guitar (2007–2014; died 2014)
- Eric Vieraitis – guitar (2007–2013)
- Dan Harris – drums (2010–2013)
- Eric Little – bass guitar (2015–2019)
- Randy Henry – bass guitar (2013–2015 & 2019–2022)
- Christian Moken– bass guitar (2022–2024)

== Discography ==
- Ingesting Putridity (2011), Amputated Vein
- Slithering Evisceration (2019), Agonia
