= Conan (band) =

British doom metal band

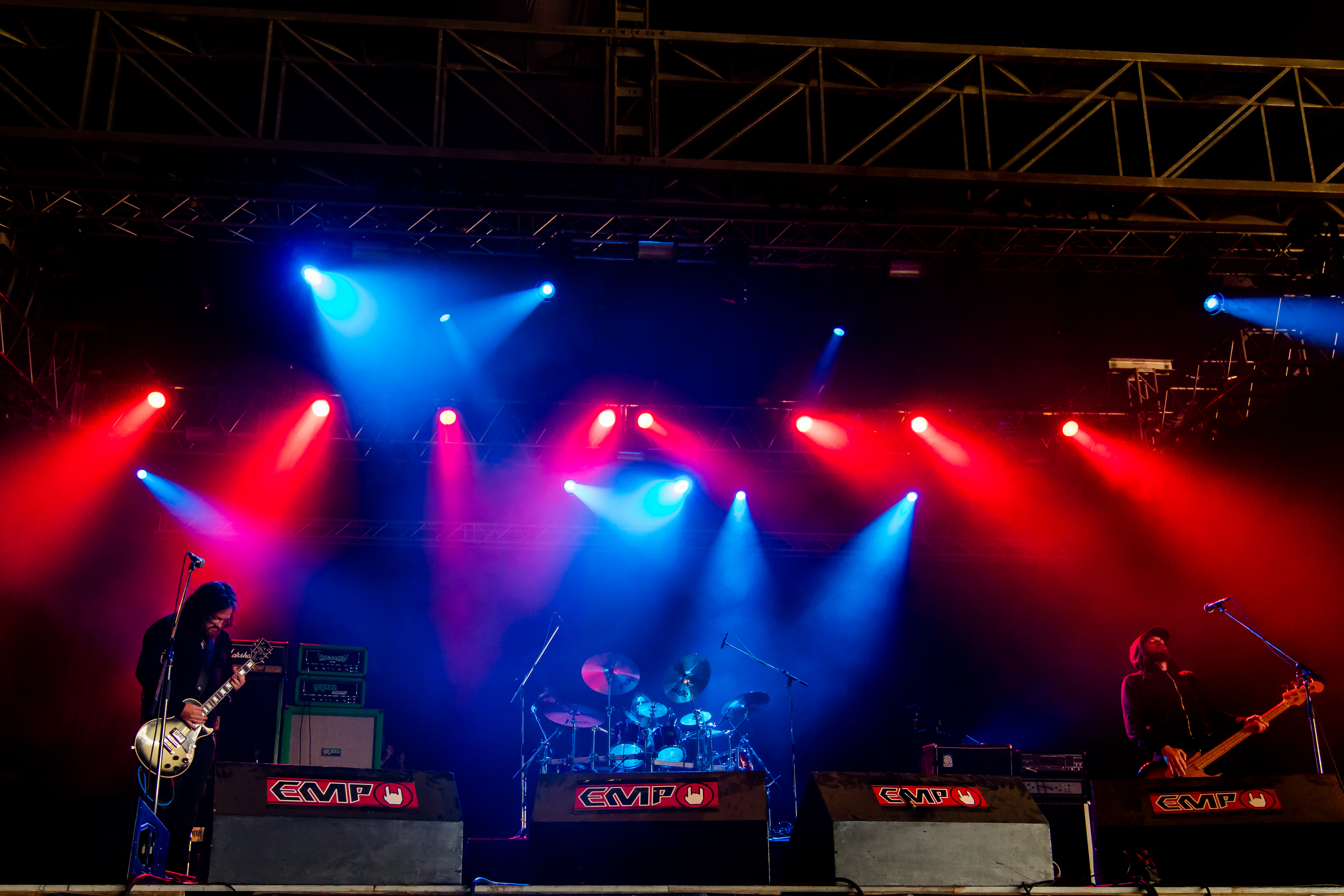
- Conan at Summer Breeze 2016

Background information
- Origin: Liverpool, England
- Genres: Doom metal, sludge metal, stoner metal
- Years active: 2006–present
- Labels: Throne, Burning World, Napalm, Black Bow Records
- Members: Jon Davis; David Ryley; Johnny King
- Past members: Chris Fielding; Richie Grundy; Paul O'Neill; John McNulty; David Perry; Phil Coumbe; Rich Lewis
- Website: hailconan.com

Conan are a British doom/sludge metal band from Liverpool whose style is characterised by a heavily distorted and downtuned sound. It has been described as "caveman battle doom".

== History ==
Conan was founded as a two-piece by guitarist/singer Jon Davis in 2006, with Richie Grundy on drums. Following the departure of Grundy, Paul O'Neil took over on drums before the band went on nearly a year-long hiatus. Once activity resumed, the band added the position of bass guitarist and went through several musicians before Chris Fielding joined in 2013. Longtime drummer O'Neil, who had performed on both of the band's full-length albums, was replaced by Rich Lewis in 2014. On 31 March 2015, the band announced that they would be headlining a US tour with support Samothrace and Mantar. The tour consisted of 11 dates, including Psycho California and Maryland Deathfest.

In June 2015, the band announced they had begun the writing process for a new album. On 15 October, the band announced their third full-length album would be titled Revengeance, as well as a release date of 29 January 2016. On 3 August 2017, the band announced on their Facebook page the departure of Lewis.

The fifth Conan studio album entitled Existential Void Guardian was released on 14 September 2018. The band's sixth album, Evidence of Immortality, was released on 19 August 2022.

In 2023 Chris Fielding announced his departure from the band and David Ryley, bassist of Ungraven and former bassist of Fudge Tunnel, joined the band.

The seventh album Violence Dimension was released on the 25 April 2025. The band toured around Europe late in 2025 and through the first months of 2026. Right after they finished the European tour, they traveled to the US late in March to start the North American leg of the Violence Dimension Tour.

== Members ==
Current members

- Jon Davis – vocals, guitar (2006–2008, 2009–present)
- Johnny King – drums (2017–present)
- David Ryley – bass (2023–present)

Former members

- Richie Grundy – drums (2006)
- Paul O'Neil – drums (2007–2008, 2009–2014)
- John McNulty – bass (2009–2010)
- Dave Perry – bass, vocals, synth (2011)
- Phil Coumbe – bass, vocals (2011–2013)
- Chris Fielding – bass (2013–2023)
- Rich Lewis – drums (2014–2017)

== Discography ==
=== Albums ===
- Monnos CD/LP (2012, Burning World Records)
- Blood Eagle CD/LP (2014, Napalm Records)
- Revengeance CD/LP (2016, Napalm Records)
- Existential Void Guardian (2018, Napalm Records)
- Evidence of Immortality (2022, Napalm Records)
- Violence Dimension (2025, Heavy Psych Records)

=== EPs ===
- Battle in the Swamp (2007 demo)
- Horseback Battle Hammer (2010, Throne Records)
- DIY Series, Issue 1 10" (2024, Black Bow Records)
- DIY Series, Issue 2 (2026, Black Bow Records)

=== Split EPs ===
- Conan vs. Slomatics (2011, Head of Crom Records)
- Conan / Bongripper (2013, Holy Roar Records)

=== Live albums ===
- Mount Wrath: Live at Roadburn 2012 (2013, Roadburn Records)
- Live at Bannermans (2015, Black Bow Records)
- Live at Freak Valley (2021, Napalm Records)

=== Compilations ===
- Man is Myth (2017, Napalm Records)
