= MetalSucks =

Heavy metal music-themed news website

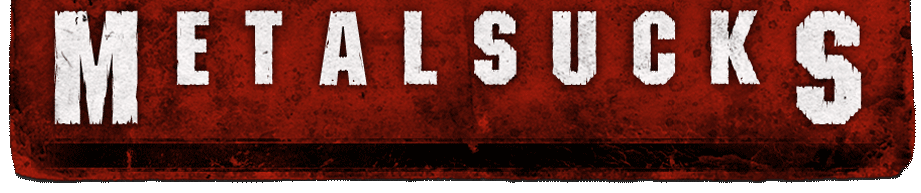
- Company type: Privately held company
- Website type: Online newspaper
- Available in: English
- Founded: Brooklyn, New York City, U.S. December 2006; 19 years ago
- Headquarters: Brooklyn, New York City, U.S.
- Area served: Worldwide
- Founders: Axl Rosenberg (Matt Goldenberg); Vince Neilstein (Ben Umanov)
- Website: www.metalsucks.net
- Registration: Optional
- Launched: 2006; 20 years ago
- Current status: Active

MetalSucks is an American heavy metal music-themed news website. The site features reviews, interviews, information on the latest metal releases and blog-like posts from the writers, most notably Vince Neilstein and Axl Rosenberg.

== History ==
The website was founded in December 2006 by authors Ben Umanov and Matthew Goldenberg. In a 2012 interview to Invisible Oranges Vince Neilstein (Umanov's pen name) recalled that he and Axl Rosenberg (Goldenberg's pen name) have been friends since childhood, and the blog started as a WordPress site.

In, 2009, MetalSucks had leaked the album Axe to Fall by Converge onto the internet prior two weeks before its official release, and had assumed responsibility for doing so.

=== The Metal Suckfest ===
In November 2011, MetalSucks organized The Metal Suckfest, a two-day music festival in Gramercy Theatre. It was the first U.S. metal festival organized and co-sponsored by a metal blog.

Municipal Waste and Cynic were announced as headliners, with 18 additional artists including Magrudergrind, This Is Hell, All Pigs Must Die, Obscura and other bands performing.

=== Manifesto ===
In 2016, MetalSucks published the MetalSucks Manifesto, a declaration released in November in response to Donald Trump's presidential victory that reaffirmed their commitment to supporting artists who share the site's values and to opposing racism, sexism, and other forms of hate within the metal community.

In 2022, MetalSucks was acquired by entertainment company The Orchard, a subsidiary of Sony. On April 29, 2026, Sony reportedly laid off the entire staff.
