= Vermis (album) =

Studio album by Ulcerate
- Released: September 13, 2013
- Recorded: March – April 2013
- Studio: MCA Studios, Auckland, New Zealand
- Genre: Technical death metal, post-metal
- Length: 54:18
- Label: Relapse Records
- Producer: Jamie Saint Merat

Ulcerate chronology
| The Destroyers of All (2011) | Vermis (2013) | Shrines of Paralysis (2016) |

Vermis is the fourth studio album by New Zealand technical death metal band Ulcerate. It was released on September 13, 2013, through Relapse Records to positive reviews. It is the first album by Ulcerate to be released through Relapse.

== Musical style and writing ==
While the band has been noted for its use of dissonance, drummer Jamie Saint Merat countered that "dissonance for dissonance’s sake is extremely fatiguing". Given this, Merat said that Vermis uses melody in a "weird and unsettling" way to create "a tangible amount of tension and release". Merat further noted that the band made a conscious decision with Vermis to bring back "a level of unpredictability we've always had in the past" due to the feeling that the previous album, The Destroyers of All, "came out a little too fluid on the whole".

According to Merat, Vermis uses the metaphor of invertebrate animal species to explore "the over-arching theme of spinelessness [and] oppression". Merat explained that different forms of oppression are explored on the album, including:

The helplessness and suffering of those oppressed; the barbarism of the oppressors; the ways and means of oppression, particularly dogma, power and manipulation; those unaware or ignorant of the oppressed and their own relative luxury; those aware, but rendered mute through fear and spinelessness; and the impact and collateral of these attitudes on the world around us.

== Critical reception ==
Professional ratings
Review scores
| Source | Rating |
|---|---|
| About.com | 4/5 stars |
| Exclaim! | 8/10 |
| New Noise Magazine | 4/5 stars |
| Pitchfork | 7.7/10 |
| Popmatters | 9/10 |

Vermis has received positive reviews from critics. Several reviewers noted that Ulcerate's approach posed a challenge for casual listeners, with Greg Pratt, Dave Schalek, and Brandon Ringo cautioning that Vermis placed exceptional demands upon its audience prior to disclosing its positive features. Pitchfork's Andy O'Connor cited the album's use of technicality favourably, remarking that "as complicated as the music may be, Vermis is an album of songs, not exercises. Technicality is used to convey madness; it's not the ultimate goal in and of itself". Praising the band's "distinctive voice", Popmatters' Craig Hayes observed that Vermis extended the band's "continually refined" creative trajectory by "bringing more artful sculpturing to its downtuned dissonance and complex time signatures, and setting that against a backdrop of often droning and industrial textures. The band’s work has evolved to become steadily more nerve-shredding and formidable, with the usual riff-based shreds of death metal mutilated into a seething and polychromatic canvas of avant-garde atmospherics".

== Track listing ==
All songs written by Michael Hoggard and Jamie Saint Merat. All lyrics by Paul Kelland.

| No. | Title | Length |
|---|---|---|
| 1. | "Odium" | 2:44 |
| 2. | "Vermis" | 5:58 |
| 3. | "Clutching Revulsion" | 7:04 |
| 4. | "Weight of Emptiness" | 7:42 |
| 5. | "Confronting Entropy" | 6:30 |
| 6. | "Fall to Opprobrium" | 2:23 |
| 7. | "The Imperious Weak" | 7:23 |
| 8. | "Cessation" | 7:01 |
| 9. | "Await Rescission" | 7:31 |
| Total length: | | 54:18 |

== Personnel ==
Personnel adapted from liner notes.

Ulcerate

- Paul Kelland – vocals, bass, lyrics
- Michael Hoggard – guitars
- Jamie Saint Merat – drums

Production and art

- Michael Hoggard - audio engineering
- Alan Douches - mastering
- Jamie Saint Merat - art, layout, and photography, mixing, audio engineering
