= Stare Into Death and Be Still =

Stare into Death and Be Still

Studio album by Ulcerate
- Released: April 24, 2020
- Genres: Technical death metal; post-metal
- Length: 58:23
- Language: English
- Label: Debemur Morti

Ulcerate chronology
Shrines of Paralysis (2016)	Stare into Death and Be Still (2020)	Cutting the Throat of God (2024)

Stare into Death and Be Still is the sixth studio album by New Zealand technical death metal band Ulcerate. The album was officially announced on 2 March 2020, and was released on 24 April 2020. This album is also the first to be released on Debemur Morti Productions.

== Release ==
The album was first announced on 2 March 2020 with an announced date of 24 April of that same year, with the title track being released for purchase and streaming.

== Critical reception ==
Professional ratings
Review scores
Source	Rating
Blabbermouth	8/10 stars
Distorted Sound	10/10 stars
Sonic Perspectives	8.5/10 stars
Sputnikmusic	5/5 stars

Jay Gorania of Blabbermouth called the album "dissonant and discombobulating" and that it "isn't an easy release to consume, but it's rewarding on the deepest and most profound levels for those who are patient enough to allow ULCERATE to work their magic." James Weaver of Distorted Sound Magazine praised the album as a "masterpiece of extremity" and "the strongest album the band have created and is one of the strongest albums to grace extreme metal this year." Langdon Hickman from Invisible Oranges praised the album for creating "deeply emotional core" and that the band were "very deliberate in their deployment of techniques from both technical death metal and post-metal." He concluded the article by stating the album was "a must-listen, not just for fans of the subgenre but fans of heavy metal in general."

=== Accolades ===
Publication	Accolade	Rank	Ref.
Treblezine	Top 25 Metal Albums of 2020	21	
Stereogum	The 10 Best Metal Albums of 2020	8	
Consequence	Top 30 Metal + Hard Rock Albums of 2020	13	

== Track listing ==
All lyrics are written by Paul Kelland; all music is composed by Michael Hoggard and Jamie Saint Merat.

No.	Title	Length
1.	"The Lifeless Advance"	7:01
2.	"Exhale the Ash"	6:19
3.	"Stare into Death and Be Still"	8:24
4.	"There is No Horizon"	7:02
5.	"Inversion"	7:05
6.	"Visceral Ends"	5:40
7.	"Drawn into the Next Void"	8:37
8.	"Dissolved Orders"	8:15

== Personnel ==
- Paul Kelland – vocals, bass guitar
- Michael Hoggard – guitars
- Jamie Saint Merat – drums
