= Starving the Vultures =

Studio album by Circle of Dead Children
- Released: 1999
- Recorded: January–May 1999
- Studio: +/- Studios (Pittsburgh, Pennsylvania)
- Genre: Deathgrind
- Length: 24:18
- Label: Willowtip
- Producer: Circle of Dead Children

Circle of Dead Children chronology
Circle of Dead Children (1998)	Starving the Vultures (1999)	Exotic Sense Decay (2000)

Starving the Vultures is the debut album by American brutal death/grindcore band Circle of Dead Children.

== Track listing ==
1. "Ursa Major" – 0:45
2. "Eldorado" - 3:14
3. "Where the Hive Hangs" – 3:10
4. "Sunday's Agenda?" – 2:06
5. "Tranquilizer" – 0:54
6. "Four Walls and a Feeling" – 2:39
7. "When Silence Glorifies Pestilence (Faint)" – 0:52
8. "Sons of Nameless" – 1:18
9. "Doom Farmer" – 0:28
10. "Calm" – 2:37
11. "Freethinkers Fight Song" – 1:31
12. "Return to Water" – 2:29
13. "Heidi's Arrow" – 1:30
14. "Imprint This Stake with Your Name" – 0:45

== Personnel ==
- Joe Horvath – vocals
- Jon Kubacka – guitar
- Jason Andrews – guitar
- Jon Miciolek – drums
- Dave Good – bass
