= Human Harvest (album) =

Studio album by Circle of Dead Children
- Released: April 29, 2003
- Recorded: 2003
- Genre: Deathgrind
- Length: 32:01
- Label: Martyr Music Group
- Producer: Steve Austin

Circle of Dead Children chronology
The Genocide Machine (2001)	Human Harvest (2003)	Zero Comfort Margin (2005)

Professional ratings
Review scores
Source	Rating
AllMusic	3/5 stars
Alternative Press	3/5

Human Harvest is the third album by Circle of Dead Children released in 2003 through Martyr Music Group. The opening track "A Family Tree to Hang From" begins with a sound clip from David Lynch's film Mulholland Drive. There is also bonus track 9:07 into "Alkaline".

== Track listing ==
1. "A Family Tree to Hang From"
2. "We Wear the Gimp Mask"
3. "Salt Rock Eyes"
4. "Bring Her a Mushroom Cloud Pt. 1"
5. "No Tolerance for Silence"
6. "Destiny of the Slug"
7. "Sleepwalker"
8. "Harvest at Dawn (Enter Fertility)"
9. "Corsage of Fresh Meat and Rotted Pride"
10. "Oak and Iron"
11. "Mother Pig"
12. "Rocket"
13. "King Cobra Vs Queen Bee"
14. "Buzzard Blizzard"
15. "White Trash Headache"
16. "Shadow of the Narcissist"
17. "Bring Her a Mushroom Cloud Pt. 2"
18. "My Supernatural (Bell Ring Slowly)"
19. "Alkaline"
