= Circle of Dead Children =

American deathgrind band

- Origin: Pittsburgh, Pennsylvania, U.S.
- Genres: Death metal, grindcore
- Years active: 1998–present
- Label: Willowtip Records
- Members: Joe Horvath; Brooks; Drew Haritan; Matt Francis

Circle of Dead Children is an American deathgrind band formed in Pittsburgh, Pennsylvania in 1998. After the release of a self-titled demo the same year they formed, Circle of Dead Children signed with Willowtip Records to release their debut full-length album, Starving the Vultures, which comprised the demo tracks as well as several new ones.

After leaving Willowtip, Circle of Dead Children signed to numerous other labels including S.O.A. Records, Robodog Records (now called Robotic Empire), Necropolis Records, Deathvomit Records, Martyr Music Group, Earache Records, Displeased Records and Candlelight Records. Since the group's debut, the band has undergone numerous lineup changes. The only remaining original and consistent member is Joe Horvath.

== History ==
=== Formation and early history ===
Circle of Dead Children formed after Joe Horvath and Jason Andrews's previous band, .blackwel., had broken up. They joined with John Kubacka, David Good and Jon Miciolek, who had been playing in various punk bands at the time. Following their tenth practice, they recorded and self-financed their first and only demo cassette, which was self-titled. They made one hundred copies for distribution, and it sold out at their first two live shows. The demo contained four tracks and had a total playing time of 5:45. The band focused on playing around the Pittsburgh area for its first couple of years. Horvath committed self-battery and bloodshed in each live concert during the first couple of years for shock value.

=== Starving the Vultures ===
Shortly after releasing a demo cassette, Circle of Dead Children signed a deal with Willowtip Records and developed their first album, Starving the Vultures. It contained the four tracks from their demo cassette and ten more songs. They recorded this release with Todd Doehring at a makeshift studio inside of a now demolished warehouse building, called Plus/Minus Studios, Pittsburgh, Pennsylvania. Doehring had little experience recording death-metal at the time, having mostly recorded/produced jazz and avant-garde groups/bands. The album was released in 1998, on compact disc through Willowtip Records. A limited edition vinyl LP version with a pressing of 500 was released through Italian record label, S.O.A. Records, and has long since been sold out. The album received positive reviews, praising the band's approach to extreme metal. The fourteen tracks have a total playing time of 24:18.

=== Exotic Sense Decay ===
In 1999, Circle of Dead Children were approached to do a split 10" record with Ontario, Canada metal band, Maharahj. Within two and half weeks, the band had written and recorded seven tracks for the proposed release. It was recorded at Plus/Minus Studios, in Pittsburgh, PA, with Todd Doehring. The band recorded with the lights off and a few tea candles lit and scattered through the warehouse. After several setbacks with the other band and proposed record label, Circle of Dead Children released the songs as a CD-EP on Willowtip Records. They also released the songs on a limited-edition 7" picture disc record, on Robodog Records, with a pressing of 500 copies. Each side of the picture disc featured unique artwork. Horvath painted the art that became the album cover for this release, after having difficulty finding suitable artwork that they could commission. He titled the piece "The Cost of Impatience". Following the release of 'Exotic Sense Decay', the band parted ways with original bass player David Good. This release featured seven tracks and a playing time of 12:19.

=== The Genocide Machine ===
Following the success of 'Starving the Vultures' and 'Exotic Sense Decay', several larger metal labels offered Circle of Dead Children record deals. After turning down several offers, the band signed a with Necropolis Records' newly formed subsidiary label, Deathvomit Records. They recruited bassist Alf Kooser. The release was the band's last to be recorded at the warehouse with Plus/Minus Studios. It was recorded in the dead of winter while temperatures were in the single digits outside and not much higher inside the warehouse where Plus/Minus Studios was located. The album contained seventeen tracks, four of which were electronic, industrial-influenced noise tracks, two of which featured Horvath's vocals. The closing track, "Ctrl * Alt * Delete", is a slow track highlighted by a spoken-word explanation of what the band views as "the genocide machine". The artwork was done by Michael and Mark Riddick.

'The Genocide Machine' sold out of its 3,500 pressing in the first month of its release and received praise and accolades, as well as ranking No. 9 in the College Music Journal hard rock charts at one point, the highest any Necropolis Records bands had garnered at that time. Circle of Dead Children embarked on a tour with California grindcore pioneers, Phobia, in support of 'The Genocide Machine'. Circle of Dead Children's relationship with Necropolis Records soured after the label was unable to recoup the band for the recording costs. Circle of Dead Children terminated their contract with Necropolis Records / Deathvomit Records and ordered a cease and desist upon further pressings of 'the Genocide Machine'. Bootleg copies of 'The Genocide Machine' have been discovered throughout the world.

Willowtip Records released 'The Genocide Machine' on a limited-edition vinyl LP that was packaged in a silver static-bag. There was a pressing of 1000, with 250 hand-numbered copies available on transparent blue vinyl with different but complementary artwork. This album has a playing time of 28:44.

Following the release, the band parted ways with guitarist Jon Kubacka, bassist Alf Kooser, and original drummer Jon Miciolek.

=== Human Harvest ===
In 2003, Circle of Dead Children released 'Human Harvest' with only three members. This was their first and only release featuring no bass player. 'Human Harvest' was recorded at Austin Enterprise, in Massachusetts, with Steve Austin, founder of Today is the Day. Circle of Dead Children agreed to a one-off licensing deal for 'Human Harvest' with Martyr Music Group in the Americas, and Displeased Records for Europe and Asia. Displeased Records released a limited-edition vinyl version of 'Human Harvest' featuring different but complementary artwork. The album received positive reviews and press, often citing the level of brutality and intensity in the music and vocals. Artwork was done by Mark Riddick. The final track, "Alkaline", includes a bonus track at the 9:07 mark, which is part of a vocal segment from the song "Mother Pig", slowed down. This album features 19 tracks and a playing time of 32:01.

=== Zero Comfort Margin ===
Released in 2005, 'Zero Comfort Margin' followed a hiatus of over one year in which the band added former Sadis Euphoria drummer Mike Bartek and former Sadis Euphoria guitarist Drew Haritan to the lineup. Haritan played bass guitar. The band was invited by engineer/producer Steve Austin to his home to record what was intended to be demo tracks, prior to their new drummer having to undergo wrist surgery that would set the band back while he recovered. In a recording session, which Austin told Metal Maniacs Magazine that he barely recalled, the band recorded 15 songs. They released the songs as an EP through Willowtip Records in the Americas and Earache Records for Europe and Asia. A limited-edition gatefold vinyl version was released by Arclight Communications with a pressing of 500. It featured complementary artwork and black and gold or white and gold splattered vinyl to honor the sporting colors associated with Pittsburgh, Pennsylvania. 'Zero Comfort Margin' featured the only cover song the band has recorded to date, a cover of "Playdumb" by local 1990s grindcore band Hideous Mangleus. Artwork was completed by Mark Riddick. This release features 15 tracks, four of which are electronic noise tracks, and has a playing time of 20:19.

Following the release, CODC parted ways with drummer Mike Bartek.

=== Psalm of the Grand Destroyer ===
Prior to Bartek's departure in 2006, Circle of Dead Children had written twelve new songs, but had never recorded them. The band again found themselves in an extended hiatus while they looked for a new drummer. Matt Francis, from Binghamton, New York, was brought into the band in 2007 and eventually moved to Pittsburgh to be closer in 2008. In 2009, the band recorded the music for the twelve songs they had previously written plus three additional new songs at Mr. Smalls Studio, in Pittsburgh, PA. Due to serious illness and other setbacks, Joe Horvath did not record his vocals for the album until several months later. 'Psalm of the Grand Destroyer' was mastered and produced by Scott Hull at Visceral Sound, based in Bethesda, Maryland, and released by Willowtip Records in the Americas and Candlelight Records for Europe and Asia in June 2010. Willowtip Records also released a limited-edition vinyl LP pressing of 500 copies, with 250 being on gold splattered wax and 250 on red wax. It featured alternate, but complementary, artwork done by Alex Eckman-Lawn. This release features fifteen tracks and has a total playing time of 31:47.

== Style ==
The band generally play a varied style of extreme metal, combining grindcore, death metal and crust punk with black metal and doom overtones and atmospheres appearing in the writing at times. Song writing utilizes some traditional grindcore and deathgrind format in writing very short songs: six seconds, for instance, for the track "White Trash Headache". Other tracks develop into much longer pieces: 5 minutes and 45 seconds, for instance, for the track, "Germinate the Reaper Seed". Metal Maniacs Magazine, in 2005, published an article written by Wade Gosselin, where two "modern grind acts" were chosen who he believed had pushed the bar the highest in the modern grindcore scene. The article was titled "Suffocate Mediocrity / Expanding Grindcore" and featured "Circle of Dead Children" and "Antigama".

== Members ==
Current members

- Joe Horvath – vocals (1998–present)
- Drew Haritan – bass (2005–2011), guitars (2011–present)
- Brooks – bass (2011–present)
- Matt Francis – drums (2007–present)

Former members

- Jason Andrews – guitars (1998–2011)
- Dave Good – bass (1998–2000)
- Jon Kubacka – guitars (1998–2001)
- Jon Miciolek – drums (1998–2001)
- Alf Kooser – bass (2000–2002, 2004)
- Mike Bartek – drums (2004–2006)

Timeline

== Discography ==
- 1998 – Circle of Dead Children demo
- 1999 – Starving the Vultures (CD: Willowtip Records, LP: S.O.A. Records)
- 2000 – Exotic Sense Decay (CD EP: Willowtip Records, 7" picture disc EP: Robotic Empire)
- 2001 – The Genocide Machine (CD: Deathvomit Records, LP: Willowtip Records)
- 2003 – Human Harvest (CD: Americas: Martyr Music Group, Europe and World: Displeased Records, LP: Displeased Records)
- 2005 – Zero Comfort Margin (CD : Earache Records, 10" : Arclight Commincatons)
- 2010 – Psalm of the Grand Destroyer (CD: Willowtip Records)
