= Retaliation (band) =

- Also known as: Invalid Injection
- Origin: Lower Franconia, Bavaria, Germany
- Genres: Death metal
- Years active: 2005–present
- Label: Unique Leader Records
- Members: Johannes Schwarzkopf; Christian Schlosser; Dennis Schneider; Florian Wehner; Heiko Heckner; Marc Schuhmann
- Past members: Marco Weißenberger; Julian Welsch; Stefan Lammer; Sebastian Pschirrer; Jürgen Köhler; Nasar Skripitskij; Sven Lutz
- Website: www.retaliationdeath.de

Retaliation (formerly known as Invalid Injection) is a German death metal band from Lower Franconia, Bavaria, formed in 2005. The band was founded by Julian Welsch and Sven Lutz under its former name, before renaming and re-branding in 2006.

The band's debut album, Seven, was released in August 2010.

== Members ==
- Johannes Schwarzkopf – vocals (?–present)
- Christian Schlosser – vocals (?–present)
- Heiko Heckner – bass (?–present)
- Dennis Schneider – guitar (2008–present)
- Florian Wehner – guitar (2011–present)
- Marc Schuhmann – drums (2008–09, 2009–present)

== Discography ==
=== Albums ===
- Seven (full-length, 2010), Unique Leader Records

=== Demos/EP ===
- Enticing (EP, 2008), Rising Nemesis Records
