= Wombbath =

Swedish death metal band

Wombbath is a Swedish death metal band. Initially known for performing an "old-school" style of death metal, they later incorporated experimental and progressive elements into their music. Like other Swedish death metal bands they are known for using the "chainsaw" guitar tone. Their debut album Internal Caustic Torments is considered a "cult classic" by Decibel. Their most recent album was Choirs of the Fallen, released in 2020. Members of the band went on to join international death metal band Heads for the Dead.
