= Bongripper =

American doom metal band

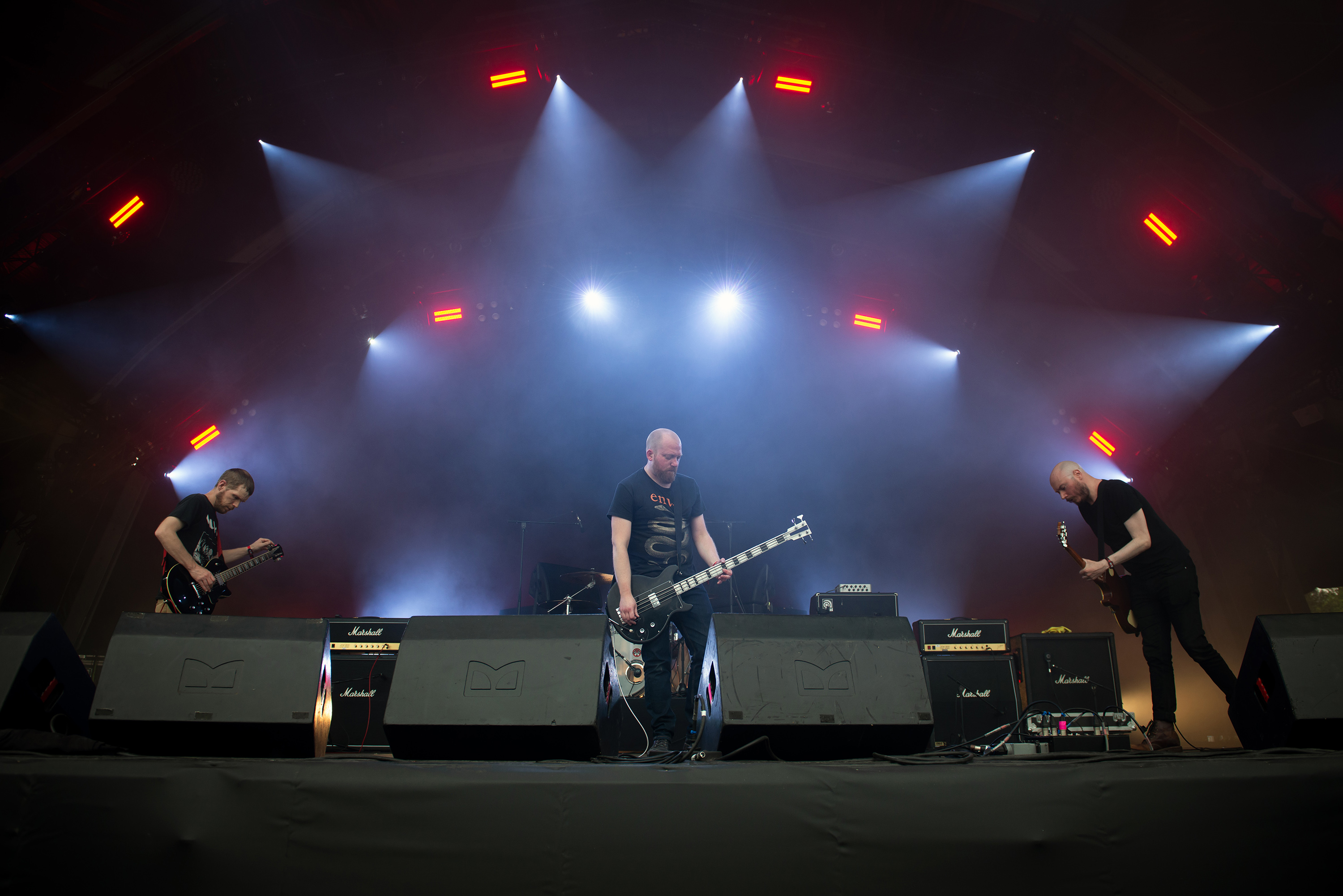
- Bongripper at Hellfest 2023

Background information
- Origin: Chicago, Illinois, U.S.
- Genres: Doom metal; stoner metal; drone metal
- Years active: 2005–present
- Label: Great Barrier
- Members: Ronald Petzke; Daniel O'Connor; Nick Dellacroce; Dennis Pleckham
- Website: bongripper.com

Bongripper is an American instrumental doom metal band from Chicago, formed in 2005.

== History ==
In 2006, Bongripper self-released their first album, titled The Great Barrier Reefer, which is composed of a single 79-minute piece created with the intention of being longer than Sleep's Dopesmoker. In 2007, the band self-released their second studio album titled Hippie Killer and their third studio album titled Heroin. In 2008, the band self-released its fourth studio album titled Hate Ashbury and a collaborative EP with Winters in Osaka. This was followed by the band self-releasing their album Satan Worshipping Doom in 2010.

In 2013, Bongripper released two split EPs via Great Barrier Records; one with Hate and another with Conan.

In 2014, the band released their sixth studio album, titled Miserable, via Great Barrier Records.

Their seventh album, titled Terminal, was released on July 6, 2018.

In May 2020, the band released Glaciers, an EP recorded in 2009 and left unreleased for 11 years.

== Members ==
- Ronald Petzke – bass
- Daniel O'Connor – drums
- Nick Dellacroce – guitars
- Dennis Pleckham – guitars

== Discography ==
=== Studio albums ===
- The Great Barrier Reefer (2006, self-released)
- Hippie Killer (2007, self-released)
- Heroin (2007, self-released)
- Hate Ashbury (2008, self-released)
- Satan Worshipping Doom (2010, self-released)
- Miserable (2014, The Great Barrier Records)
- Terminal (2018, The Great Barrier Records)
- Empty (2024, The Great Barrier Records)

=== EPs and splits ===
- Meat Ditch (split with Winters in Osaka) (2008, self-released)
- Sex Tape / Snuff Film (2011, Great Barrier Records)
- Bongripper/Hate (2013, Great Barrier Records)
- Bongripper/Conan (2013, Holy Roar Records)
- Glaciers (2020, self-released)
