= Inhume (band) =

Dutch deathgrind band

- Origin: Limburg, Netherlands
- Genres: Death metal, grindcore
- Years active: 1994–present
- Members: Ben Janssen; Loek Peeters; Remco Verhees; Dorus van Ooij
- Past members: Roel Sanders; Johan "Driek" Dirkcx; Harold Gielen; Richard Ebisch; Eric de Windt; Michiel Adriaanse
- Website: www.inhume.nl

Inhume is a Dutch deathgrind band formed in 1994. The band has featured a revolving line-up throughout their career, with guitarist Ben Janssen and bassist Loek Peeters the sole constant members.

Releasing two demos and a split album in the 1990s, Inhume debuted in 2000 with the studio album Decomposing From Inside. The band's second album, In for the Kill, was released in 2003 by Osmose Productions.

== Members ==
=== Current lineup ===
- Loek Peeters – bass (1994–present)
- Ben Janssen – guitar (1995–present)
- Dorus van Ooij – vocals (2004–present)
- Wiebe Otten – drums (2022–present)

=== Former members ===
- Richard Ebisch – guitar (1994–1997)
- Johan Dirkx – vocals (1994–2003)
- Joost Silvrants – vocals (1994–2012)
- Roel Sanders – drums (1994–1997, 1999–2015, 2020–2021)
- Michiel Adriaans – drums (1997)
- Eric de Windt – drums (1998)
- Harold Gielen – guitar (1998–2007)
- Dennis Schreurs – vocals (2012–2022)
- Remco Verhees – drums (2015–2019)
- Michiel can der Plicht – drums (2019–2020)

== Discography ==
- (1995) Demo 1 demo
- (1996) Grind Your Mind Inhume / Suppository, live split tape (boerderij geleen)
- (1997) The Missing Limb, Demo 2 demo
- (1997) Enjoying The Violence? Inhume / Mundo De Mierda split tape
- (1998) Inhume / Blood Split 7" single Inhume / Blood
- (2000) Decomposing from Inside CD on Bones Brigade record label
- (2003) Dutch Assault split CD with Inhume, Suppository, S.M.E.S., Last Days of Humanity on Relapse Records record label
- (2003) In for the Kill CD & LP on Osmose Productions record label
- (2007) Chaos Dissection Order CD on Osmose Productions record label
- (2008) Inhume / Mumakil Split 7" single with Mumakil on Relapse Records Slimewave Series record label
- (2010) Moulding the Deformed

== Sources ==
- Metal Music Archives Biography
- An Interview with the Band
- 2010 Album Review in German
- 2007 Album Review in German
- 2018 Compilation Album Review
- Another Interview with the Band
- Inhume to Release 25th Anniversary Collection in December – Metal Jacket Magazine
- Allmusic biography
- Album Review – Allmusic
