= Phobia (band) =

American grindcore band

Phobia is a grindcore band from Orange County, California formed in 1990. The band has had a revolving lineup throughout its career. The band has toured with acts such as Exhumed, Cattle Decapitation, Deicide, Neurosis, Eyehategod, Impaled, Municipal Waste, Negative Approach, Lack Of Interest and Despise You.

== History ==
Phobia formed in 1990. Means of Existence was recorded in late 1997 in Orange County, California at For the Record. It was released on September 4, 1998.

== Musical style and influences ==
The band's style has been categorized as grindcore, crust punk, and punk rock. Alex Distefano of OC Weekly characterized the band as having a "fast punk inspired raw death metal sound." Lyrical themes explored by the band include left-wing politics and anarchism. According to Ian Chainey of Invisible Oranges: "Their grind is the same as it ever was: part punk, part metal, all pushed to the extreme." The musical style on Means of Existence has been categorized as death metal. Mike DaRonco of AllMusic said: "With songs that deal with government corruption, mankind's darkside and how evil corporations can be, Phobia want to be the ones to provide a big wake up for the masses and demand a overhaul within the system."

== Discography ==
- Means of Existence (1998)
- Remnants of Filth (2012)
- Lifeless God (2017)
- Generation Coward (2019)

== Band members ==
=== Original lineup ===
- Shane McLachlan – vocals
- Bruce Reeves – guitar
- Zach Southall – guitar
- Marco Soriano – drums
