= 2006 in heavy metal music =

This is a timeline documenting the events of heavy metal in the year 2006.

== Newly formed bands ==
- 1000mods
- Abandon All Ships
- Adelitas Way
- All Hail the Yeti
- Almah
- Altar of Plagues
- Amberian Dawn
- American Me
- Ancestors
- Ancient Bards
- Thy Art Is Murder
- Arven
- Asking Alexandria
- Beastwars
- Bison B.C.
- Black Breath
- Black Veil Brides
- Blood Ceremony
- Bloodsoaked
- Brymir
- Bury Tomorrow
- Cannabis Corpse
- Castevet
- Cauldron
- Cerebral Bore
- Circle of Contempt
- Coldworker
- Conan
- Daughtry
- Den Saakaldte
- Dethklok
- The Devil's Blood
- Diabulus in Musica
- Divide the Sea
- Dragged into Sunlight
- Elder
- Elysion
- Fen
- Flactorophia
- Forever Storm
- Ghost
- Graveyard
- Heaven & Hell
- Hail of Bullets
- Hellyeah
- I
- Ignominious Incarceration
- Nekrogoblikon
- Oceano
- Pathfinder
- Revocation
- Scars on Broadway
- Sister
- Skull Fist
- Stone Gods
- Success Will Write Apocalypse Across the Sky
- Terror Syndrome
- UnSun
- Van Canto
- Vola
- Whitechapel
- Winterfylleth

== Reformed bands ==
- Alcatrazz
- Alice in Chains
- Atheist
- Carnivore
- Emperor (for a few shows)
- Extreme (for a few shows)
- Immortal
- Myrkskog (for a one-off show. they are now defunct)
- Pitchshifter
- Sir Lord Baltimore

== Disbandments ==
- Burning My Abigail
- Cold (reformed in 2009)
- Crashdïet
- Dissection
- Fear Factory
- Full Scale (reformed in 2009)
- Limp Bizkit (on hiatus until 2009)
- Myrkskog
- Peccatum
- System of a Down (on hiatus)
- Terrorizer
- Winter Solstice

== Events ==
- Winter Solstice call it quits.
- Lordi wins the Eurovision Song Contest 2006 for Finland with the song Hard Rock Hallelujah in Athens, Greece.
- Slipknot goes on hiatus until 2008 while members work on their "side projects".
- Queen, Judas Priest, Def Leppard, and Kiss are the first bands inducted into the VH1 Rock Honors.
- Alice in Chains reunite with the Jar of Flies line-up and singer William DuVall replaces the late Layne Staley.
- Body Count releases their first album in nine years, Murder 4 Hire. The album features the band's new line-up: Bendrix (rhythm guitar), Vincent Price (bass), and O.T. (drums).
- Slayer releases their tenth studio album, Christ Illusion. The album entered the Billboard 200 at number 5—the band's highest U.S. chart position to date. The single Eyes of the Insane won the Best Metal Performance category at the 49th Grammy Awards.
- Extreme reunite for a second time – now with their "classic" original line-up – to do a small three-show reunion tour in New England.
- System of a Down goes on a long-term hiatus.
- Jesse Pintado of Terrorizer and formerly of Napalm Death passes away.
- Opeth drummer Martin Lopez officially and permanently leaves Opeth on May 12, 2006, due to illness and is replaced by Martin Axenrot.
- Metalocalypse airs on the Adult Swim network.
- Mercenary bassist/vocalist Henrik "Kral" Andersen leaves in March and is replaced by René Pedersen.
- Visions of Atlantis keyboardist Miro Holly quits and is replaced by Martin Harb.
- Chimaira drummer Andols Herrick rejoins the band (after leaving in 2003), forcing the departure of Kevin Talley.
- Tapio Wilska was fired from Finntroll due to personal differences.
- Iggor Cavalera leaves Sepultura due to "artistic incompatibility".

== Albums released ==
=== January ===
Day	Artist	Album
9	DragonForce	Inhuman Rampage
10	Bleeding Through	The Truth
10	Kayo Dot	Dowsing Anemone with Copper Tongue
20	Edguy	Rocket Ride
24	Demiricous	One (Hellbound)
24	Nocturnal Rites	Grand Illusion
24	P.O.D.	Testify
24	Sworn Enemy	The Beginning of the End
25	Norther	Till Death Unites Us
30	The Devin Townsend Band	Synchestra
30	Psycroptic	Symbols of Failure

=== February ===
Day	Artist	Album
3	In Flames	Come Clarity
5	Warbringer	One By One, The Wicked Fall (EP)
7	Hank Williams III	Straight to Hell
7	Akercocke	Words That Go Unspoken, Deeds That Go Undone
7	Decapitated	Organic Hallucinosis
7	Himsa	Hail Horror
7	Mastodon	Call of the Mastodon
14	Bullet for My Valentine	The Poison (USA Release)
14	The Sword	Age of Winters
15	Amorphis	Eclipse
15	Ensiferum	Dragonheads (EP)
17	Buckethead	The Elephant Man's Alarm Clock
20	Dismember	The God That Never Was
20	Raunchy	Death Pop Romance
21	Kataklysm	In the Arms of Devastation
21	Krisiun	AssassiNation
21	Wicked Wisdom	Wicked Wisdom
22	Kalmah	The Black Waltz
27	Darkthrone	The Cult Is Alive
27	Sadus	Out For Blood
27	Witchery	Don't Fear the Reaper

=== March ===
Day	Artist	Album
10	Lordi	The Arockalypse
13	Katatonia	The Great Cold Distance
13	Sepultura	Dante XXI
18	Machinae Supremacy	Redeemer
21	Cannibal Corpse	Kill
23	Drudkh	Blood in Our Wells
24	Oomph!	GlaubeLiebeTod
28	Atreyu	A Death-Grip on Yesterday
28	Phobia	Cruel
31	Queensrÿche	Operation: Mindcrime II
31	Lacuna Coil	Karmacode
31	Summoning	Oath Bound

=== April ===
Day	Artist	Album
3	The Slot	Две войны (Two wars)
4	Caliban	The Undying Darkness
4	Dead to Fall	The Phoenix Throne
4	Evergrey	Monday Morning Apocalypse
4	Sonata Arctica	For the Sake of Revenge (Live Album)
19	myGRAIN	Orbit Dance
21	OSI	Free
21	Scar Symmetry	Pitch Black Progress
25	Godsmack	IV
25	Moonspell	Memorial
25	Dissection	Reinkaos

=== May ===
Day	Artist	Album
2	Enslaved	Ruun
2	Ministry	Rio Grande Blood
2	Place of Skulls	The Black Is Never Far
2	Soil	True Self
2	Silent Civilian	Rebirth of the Temple
2	Tool	10,000 Days
8	Beyond Fear	Beyond Fear
9	Visceral Bleeding	Absorbing the Disarray
12	Sodom	Sodom
15	Architects	Nightmares
16	The Autumn Offering	Embrace the Gutter
16	Misery Index	Discordia
16	Russian Circles	Enter
16	Zyklon	Disintegrate
19	Communic	Waves of Visual Decay
22	Cataract	Kingdom
22	Necrophobic	Hrimthursum
23	Prototype	Continuum
26	Threat Signal	Under Reprisal
27	The Red Shore	Salvaging What's Left (EP)
29	Celtic Frost	Monotheist

=== June ===
Day	Artist	Album
1	Eluveitie	Spirit
1	Ghoul	Splatterthrash
6	As Blood Runs Black	Allegiance
6	Dance Club Massacre	Feast of the Blood Monsters
6	Red	End of Silence
7	Illdisposed	Burn Me Wicked
7	Rotten Sound	Consume to Contaminate
12	Celestiial	Desolate North
12	Disarmonia Mundi	Mind Tricks
13	The Acacia Strain	The Dead Walk
13	Satyricon	Now, Diabolical
13	Shadows Fall	Fallout from the War (Compilation)
13	Skinless	Trample the Weak, Hurdle the Dead
13	Three Days Grace	One-X
13	Zao	The Fear Is What Keeps Us Here
19	Anata	The Conductor's Departure
19	Carpathian Forest	Fuck You All!!!! Caput tuum in ano est
20	Underoath	Define the Great Line
26	SikTh	Death of a Dead Day
27	Cellador	Enter Deception
27	Metal Church	A Light in the Dark
27	Theatre of Tragedy	Storm

=== July ===
Day	Artist	Album
4	Spawn of Possession	Noctambulant
4	Flactorophia	Redemption of the Flesh (EP)
10	A Band Called Pain	Broken Dreams
10	Behemoth	Demonica (Box-set)
10	24-7 Spyz	Face the Day
11	All That Remains	The Fall of Ideals
11	Cattle Decapitation	Karma.Bloody.Karma
11	From a Second Story Window	Delenda
11	Strapping Young Lad	The New Black
21	Chrome Division	Doomsday Rock 'n Roll
25	Grave	As Rapture Comes
25	Voivod	Katorz
28	Sabaton	Attero Dominatus

=== August ===
Day	Artist	Album
1	Body Count	Murder 4 Hire
7	Antagonist A.D.	These Cities, Our Graves
8	Agalloch	Ashes Against the Grain
8	All Shall Perish	The Price of Existence
8	Breaking Benjamin	Phobia
8	Daughters	Hell Songs
8	Slayer	Christ Illusion
8	Unearth	III: In the Eyes of Fire
9	Insomnium	Above the Weeping World
10	Ihsahn	The Adversary
13	Maligno (MX)	Maligno
15	Coldseed	Completion Makes the Tragedy
17	Diablo Swing Orchestra	The Butcher's Ballroom
21	Mercenary	The Hours That Remain
22	Deicide	The Stench of Redemption
22	Gorod	Leading Vision
22	The Human Abstract	Nocturne
22	Lamb of God	Sacrament
22	Misery Signals	Mirrors
22	Terrorizer	Darker Days Ahead
22	Unexpect	In a Flesh Aquarium
22	Walls of Jericho	With Devils Amongst Us All
22	The Devil Wears Prada	Dear Love: A Beautiful Discord
25	Catamenia	Location: COLD
28	Iron Maiden	A Matter of Life and Death
29	Dream Theater	Score (CD/DVD)
29	Hatebreed	Supremacy
29	Motörhead	Kiss of Death

=== September ===
Day	Artist	Album
1	Blind Guardian	A Twist in the Myth
5	Alice in Chains	The Essential Alice in Chains (Compilation)
5	Heaven Shall Burn	Deaf to Our Prayers
5	Vader	Impressions in Blood
11	Mastodon	Blood Mountain
12	Black Label Society	Shot to Hell
12	Norma Jean	Redeemer
15	Buckethead	Crime Slunk Scene
15	Napalm Death	Smear Campaign
18	WarCry	La Quinta Esencia
19	Diecast	Internal Revolution
19	Dry Kill Logic	Of Vengeance and Violence
19	Light This City	Facing the Thousand
19	Mushroomhead	Savior Sorrow
19	Red Sparowes	Every Red Heart Shines Toward the Red Sun
19	Suffocation	Suffocation
22	Amon Amarth	With Oden on Our Side
22	Týr	Ragnarok
25	Into Eternity	The Scattering of Ashes
25	Rhapsody of Fire	Triumph or Agony

=== October ===
Day	Artist	Album
3	Evanescence	The Open Door
3	Quiet Riot	Rehab
3	Skillet	Comatose
9	My Dying Bride	A Line of Deathless Kings
10	Ahab	The Call of the Wretched Sea
10	Trivium	The Crusade
10	Zero Hour	Specs of Pictures Burnt Beyond
11	Solitude Aeturnus	Alone
13	Dream Evil	United
16	Sturmgeist	Über
16	Sylosis	Casting Shadows (EP)
16	Textures	Drawing Circles
17	Cradle of Filth	Thornography
17	It Dies Today	Sirens
18	HammerFall	Threshold
18	Solefald	Black for Death: An Icelandic Odyssey, Pt. 2
23	Angra	Aurora Consurgens
23	Krux	II
24	Beto Vázquez Infinity	Flying Towards the New Horizon
24	Paul Stanley	Live to Win
24	Skid Row	Revolutions per Minute
25	Europe	Secret Society
30	Borknagar	Origin
30	Bring Me The Horizon	Count Your Blessings
30	Melechesh	Emissaries
30	Kylesa	Time Will Fuse Its Worth
31	Deftones	Saturday Night Wrist
31	God Dethroned	The Toxic Touch
31	The Haunted	The Dead Eye
31	Isis	In the Absence of Truth
31	Martyr	Feeding the Abscess
31	Scars of Tomorrow	The Failure in Drowning

=== November ===
Day	Artist	Album
2	Decadence	3rd Stage of Decay
7	Arsis	United in Regret
13	Outworld	Outworld
14	The Faceless	Akeldama
17	Rammstein	Völkerball (CD/DVD)
17	Suidakra	Caledonia
21	Killswitch Engage	As Daylight Dies
22	Sentenced	Buried Alive (Live CD)

=== December ===
Day	Artist	Album
1	Oomph!	Delikatessen
6	This Ending	Inside the Machine
20	Blinded Colony	Bedtime Prayers

=== Release date unknown ===
Vomitorial Corpulence – Karrionic Hacktician

== See also ==
- 2006 in Swiss music

Preceded by 2005	Heavy Metal Timeline; 2006	Succeeded by 2007
