= Metamorphosis (Mercenary album) =

Studio album by Mercenary
- Released: 25 February 2011
- Genre: Melodic death metal
- Length: 48:40
- Label: Napalm, Prosthetic

Mercenary chronology
Architect of Lies (2008)	Metamorphosis (2011)	Through Our Darkest Days (2013)

Alternative cover
- US version cover

Metamorphosis is the sixth studio album by Danish melodic death metal band Mercenary. It features a radically different line-up than on previous releases. It is the first album since First Breath not to feature the Sandager brothers and the first without Mike Park on drums since 11 Dreams. It is Morten Løwe's debut on drums.

Metamorphosis was first released on 25 February 2011 by Napalm Records. The US version was released on 29 March 2011 by Prosthetic Records and included one bonus track. The song "The Follower" appeared on the band's YouTube channel on 23 December 2010. The song "In a River of Madness" was released for streaming on the band's Facebook page on 8 February 2011. The whole album was released for streaming on the Metal Hammer Germany website.

== Track listing ==
All tracks are written by Mercenary

No.	Title	Length
1.	"Through the Eyes of the Devil"	5:13
2.	"The Follower"	4:33
3.	"In a River of Madness"	5:59
4.	"Memoria"	5:43
5.	"Velvet Lies"	6:53
6.	"In Bloodred Shades"	4:35
7.	"Shades of Grey"	5:36
8.	"On the Edge of Sanity"	4:24
9.	"The Black Brigade"	5:44

Bonus tracks
No.	Title	Length
1.	"Incorporate Your Demons" (US bonus track)
2.	"Vanity for Sale" (iTunes bonus track)
3.	"The Devil's Own" (iTunes bonus track)

== Personnel ==
Band members

- René Pedersen – vocals, bass guitar
- Martin Buus – lead guitar, keyboards
- Jakob Mølbjerg – rhythm guitar
- Morten Løwe – drums

Guests

- Kim Olesen - keyboards

Additional credits

- Don G. – cover art
