= Everblack =

Everblack may refer to:

- Everblack (The Black Dahlia Murder album), an album by the American band The Black Dahlia Murder
- Everblack (Mercenary album), an album by the Danish band Mercenary
