= New Dominion =

New Dominion may refer to:

== Places ==
- New Dominion, Nova Scotia, Canada
- Xinjiang, China
- Northern Virginia

== Other uses ==
- The New Dominion, a Dutch death metal band
- New Dominion Pictures, an American television production company
