= Panzerchrist =

Danish blackened death metal band

- Origin: Aarhus, Denmark
- Genre: Blackened death metal
- Years active: 1993–present
- Labels: Serious Entertainment, Mighty Music, Neurotic
- Members: Sonja Rosenlund Ahl (Vocals); Frederik O'Carrol (Guitar); Danny Bo Pedersen (Guitar); Ove Lungskov(Drums); Rune B. Wasmer (bass/keyboards),
- Past members: Bo Summer; Reno Kiilerich; Lasse Hoile

Panzerchrist is a Danish blackened death metal band formed in 1993 by Michael Enevoldsen (after he left Illdisposed) and Lasse Hoile.

== History ==
Panzerchrist recorded a few demos and signed to Serious Entertainment. Six Seconds Kill was released by Serious Entertainment in 1996. In 1998, they released Outpost Fort Europa.

In 2000, drummer Reno Killerich (ex-Exmortem, Vile, etc.) and Bo Summer (also of Illdisposed) joined Panzerchrist to record Soul Collector, a WWII-themed album with German lyrics. Soul Collector was released by Mighty Music in 2000.

In 2002, Frederik O'Carroll and Rasmus Henriksen joined the band and they began work on Room Service, which included a cover of the Metal Church song "Metal Church." Room Service was recorded at Tue Madsen's Antfarm Studios (The Haunted, Illdisposed, Mnemic etc.) and released by Mighty Music in 2003. The title of each song is the first word(s) to be sung. Each song on the album ends with the words "Death, forever panzer", except the aforementioned cover.

In 2006, Panzerchrist drummer Killerich and Karina Bundgaard, now on keyboards, rejoined for the recording of Battalion Beast, released by Neurotic Records in 2006. This album features the words "Christ, thy name is panzer" at the end of each song.

In spring 2008, Panzerchrist vocalist Bo Summer was replaced with a singer known as "Johnny". Panzerchrist, previously a studio-only band, made plans to play live.

Panzerchrist featured past and present Members from Danish and Norwegian bands like Mercenary, Chainfist, Allfader and Illdisposed.

In 2011, Panzerchrist released the full-length album Regiment Ragnarok, on 18 April. This was followed two years later in July 2013 with the album 7th Offensive.

== Discography ==
Studio albums

- Six Seconds Kill (Serious Records, 1996)
- Outpost Fort Europa (Serious Records, 1998)
- Soul Collector (Mighty Music, 2000)
- Room Service (Mighty Music, 2003)
- Battalion Beast (Neurotic Records, 2006)
- Regiment Ragnarok (Listenable Records, 2011)
- 7th Offensive (Listenable Records, 2013)
- Last of a Kind (Emanzipation Productions, 2023)
- Maleficium – Part 1 (Emanzipation Productions, 2024)
- Maleficium – Part 2 (Emanzipation Productions, 2025)

EPs

- All Witches Shall Burn (2024)

Demos

- Forever Panzer (1995)

Compilation albums

- Bello (Mighty Music, 2007)
- Himmelfartskommando (Mighty Music, 2008)
