= Architect of Lies =

Studio album by Mercenary
- Released: 24 March 2008
- Recorded: 21 October – 12 December 2007
- Studio: Hansen Studios; Skafte Recordings
- Genre: Melodic death metal; power metal
- Length: 52:03
- Label: Century Media Records
- Producer: Jacob Hansen

Mercenary chronology
The Hours That Remain (2006)	Architect of Lies (2008)	Metamorphosis (2011)

Professional ratings
Review scores
Source	Rating
Collector's Guide to Heavy Metal	8/10
MetalSucks	3.5/5 stars
Metal.de	8/10 stars
Sputnikmusic	4/5 stars

Architect of Lies is the fifth studio album by Danish melodic death metal band Mercenary, and the third released through Century Media Records. This is the first album to include René "Renegade" Pedersen on bass guitar and death growls who replaced founding member Henrik "Kral" Andersen. This is also the last album to include vocalist Mikkel Sandager, keyboardist Morten Sandager, and drummer Mike Park. The album was released 24 March 2008.

Artwork is provided by Niklas Sundin who also did the artwork for 11 Dreams. The limited edition includes the bonus track "Death Connection" and a bonus DVD offering live footage filmed at Bang Your Head!!! 2007 and Summer Nights festival 2007, a detailed studio report and the promo video for "My World Is Ending", from their last album The Hours That Remain.

On 25 January, "Embrace the Nothing" was posted on the band's MySpace page.

== Track listing ==
All tracks are written by Mercenary.

No.	Title	Length
1.	"New Desire"	4:57
2.	"Bloodsong"	4:47
3.	"Embrace the Nothing"	4:51
4.	"This Black and Endless Never"	5:40
5.	"Isolation (The Loneliness in December)"	6:03
6.	"The Endless Fall"	5:08
7.	"Death Connection" (limited edition bonus track)	6:00
8.	"Black and Hollow"	4:49
9.	"Execution Style"	5:50
10.	"I Am Lies"	5:43
11.	"Public Failure Number One"	5:00

== Personnel ==
=== Band members ===
- Mikkel Sandager – clean vocals
- Jakob Mølbjerg – rhythm guitar, backing vocals
- Martin Buus – lead guitar
- Morten Sandager – keyboards
- Mike Park Nielsen – drums
- René Pedersen – bass, death growls

=== Guests ===
- Jacob Hansen – backing vocals (on "The Endless Fall")
- Robert Chouinard – spoken words (on "Execution Style")
