= Remains of the Gods =

Studio album by Light This City
- Released: May 17, 2005
- Genre: Melodic death metal; thrash metal
- Length: 34:08
- Label: Prosthetic
- Producer: Light This City; Zack Ohren

Light This City chronology
The Hero Cycle (2003)	Remains of the Gods (2005)	Facing the Thousand (2006)

Professional ratings
Review scores
Source	Rating
AllMusic	3/5 stars
Lambgoat	7/10 stars
BW&BK	8.5/10 stars

Remains of the Gods is the second studio album by melodic death metal band Light This City.

== Track listing ==
1. "Remains of the Gods" – 4:00
2. "Obituary" – 3:05
3. "A Guardian in a Passerby" – 3:07
4. "The Hunt" – 2:46
5. "Letter to My Abuser" – 3:19
6. "Fractured by the Fall" – 4:16
7. "The Static Masses" – 3:24
8. "Guiding the North Star" – 2:42
9. "Your Devoted Victim" – 4:35
10. "The Last Catastrophe" (Instrumental) – 2:44

== Personnel ==
- Laura Nichol − vocals
- Mike Dias − bass guitar
- Ben Murray − drums, guitar
