= Under a Stone with No Inscription =

Studio album by Anata
- Released: 2004
- Recorded: 2003 at StudioMega
- Genre: Technical death metal
- Length: 44:51
- Label: Wicked World Records
- Producer: Fredrik Schälin

Anata chronology
Dreams of Death and Dismay (2001)	Under a Stone with No Inscription (2004)	The Conductor's Departure (2006)

Under a Stone with No Inscription is Anata's third full-length album. It was released by Wicked World Records.

Professional ratings
Review scores
Source	Rating
AllMusic	3/5 stars

== Track listing ==
1. "Shackled to Guilt" – 3:48
2. "A Problem Yet to Be Solved" – 3:47
3. "Entropy Within" – 4:05
4. "Dance to the Song of Apathy" - 4:39
5. "Sewerages of the Mind" - 4:30
6. "Built on Sand" - 3:20
7. "Under the Debris" - 5:56
8. "The Drowning" - 3:56
9. "Leaving the Spirit Behind" - 3:44
10. "Any Kind of Magic or Miracle" - 7:06

== Personnel ==
- Fredrik Schälin - Lead vocals, guitar
- Andreas Allenmark - guitar, vocals
- Henrik Drake - bass
- Conny Pettersson - drums
