= A Perfect Absolution =

Studio album by Gorod
- Released: 12 March 2012
- Genre: Technical death metal, progressive metal
- Length: 39:42
- Label: Listenable (EU); Unique Leader (US)

Gorod chronology
Process of a New Decline (2009)	A Perfect Absolution (2012)	A Maze of Recycled Creeds (2015)

Professional ratings
Review scores
Source	Rating
Ultimate Guitar	8.9/10
Metal Injection	9/10

A Perfect Absolution is the fourth studio album by French death metal band Gorod. The album was released in March 2012 under Listenable Records and is the band's first full-length album with vocalist Julien Deyres.

== Track list ==
No.	Title	Length
1.	"The Call to Redemption"	1:10
2.	"Birds of Sulphur"	3:58
3.	"Sailing Into The Earth"	4:55
4.	"Elements and Spirit"	5:07
5.	"The Axe of God"	3:46
6.	"5000 at the Funeral"	5:53
7.	"Carved in the Wind"	6:19
8.	"Varangian Paradise"	4:38
9.	"Tribute of Blood"	4:02

== Credits ==
- Julien Deyres - vocals
- Mathieu Pascal - guitar, production, engineering
- Nicolas Alberny - guitar
- Benoit Claus - bass
- Samuel Santiago - drums
- Frédéric Motte - mixing, mastering
- Yohann Huhner - cover art, layout

Guests:

- Xavier Bertrand - Additional vocals on "Birds of Sulphur" and "The Axe of God"
- Michael Keene - Second guitar solo on "The Axe of God"
- Guillaume Martinot - Additional vocals on "Birds of Sulphur" and "The Axe of God"
- Christian Müenzner - Guitar solo on "Carved in the Wind"
