= Stormchaser (album) =

Studio album by Light This City
- Released: Novemder 11, 2008
- Genre: Melodic death metal
- Label: Prosthetic; Razor & Tie
- Producer: Zack Ohren; Light This City

Light This City chronology
Facing the Thousand (2006)	Stormchaser (2008)

Professional ratings
Review scores
Source	Rating
Allmusic	3.5/5 stars

Stormchaser is the fourth studio album by the melodic death metal band Light This City.

== Track listing ==
1. "Stormchaser" – 5:25
2. "Fragile Heroes" – 4:01
3. "The Anhedonia Epidemic" – 4:53
4. "Beginning with Release" – 4:54
5. "Firehaven" (featuring Chuck Billy of Testament) – 3:35
6. "The Collector, Part. 1: Muse" – 3:32
7. "The Collector, Part. 2: Donor" (featuring John Strachan of The Funeral Pyre) – 3:43
8. "A Desperate Resolution" – 4:33
9. "Wake Me at Sunset" – 5:11
10. "Bridge to Cross" – 3:30
11. "Sand and Snow" – 3:18
12. "Self Portrait" – 3:30

== Personnel ==
- Laura Nichol – vocals
- Ryan Hansen – guitar
- Brian Forbes – guitar
- Jon Frost – bass guitar
- Ben Murray: drums
