= Neurotripsicks =

- re-release cover

Studio album by Gorod
- Released: 15 July 2005
- Recorded: BUD Records Studios
- Genre: Technical death metal
- Length: 44:27
- Label: Deadsun/Willowtip

Gorod chronology
Promo 2002 (2002)	Neurotripsicks (2005)	Leading Vision (2006)

Alternative cover
- original cover

Professional ratings
Review scores
Source	Rating
Allmusic	3.5/5 stars

Neurotripsicks is the first full-length studio album by the technical death metal band Gorod. In 2004, the album was released under their original name, Gorgasm, on Deadsun Records. In 2005, on Willowtip Records, the album was re-released with two bonus tracks and under their current name of Gorod.

== Track listing ==
Recorded & mixed at BUD Records Studios,

1. "Intro" – 1:23
2. "Gutting Job" – 3:55
3. "Smoked Skulls" – 4:00
4. "Hunt to the Weaks" – 4:23
5. "Beware of Tramps" – 4:42
6. "Pig's Bloated Face" – 5:27
7. "Harmony in Torture" – 4:59
8. "Rusted Nails Attack" – 5:15
9. "Earth Pus" – 4:39
10. "Neuronal Disorder State" – 5:44

2005 Re-release Tracks

11. "Gorod (1999)"
12. "Submission Transfer (2005)"

== Credits ==
- Guillaume Martinot - Vocals
- Arnaud Pontaco - Guitar
- Mathieu Pascal - Guitar
- Benoit Claus - Bass
- Sandrine - Drums

== Release history ==
Region	Date
Original Date (Gorgasm)	April 2004
Re-release (Gorod)	15 July 2005
