= The Lair of the White Worm (album) =

Studio album by God Dethroned
- Released: November 15, 2004
- Recorded: 2004
- Studios: Berno Studio, Malmö, Sweden
- Genre: Melodic death metal
- Label: Metal Blade

God Dethroned chronology
Into the Lungs of Hell (2003)	The Lair of the White Worm (2004)	The Toxic Touch (2006)

Professional ratings
Review scores
Source	Rating
AllMusic	3.5/5 stars
MetalReviews.com	80/100

The Lair of the White Worm is the sixth full-length from the Dutch melodic death metal band God Dethroned.

== Track listing ==
1. "Nihilism" – 5:10
2. "Arch Enemy Spain" – 4:20
3. "Sigma Enigma" – 4:05
4. "The Lair of the White Worm" – 3:31
5. "Rusty Nails" – 6:03
6. "Loyal to the Crown of God Dethroned" – 3:25
7. "Last Zip of Spit" – 4:19
8. "The Grey Race" – 4:10
9. "Salt in Your Wounds" – 5:01
