= Where Echoes Gather =

Studio album by Communic
- Released: 27 October 2017
- Recorded: 2016–2017
- Genre: Progressive metal, power metal, thrash metal
- Length: 73:54
- Label: AFM Records
- Producer: Oddleif Stensland

Communic chronology
The Bottom Deep (2011)	Where Echoes Gather (2017)	Hiding from the World (2020)

Professional ratings
Review scores
Source	Rating
Metal Hammer	5/7
Powermetal.de	8/10
Rock Hard	8/10
Stormbringer	4/5

Where Echoes Gather is the fifth studio album by Norwegian progressive metal band Communic. It was released on 27 October 2017 through Nuclear Blast records.

== Track listing ==
No.	Title	Length
1.	"The Pulse of the Earth: 1. "The Magnetic Center" (3:48); 2. "Impact of the Wave" (4:04); "	7:52
2.	"Where Echoes Gather: 1. "Beneath the Giant" (4:10); 2. "The Underground Swine" (5:31); "	9:41
3.	"Moondance"	8:51
4.	"Where History Lives"	6:50
5.	"Black Flag of Hate"	7:35
6.	"The Claws of the Sea: 1. "Journey into the Source" (7:14); 2. "The First Moment" (5:04); "	12:18
7.	"Watching It All Disappear" (live bonus track)	6:45
8.	"At Dewy Prime" (live bonus track)	9:22
9.	"Waves of Visual Decay" (live bonus track)	4:40

== Personnel ==
Communic

- Oddleif Stensland – vocals, guitar
- Tor Alte Andersen – drums
- Erik Mortensen – bass
