= Through Our Darkest Days =

Studio album by Mercenary
- Released: 26 July 2013 (Europe); 30 July 2013 (US)
- Studio: Hansen Studios, Denmark
- Genre: Melodic death metal, power metal
- Length: 48:10
- Label: NoiseArt Records (Europe); Prosthetic Records (US)
- Producer: Jacob Hansen

Mercenary chronology
Metamorphosis (2011)	Through Our Darkest Days (2013)	Soundtrack for the End Times (2023)

Through Our Darkest Days is the seventh studio album by Danish melodic death metal band Mercenary. It is their only album with drummer Peter Mathiesen who joined the band as a regular member in 2012 after performing more than 50 shows with them. He left the band in 2019.

The cover artwork was done by Mircea Gabriel Eftemie the guitarist of the Danish metal band Mnemic. René Pedersen commented: "The cover artwork portraits a dark atmosphere, symbolizing the darkness that surrounds us everyday. But in darkness there is always a light, which in this case is symbolized by a burning candle, and the figure that holds its eyes in its hands, showing a piece of the world as seen through our eyes."

== Track list ==
All music is composed by Mercenary

No.	Title	Length
1.	"A New Dawn"	5:15
2.	"Welcome the Sickness"	5:18
3.	"Through Our Darkest Days"	4:39
4.	"Dreamstate Machine"	5:34
5.	"A Moment of Clarity"	5:02
6.	"Beyond This Night"	5:45
7.	"Starving Eyes"	5:14
8.	"Generation Hate"	4:50
9.	"Forever the Unknown"	6:31

Bonus track
No.	Title	Length
10.	"Holding On to Serenity"	5:06

== Credits ==
Band members

- René Pedersen – vocals, bass
- Jakob Mølbjerg – rhythm guitar
- Martin Buus – lead guitar, keyboards
- Peter Mathiesen – drums

Guest appearances

- Kim Olesen – keyboards

Additional credits

- Jakob Hansen – producer
- Mircea Gabriel Eftemie – cover artwork
