= Passiondale (album) =

Studio album by God Dethroned
- Released: April 24, 2009
- Genres: Blackened death metal, melodic death metal
- Label: Metal Blade

God Dethroned chronology
The Toxic Touch (2006)	Passiondale (2009)	Under the Sign of the Iron Cross (2010)

Professional ratings
Review scores
Source	Rating
Allmusic	3.5/5 stars

Passiondale is the eighth full-length album by God Dethroned, released on April 24, 2009. It is a concept album based on the Battle of Passchendaele in World War I. The album was recorded with only three band members, with Henri Sattler recording all guitar parts. This album returns to the blackened death metal sound originally heard on The Grand Grimoire, Bloody Blasphemy, and Ravenous while retaining the melodic death metal sound of the previous three albums.

== Track listing ==
1. "The Cross of Sacrifice" – 1:05
2. "Under a Darkening Sky" – 3:59
3. "No Man's Land" – 3:14
4. "Poison Fog" – 6:39
5. "Drowning in Mud" – 3:44
6. "Passiondale" – 4:05
7. "No Survivors" – 3:51
8. "Behind Enemy Lines" – 3:38
9. "Fallen Empires" – 4:49
10. "Artifacts of the Great War" – 2:57

== Personnel ==
=== God Dethroned ===
- Henri Sattler – vocals, guitars
- Henk Zinger – bass
- Roel Sanders – drums

=== Guest musicians ===
- Danny Servaes - Keyboards
- Midori Hass-Kayanuma - Voice (Track 1)
- Marco v.d. Velde (of The Wounded) - Clean Vocals (Tracks 4 and 7)
- Joerg Uken - Keyboards (Track 1)
