= The Bottom Deep =

Studio album by Communic
- Released: 22 July 2011
- Recorded: 2010–2011
- Genre: Progressive metal, power metal
- Length: 60:15
- Label: Nuclear Blast
- Producer: Communic

Communic chronology
Payment of Existence (2008)	The Bottom Deep (2011)	Where Echoes Gather (2017)

Professional ratings
Review scores
Source	Rating
Rock Hard (de)	(8/10)

The Bottom Deep is the fourth studio album recorded by Norwegian progressive metal band Communic. It was released on 22 July 2011 through Nuclear Blast records.

== Track listing ==
No.	Title	Length
1.	"Facing Tomorrow"	7:44
2.	"Denial"	6:34
3.	"Flood River Blood"	5:16
4.	"Voyage of Discovery"	6:51
5.	"In Silence With my Scars"	6:23
6.	"My Fallen"	6:53
7.	"Destroyer of Bloodlines"	5:49
8.	"A Wayward Soul"	7:03
9.	"The Bottom Deep"	2:38
10.	"In Union We Stand (Overkill cover)"	5:04

== Personnel ==
Communic

- Oddleif Stensland – Lead vocals, guitar
- Tor Alte Andersen – Drums
- Erik Mortensen – Bass
