= The Hero Cycle =

Studio album by Light This City
- Released: September 5, 2003
- Recorded: Castle Ultimate Studios, Oakland, California
- Genre: Melodic death metal; metalcore
- Length: 33:09
- Label: Reflections of Ruin
- Producer: Zack Ohren

Light This City chronology
The Hero Cycle (2003)	Remains of the Gods (2005)

Alternative Cover
- 2009 Rerelease

Professional ratings
Review scores
Source	Rating
AllMusic	2.5/5 stars
About.com	3/5 stars

The Hero Cycle is the debut studio album by the American melodic death metal band Light This City. This was the band's, and label's first album release. The Hero Cycle is being re-issued through Prosthetic Records. The original date was set to be released August 18, 2009 but it was later pushed back to January 19, 2010.

== Track listing ==
1. "Apostate" – 4:30
2. "Picture Start" – 2:29
3. "Give Up" – 3:24
4. "Parisian Sun" – 2:03
5. "Cold" – 3:30 (At the Gates cover)
6. "Laid to Rest" – 3:20
7. "Sierra" – 3:28
8. "No Solace In Sleep" - 3:49
9. "The Weight of Glory" - 2:51
10. "Next to Godliness" - 3:49
- Lyrics written by Laura Nichol, music written by Ben Murray.

== Band line-up ==
- Laura Nichol - vocals
- Steven Shirley - guitar
- Mike Dias - bass
- Ben Murray - drums

== Additional credits ==
- Additional vocals on "The Weight of Glory" by Phil Benson
- Additional guitar on "Cold" by Jeff Allen
