= Visceral Bleeding =

Swedish death metal band

- Origin: Kalmar, Sweden
- Genres: Technical death metal
- Years active: 1999–2019
- Label: Neurotic Records
- Past members: Martin Eklöv; Martin Pedersen; Niklas Dewerud; Dennis Röndum; Marcus Nilsson; Martin Bermheden; Calle Löfgren; Peter Persson; Benny Bats; Tobias Persson; Johan Bergström

Visceral Bleeding was a death metal band from Sweden.

Despite the band's Swedish nationality, Metal Hammer stated the opinion that the band's "brand of death metal just doesn’t sound that Swedish at all."

== Biography ==
Visceral Bleeding was formed sometime in the late nineties by Peter Persson and Niklas Dewerud. Influenced by bands such as Suffocation and Monstrosity, they performed what they thought the death metal scene was lacking. Joined by Calle Löfgren on bass, Dennis Röndum on vocals, and Marcus Nilsson on lead guitar, they released a demo, Internal Decomposition. Once signed to Neurotic, they released their first album, Remnants of Deprivation, in 2002. After its release, Dewerud left Visceral Bleeding to focus all his attention on the band Spawn of Possession; he was replaced by Tobias Persson.

The band's second album, Transcend into Ferocity, came out in 2004, and after its release another member quit, this time vocalist Dennis Röndum, also to join Spawn of Possession. A replacement was found in Martin Pedersen. He joined the band as they toured across Europe, supporting bands like Obituary and Deicide.

While the band was writing the third album, Absorbing the Disarray, Nilsson decided that he needed to step back from the scene, as did Martin Bermheden. Absorbing the Disarray was released in June 2006. After its release, Löfgren got married and had a daughter, and left for an undisclosed amount of time while Martin Andersson, former Eklöv filled in for him on the following tour with Deicide, Cryptopsy, and Skinless.

== Members ==
=== Last known ===
- Tobias "Rotten Boy" Persson - drums (2002–2015), guitar (2015–2019)
- Johan Bergström - vocals (2015–2019)

=== Former members ===
- Martin "Body" Andersson (F.K.A. Eklöv) - bass (2006–2017)
- Martin Pedersen - vocals (2004–2012)
- Peter Persson - guitar (1999–2009)
- Calle Löfgren - bass (1999–2006)
- Niklas Dewerud - drums (1999–2002)
- Dennis Röndum - vocals (1999–2004)
- Marcus Nilsson - guitar (2000–2006)
- Martin "Germ" Bermheden- guitar (2006–2008)
- Benny Bats - guitar (2009–2015)
- Tommy Carlsson - vocals (2004)
- Morph(eus) - vocals (2012–2015)

== Discography ==
- Internal Decomposition (Demo, 2000)
- Remnants of Deprivation (Album, Retribute Records, 2002)
- Transcend Into Ferocity (Album, Neurotic Records, 2004)
- Remnants Revived (Remnants of Deprivation remastered, three more songs and four videos, Neurotic Records, 2005)
- Absorbing the Disarray (Album, Neurotic Records, 2007)
