= Only the Ruthless Remain =

Studio album by Skinless
- Released: June 2nd, 2015
- Recorded: Late 2014, early 2015
- Genre: Brutal death metal
- Length: 35:35
- Label: Relapse

Skinless chronology
Trample the Weak, Hurdle the Dead (2006)	Only the Ruthless Remain (2015)	Savagery (2018)

Only the Ruthless Remain is the fifth studio album by American death metal band Skinless. It includes the members that produced the band's 1998 debut album, Progression Towards Evil and their second album Foreshadowing Our Demise, with the addition of a second guitarist, Dave Matthews.

== Track listing ==
All music is composed by Noah Carpenter, Dave Matthews, Joe Keyser and Bob Beaulac.

No.	Title	Lyrics	Length
1.	"Serpenticide"	Sherwood Webber	4:39
2.	"Only the Ruthless Remain"	Webber, "Glen" Brenton Watkajtys	6:23
3.	"Skinless"	Webber	4:42
4.	"Flamethrower"	Webber, Carpenter	4:18
5.	"The Beast Smells Blood"	Webber, Carpenter	5:04
6.	"Funeral Curse"	Webber	6:10
7.	"Barbaric Proclivity"		4:19
Total length:			35:35

== Notes ==
After the band disbanded in 2011, Skinless reformed in 2013 with the original line-up that recorded the band's first two albums. It is their first album in nearly nine years.

== Credits ==
Skinless

- Sherwood Webber – vocals
- Noah Carpenter – guitar
- Dave Matthews – guitar
- Joe Keyser – bass guitar
- Bob Beaulac – drums

Other credits

- Brad Boatright – mastering
- Tom Case – mixing
- Dave Otero – recording engineer
