= Process of a New Decline =

Studio album by Gorod
- Released: June 1, 2009
- Recorded: Bud Records Studio
- Genre: Technical death metal
- Length: 50:04
- Label: Willowtip, Listenable

Gorod chronology
Leading Vision (2006)	Process of a New Decline (2009)	A Perfect Absolution (2012)

Professional ratings
Review scores
Source	Rating
Allmusic	4/5 stars
Sputnikmusic	3.5/5 stars
Antiquiet	4/5 stars
Blabbermouth	6.5/10 stars

Process of a New Decline is the third full-length album by technical death metal band Gorod and the first to feature new drummer Samuel Santiago.

== Track listing ==
No.	Title	Length
1.	"Disavow Your God"	5:02
2.	"Programmers of Decline"	5:11
3.	"Diverted Logic"	4:58
4.	"Rebirth of Senses"	4:05
5.	"The Path"	3:44
6.	"Splinters of Life"	5:20
7.	"Guilty of Dispersal"	4:23
8.	"Gilded Cage"	3:25
9.	"A Common Hope"	4:16
10.	"Watershed"	5:05
11.	"Almighty's Murderer"	4:35

== Credits ==
- Guillaume Martinot - Vocals
- Arnaud Pontaco - Guitar
- Mathieu Pascal - Guitar
- Benoit Claus - Bass
- Samuel Santiago - Drums

== Release history ==
Region	Date
Europe	June 1, 2009
North America	July 28, 2009
