= Absorbing the Disarray =

Studio album by Visceral Bleeding
- Released: 9 May 2007
- Recorded: Studio FlatPig, in June 2006
- Genre: Technical death metal
- Length: 39:30
- Label: Neurotic
- Producer: Robert Ahrling

Visceral Bleeding chronology
Transcend into Ferocity (2004)	Absorbing the Disarray (2007)

Professional ratings
Review scores
Source	Rating
Decibel	favorable

Absorbing the Disarray is the third studio album by Swedish death metal band Visceral Bleeding.

== Track listing ==
All tracks are written by Martin Pedersen, Peter Persson, and Tobias "Rotten Boy" Persson

No.	Title	Length
1.	"Bi-Polar"	0:53
2.	"Disgust the Vile"	4:13
3.	"Despise Defined"	3:11
4.	"Perpetual Torment Commence"	3:37
5.	"Emulated Sense: Failure"	3:13
6.	"Rip the Flesh"	4:00
7.	"Absorbing the Disarray"	4:30
8.	"Awakened by Blood"	3:54
9.	"Beyond the Realms of Reason"	3:47
10.	"Bring Forth the Bedlam"	3:00
11.	"Demise of the One That Conquered"	5:12
12.	"Rip the Flesh" (multimedia track)
13.	"Disgut the Vile" (multimedia track)

== Personnel ==
Performers

- Martin Pedersen – vocals
- Martin Bermheden – guitar
- Peter Persson – guitar
- Calle Löfgren – bass
- Tobbe Persson – drums
