= Conspiracy in Mind =

Studio album by Communic
- Released: 21 February 2005; 28 June 2005 (US)
- Recorded: 2004
- Studios: Hansen Studios, Denmark
- Genres: Progressive metal, power metal
- Length: 57:42
- Label: Nuclear Blast
- Producers: Jacob Hansen, Communic

Communic chronology
Conspiracy in Mind (demo) (2004)	Conspiracy in Mind (2005)	Waves of Visual Decay (2006)

Professional ratings
Review scores
Source	Rating
AllMusic	link
Rock Hard	(10/10)

Conspiracy in Mind is the debut album by the Norwegian progressive/power metal band Communic.

== Track listing ==
All tracks are written by Oddleif Stensland, arranged by Communic.

No.	Title	Length
1.	"Conspiracy in Mind"	7:39
2.	"History Reversed"	6:49
3.	"They Feed on Our Fear"	9:54
4.	"Communication Sublime"	7:28
5.	"The Distance"	8:08
6.	"Ocean Bed"	6:45
7.	"Silence Surrounds"	10:59

Limited edition
No.	Title	Length
8.	"Another Distance" (piano version of "The Distance")	5:00
9.	"Conspiracy in Mind" (video edit version)	5:02

== Reception ==
In 2005, Conspiracy in Mind was ranked number 497 in Rock Hard magazine's book of The 500 Greatest Rock & Metal Albums of All Time.

== Personnel ==
Communic

- Oddleif Stensland – vocals, guitars
- Erik Mortensen – bass
- Tor Atle Andersen – drums

Additional musicians

- Peter Jensen – keyboards

Production

- Recorded, mixed and mastered by Jacob Hansen at Hansen Studios, Denmark

Technical information

Artwork by Mattias Norén of ProgArt Media
