= Payment of Existence =

Studio album by Communic
- Released: May 30, 2008
- Recorded: Hansen Studios
- Genre: Progressive metal, power metal
- Length: 62:42
- Label: Nuclear Blast
- Producer: Jacob Hansen

Communic chronology
Waves of Visual Decay (2006)	Payment of Existence (2008)	The Bottom Deep (2011)

Professional ratings
Review scores
Source	Rating
Rock Hard (de)	(8/10)

Payment of Existence is the third studio album by the Norwegian progressive/power metal band Communic.

== Track listing ==
All tracks are written by Oddleif Stensland, arranged by Communic

No.	Title	Length
1.	"On Ancient Ground"	8:44
2.	"The Abandoned One"	8:45
3.	"Becoming of Man"	7:54
4.	"Payment of Existence"	7:32
5.	"Through the Labyrinth of Years"	5:39
6.	"Raven's Cry"	8:18
7.	"Unpredictables of Life"	6:39
8.	"Stone Carved Eyes"	9:11

== Personnel ==
Communic

- Oddleif Stensland – lead vocals, lead guitar, rhythm guitar
- Erik Mortensen – bass
- Tor Atle Andersen – drums

Production

- Recorded, mixed, and mastered by Jacob Hansen at Hansen Studios, Denmark.

== Technical information ==
Artwork by Jan Yrlund of Darkgrove Design.
