= A Maze of Recycled Creeds =

Studio album by Gorod
- Released: 16 October 2015
- Studio: Bud Studio
- Genre: Technical death metal; progressive metal
- Length: 43:36
- Label: Listenable (Europe); Unique Leader (United States)
- Producer: Mathieu Pascal

Gorod chronology
A Perfect Absolution (2012)	A Maze of Recycled Creeds (2015)	Æthra (2018)

A Maze of Recycled Creeds is the fifth studio album by French technical death metal band Gorod. It was released on 16 October 2015 via Listenable Records in Europe, and Unique Leader Records in the United States. It's the band's first album to feature drummer Karol Diers.

Professional ratings
Review scores
Source	Rating
MetalInjection	7/10

== Track listing ==
All lyrics are written by Julien "Nutz" Deyres; all music is composed by Mathieu Pascal, except where noted.

No.	Title	Music	Length
1.	"Air de l'Ordre"	Erik Satie	0:55
2.	"Temple of the Art-God"		3:21
3.	"Celestial Nature"		4:25
4.	"Inner Alchemy"		6:12
5.	"The Mystic Triad of Artistry"		5:08
6.	"An Order to Reclaim"		4:32
7.	"From Passion to Holiness"		5:45
8.	"Dig into Yourself"		3:20
9.	"Rejoice Your Soul"		4:50
10.	"Syncretic Delirium"		5:08
Total length:			43:36

Europe bonus track
No.	Title	Length
11.	"An Order to Reclaim" (alternate version)	4:14
Total length:		47:50

US bonus track
No.	Title	Length
11.	"Celestial Nature" (alternate version)	2:43
Total length:		46:19

== Personnel ==
Gorod

- Julien "Nutz" Deyres – vocals
- Mathieu Pascal - guitars
- Nicolas Alberny - guitars
- Benoit Claus - bass
- Karol Diers - drums

Additional musicians

- Denis Cornardeau - guitar solo (track 10)

Production and design

- Mathieu Pascal - production, recording, mixing, layout
- Pierre-Yves Marani – mastering
- Eric Liberge - artwork
