= Soundtrack for the End Times =

Studio album by Mercenary
- Released: 22 September 2023
- Recorded: 2020–2022
- Genre: Melodic death metal, power metal, progressive metal
- Length: 61:43
- Label: NoiseArt Records
- Producer: Martin Buus

Mercenary chronology
Through Our Darkest Days (2013)	Soundtrack for the End Times (2023)

Singles from Soundtrack for the End Times
- 1. "From the Ashes of the Fallen" Released: 15 April 2020; 2. "Heart of the Numb" Released: 17 July 2023; 3. "Anthem for the Anxious" Released: 15 August 2023

Soundtrack for the End Times is the eighth studio album by Danish melodic death metal band Mercenary. It is their first album in 10 years, since their 2013 album Through Our Darkest Days, and their first album with new drummer Martin Nielsen who joined the band in 2019.

== Track list ==
All music is composed by Mercenary.

No.	Title	Length
1.	"Burning in Reverse"	5:15
2.	"Heart of the Numb"	5:18
3.	"Where Darkened Souls Belong"	6:46
4.	"Through This Blackened Hatred"	5:14
5.	"Anthem for the Anxious"	5:09
6.	"A Darker Path"	6:09
7.	"Become the Flame"	4:21
8.	"From the Ashes of the Fallen"	6:06
9.	"Black Heart, Dead Tissue"	5:06
10.	"Black Blood Soil"	5:06
11.	"Beyond the Waves"	7:13

== Credits ==
Band members

- René Pedersen – vocals, bass guitar
- Jakob Mølbjerg – rhythm guitar
- Martin Buus – lead guitar, keyboards
- Martin Nielsen – drums

Guest appearances

- Matt Heafy – vocals on track 2

Additional credits

- Jakob Hansen – mixing, mastering
- Martin Buus – producer
- Niklas Sundin – cover artwork
