= Anata (band) =

Swedish technical death metal band

- Origin: Varberg, Sweden
- Genres: Technical death metal
- Years active: 1993–present (hiatus from 2008–2023)
- Labels: Earache, Season of Mist
- Members: Fredrik Schälin; Henrik Drake; Conny Pettersson
- Past members: Mattias Svensson; Martin Sjöstrand; Robert Petersson; Andreas Allenmark
- Website: www.anata.se/

Anata is a technical death metal band from Varberg, Sweden that formed in 1993.

To date, they have released two demos, four albums and a split album with Bethzaida. In 2005, they completed recording the album The Conductor's Departure, released in June 2006 on Earache Records/Wicked World Records. Anata have toured Europe (one full UK tour in 2004, two UK/Ireland tours in 2004, 2006) with death metal acts such as Dismember, Decapitated, Rotting Christ, and Psycroptic. In 2006, Anata played at Maryland Deathfest, Baltimore, their first United States appearance to date. Anata have performed at festivals in Europe such as Fuck the Commerce, Neurotic Deathfest, Uppsala Blodbad, KieloWatt, and Gothenburg Deathfest.

Anata had been inactive since Andreas Allenmark left in 2008, until the band announced that they were tracking vocals for a new album in October 2023. As of 2026, no new album has been released. The band posts on social media roughly once a year.

== Musical style ==
Their style uses dissonance, including contrapuntal structures employing whole- and half-step harmony, as well as dissonant chords. As their music relies on melody and counterpoint, in contrast to most death metal bands that focus on moving chords and percussive effects (especially complex palm muting patterns), they are sometimes labeled melodic death metal. Most fans consider this an inaccurate characterization, as the term generally refers to a particular style of death metal, namely, the "Gothenburg metal" sound pioneered by bands like In Flames and Dark Tranquillity, rather than death metal with a strong melodic element. Anata, though hailing from Sweden (considered the birthplace of melodic death metal), bears little resemblance to these bands. They bear a stronger resemblance to technical death metal pioneers like Cynic and Atheist, who also employed a great deal of counterpoint (for both bands, the two guitars and bass are rarely playing the same part). However, Anata has little of the jazz fusion influences that Cynic or Atheist had, instead fusing the contrapuntal style with the modern technical death metal style of bands such as Psycroptic and Decapitated.

== Discography ==
=== Studio albums ===
- The Infernal Depths of Hatred (CD, Season of Mist, 1998)
- Dreams of Death and Dismay (CD, Season of Mist, 2001)
- Under a Stone With No Inscription (CD, Wicked World, 2004)
- The Conductor's Departure (CD, Wicked World, 2006)

=== Demos ===
- Bury Forever the Garden of Lie (Demo, 1995)
- Vast Lands of My Infernal Dominion (Demo, 1997)

=== Split albums ===
- WAR Vol. II - Anata vs. Bethzaida (1999, split album with Bethzaida)

=== Music video ===
- Entropy Within https://www.youtube.com/watch?v=ojdrivCQQ-Q

== Members ==
=== Current members ===
- Fredrik Schälin − lead vocals, guitar (1993–present)
- Henrik Drake − bass (1996–present)
- Conny Pettersson − drums (2001–present)

=== Former members ===
- Mattias Svensson − guitar (1993–1996)
- Martin Sjöstrand − bass (1993–1996)
- Robert Petersson − drums (1993–2001)
- Andreas Allenmark − guitar, backing vocals (1997–2008)
