= Hiding from the World =

Studio album by Communic
- Released: 20 November 2020
- Recorded: 2020
- Genre: Progressive metal, power metal, thrash metal
- Length: 60:30
- Label: AFM
- Producer: Oddleif Stensland

Communic chronology
| Where Echoes Gather (2017) | Hiding from the World (2020) |

Singles from Hiding from the World
- 1. "My Temple of Pride" Released: 20 October 2020; 2. "Hiding from the World" Released: 30 October 2020

Professional ratings
Review scores
| Source | Rating |
|---|---|
| Blabbermouth.net | 8.5/10 |
| Rock Hard | 8.5/10 |
| Stormbringer | 4/5 |

Hiding from the World is the sixth studio album by Norwegian progressive metal band Communic. It was released on 20 November 2020 through Nuclear Blast records. The album's cover artwork was made by Travis Smith.

== Track listing ==
| No. | Title | Length |
|---|---|---|
| 1. | "Plunder of Thoughts" | 8:02 |
| 2. | "Hiding from the World" | 9:25 |
| 3. | "My Temple of Pride" | 6:51 |
| 4. | "Face in the Crowd" | 7:35 |
| 5. | "Born Without a Heart" | 9:59 |
| 6. | "Scavengers Await" | 7:19 |
| 7. | "Soon to Be..." (instrumental) | 1:22 |
| 8. | "Forgotten" | 9:57 |

== Personnel ==
Communic

- Oddleif Stensland – vocals, guitar
- Tor Alte Andersen – drums
- Erik Mortensen – bass
