= Gorod (band) =

French death metal band

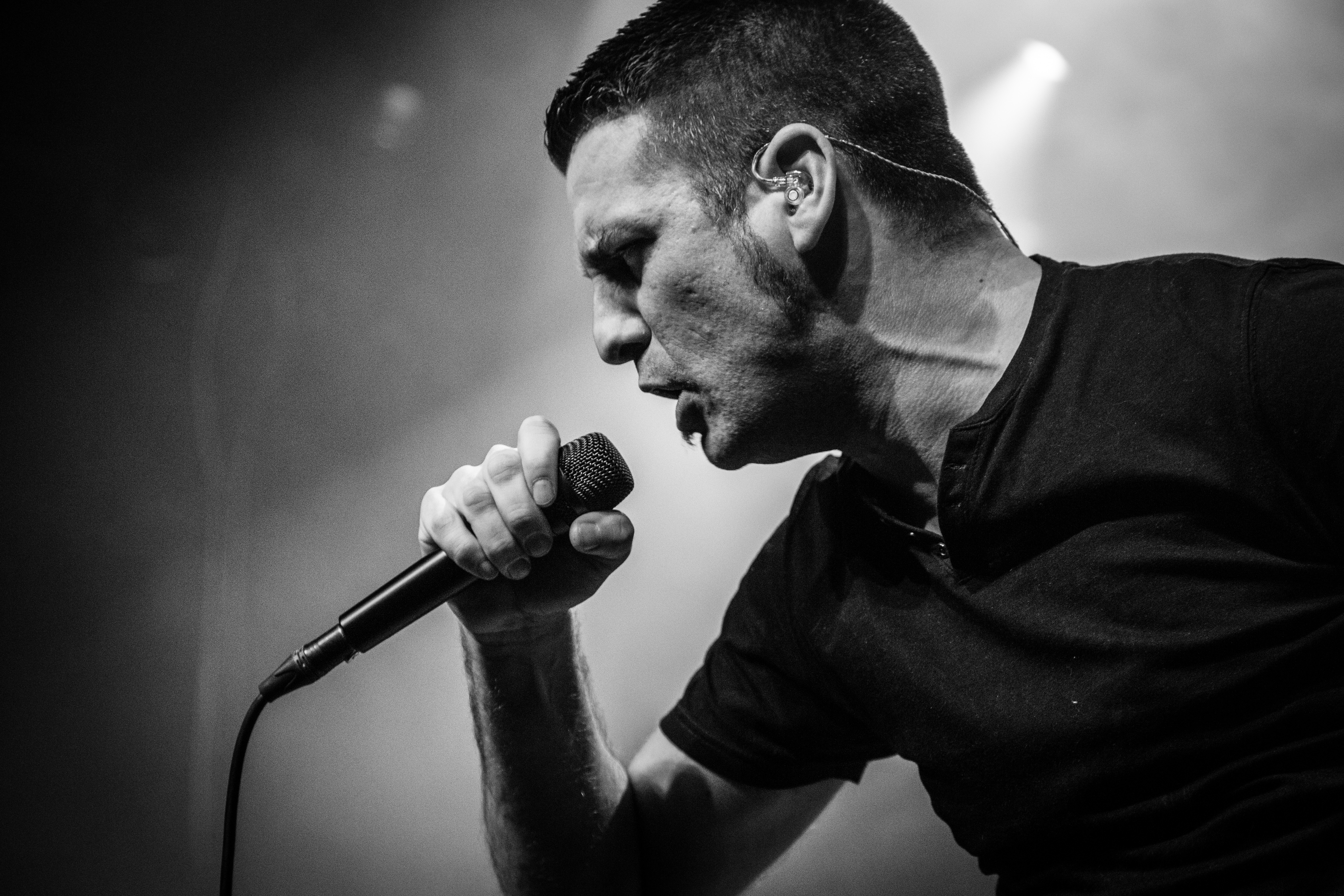
- Gorod at Complexity Fest 2017

Background information
- Also known as: Gorgasm (1997-2005)
- Origin: Bordeaux, France
- Genres: Technical death metal, progressive metal
- Years active: 1997–present
- Labels: Willowtip, Listenable, Unique Leader
- Members: Julien "Nutz" Deyres; Mathieu Pascal; Benoit Claus; Nicolas Alberny; Karol Diers
- Past members: Guillaume Martinot; Sandrine Bourguignon; Arnaud Pontacq; Samuel Santiago
- Website: gorodofficial.com

Gorod is a technical death metal band from Bordeaux, France.

== History ==
Gorod originally formed in 1997 under the name Gorgasm, but later changed their named to Gorod in 2005, to avoid confusion with an American death metal band of the same name. They released their debut album Neurotripsicks on Deadsun Records in 2004, which was later re-released by Willowtip Records a year after. They later followed up with Leading Vision in 2006. Their original drummer, Sandrine Bourguignon would also leave the band around this time.

In 2008, Gorod announced they had written six new songs, which were to be a part of their upcoming album. In May 2009, the band announced their new album Process of a New Decline as well as releasing another track from that album, "Programmers of Decline" on their Myspace as well. The album was released a month after to fairly moderate critical acclaim. This album would also be their last with their original vocalist Guillaume Martinot, who would later be replaced by Julien Deyres. The band would join the Maryland Deathfest festival in support the album.

In December 2011, the band announced they began mixing their new album, as well as joining Obscura on tour for their 2011 album, Omnivium alongside Spawn of Possession and Exivious. It was later announced a year after that they inked a new North American record deal with Unique Leader Records, and released new details of their album A Perfect Absolution, which was released a month after its initial announcement. A year after the album's release, the band would headline the ninth annual Bloodletting North America tour. The band would also be seeing themselves part ways with their second drummer, Samuel Santiago.

On October 2, 2015, Gorod released studio footage for their album A Maze of Recycled Creeds, which would be released fourteen days later, as well as being their last release with Unique Leader. The band would follow up that success with another album Aethra, released October 2018.

In February 2022, the band released a new single "Victory" presumably from their new studio album. Two more singles would be released as follow-ups, "Breeding Silence" and "The Orb" released in July and September respectively. In February 2023, the band announced their seventh album, The Orb, would be released on March 10.

On May 18, 2026, the band announced that their eighth album, The Ember Gone, would be released on August 28, 2026 via Base Productions and Season of Mist. On June 12, 2026, the band then released their lead-single for the upcoming album, "Forgiveness", as well as an accompanying music video for the track.

== Band members ==
=== Current members ===
- Mathieu Pascal – guitar (1997–present)
- Benoit Claus – bass (1997–present)
- Julien "Nutz" Deyres – vocals (2010–present)
- Nicolas Alberny – guitar (2010–present)
- Karol Diers – drums (2014–present)

=== Former members ===
- Sandrine Bourguignon – drums (1997–2008)
- Guillaume Martinot – vocals (1997–2010)
- Arnaud Pontacq – guitar (2002–2010)
- Samuel Santiago – drums (2008–2013)

== Discography ==
Studio albums

- Neurotripsicks (2005)
- Leading Vision (2006)
- Process of a New Decline (2009)
- A Perfect Absolution (2012)
- A Maze of Recycled Creeds (2015)
- Æthra (2018)
- The Orb (2023)
- The Ember Gone (2026)

EPs

- Embalmed Madness split (2005)
- Transcendence (2011)
- Kiss the Freak (2017)

Demos

- Gorgasm Demo (2000)
- Promo 2002 (2002)
