= Light This City =

American melodic death metal band

- Origin: San Francisco, California, United States
- Genres: Melodic death metal
- Years active: 2002–2008, 2010, 2015, 2017–present
- Labels: Creator-Destructor Records, Reflections of Ruin, Prosthetic
- Members: Laura Nichol; Ben Murray; Steve Hoffman; Ryan Hansen; Jon Frost
- Past members: Band members

Light This City is an American melodic death metal band from the Bay Area of San Francisco, that has been active from 2002. The band is notable for the aggressive vocal approach of frontwoman Laura Nichol.

== History ==
Light This City's first album, The Hero Cycle, was released through Reflections on Ruin Records in 2003. Tyler Gamlen (guitars) and Ben Murray (drums) were the co-founders of Reflections of Ruin Records, and the album was also the label's first official release.

The band's next three albums — Remains of the Gods (2005), Facing the Thousand (2006), and Stormchaser (2008) — were released through Prosthetic Records.

In 2008, Light This City decided to disband. After disbanding, Laura Nichol (vocalist) and Ben Murray (drummer) formed a punk rock band called Heartsounds. Ryan Hansen (guitarist) and Jon Frost (bassist) formed the metal band The Urchin Barren.

In April 2010, Light This City played four reunion shows. Light This City played another reunion show on November 8, 2015 on the San Francisco date of Darkest Hour's 20th anniversary tour. In September 2017, following a 10-year hiatus, Light This City announced that the band had reformed and was working on completing a new album through Creator-Destructor Records. The resulting album, Terminal Bloom, was released on 25 May 2018.

Light This City's albums have featured collaborations with musicians such as Chuck Billy of Testament ("Firehaven" off Stormchaser), and Trevor Strnad of The Black Dahlia Murder ("Fear of Heights" off Facing the Thousand).

== Band members ==
=== Current members ===
- Laura Nichol – vocals (2002–2008, 2010, 2015, 2017–present)
- Ben Murray – drums (2002–2008, 2010, 2015, 2017–present), guitars (2003–2005)
- Steve Hoffman – guitar (2005–2007, 2010, 2015, 2017–present)
- Ryan Hansen – guitar (2007–2008, 2010, 2015, 2017–present)
- Jon Frost – bass (2007–2008, 2010, 2015, 2017–present)

=== Previous members ===
- Mike Dias – bass (2002–2006)
- Alex Tomasino – guitar (2002)
- Tyler Gamlen – guitar (2002–2003)
- Steven Shirley – guitar (2002–2003)
- Joey Ellis – guitar (2004)
- Brian Forbes – guitar (2006–2008)
- Dan Kenny – bass (2006–2007)

Timeline

== Discography ==
- The Hero Cycle (2003, Reflections of Ruin Records)
- Remains of the Gods (2005, Prosthetic Records)
- Facing the Thousand (2006, Prosthetic Records)
- Stormchaser (2008, Prosthetic Records)
- Light This City - Digital Collection (2017, Prosthetic Records)
- Terminal Bloom (2018, Creator-Destructor Records)

== See also ==
- List of melodic death metal bands
- List of female heavy metal singers
