= Trample the Weak, Hurdle the Dead =

Studio album by Skinless
- Released: June 13th, 2006
- Recorded: December 2005
- Genre: Brutal death metal
- Length: 36:40
- Label: Relapse Records
- Producers: Brett Portzer and Skinless

Skinless chronology
From Sacrifice to Survival (2003)	Trample the Weak, Hurdle the Dead (2006)	Only the Ruthless Remain (2015)

Professional ratings
Review scores
Source	Rating
Collector's Guide to Heavy Metal	8/10

Trample the Weak, Hurdle the Dead is the fourth studio album by American death metal band Skinless. It is the only album to feature vocalist Jason Keyser, as well as the band's only album without vocalist Sherwood Webber IV.

The album art features first person point of view of Noah Carpenter wearing a gas mask pointing a rifle at them, perhaps even stabbing the onlooker with an attached bayonet.

== Track listing ==
All tracks are written by Jason Keyser and Noah Carpenter.

No.	Title	Length
1.	"Overlord"	4:06
2.	"A Unilateral Disgust"	4:15
3.	"Deviation Will Not Be Tolerated"	5:27
4.	"Trample the Weak, Hurdle the Dead"	4:10
5.	"Spoils of the Sycophant"	3:53
6.	"Endvisioned"	4:41
7.	"Execution of Reason"	4:21
8.	"Wicked World (Black Sabbath cover)"	5:46
Total length:		36:40

== Notes ==
The first track, "Overlord," starts with a sample from Caesar's climactic speech from Conquest of the Planet of the Apes. The sample at the start of the next track, "A Unilateral Disgust," is from Hot Shots! Part Deux. The sample at the start of "Trample the Weak, Hurdle the Dead" is from Patton. The fifth sample is at the end of track seven, "Execution of Reason," which is from Mystery Science Theater 3000 - The Touch of Satan episode. The tour in support of the album included headlining the final Metal for the Brain Festival in Canberra, Australia.

== Line up ==
- Jason Keyser – vocals
- Joe Keyser – bass
- Noah Carpenter – guitar
- Bob Beaulac – drums
