= The Conductor's Departure =

Studio album by Anata
- Released: June 19, 2006
- Recorded: 2005
- Genres: Melodic death metal, technical death metal
- Length: 53:40
- Label: Earache Records

Anata chronology
Under a Stone With No Inscription (2004)	The Conductor's Departure (2006)

Professional ratings
Review scores
Source	Rating
AllMusic	3.5/5 stars
Exclaim!	favorable
Metal Storm	8.6/10
Sputnikmusic	4/5 stars

The Conductor's Departure is Anata's fourth full-length album. It was released by Earache Records.

== Track listing ==
No.	Title	Length
1.	"Downward Spiral into Madness"	5:28
2.	"Complete Demise"	4:29
3.	"Better Grieved Than Fooled"	5:57
4.	"The Great Juggler"	6:00
5.	"Cold Heart Forged in Hell"	5:00
6.	"I Would Dream of Blood"	5:30
7.	"Disobedience Pays"	5:19
8.	"Children's Laughter"	1:44
9.	"Renunciation"	5:44
10.	"The Conductor's Departure"	8:29

== Personnel ==
- Fredrik Schälin – vocals, guitar
- Andreas Allenmark – guitar
- Henrik Drake – bass
- Conny Pettersson – drums
