= Arven (band) =

German symphonic metal band

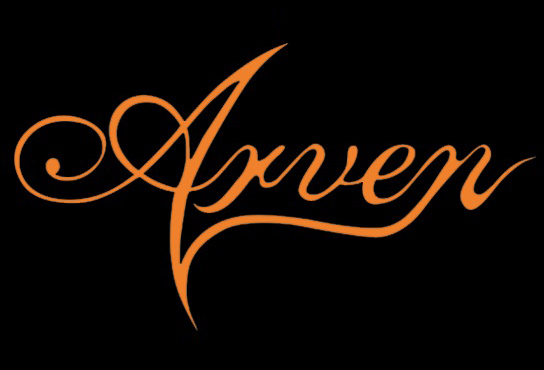

Background information
- Origin: Frankfurt, Germany
- Genres: Symphonic metal
- Years active: 2006–2015
- Label: Massacre Records
- Past members: Anastasia Schmidt; Lena Yatsula; Carina Hanselmann; Lisa Geiß; Till Felden; Eva Kreuzer; Reseda Streb; Verena Reinhardt; Ines Thomé

Arven was a German symphonic metal band from Frankfurt that has released two studio albums to date. The group referred to their style as 'Melodic metal'.

== History ==
Arven was founded in 2006 by guitarist and songwriter Anastasia Schmidt. Looking for female musicians, keyboard player Lena Yatsula and guitarist Ines Thomé joined the band. For the vocals, the classically trained Carina Hanselmann was added. In May 2009, bassist Lisa Marie Geiss replaced Eve Kreuzer. As the only man of the sextet, drummer Till Felden joined the band.

In 2011, Arven signed a record contract with Massacre Records. Their debut album, Music of Light, was published on 30 September 2011. The album was mastered by Sascha Paeth and Michael Rodenberg. The album cover was designed by Jan Yrlund. The second album Black Is the Colour was released on 23 August 2013.

In 2015, Arven announced in their official website that they have officially disbanded due to musical differences and difficulties finding a replacement for the guitarist Ines Thomé, who left the band.

== Band members ==
Final known lineup

- Lisa Geiß – bass
- Till Felden – drums
- Lena Yatsula – keyboards
- Carina Hanselmann – vocals
- Anastasia Schmidt – guitars (2006–present)

Former

- Verena Reinhardt – bass guitar (?–2009)
- Eva Kreuzer – bass guitar, vocals
- Ines Thomé – guitarist (?–2014)
- Reseda Streb – vocals

Live

- Benjamin Reiter – bass guitar (2010–2011), guitarist (2013–2015)

== Discography ==
Studio albums

- Music of Light (2011)
- Black Is the Colour (2013)
