= The New Dominion =

Dutch death metal band

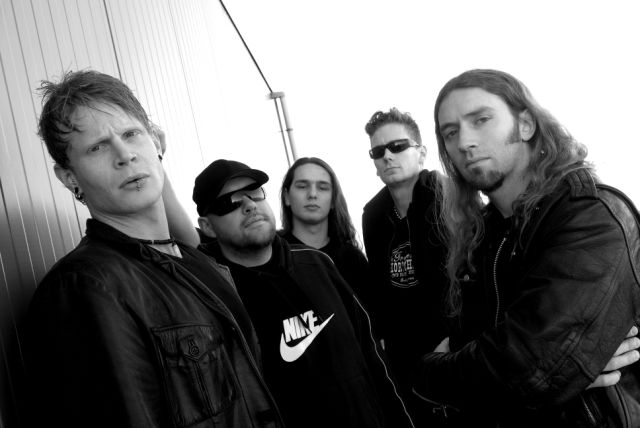
- The New Dominion in 2007 at Westpoint Tower; Left to right: Bart Schoorl, Marc van Stiphout, Yuma van Eekelen, Michiel Oskam, Tom Adams

Background information
- Origin: Tilburg, Netherlands
- Genres: Death metal, Melodic death metal, Technical death metal
- Years active: 2006–2014
- Labels: Neurotic Records
- Members: Bart Schoorl; Tom Adams; Michiel Oskam; Marc van Stiphout; Yuma van Eekelen
- Website: www.thenewdominionband.com

The New Dominion is a Dutch death metal band from Tilburg, formed in 2006. While their style is originally rooted in Scandinavian death metal, The New Dominion has consistently incorporated progressive and technical influences into their riff oriented compositions.

== History ==
=== Formation and …And Black Gleams The Eye… (2006-2008) ===
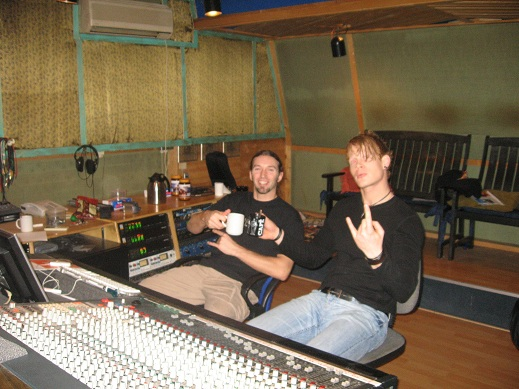
Both Tom Adams and Bart Schoorl (pictured) wanted to form a more heavy-sounding band after both their recent bands got split up due to musical differences.

Tom Adams and Bart Schoorl got to talk about their passion of death/thrash metal as volunteers at 013, a pop/rock venue in Tilburg. Tom had contacted Yuma van Eekelen which he knew as a friend from the singer of his last band. In the meantime Bart had spoken to his friend Marc van Stiphout about a potential new formation. A month later after Tom and Yuma had finished their first song (eventually called “the homecoming”) Stip and Bart came over to the rehearsal room in 013 and immediately were enthusiastic and a new band was born. However, within a month it became clear that in order to deliver first-class quality death/thrash songs that offered enough variety, the recruitment of a second guitar player was inevitable. After a six-month quest this musician was found in the person of Michiel Oskam, an old schoolmate of Tom Adams. Not only with his unique playing skills, but also with his personality, Michiel proved to be the right man for the job.

After writing six songs The New Dominion recorded its first demo, …And Black Gleams The Eye. The demo was recorded with producer Tymon Kruidenier in January 2007. Yuma knew Tymon because they were schoolmates at that time. They both studied at the music arts department of the Utrecht School of the Arts (HKU).

During the recordings of their first demo The New Dominion participated in a national metal contest in which they competed with 45 other bands. After 2 months and 3 rounds - the metal-battle – had been won. Meanwhile, the demo was released and The New Dominion got to do a number of shows with international known artists like Nile, Six feet under, Behemoth and Finntroll. This eventually led to a record deal with Neurotic Records. On the website of Neurotic Records - Ruud Lemmen - Neurotics boss stated: “Considering the history of Neurotic Records, our latest signing The New Dominion, is probably one of the most remarkable ones to this date. This band performs fluently executed death/thrash metal, incorporating a wide array of influences from various genres. In the past year The New Dominion stormed over the Dutch club scene in an insane tempo, leaving a trail of ashes and dust behind everywhere they went.”

=== …And Kindling Deadly Slumber (2008-2009) ===
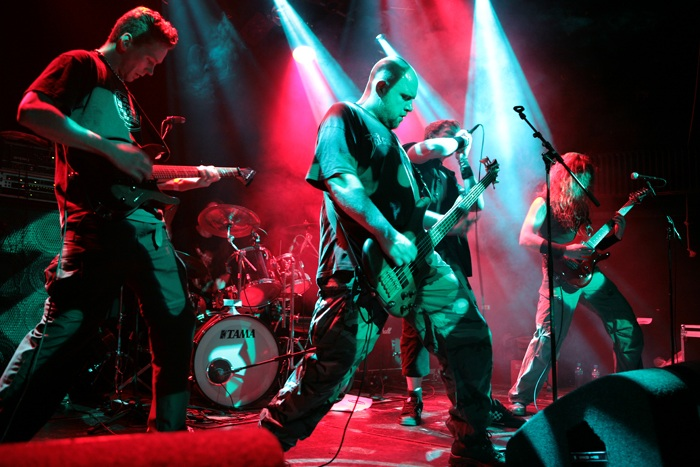
Live at 013 Thrashfest in Tilburg.

Late 2008, after building a live reputation in the Netherlands, the band went into the studio to record their first full-length album. Again with producer Tymon Kruidenier who started his own studio at that time and is also known as guitarist of Exivious and Ex-guitarist of Cynic. The album was mastered by producer Jacob Hansen and the artwork was done by Hrödger Design.

Immediately after the album was released by Neurotic Records in March 2009, The New Dominion was invited to go on their first European tour with old school death metal band Pestilence and Norwegian black metal band Vreid. Shortly after the tour Yuma van Eekelen replaced Peter Wildoer as the new drummer of Pestilence.

=== Future (2011–present) ===
After a year and a half of writing and developing new compositions the band is going to record a second album coming winter. They will start with the drum recordings in the Excess Studios in Rotterdam. All other recordings will be at the Final Focus Studios in Tilburg where Bart Hennephof (also guitarist in the band Textures) and Yuma van Eekelen will be producing and mixing the album.

== Musical style and influences ==
The New Dominion's musical style is characterized by fast riffing and up-tempo drums. Vocal wise both death grunts/growls are interchanged with screams. Incidentally whispering and clean vocals are added when required. It's in the nature of the band to continually improve themselves technically, but with a clear logical song structure in mind. Influences vary from Hypocrisy to Tool, from The Haunted to Cannibal Corpse and from Gojira to Meshuggah.

== Band members ==
Name	Instrument	Membership	Additional information
Bart Schoorl	vocals	since 2006	Main writer of lyrics.
Tom Adams	guitar	since 2006	Songwriter. Ex-Conquestador guitarist.
Michiel Oskam	guitar	since 2007	Songwriter and plays&writes most of the solos. Also plays guitar in Operation Sand and wrote a solo album "The Onyx Set Aglow ".
Marc van Stiphout	bass	since 2006	Also plays bass in Flesh Made Sin & Antropomorphia.
Yuma van Eekelen	drums	since 2006	Songwriter and Ex-Brutus drummer. Also plays drums in Pestilence. Owner and producer of Final Focus Studios.

== Discography ==
Studio albums

- …And Black Gleams The Eye (2007)
- …And Kindling Deadly Slumber (2009)
- Procreating the Undivine (2013)
