= First Breath =

Studio album by Mercenary
- Released: 12 January 1998
- Recorded: Aabenraa Studio, Denmark
- Genre: Melodic death metal, death metal
- Length: 63:11
- Label: Hammerheart Records / Serious Entertainment
- Producer: Jacob Hansen

Mercenary chronology
Supremacy (EP) (1996)	First Breath (1998)	Everblack (2002)

First Breath is the debut studio album by Danish melodic death metal band Mercenary. With this album, the band showed their death metal roots. First Breath was recorded at the Aabenraa Studio in Denmark.

== Track listing ==
All tracks are written by Mercenary.

No.	Title	Length
1.	"Symbiotic"	4:11
2.	"World Wide Weep"	4:41
3.	"Horizon"	8:00
4.	"Master Game"	5:06
5.	"Perceptive"	6:26
6.	"Graveart"	4:24
7.	"Next to Nothing"	3:45
8.	"Demon8"	6:48
9.	"Watching Me"	4:38
10.	"Alternative Ways"	3:52
11.	"Sister Jane"	5:54
12.	"Supremacy" (bonus track from Supremacy EP (1996))	5:21

== Personnel ==
- Nikolaj Brinkmann – lead guitar
- Jakob Mølbjerg – rhythm guitar
- Henrik "Kral" Andersen – unclean vocals, bass
- Rasmus Jacobsen – drums

Guest appearances

- Irene Poulsen – clean vocals on "Horizon" and "Sister Jane"
- Jakob Sivsgård – keyboards on "Horizon" and "Demon8"

Production

- Produced and engineered by Jacob Hansen
- Mixed by Jacob Hansen and Kræn Meier
