= Bloodsoaked =

American death metal band

- Origin: Raleigh, North Carolina
- Genres: Death metal
- Years active: 2006–present
- Labels: Comatose Music
- Members: Peter Hasselbrack Craig Harley Schmuhl
- Past members: Joseph Darling

Bloodsoaked is an American death metal band from North Carolina. Formed in 2006 by Peter Hasselbrack as a one-man project, Bloodsoaked is known for a style of death metal strongly inspired by the originators of the style, such as Death, Cannibal Corpse, Obituary, Deicide, Sepultura and Morbid Angel.

== Background ==
Bloodsoaked’s music is best described as old-school death metal with some modern influences. The lyrics tend to be heavily gore and horror influenced as well as anti-religious views. Their band name came from the underground death metal web site Bloodsoaked Promotions that ran from 1996 to 2004 as well as Bloodsoaked Records, both created and run by Peter Hasselbrack.

== History ==
Peter started Bloodsoaked, and in February 2007 signed to Comatose Music and released their first album Brutally Butchered in April 2007. Their second album Sadistic Deeds... Grotesque Memories was released on Comatose Music in April 2009. Their third album The Death of Hope was released in August 2011 on Comatose Music and features guest guitar solos by James Murphy. Both Sadistic Deeds... Grotesque Memories and The Death of Hope were mixed and mastered by Shane McFee, who also programmed drums for both albums. The Death of Hope was recorded at The Basement Studio with Jamie King. In February 2012 Bloodsoaked added Joseph Darling as second guitarist/vocalist. September 2014 Bloodsoaked released Religious Apocalypse on Comatose music. In 2015 Joseph left the band leaving Bloodsoaked a one-man band again. In 2018 Bloodsoaked released Desolate Paradise as a digital only (download/streaming) album.

== Press coverage ==
- In June 2009 Bloodsoaked broke into the Top 40 CMJ Loud Rock charts at number 39 and peaked at number 36.
- On January 19, 2010 the video for the song "Rotting in Filth" aired on MTV’s Headbangers Ball.
- The June 2010 issue of Decibel Magazine featured a Bloodsoaked cover story called “Death on Two Legs”.
- The September 2011 issue of Decibel Magazine had a Bloodsoaked Upfront Profile feature.

== Albums ==
- Brutally Butchered (2007)
- Sadistic Deeds… Grotesque Memories (2009)
- The Death of Hope (2011)
- Religious Apocalypse (2014)
- Desolate Paradise (2018)

== Members ==
- Peter Hasselbrack – guitar, vocals (2006–present)
- Craig Harley Schmuhl - vocals (2018–present)
- Joseph Darling – guitar, vocals (2012–2014)

== Videography ==
- "Rotting in Filth" (2008). Director: Blake Faucette
- "Unborn Horror" (2009). Director: Blake Faucette
- "Suicide" (2009). Director: Blake Faucette
- "No God" (2011). Director: Jesse Knight
- "Infestation" (2011). Director: Jesse Knight
- "Religious Apocalypse" (2014). Director: Blake Faucette
