= Communic =

Norwegian progressive metal band

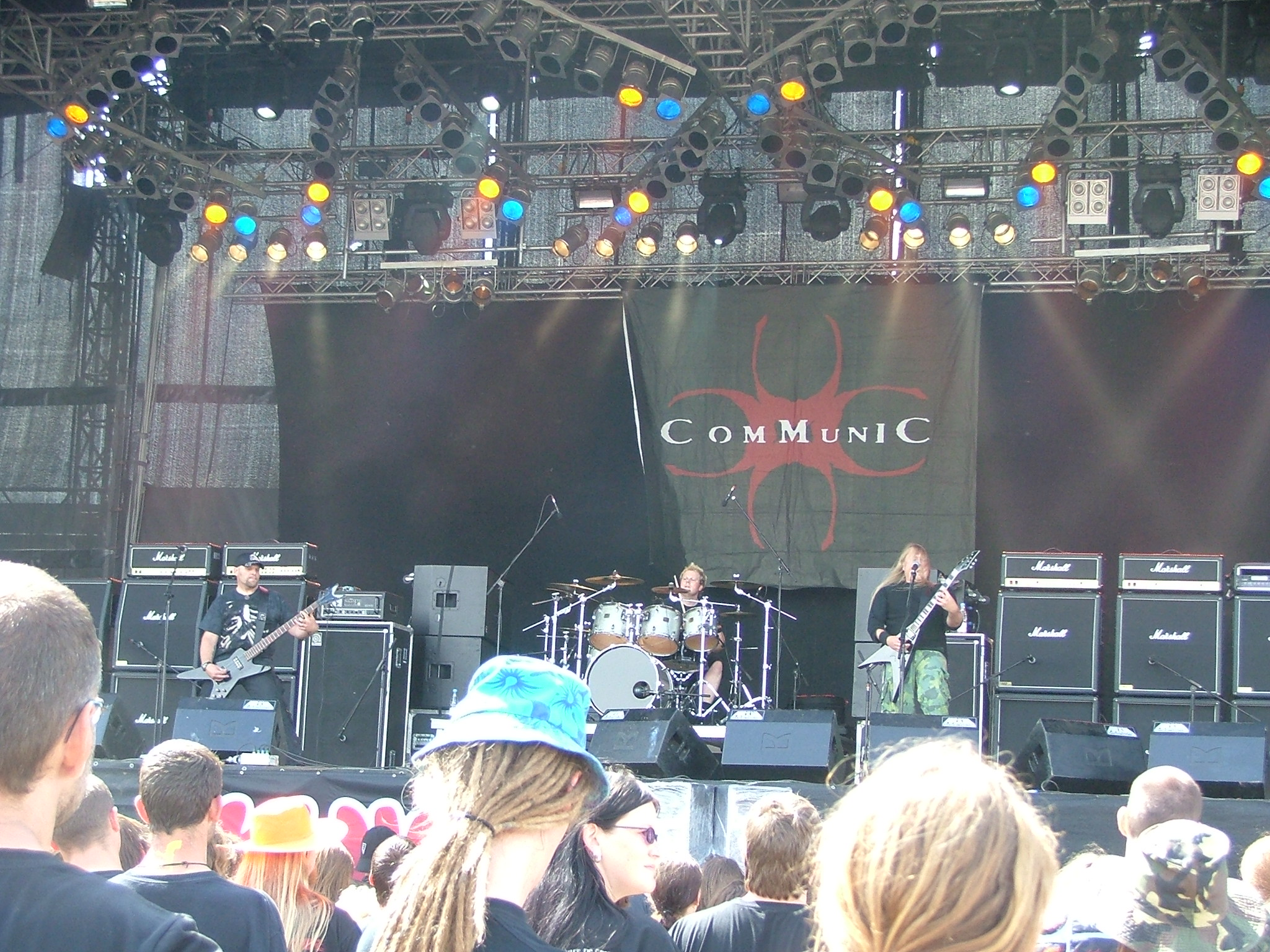
- Communic in 2007

Background information
- Origin: Mandal and Kristiansand, Norway
- Genres: Progressive metal, power metal, thrash metal
- Years active: 2003-present
- Labels: AFM, Nuclear Blast
- Members: Oddleif Stensland; Erik Mortensen; Tor Atle Andersen
- Website: www.communic.org

Communic is a Norwegian progressive metal band from Mandal and Kristiansand, formed in 2003.

== History ==
Communic was founded in March 2003 as a side project for Oddleif Stensland, guitarist, and Tor Atle Andersen, drummer, both from the band Scariot. Soon after, they were joined by bassist Erik Mortensen, who had been a bandmate of Stensland in a band called Ingermanland. In January 2004, the band recorded its first three demo tracks at dUb Studios in Norway. While only 100 copies of the Conspiracy in Mind demo were printed, it would be selected as Demo of the Month by the magazine Rock Hard in April. In March they signed with the Danish management company Intromental Management. In April, Stensland left Scariot to concentrate full-time on Communic.

In July 2004, Communic signed with the German label Nuclear Blast and in September began recording their debut album, Conspiracy in Mind in the Denmark studios of producer Jacob Hansen. Danish keyboardist Peter Jensen (ex-Sinphonia) played keyboards for the album. It was released on February 21, 2005, and received good reviews, being voted as "Album of the Month" in the magazines Rock Hard and Heavy, Oder Was!?. Following the album's release, Communic toured Europe with Ensiferum and Graveworm, including an appearance at the Gelsenkirchen Rock Hard Festival. Jensen joined the band on the tour, but was not made a permanent member as he did not live in Norway.

In early 2006, the band flew once again to Denmark to record the follow-up to Conspiracy in Mind in Jacob Hansen's studios. This time, Norwegian Endre Kirkesola was brought in to record the keyboard parts in the album. Unlike Jensen, Kirkesola did not tour with the band to promote the album. The album, Waves of Visual Decay, was released in May 2006 and, like its predecessor, also received good critical reviews, being selected as Album of the Month in Rock Hard. The band has since released four more albums; Payment of Existence (2008), The Bottom Deep (2011), Where Echoes Gather (2017), and Hiding from the World (2020).

== Members ==
- Oddleif Stensland—vocals and guitars
- Erik Mortensen—bass
- Tor Atle Andersen—drums

== Discography ==
- Conspiracy in Mind (2005)
- Waves of Visual Decay (2006)
- Payment of Existence (2008)
- The Bottom Deep (2011)
- Where Echoes Gather (2017)
- Hiding from the World (2020)
