= Everblack (Mercenary album) =

Studio album by Mercenary
- Released: 11 March 2002
- Recorded: Aabenraa Studio, Denmark
- Genre: Melodic death metal; power metal
- Length: 53:45
- Label: Hammerheart Records
- Producer: Jacob Hansen

Mercenary chronology
| First Breath (1998) | Everblack (2002) | 11 Dreams (2004) |

Everblack is the second studio album by Danish melodic death metal band Mercenary, and the second through Hammerheart Records. It is the first album to include future lead singer Mikkel Sandager and his brother Morten Sandager on keyboards. This is also the only album to feature Signar Petersen on lead guitars and the last to feature Rasmus Jacobsen on drums. With this album, Mercenary continued along with their death metal roots, but also started to explore their sound with power metal elements, as well as clean vocals done by Mikkel Sandager.

== Track listing ==
All tracks are written by Mercenary.

| No. | Title | Length |
|---|---|---|
| 1. | "Intro" | 0:32 |
| 2. | "Everblack" | 4:50 |
| 3. | "Seize the Night" | 6:39 |
| 4. | "Screaming from the Heavens" | 6:55 |
| 5. | "Dead.com" | 5:42 |
| 6. | "Darkspeed" | 4:50 |
| 7. | "Bloodrush" | 6:30 |
| 8. | "A Darker Shade of Black" | 5:02 |
| 9. | "Bulletblues" | 2:48 |
| 10. | "Rescue Me" | 5:05 |
| 11. | "Alliance + Outro" | 4:46 |

Bonus track
| No. | Title | Length |
|---|---|---|
| 12. | "Nothing's What It Seems" | 7:12 |

== Personnel ==
- Jakob Mølbjerg – rhythm guitar
- Mikkel Sandager – clean vocals
- Henrik "Kral" Andersen – death growls, bass
- Morten Sandager – keyboards
- Rasmus Jacobsen – drums
- Signar Petersen – lead guitar

Produced, arranged, mixed, and mastered by Jacob Hansen. Art by Travis Smith.
