= Facing the Thousand =

Studio album by Light This City
- Released: September 19, 2006
- Recorded: March/April 2006 at Castle Ultimate Studios in Emeryvile, CA
- Genre: Melodic death metal
- Length: 40:59
- Label: Prosthetic
- Producer: Zack Ohren, Light This City

Light This City chronology
Remains of the Gods (2005)	Facing the Thousand (2006)	Stormchaser (2008)

Professional ratings
Review scores
Source	Rating
Allmusic	4/5 stars

Facing the Thousand is the third album by American melodic death metal band Light This City.

== Track listing ==
No.	Title	Length
1.	"Facing The Thousand"	5:00
2.	"Cradle for a King"	3:44
3.	"The Unwelcome Saviour"	3:17
4.	"Exile"	5:08
5.	"Maddening Swarm"	3:29
6.	"City of Snares"	4:15
7.	"The Eagle"	3:25
8.	"Fear of Heights"	4:55
9.	"Tracks of Decay"	3:50
10.	"Like Every Song's Our Last"	2:58
Total length:		40:59

== Personnel ==
Facing the Thousand album personnel as listed on Allmusic.

Light This City

- Laura Nichol – vocals
- Brian Forbes – guitar
- Steve Hoffman – guitar
- Mike Dias – bass
- Ben Murray – drums

Additional musicians

- Trevor Strnad – Vocals on "Fear of Heights" (Frontman of The Black Dahlia Murder)
- Alfred Lord Tennyson – Composer

Artwork and design

- Mario Garza – Design, layout design
- Jeremy Saffer – Photography

Production and recording

- Zack Ohren -assistant engineering, mastering, mixing, production
