= God Dethroned =

Dutch extreme metal band

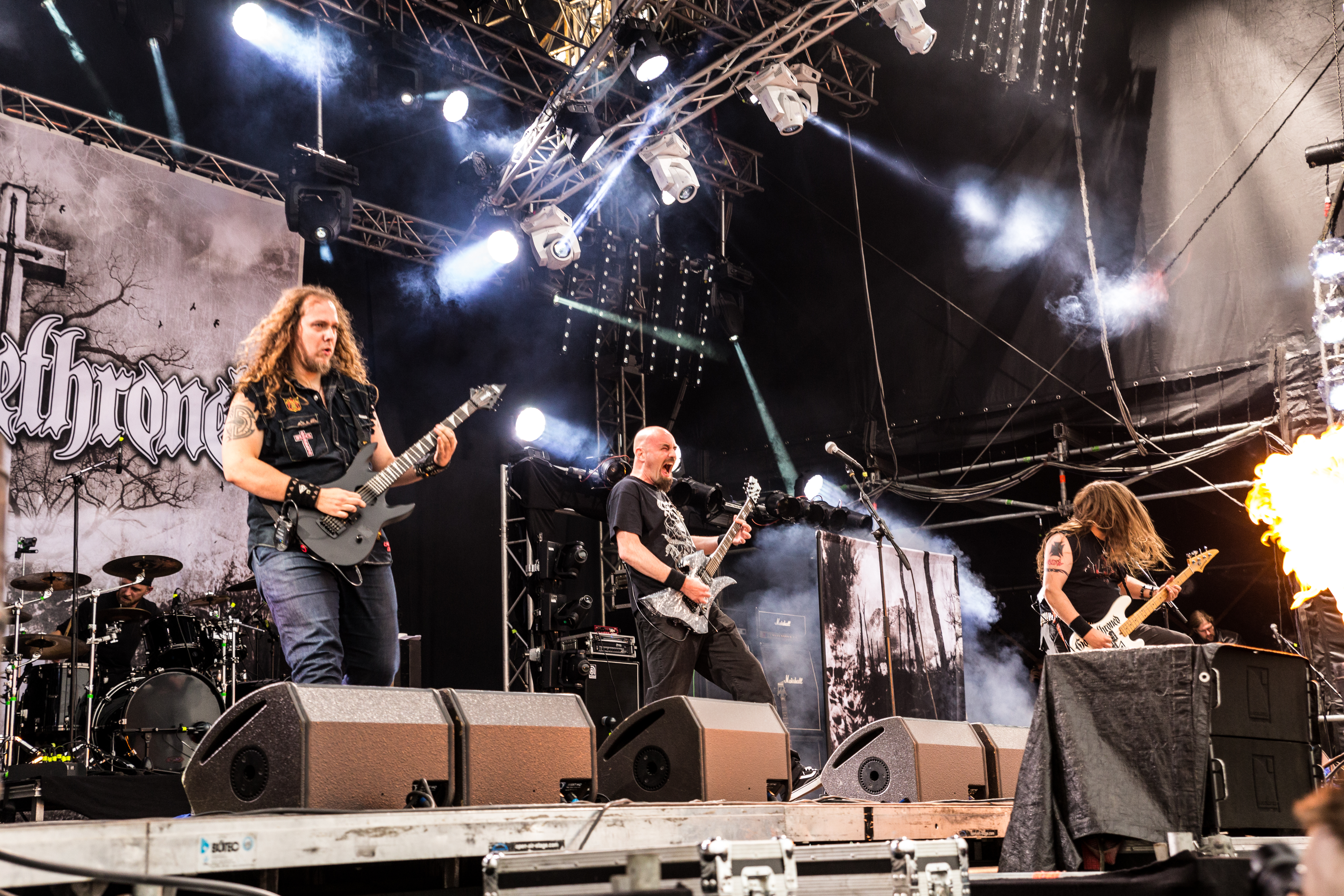
- God Dethroned at Party.San Metal Open Air 2017

Background information
- Origin: Beilen, Netherlands
- Genres: Blackened death metal; melodic black/death; death metal (early)
- Years active: 1990–1993; 1996–2011; 2014–present
- Labels: Shark Records; Metal Blade; American
- Members: Henri "T.S.K." Sattler; Michiel Van Der Plicht; Jeroen Pomper; Dave Meester
- Past members: Former members
- Website: goddethroned.com

God Dethroned is a Dutch death metal band from Beilen, formed in 1990.

Some consider their 1999 album Bloody Blasphemy among the best albums released on Metal Blade Records.

== Biography ==
Singer and guitar player Henri Sattler, Hans Leegstra (guitar), and Ard de Weerd formed God Dethroned in 1990. Sattler and Leegstra had been in Dysentery. Leegstra quit music after the band formed. They recorded the demo Christ Hunt in 1991, after which bassist Marco Arends joined. German label Shark Records released their first album, The Christhunt. Arends left to rejoin Altar and Marcel Beukeveld replaced him. The Christhunt did poorly. The label refused to feature a dissected rat on the cover and did not promote the record. God Dethroned went on hiatus the following year, partly because Sattler's anti-Christianity was not shared by all. Sattler formed Ministry of Terror. In 1996, after that band's 1994 album Fall of Life and a supporting European tour with Impaled Nazarene, Sattler reformed God Dethroned with guitarist Jens van der Valk, who did not share Sattler's anti-Christian views either, bassist Beef, and drummer Roel Sanders. This lineup signed with Metal Blade and issued The Grand Grimoire in Europe in 1997. The album was released in the U.S. the following year, with a re-issue of The Christhunt, which featured the original dissected-rat cover art.

The Grand Grimorie did better than The Christhunt. Sattler, Van Der Valk, Beef, and Sanders recorded Bloody Blasphemy, which many fans consider their best work. Successful tours and shows with Marduk, Immortal, and Deicide followed. Sanders left the band after Bloody Blasphemy and Puerto Rican drummer Tony Laureano replaced him. Laureano played with the band until 2003, when he joined American death metal band Nile. He recorded one album with the band, 2001's Ravenous.

Drummer Ariën Van Weesenbeek joined the band, and they entered the studio at the end of 2002 to record Into the Lungs of Hell. Beef and Jens tired of the band's direction and wanted a heavier, more extreme sound with more anti-Christian lyrics, which had faded to an extent on Ravenous. Sattler wanted a melodic, darker sound with lyrics focused on horror and nihilism. After the recording and a short amount of touring for Into the Lungs of Hell, the bassist and guitarist left the band. Sattler recruited bassist Henk Zinger, and Ariën van Weesenbeek recommended Belgian guitarist Isaac Delahaye. This lineup finished the remaining tour dates and recorded 2004's The Lair of the White Worm.

After touring for a while, the band went back into the studio with producer Rick Rubin and released The Toxic Touch in 2006 through American Recordings.

In January 2008, drummer Roel Sanders replaced Ariën van Weesenbeek, who joined Dutch symphonic metal band Epica in December 2007. They recorded and released Passiondale in 2009. The album's concept was based on The Battle of Passchendaele during World War I. Once the album was completed, Susan Gerl became the new guitar player. Shortly after the release, Roel Sanders left the band and Michiel Van Der Plicht was brought in.

In 2010, Sattler stated in a Metal Blade Press release,

"We are halfway through the writing process for a new album, which we will record starting end of May. First, we'll play on the Killfest tour in the U.S. supporting Overkill together with label mates Woe of Tyrants and many other great bands. Abigail Williams' axeman Ian Jekelis will take over touring duties for Susan, with whom we parted ways last January. We will announce the name of our new shredder right before we play our first European festival in May"

Shortly after, they announced new lead guitarist Danny Tunker (Prostitute Disfigurement, Detonation).

God Dethroned released Under The Sign Of The Iron Cross through Metal Blade on 22 November 2010. It met positive reviews. God Dethroned became 'Album Of The Month' in the Netherlands' Aardschok magazine for the first time.

Sattler announced that 2011 would be the band's last year and their final show would be in December. They performed at 70000 Tons of Metal festival in January 2012, after which they officially disbanded.

Sattler announced that the band would reunite in 2015, performing at the 70,000 Tons of Metal Festival in January. While there would only be a "small selection of shows," according to Sattler, the band had more shows planned for 2015. God Dethroned played many shows, and in 2017 they recorded The World Ablaze.

The World Ablaze was the third album of the band's World War I trilogy. The album got high ranks in metal charts. With lead guitarist Mike Ferguson and bass guitarist Jeroen Pomper, God Dethroned released Illuminati on 7 February 2020.

The Judas Paradox was released on 6 September 2024.

== Musical style ==
God Dethroned formed as a death metal band. When they reformed in 1996, they switched to blackened death metal until Into the Lungs of Hell, when they shifted to melodic death metal. They are "an important part of the Dutch black metal scene", according to The Encyclopedia of Dutch Black Metal. Their latest albums returned to blackened death metal.

== Members ==
God Dethroned, live at With Full Force 2018

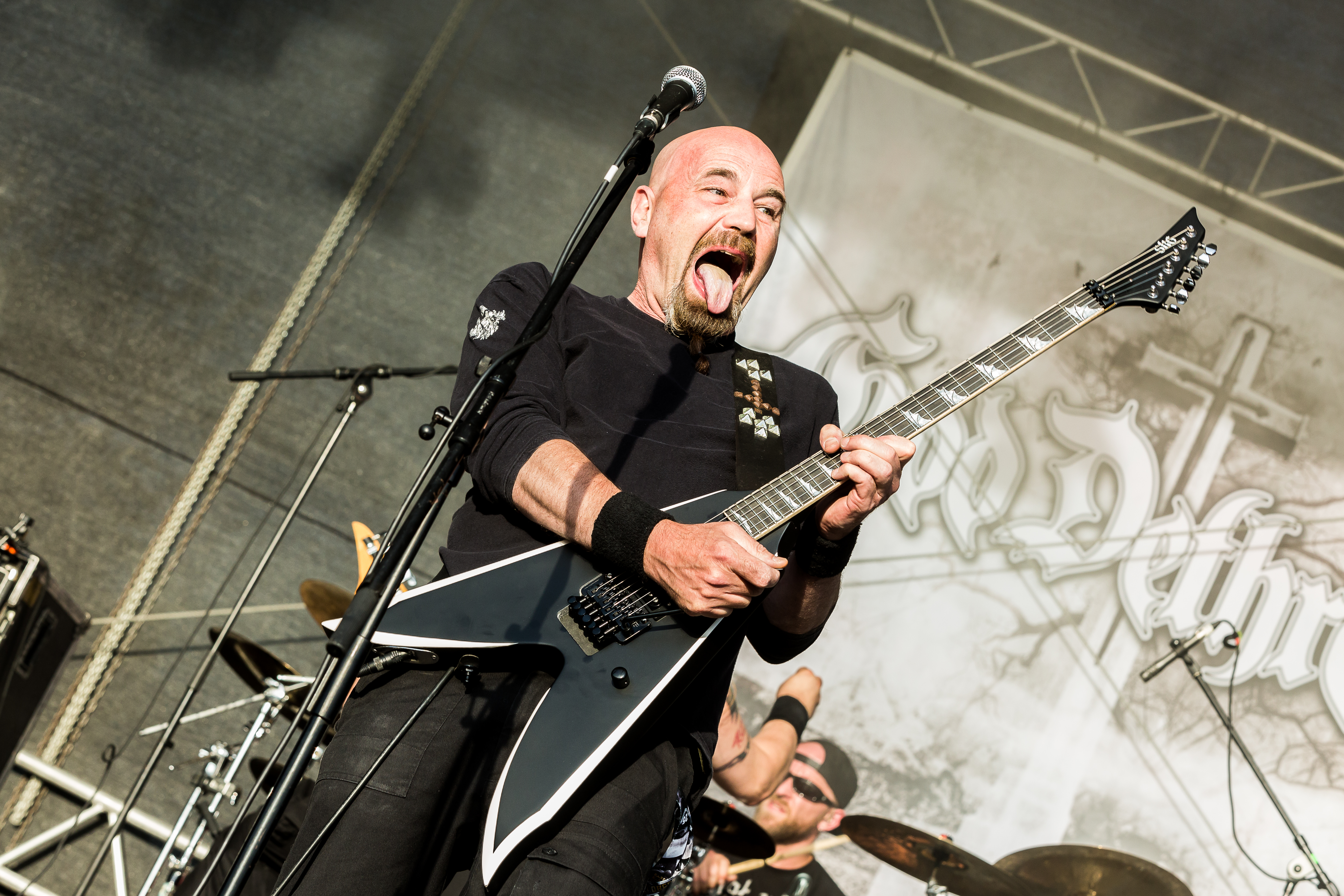
Vocalist and rhythm guitarist Henri Sattler

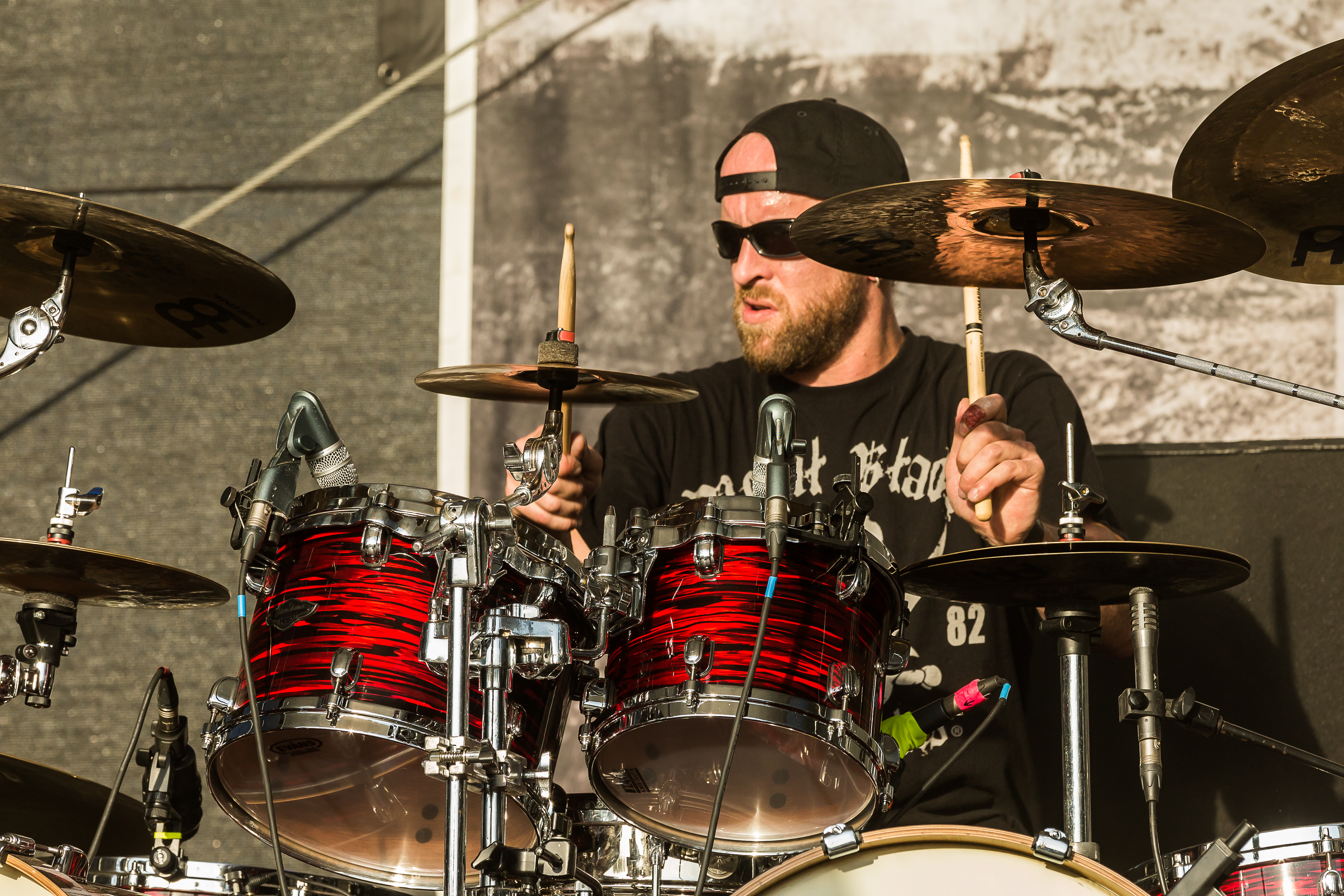
Drummer Michiel Van Der Plicht

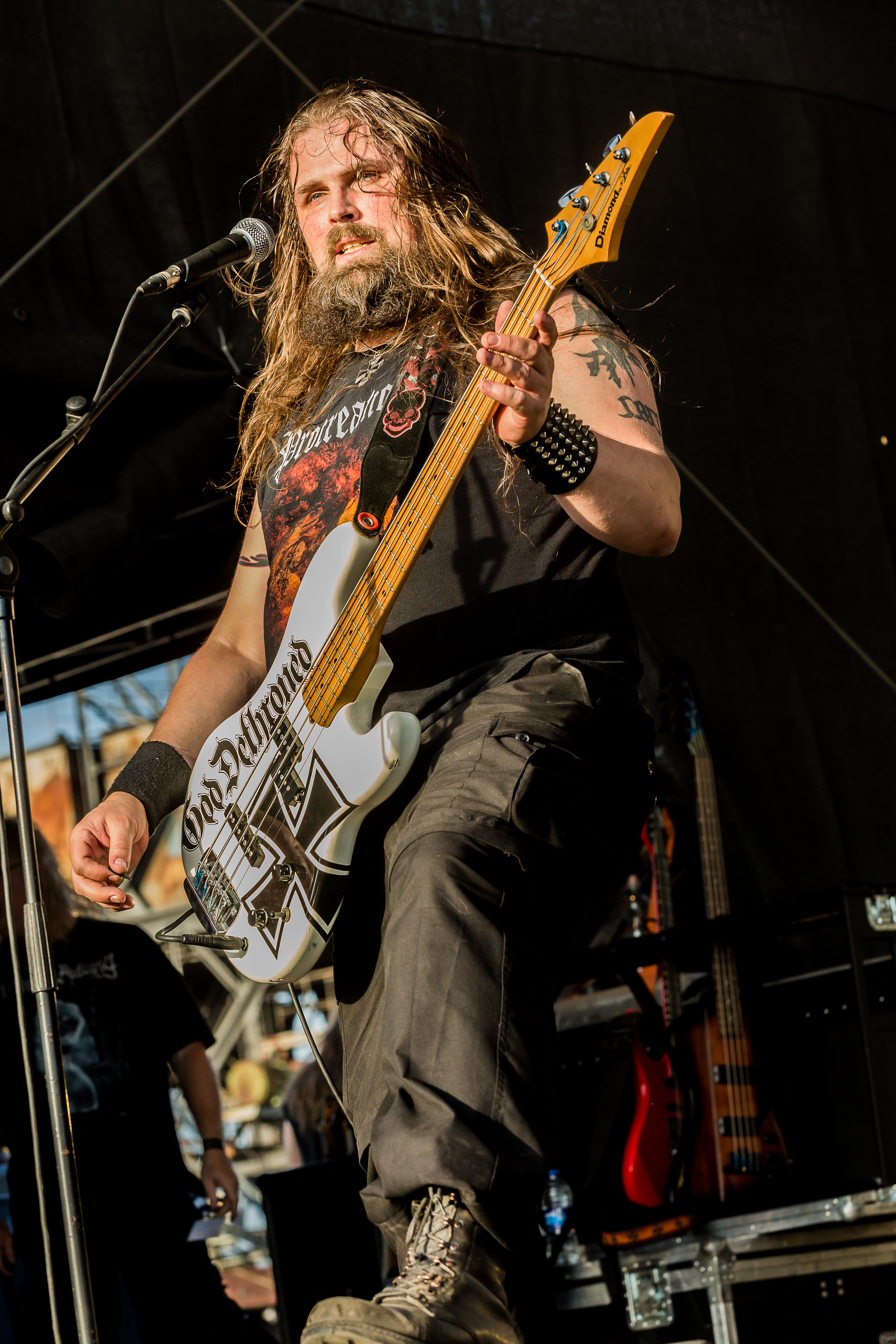
Bassist Jeroen Pomper

Current Lineup

- Henri "T.S.K." Sattler - vocals, rhythm guitar (1991-1993, 1996-2012, 2015-present)
- Jeroen Pomper - bass (2015–present)
- Dave Meester - lead guitar (2019–present)
- Frank 'Skillpero' Schilperoort - drums (2020–present)

Former members

- Ard de Weerd - drums (1991-1993)
- Hans Leegstra - lead guitar (1991-1993)
- Marco Barends - bass (1991-1992)
- Marcel Beukeveld - bass (1992-1993; died 2016)
- Jens van der Valk - lead guitar (1996-2003)
- Beef - bass (1996-2003)
- Roel Sanders - drums (1996-1999, 2008-2009)
- Tony Laureano - drums (1999-2001)
- Ariën van Weesenbeek - drums (2001-2008)
- Isaac Delahaye - lead guitar (2003-2009)
- Susan Gerl - lead guitar (2009-2010)
- Danny Tunker - lead guitar (2010-2012)
- Henk Zinger - bass (2003-2012)
- Mike Ferguson - lead guitar (2015-2019)
- Michiel Van Der Plicht - drums (2009-2012, 2015-2020)

Touring musicians

- Ian Jekelis - lead guitar (2010-2015)

== Discography ==
- The Christhunt (1992)
- The Grand Grimoire (1997)
- Bloody Blasphemy (1999)
- Ravenous (2001)
- Into the Lungs of Hell (2003)
- The Lair of the White Worm (2004)
- The Toxic Touch (2006)
- Passiondale (2009)
- Under the Sign of the Iron Cross (2010)
- The World Ablaze (2017)
- Illuminati (2020)
- The Judas Paradox (2024)

=== Music videos ===
- Necromagnon (1992)
- Under the Golden Wings of Death (1999)
- Villa Vampiria (2001)
- The Lair of the White Worm (2004)
- Poison Fog (2009)
- On the Wrong Side of the Wire (2017)
- The World Ablaze (2017)
- Annihilation Crusade (2017)
- Illuminati (2019)
- Spirit of Beezelebub (2020)
- Book of Lies (2020)
- Asmodevs (2022)
- Rat Kingdom (2024)
- The Judas Paradox (2024)
- The Hanged Man (2024)
