= The Hours That Remain =

Studio album by Mercenary
- Released: 21 August 2006
- Genres: Melodic death metal, power metal
- Length: 62:13
- Label: Century Media Records
- Producer: Jacob Hansen

Mercenary chronology
11 Dreams (2004)	The Hours That Remain (2006)	Architect of Lies (2008)

Professional ratings
Review scores
Source	Rating
AllMusic	3.5/5 stars
Collector's Guide to Heavy Metal	8/10

The Hours That Remain is the fourth studio album by Danish melodic death metal band Mercenary. Released on 21 August 2006, it was the second by the band to be released through Century Media Records and the first to not include founding member Henrik "Kral" Andersen. The album primarily blends melodic death metal with power metal, with almost all the vocals being clean ones. This was due to the absence of a dedicated growling vocalist, which Mercenary has otherwise employed. Growled vocals would return with 2008's Architect of Lies.

== Track listing ==
No.	Title	Length
1.	"Redefine Me"	6:06
2.	"Year of the Plague"	5:29
3.	"My World is Ending"	5:26
4.	"This Eternal Instant"	6:10
5.	"Lost Reality"	8:02
6.	"Soul Decision"	5:03
7.	"Simplicity Demand"	6:35
8.	"Obscure Indiscretion"	4:46
9.	"My Secret Window"	6:29
10.	"The Hours That Remain"	8:07

The import version of the CD contains two additional tracks.

No.	Title	Length
1.	"Into the Sea of Dark Desire/World Hate Center" (Live)	6:27
2.	"11 Dreams" (Live)	6:50

== Limited edition ==
The limited edition of The Hours That Remain includes a DVD. The first song is a video of "Firesoul", songs 2 to 5 are from the live show at Dynamo 2005, and the rest are the official bootleg by the band live at Pratten.

DVD

1. Firesoul (Video Edit Version) – 4:56
2. Intro — reDestructDead (Live Dynamo 2005) – 5:45
3. Firesoul (Live Dynamo 2005) – 8:04
4. Intro — World Hate Center (Live Dynamo 2005) – 6:45
5. 11 Dreams (Live Dynamo 2005) – 8:20
6. Intro — reDestructDead (Live Pratten 2006) – 6:18
7. Firesoul (Live Pratten 2006) – 8:27
8. Sharpen the Edges (Live Pratten 2006) – 5:42
9. Into the Sea — World Hate Center (Live Pratten 2006) – 6:51
10. 11 Dreams (Live Pratten 2006) – 8:18

== Personnel ==
- Mikkel Sandager – vocals
- Jakob Mølbjerg – guitars
- Martin Buus – lead guitars
- Morten Sandager – keys
- Mike Park – drums

Additional musicians

- Jacob Hansen – bass
- Björn "Speed" Strid – vocals on "Redefine Me"
- Marcus Bischoff – vocals on "Soul Decision"

Production

- Jacob Hansen – producer
- Ziggy – mastering
- Travis Smith – art

== Charts ==
Chart performance for The Hours That Remain
Chart (2026)	Peak position
Danish Vinyl Albums (Hitlisten)	9
