= The Toxic Touch =

Studio album by God Dethroned
- Released: October 31, 2006
- Recorded: May–June 2006
- Studio: Soundlodge Studios, Leer, DE
- Genre: Melodic death metal
- Label: Metal Blade
- Producer: God Dethroned, Jörg Uken

God Dethroned chronology
The Lair of the White Worm (2004)	The Toxic Touch (2006)	Passiondale (2009)

Professional ratings
Review scores
Source	Rating
Allmusic	4/5 stars

The Toxic Touch is God Dethroned's seventh studio album.

== Track listing ==
1. "Faithless" (Sattler) – 0:36
2. "Hating Life" (Sattler) – 4:08
3. "2014" (Delahaye, Sattler, VanWeesenbeek) – 4:06
4. "Falling Down" (Delahaye) – 3:36
5. "On Wings of Pestilence" (Delahaye, Sattler) – 5:01
6. "The Day You Died" (Delahaye, Sattler) – 4:04
7. "Away from Emptiness" (Delahaye, Sattler) – 3:05
8. "Macabre World" (Delahaye, Sattler) – 4:04
9. "Typhoid Mary" (Delahaye, Sattler, VanWeesenbeek) – 5:49
10. "Fail to Exist" (Delahaye, Sattler, VanWeesenbeek) – 4:43
