= Waves of Visual Decay =

Studio album by Communic
- Released: 19 May 2006; 27 June 2006 (USA)
- Recorded: Hansen Studios
- Genre: Progressive metal, power metal
- Length: 57:56
- Label: Nuclear Blast
- Producer: Jacob Hansen, Communic

Communic chronology
Conspiracy in Mind (2005)	Waves of Visual Decay (2006)	Payment of Existence (2008)

Professional ratings
Review scores
Source	Rating
Allmusic	4/5 stars
Rock Hard (de)	(9.5/10)

Waves of Visual Decay is the second studio album by the Norwegian progressive/power metal band Communic.

== Track listing ==
All tracks are written by Oddleif Stensland, arranged by Communic

No.	Title	Length
1.	"Under a Luminous Sky"	8:22
2.	"Frozen Asleep in the Park"	8:54
3.	"Watching it All Disappear"	6:55
4.	"Fooled by the Serpent"	9:00
5.	"Waves of Visual Decay"	8:13
6.	"My Bleeding Victim"	6:42
7.	"At Dewy Prime"	9:47

Limited edition
No.	Title	Length
8.	"Conspiracy in Mind" (demo)	7:51
9.	"Ocean Bed" (demo)	6:40

== Personnel ==
Communic

- Oddleif Stensland – lead vocals, lead guitar, rhythm guitar
- Erik Mortensen – bass
- Tor Atle Andersen – drums

Additional musicians

- Endre Kirkesola – keyboards

Production

- Recorded, mixed, and mastered by Jacob Hansen at Hansen Studios, Denmark.

== Technical information ==
Artwork by Anthony Clarkson of The Mind's I.
