= Leading Vision =

Studio album by Gorod
- Released: 22 August 2006
- Recorded: BUD Records Studios
- Genre: Technical death metal
- Length: 41:27
- Label: Willowtip, Candlelight

Gorod chronology
Neurotripsicks (2005)	Leading Vision (2006)	Process of a New Decline (2009)

Leading Vision is the second full-length album by technical death metal band Gorod. It is the last album to feature drummer Sandrine.

Professional ratings
Review scores
Source	Rating
About.com	4/5 stars
Metal Review	7.7/10 stars
Sputnikmusic	4.5/5 stars

== Track listing ==
Recorded & mixed at BUD Records Studios, Mastered at Visceral Sound Studios by Scott Hull

No.	Title	Length
1.	"Here Die Your Gods"	4:35
2.	"Thirst For Power"	3:09
3.	"Blackout"	4:46
4.	"Chronicle from the Stone Age"	3:18
5.	"Life Controller"	4:45
6.	"Edaenia 2312"	5:27
7.	"State of Secret"	4:24
8.	"Eternal Messiah"	3:12
9.	"Obsequium Minaris"	3:53
10.	"Hidden Genocide"	5:20

== Personnel ==
- Guillaume Martinot - vocals
- Arnaud Pontaco - guitar
- Mathieu Pascal - guitar
- Benoit Claus - bass
- Sandrine - drums
