= Mercenary (band) =

Danish melodic death metal band

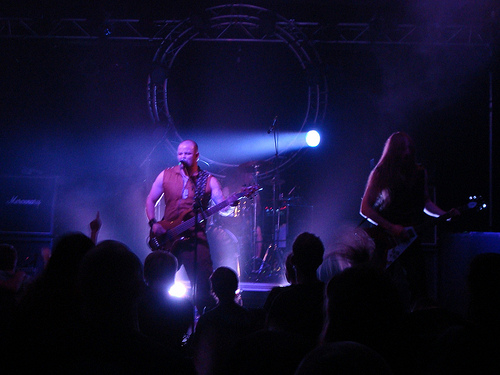
- Mercenary performing in 2010

Background information
- Origin: Aalborg, Denmark
- Genres: Melodic death metal; power metal
- Years active: 1991–present
- Labels: Black Day; Serious; Hammerheart; Century Media
- Members: Jakob Mølbjerg; Martin Buus; René Pedersen; Martin Nielsen
- Past members: Hans Jørgen Andersen; Henrik "Kral" Andersen; Nikolaj Brinkman; Andreas W. Hansen; Jakob Johnsen; Mike Park; Signar Petersen; Mikkel Sandager; Morten Sandager; Morten Løwe; Rasmus Laulund Jacobsen; Peter Mathiesen

Mercenary is a Danish melodic death metal band formed in 1991. The band incorporates power and progressive elements in their songwriting.

== History ==
=== Formation and first releases (1991–2003) ===
Henrik "Kral" Andersen formed Mercenary in Aalborg, Denmark, in 1991. The band name was taken from a lyric in the Slayer song, "Ghosts of War". After releasing two demos, Domicile (1993) and Gummizild (1994), they signed with Black Day Records, and released a four-song EP, Supremacy (1996). In 1997, they signed to Danish label Serious Entertainment, and in 1998 they released their full-length debut, First Breath.

In 2002, the band expanded their sound with pianist Morten Sandager and his brother Mikkel, who contributed vocals. This new line-up added a new dimension to their sound, blending melody and aggression.

That year, Mercenary played at the ProgPower music festival in the United States and released their second album, Everblack. The band fired drummer Rasmus Jacobsen because he was not devoted to the group. Guitarist Signar Petersen left the band for personal reasons. Drummer Mike Park Nielson and guitarist Martin Buus Pedersen filled the vacant spots. This lineup signed to Century Media Records.

=== Continued success and the departure of Henrik Andersen (2004–2006) ===
In 2004, Mercenary released their third full-length album, 11 Dreams. This was their most commercially successful album, gaining international attention from fans and critics. That year, Mercenary toured as a supporting act for Evergrey, and later with Brainstorm, who were on their first headlining European tour. They played on the 16th Wacken Open Air in 2005, and supported Nevermore on a European tour later that year.

At the end of March 2006, the band announced that Andersen left the band. Mikkel Sandager said in an interview that Andersen's departure was due to "being away from his family and...trying to make it with the band for 15 years. I think that he simply got tired of trying and trying."

The band wrote and recorded their fourth full-length as a five-piece, with Sandager on vocals and the album's producer, Jacob Hansen, on bass. On 7 April 2006, the band finished the recording at Jacob Hansens Studios. Shortly after this, the band hired bassist/vocalist René Pedersen to replace Andersen.

On 19 and 20 May 2006, at Saegfestival (held in Greding, Germany), Mercenary first performed live with Pedersen. They played "Soul Decision", a song from their upcoming fourth album. On 1 August 2006, Mercenary released a compilation of their early demos, Retrospective, and on 22 August, the album The Hours That Remain, was released.

In September 2006, Mercenary joined numerous bands such as Evergrey, Epica, and Jørn Lande in the ProgPower USA festival. They covered Pantera's "Cowboys from Hell" at the request of the show's promoter.

=== The Hours That Remain and lineup changes (2007–2009) ===
On 21 October 2007, they announced they were recording a follow-up album to The Hours That Remain. On 12 December 2007, the band announced on their Myspace page that the new album was complete. Eight days later, the band announced the title of the album was Architect of Lies. It was released on 25 March 2008.

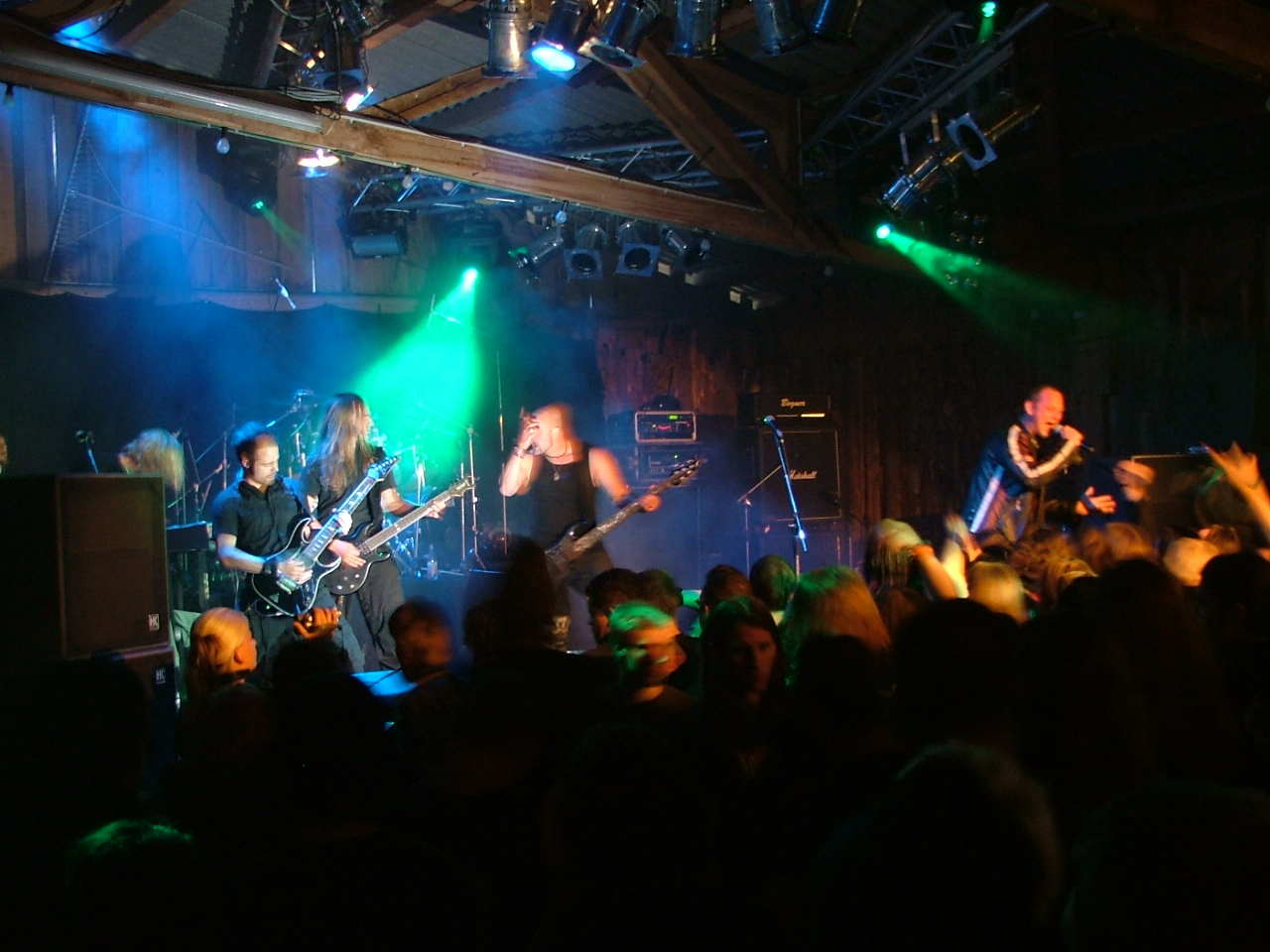
Mercenary in 2007

On 11 November 2009, it was announced that Mikkel, Morten, and Mike had left the band. According to Jakob in a press statement, "We no longer share the same vision and enthusiasm about the direction and the future of the band".

=== New lineup, Metamorphosis and Through Our Darkest Days (2009–2013) ===
On 23 November 2009, the band announced a new lineup via Facebook.

On 23 December 2010, the band released a song from their then-upcoming album, Metamorphosis. They released Metamorphosis in 2011.

On 26 July 2013, the band released Through Our Darkest Days.

=== Hiatus, new band member and Soundtrack for the End of Times (2013–present) ===
On 15 January 2020, Mercenary announced the addition of drummer Martin Nielsen, replacing Peter Mathiesen.

On 9 March 2020, the band teased a new release after almost seven years. The single "From the Ashes of the Fallen" was released on 10 April 2020, followed by "Where Darkened Souls Belong" on 25 February 2022.

Following these releases, the band announced they were working on their eighth album, Soundtrack For The End Of Times, supported by a crowdfunding campaign. Jacob Hansen produced the album. A new single from Soundtrack For The End Of Times, "Heart Of The Numb", including vocals from Trivium singer Matt Heafy, was released on 14 July 2023, followed by the release of the full album on 22 September 2023.

== Band members ==
Current

- Jakob Mølbjerg – rhythm guitar (1994–present)
- Martin Buus – lead guitar (2002–present), keyboards, backing vocals (2009–present)
- René Pedersen – bass, unclean vocals (2006–present), clean vocals (2009–present)
- Martin Nielsen – drums (2019–present)

Former

- Henrik "Kral" Andersen – bass (1994–2006), unclean vocals (1991–2006), lead guitar (1991–1993)
- Hans Jørgen Andersen – rhythm guitar (1991–1994; died 2012)
- Andreas W. Hansen – bass (1991–1994)
- Jakob Johnsen – drums (1991–1993)
- Rasmus Jacobsen – drums (1993–2002)
- Nikolaj Brinkman – lead guitar (1994–2000; died 2002)
- Signar Petersen – lead guitar (2000–2002)
- Mike Park Nielsen – drums (2002–2009)
- Morten Sandager – keyboards (2002–2009)
- Mikkel Sandager – clean vocals (2002–2009)
- Morten Løwe – drums (2009–2011)
- Peter Mathiesen – drums (2011–2020)

Timeline

== Discography ==
=== Studio albums ===
- First Breath (1998)
- Everblack (2002)
- 11 Dreams (2004)
- The Hours That Remain (2006)
- Architect of Lies (2008)
- Metamorphosis (2011)
- Through Our Darkest Days (2013)
- Soundtrack for the End Times (2023)

=== EPs ===
- Supremacy (1996)

=== Compilations ===
- Mercenary (2006)

=== Demos ===
- Domicile (1993)
- Gummizild (1994)

=== Music videos ===
- "Firesoul" (from 11 Dreams)
- "My World Is Ending" (from The Hours That Remain)
- "Isolation" (from Architect of Lies)
- "The Endless Fall" (from Architect of Lies)
- "Through the Eyes of the Devil" (from Metamorphosis)
