= 11 Dreams =

Studio album by Mercenary
- Released: 23 August 2004
- Recorded: Lund and Hansen Studios, Denmark
- Genres: Melodic death metal; power metal
- Length: 61:51
- Label: Century Media Records
- Producer: Jacob Hansen

Mercenary chronology
Everblack (2002)	11 Dreams (2004)	The Hours That Remain (2006)

11 Dreams is the third studio album by Danish melodic death metal band Mercenary, released through Century Media Records in Europe in 2004, and in the United States in 2005. The U.S. release contained two bonus tracks, one being a 3D version of the song "11 Dreams", and another a radio edit of the song. This is the first album with Mike Park on drums and Martin Buus on lead guitars. This is also the final album to feature founding member Henrik "Kral" Andersen on bass guitar and death growls.

== Reception ==
Professional ratings
Review scores
Source	Rating
AllMusic	4/5 stars
Collector's Guide to Heavy Metal	10/10

"Denmark's Mercenary are following bands like In Flames and Soilwork in terms of adding more symphonic and melodic elements to their brand of extreme metal with their latest release 11 Dreams. A greater emphasis is placed on catchy vocal hooks, where the clean vocal passages from Mikkel Sandager trade off with the more aggressive death/black metal stylings from bass player Henrik 'Kral' Andersen."

"Highly progressive, Mercenary are influenced by bands like Soilwork, In Flames, Nevermore, Sentenced, and pretty much anything Scandinavian and influential, as well as occasionally throwing in a bit of thrash."

== Track listing ==
All tracks are written by Mercenary.

No.	Title	Length
1.	"Into the Sea of Dark Desires"	1:05
2.	"World Hate Center"	4:58
3.	"11 Dreams"	6:51
4.	"reDestructDead"	5:45
5.	"Firesoul"	7:36
6.	"Sharpen the Edges"	5:32
7.	"Supremacy v2.0"	8:09
8.	"Music Non Stop" (Kent cover)	4:11
9.	"Falling"	6:56
10.	"Times Without Changes"	2:58
11.	"Loneliness"	7:36

== Personnel ==
- Jakob Mølbjerg – rhythm guitar
- Mikkel Sandager – clean vocals
- Henrik "Kral" Andersen – death growls, bass
- Morten Sandager – keyboards
- Mike Park – drums
- Martin Buus – lead guitar

Guest appearances

- Monika Pedersen – additional vocals on "Firesoul" and "Falling"
- Jacob Hansen – backing vocals on "Sharpen the Edges"
- Ziggy – backing vocals on "Sharpen the Edges"

Production

- Art by Niklas Sundin
