= Neurotic Records =

Dutch record label

Neurotic Records is an independent extreme metal record label based in Tilburg, the Netherlands.

== History ==
Neurotic Records was founded in late 2003 by Ruud Lemmen, who was initially responsible for European distribution for the American label Unique Leader, before deciding to set up his own label.

Between 2004 and 2015, the company organized the annual death metal festival Neurotic Deathfest.

In mid-2007, the label signed a licensing deal with American label Willowtip to distribute previously unavailable Neurotic Records releases and merchandise in North America.

== Partial list of bands ==
=== Current ===
- Arsebreed
- Corpus Mortale
- Disavowed
- Flesh Made Sin
- Kronos
- The New Dominion
- Prostitute Disfigurement
- Ruins
- Visceral Bleeding

=== Former ===
- Fleshgod Apocalypse
- Panzerchrist
- Psycroptic
- Sauron
- Sickening Horror
- Spawn of Possession
- Ulcerate

== Partial list of releases ==
- Corpus Mortale – With Lewd Demeanor (2003)
- Visceral Bleeding – Transcend Into Ferocity (2004)
- Sauron – For a Dead Race (2004)
- Visceral Bleeding – Remnants Revived (2005)
- Prostitute Disfigurement – Left in Grisly Fashion (2005)
- Ruins – Spun Forth as Dark Nets (2005)
- Arsebreed – Munching the Rotten (2005)
- Psycroptic – Symbols of Failure (2006)
- Spawn of Possession – Noctambulant (2006)
- Panzerchrist – Battalion Beast (2006)
- Ulcerate – Of Fracture and Failure (2006)
- Visceral Bleeding – Absorbing the Disarray (2007)
- Disavowed – Stagnated Existence (2007)
- Sickening Horror – When Landscapes Bled Backwards (2007)
- Corpus Mortale – A New Species of Deviant (2007)
- Prostitute Disfigurement – Descendants of Depravity (2008)
