= Skinless =

American death metal band

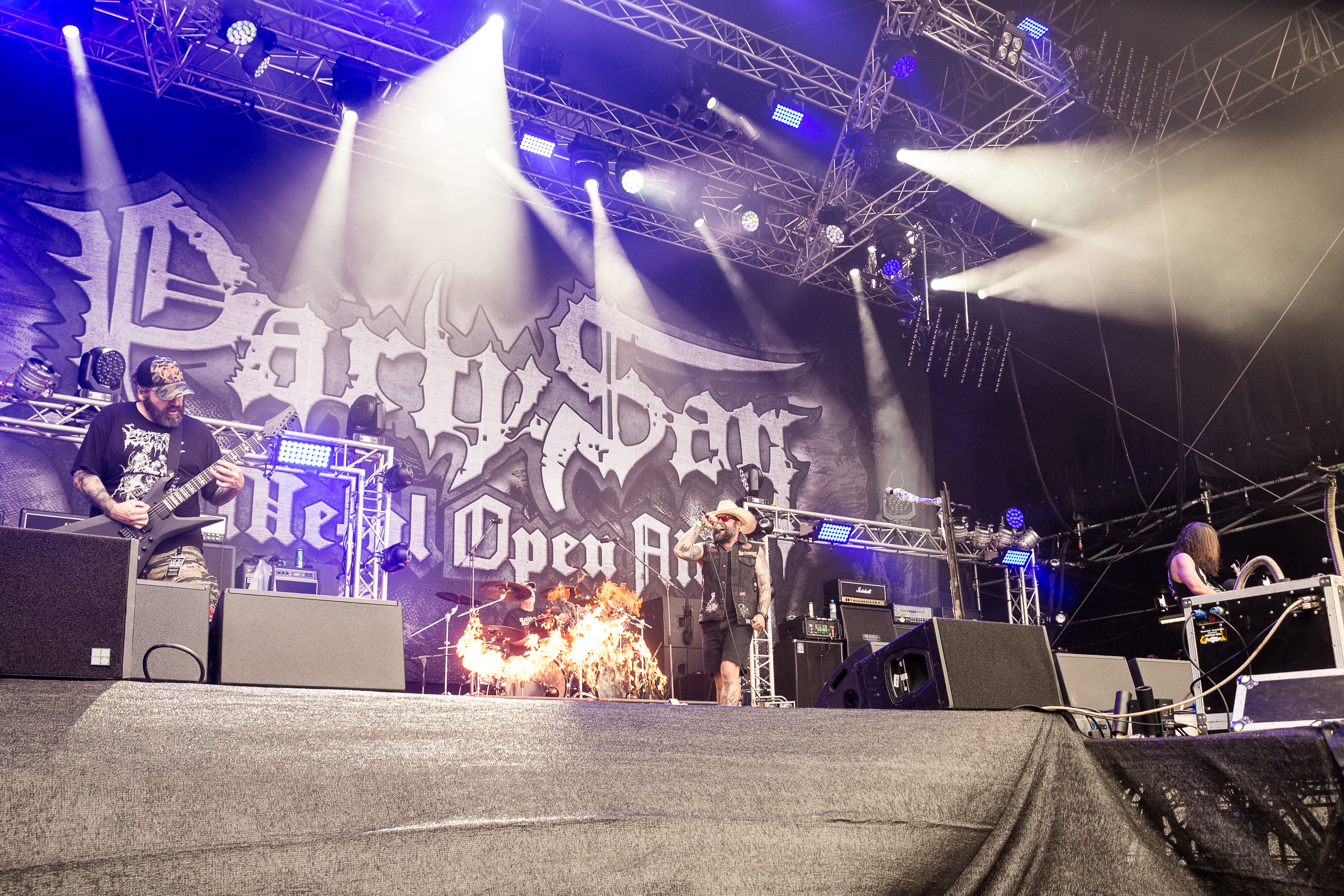
- Skinless at the Party.San Festival 2023

Background information
- Origin: South Glens Falls, New York, U.S.
- Genre: Brutal death metal
- Years active: 1992–2011; 2013–present
- Label: Relapse
- Members: Noah Carpenter; Sherwood Webber; Bob Beaulac; Joe Keyser; Dave Matthews
- Past members: Dan Bell; Ted Monsour; Ryan Wade; Jeff Vanloan; Mike Levy; Martin Oprencak; Adam Lewis; Joe Clark; George Torres; John Longstreth; Jason Keyser; Chris Mahar
- Website: Skinless on Facebook

Skinless is an American death metal band from Glens Falls, New York. The band formed in 1992, disbanded in 2011, and reformed in 2013.

== History ==
Ryan Wade and Noah Carpenter formed Skinless in South Glens Falls, New York. After relocating to various New York towns and cities such as Saratoga Springs, Clifton Park, and Cohoes, the band settled in Troy, New York.

Skinless is known for its intense performances and lyrical mix of end-of-the-world cynicism and comedy, which at times satirizes well known death metal lyrics from bands such as Carcass and Cannibal Corpse, and death metal in general. These themes are evident in songs such as "The Optimist", about a crumbling human society, and "Tug of War Intestines", which depicts children playing schoolyard games with a surgery patient's internal organs. The band has occasionally brought the "Skinless Girl" on stage and let her be roughed up, covered in fake blood, while the band performed. Earlier in the band's career, Skinless handed out long tubes of foam for the audience to beat each other. These tubes were nicknamed "The Logs of Brutality".

Skinless's 1998 debut album, Progression Towards Evil, was an independent release that garnered praise from fans and critics. In June 2010, Skinless played a reunion show with the line-up from the first two full-length albums. Guitarist Noah Carpenter wanted Skinless to continue but the band's "fire" was not there anymore. In April 2011, Skinless officially split up, but soon after announced a farewell performance at Maryland Deathfest 2011. All the members continue in other bands.

Skinless reformed in 2013 with the original line up from Progression Towards Evil. The band added second guitarist Dave Matthews.

Skinless released the album Only the Ruthless Remain on June 2, 2015, their first since Trample the Weak, Hurdle the Dead in 2006. On May 11, 2018, the band released their sixth studio album, Savagery.

== Members ==
Current members

- Noah Carpenter – guitars (1992–present)
- Joe Keyser – bass (1997–present)
- Bob Beaulac – drums (1997–2001, 2004–2005, 2009–present)
- Sherwood Webber IV – vocals (1994–2004, 2010–present)
- Dave Matthews – guitars (2013–present)

Former members

- Dan Bell – vocals (1992)
- Ted Monsour – bass, vocals (1992–1994)
- Ryan Wade – drums, vocals (1992–1996)
- Jeff Vanloan – bass (1993)
- Mike Levy – vocals (1993–1994)
- Martin Oprencak – vocals (1994)
- Adam Lewis – bass (1995–1997)
- Joe Clark – drums (1996)
- George Torres – drums (2002)
- John Longstreth – drums (2003)
- Jason Keyser – vocals (2005–2009)
- Chris Mahar – drums (2006–2009)

Timeline

== Discography ==
=== Albums ===
- Progression Towards Evil (1998)
- Foreshadowing Our Demise (2001)
- From Sacrifice to Survival (2003)
- Trample the Weak, Hurdle the Dead (2006)
- Only the Ruthless Remain (2015)
- Savagery (2018)

=== Other releases ===
- Demo (demo, 1994)
- Swollen Heaps (demo, 1995)
- Frozen Dawn (compilation, 1996)
- Common Ground: A Compilation of Upstate NY's Hardest (split, 1997)
- Maledictive Pigs / Skinless (split, 2001)
- Miscreant (EP, 2002)
- Skinflick (DVD, 2004)
- Regression Towards Evil: 1994–1998 ("best of" compilation, 2007)
