= Entombed discography =

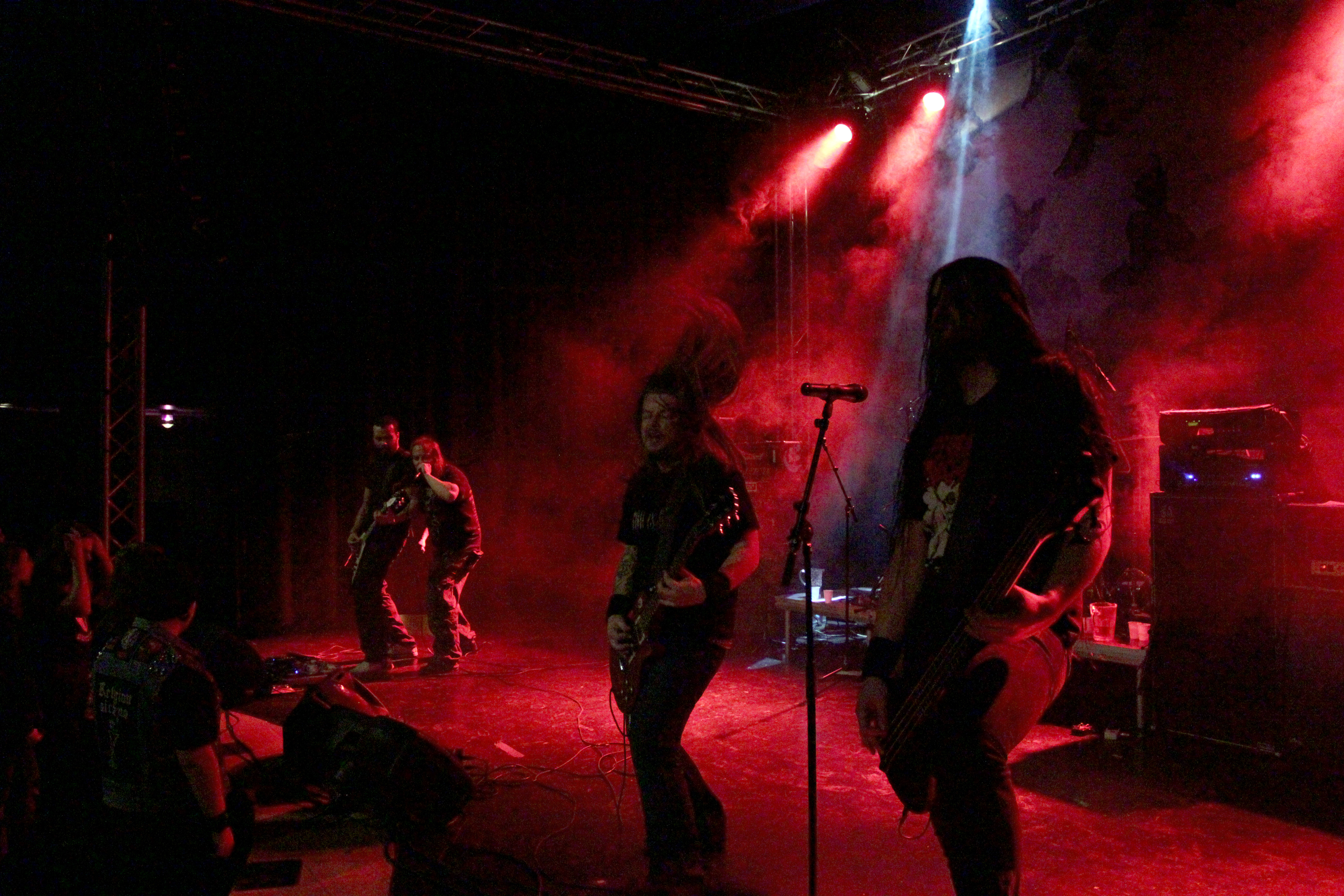
- Entombed in 2011
- Studio albums: 9
- EPs: 6
- Live albums: 2
- Compilation albums: 2
- Video albums: 1
- Music videos: 9
- Demos: 1

This is a comprehensive discography of Entombed, a Swedish death metal band.

== Studio albums ==
Title	Album details	Peak chart positions					Sales
Title	Album details	SWE	NLD	UK	FIN	US Heat	Sales
Left Hand Path	Released: 4 June 1990; Label: Earache Records; Formats: CD, CS, LP, digital download	44	78	—	—	—	
Clandestine	Released: 12 November 1991; Label: Earache Records; Formats: CD, CS, LP, digital download	14	—	—	52	—	US: 35,000+
Wolverine Blues	Released: 31 August 1993; Label: Earache Records; Formats: CD, CS, LP, digital download	2	89	—	43	11	US: 56,000+
DCLXVI: To Ride, Shoot Straight and Speak the Truth	Released: 28 October 1997; Label: Music for Nations; Formats: CD, CS, LP	6	—	75	16	—	US: 12,000+
Same Difference	Released: 16 November 1998; Label: Music for Nations; Formats: CD, LP	52	—	—	—	—	US: 6,000+
Uprising	Released: 6 March 2000; Label: Music for Nations; Formats: CD, LP	55	—	—	—	—	US: 3,000+
Morning Star	Released: 3 September 2001; Label: Music for Nations; Formats: CD, LP	41	—	—	—	—	US: 2,000+
Inferno	Released: 4 August 2003; Label: Music for Nations; Formats: CD, LP	21	—	—	—	—	
Serpent Saints: The Ten Amendments	Released: 25 June 2007; Label: Threeman Recordings; Formats: CD, LP	3	—	—	—	—	US: 400+
"—" denotes a recording that did not chart or was not released in that territory.

== Extended plays ==
Title	Album details	Peak chart positions
Title	Album details	SWE
Crawl	Released: 1991; Label: Earache Records; Formats: CD, CS, LP	—
Stranger Aeons	Released: June 1992; Label: Earache Records; Formats: CD, CS, LP	—
Hollowman	Released: 1993; Label: Earache Records; Formats: CD, CS, LP, digital download	26
Wreckage	Released: 6 October 1997; Label: Music for Nations; Formats: CD, CS	—
Black Juju	Released: 8 November 1999; Label: Man's Ruin Records; Formats: CD, LP	—
When in Sodom	Released: 6 June 2006; Label: Threeman Recordings; Formats: CD	—
"—" denotes a recording that did not chart or was not released in that territory.

== Split albums ==
List of split albums
Title	Album details	Notes	Tracklisting
King Kong 4	Released: 19 May 1993; Label: King Kong; Formats: LP	split with Doll Squad and Teddy Bears	1. Entombed – State of Emergency (Stiff Little Fingers cover); 2. Doll Squad – In League with Satan (Venom cover); 3. Teddybears – Cherrybomb (The Runaways cover)
Night of the Vampire / I Hate People	Released: 1995; Label: Earache Records; Formats: LP	split with The New Bomb Turks	1. Entombed – Night of the Vampire (Roky Erickson cover); 2. The New Bomb Turks – I Hate People (Anti-Nowhere League cover)
Candlemass vs. Entombed	Released: 8 January 2013; Label: Sweden Rock; Formats: CD	split with Candlemass	1. Candlemass – To Ride, Shoot Straight and Speak the Truth (Entombed cover); 2. Entombed – Black Dwarf (Candlemass cover)
Drowned	Released: 20 April 2013; Label: Earache Records; Formats: LP	split with Evile	1. Entombed – Drowned; 2. Evile – Drowned (Entombed cover)

== Live albums ==
List of live albums
Title	Album details
Monkey Puss (Live in London)	Released: 17 November 1999; Label: Earache Records; Formats: CD, digital download
Unreal Estate	Released: 22 February 2005; Label: Threeman Recordings; Formats: CD
Clandestine Live	Released: September 2017; Label: Threeman Recordings; Formats: CD, LP

== Compilations ==
List of compilation albums
Title	Album details
Entombed	Released: 25 April 1997; Label: Earache Records; Formats: CD
Sons of Satan Praise the Lord	Released: 11 November 2002; Label: Music for Nations; Formats: CD

== Demos ==
List of demos
Title	Album details
But Life Goes On	Released: 1989; Label: CBR Records; Formats: CS

== Video albums ==
List of video albums
Title	Album details
Monkey Puss (Live in London)	Released: 17 November 1999; Label: Earache Records; Formats: VHS
Clandestine Live	Released: September 2017; Label: Threeman Recordings; Formats: DVD

== Other appearances ==
Year	Title	Album	Ref.
1989	"But Life Goes On"	Grindcrusher	

== Music videos ==
Year	Title	Directed	Album
1990	"Left Hand Path"	Kim Hansen	Left Hand Path
1991	"Stranger Aeons"	Barry Maguire	Clandestine
1993	"Wolverine Blues"	Frank Drucker	Wolverine Blues
1993	"Hollowman"	Entombed	Hollowman
1997	"Night of the Vampire"	Entombed	Entombed
1997	"Damn Deal Done"	—	To Ride, Shoot Straight and Speak the Truth
1997	"Wreckage"	—	To Ride, Shoot Straight and Speak the Truth
1998	"Addiction King"	Alex Hellid, Yasin Hillborg	Same Difference
1998	"What You Need"	—	Same Difference
2000	"Say It in Slugs"	—	Uprising
2000	"Seeing Red"	Lloyd Kaufman	Uprising
2001	"I for an Eye"	—	Morning Star
2002	"Albino Flogged in Black"	—	Inferno
2003	"Retaliation"	Entombed	Inferno
2007	"Amok"	—	Serpent Saints: The Ten Amendments
