= Monkey Puss (Live in London) =

Live album by Entombed
- Released: Early 1999
- Recorded: 18 March 1992, London Astoria
- Genre: Death metal
- Length: 46:48
- Label: Earache

Entombed chronology
Same Difference (1998)	Monkey Puss (Live in London) (1999)	Uprising (2000)

Professional ratings
Review scores
Source	Rating
AllMusic	3/5 stars
Collector's Guide to Heavy Metal	6/10

Monkey Puss (Live in London) is a live album by Swedish band Entombed recorded during the 1992 Gods of Grind tour in London. It was released in 1999 on Earache Records.

Also a video version is available, which is the only official live video of early Entombed. Originally it was released on VHS cassette, it was later re-released in 2001 on DVD. The VHS and DVD version contain five additional non-live videos (Left Hand Path, Stranger Aeons, Hollowman, Wolverine Blues and Night of the Vampire).

Monkey Puss can be seen during video as being written with feltpen on Nicke Andersson's snare drum, as well as on one of the band member's guitars, hence the album name.

== Track listing ==
No.	Title	Length
1.	"Living Dead"	6:03
2.	"Revel in Flesh"	3:43
3.	"Stranger Aeons"	3:58
4.	"Crawl"	5:31
5.	"But Life Goes On"	2:52
6.	"Sinners Bleed"	4:42
7.	"Evilyn"	4:58
8.	"The Truth Beyond"	3:36
9.	"Drowned"	3:56
10.	"Left Hand Path"	7:32
Total length:		46:48
