= Mefisto (band) =

Swedish extreme metal band

- Origin: Stockholm, Sweden
- Genres: Extreme metal
- Years active: 1984–1987, 2014–present
- Members: Omar Ahmed; Robert "Thord" Granath; Morgan Myhrberg
- Past members: Sandro Cajander

Mefisto is a Swedish extreme metal band formed in Stockholm in 1984.

== History ==
After changing its name from Torment, Mefisto was one of the first Swedish extreme bands to follow Bathory. They had a big influence on early Swedish death metal, along with Obscurity as well as Merciless shortly thereafter.

Mefisto originally consisted of three members: guitarist Omar Ahmed, drummer Robert "Thord" Granath, and singer Sandro Cajander. Cajander, who later joined Morbid, had a deep, harsh vocal style comparable to but more extreme than peers Bathory or Venom, which was developed further by LG Petrov of Nihilist (later Entombed).

Mefisto released two cassette demos, "Megalomania" in May 1986 and "The Puzzle" in November 1986. However, after just two demos Mefisto disbanded in 1987, getting little support. The band has since gained cult status, heavily influencing the upcoming extreme music underground, especially the Stockholm death metal scene. These demos, which were reissued as a compilation CD entitled "The Truth" on Regain Records in 1999 form a prototype for Swedish death metal. As of December 2014, they have reformed. Their debut album was released on 20 February 2016.

== Band members ==
- Omar Ahmed – guitar (1984–1987, 2014-present); vocals (2014–present)
- Robert "Thord" Granath – drums (1984–1987; 2014–present)
- Morgan Myhrberg – bass (2014–present)
- Sandro Cajander – vocals (1984–1987)

== Discography ==
- Megalomania (demo, 1986)
- The Puzzle (demo, 1986)
- 2.0.1.6: This Is the End of It All... The Beginning of Everything... (studio album, 2016)
- Mefisto (studio album, 2017)
