= Deathpunk =

Deathpunk may refer to:

- Deathrock, a rock music genre which emerged from punk rock
- Grindcore, a genre fusing hardcore punk with thrash metal and death metal
- Deathcore, a genre fusing death metal with metalcore and/or hardcore punk
- The self-described style of Norwegian punk rock band Turbonegro
  - Love It to Deathpunk, a compilation album released by Turbonegro in Australia

== See also ==
- Death metal, death and roll
