= Boss HM-2 =

Distortion pedal

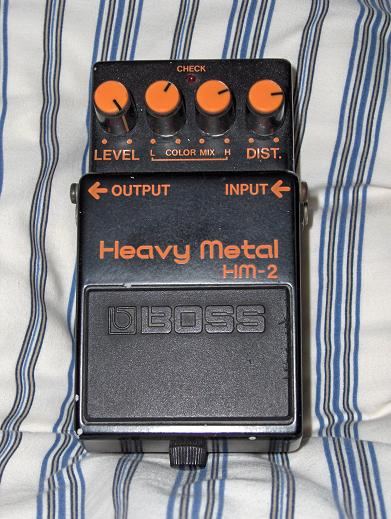
- Brand: Boss
- Manufacturer: Roland Corporation
- Dates: 1983—1991 (Original); 2020—present (Waza Craft)
- Price: $90 (Original launch)

Technical specifications
- Effects type: Distortion pedal

Controls
- Pedal control: Distortion (Dist), highs (H), lows (L), output volume (level), standard and custom mode (Waza Craft)

Input/output
- Inputs: mono
- Outputs: mono

Metal song created with the Boss HM-2.

The Boss HM-2 Heavy Metal is a distortion pedal manufactured by Boss from October 1983 until October 1991. Designed to emulate a Marshall stack, it became associated with Swedish death metal and gained a cult following in the heavy metal scene.

== Background ==
The Boss HM-2 was first issued in October 1983. It was originally manufactured in Japan from 1983 until 1988 and then in Taiwan from 1988 until 1991. It was designed to emulate the mid-range response of a Marshall stack. The HM-2 is based on Boss's DS-1. Despite achieving moderate success in the glam metal scene, the pedal was discontinued in 1991; it was succeeded by the HM-3 Hyper Metal and MT-2 Metal Zone, the latter of which became a commercial success and top-selling Boss pedal.

Since its discontinuance, the HM-2 has become one of the most demanded pedals of the Boss back catalogue. Guitarist and record producer Kurt Ballou has been cited as an influence for the pedal's resurgence and bands such as Nails and Rotten Sound have also appropriated the pedal's sound for different extreme metal styles.

In 2020, Boss Corporation president Yoshi Ikegami announced that the pedal would be reissued as a part of the Waza Craft pedal series under the name Boss HM-2W. For the reissue, the company also established a Facebook group to seek design feedback from the fanbase. The prototype of the HM-2W was tested by Ola Englund. The Waza Craft version added standard and custom mode to the Boss HM-2W.

== Swedish death metal ==
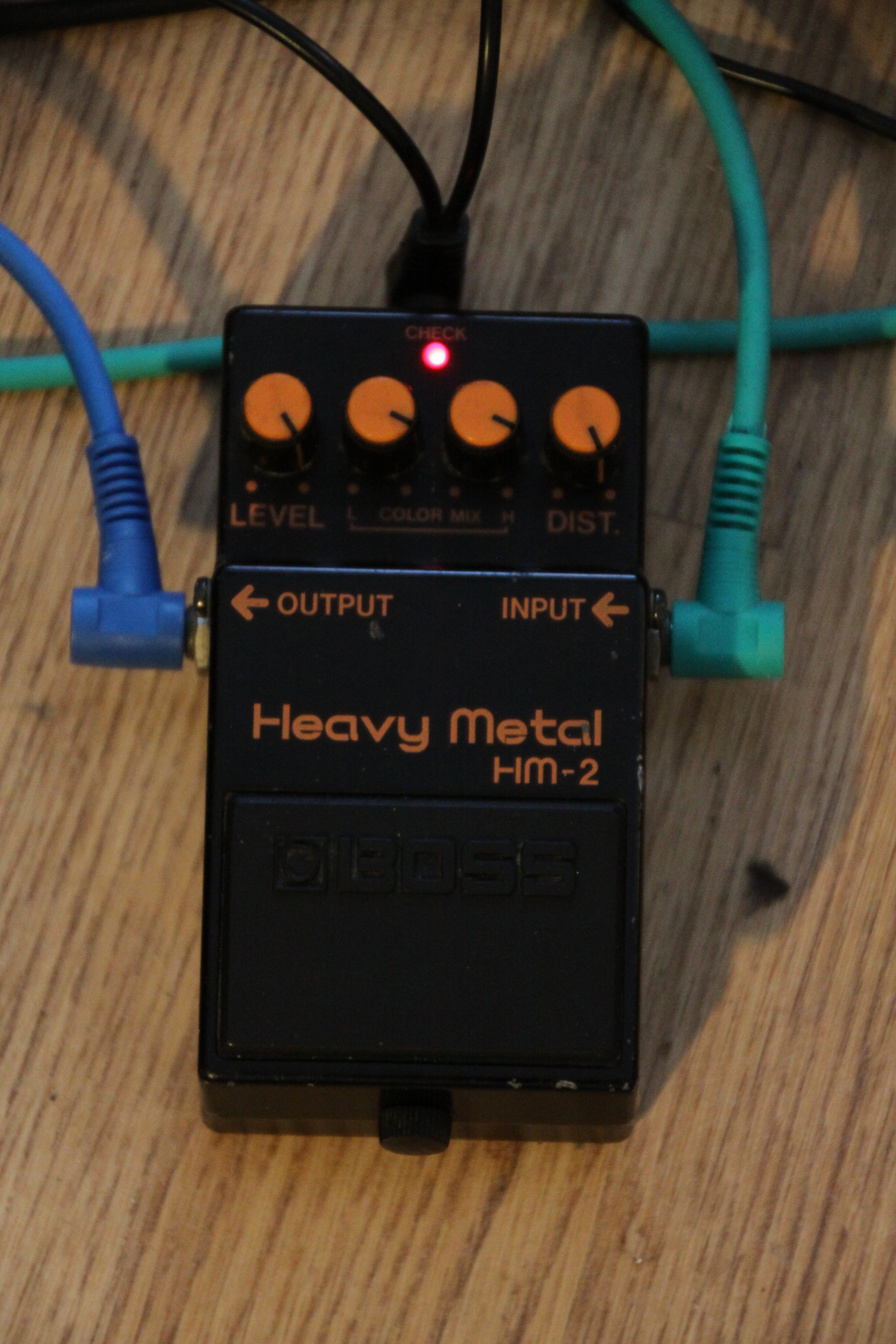
Boss HM-2 with maximum settings (colloquially referred to as being "dimed"). These settings became well known in the Swedish death metal scene to achieve the "Chainsaw" tone.

Leif Cuzner of Swedish death metal band Nihilist used the pedal with the controls "dimed," and bands like Entombed, Dismember, and Bloodbath followed suit. Many Swedish bands have used the HM-2 with a Peavey amp to achieve this sound. In the 1990s, the pedal attracted a cult following in the underground heavy metal scene due to its formative influence over the Swedish death metal sound. Entombed's 1990 album, Left Hand Path, cemented its use in the scene.

Anders Nyström of Bloodbath said, "The Boss HM-2 is the holy grail of death metal. There is no other pedal that has meant as much to this genre. It has been described as a chainsaw or a buzzsaw, and I think that’s a good comparison; it is a chainsaw formed into a guitar sound. How can you go further? How can you go beyond that? You can’t. It is the most essential sound in death metal of all time, and the bands who have adopted that were always going to be unbeatable in a sense. Other bands had outstanding performers and musicians, and kick-ass songs, but if they didn’t have that sound they were still sub-par in some way, and this pedal has meant everything."

== Controls ==
According to Michael Astley-Brown of Guitar World, compared to the other distortion pedals, the pedal offered "radically versatile low and high ‘Color Mix’ EQ controls with 20 dB of boost/cut."

== Notable users ==
- Mika Aalto
- Erhan Alman
- Michael Amott
- Anders Björler
- David Blomqvist
- Justin Broadrick
- Uffe Cederlund
- The Chemical Brothers (with a Juno-106)
- Leif “Leffe” Cuzner
- Nico Elgstrand
- Niclas Engelin
- Ola Englund
- Per Eriksson
- Euronymous
- David Gilmour
- Debbie Gough
- G. C. Green
- Alex Hellid
- Christofer Johnsson
- Todd Jones
- Martin Larsson
- Glenn Ljungström
- Rabea Massaad
- Guilherme Miranda
- Anders Nyström
- David Parland
- Niklas Sandin
- Mike Schleibaum
- Robert Sennebäck
- Tomas Skogsberg
- Jesper Strömblad
- Dan Swanö
- Kristian Wåhlin
- Justin York

== See also ==
- Boss MT-2
- List of distortion pedals
