= Uprising (Entombed album) =

Studio album by Entombed
- Released: 6 March 2000
- Recorded: 1999
- Genre: Death 'n' roll
- Length: 43:51
- Label: Music for Nations
- Producer: Nico Elgstrand and Entombed

Entombed chronology
Same Difference (1998)	Uprising (2000)	Morning Star (2001)

Professional ratings
Review scores
Source	Rating
AllMusic	3.5/5 stars
Collector's Guide to Heavy Metal	10/10
Kerrang!	4/5 stars

Uprising is the sixth full-length album by Swedish metal band Entombed. It was released in 2000. Album was recorded at Das Boot Studios and produced by Nico Elgstrand and Entombed. Musically, this album abandons the commercial alternative metal-stylings of Same Difference and returns to a heavier, more straight-forward death 'n' roll sound reminiscent of Wolverine Blues.

== Track listing ==
All tracks are written by Uffe Cederlund, except where noted.

No.	Title	Writer(s)	Length
1.	"Seeing Red"		3:29
2.	"Say It in Slugs"		4:46
3.	"Won't Back Down"	Jörgen Sandström	3:12
4.	"Insanity's Contagious"		2:51
5.	"Something Out of Nothing"	Sandström	3:13
6.	"Scottish Hell" (Dead Horse cover)	Greg Martin	3:08
7.	"Time Out"		4:00
8.	"The Itch"	Sandström	4:22
9.	"Year In Year Out"		2:39
10.	"Returning to Madness"		3:15
11.	"Come Clean"		2:52
12.	"In the Flesh"	Cederlund, Sandström, Peter Stjärnvind	6:04
Total length:			43:51

US edition bonus tracks, recorded June 2000
No.	Title	Length
13.	"Superior"	3:44
14.	"The Only Ones"	2:41
15.	"Words" (Cederlund, Sandström)	3:18
Total length:		53:51

== Personnel ==
- Lars-Göran Petrov – vocals
- Uffe Cederlund – guitar, backing vocals, organ
- Alex Hellid – guitar
- Jörgen Sandström – bass
- Peter Stjärnvind – drums

Guests musicians

- Jonas Lundberg – maracas on "Insanity's Contagious", tambourine on "Time Out"
- Fred Estby – drums on "Year In Year Out" and "Returning to Madness"
