= Cremation (band) =

Swiss death metal band

Cremation is a Swiss death metal band.

The band hails from Valais.

== Reception ==
Having been active for many years, Cremation saw 2012's Rise of the Phoenix was discovered by metal media. Ten years had passed since their previous album Grotesque Humanity, and Cremation had firmly been connected to the underground until then. Metal.de wondered if they would be more well-known if they were from Sweden. Their sound did not conform to Swedish death metal, though, rather American bands such as Suffocation and Immolation. Rise of the Phoenix required time to digest, owing to Cremation's "Numerous breaks, technical ups and downs, and the largely monotonous muttering of singer Spiga". The album contained "a wealth of detail". The reviewer gave the grade 7 out of 10 and concluded: "The tightrope walk between technical skill and hefty, headbanging power works brilliantly in principle, although it's not always immediately obvious and sometimes requires a bit of digging to discover". Vampster added that "an American death metal connoisseur will be convinced of the Swiss band's talent", adding Incantation and Grave among the musical references. Cremation were not "reinventing the wheel", but sported "skill, aggression, and a killer groove".

Where the Blood Flows Down the Mountains from 2022, released by Czar Of Crickets Productions, was noticed abroad as well. Rock Hard bestowed 8 out of 10 points upon this album. Norway's Scream Magazine gave a similar rating, 5 out of 6, as Cremation played "brilliant old school death metal", delivering a good kick with "raw riffs and senseless drive". Ox-Fanzine called it "a well-balanced death metal slab that, thanks to outstanding tracks like "Plaguelord," will certainly earn a prominent place on my CD shelf". Metal.de repeated their 7 out of 10 score from before. Despite lengthy song passing the 5 minute mark, the album was never boring, but rather a mix of "full-throttle fury" and "numerous headbanging and moshing-inducing sections". The band also showcased "impressive guitar virtuosity".

== Discography ==
- Ignis (1999)
- Grotesque Humanity (2002)
- Rise of the Phoenix (2012)
- In the Maelstrom of Time (2017)
- Where the Blood Flows Down the Mountains (2022)
