= Inferno (Entombed album) =

Studio album by Entombed
- Released: 4 August 2003
- Studio: Atlantis, Gröndahl and Toytown Studios
- Genre: Death metal; death 'n' roll; thrash metal
- Length: 45:53
- Label: Music for Nations
- Producer: Pelle "Wigwam" Gunnerfeldt

Entombed chronology
Sons of Satan Praise the Lord (2002)	Inferno (2003)	Unreal Estate (2005)

Professional ratings
Review scores
Source	Rating
AllMusic	3.5/5 stars

Inferno is the eighth studio album by Swedish death metal band Entombed. It was released on 4 August 2003. The album is a continuation of the sound heard on 2001's Morning Star, and combines traditional death metal with death 'n' roll, along with various other elements and influences.

== Track listing ==
No.	Title	Length
1.	"Retaliation"	3:55
2.	"The Fix Is In"	3:15
3.	"Incinerator"	3:00
4.	"Children of the Underworld"	4:04
5.	"That's When I Became a Satanist"	3:02
6.	"Nobodaddy"	3:01
7.	"Intermission"	2:10
8.	"Young & Dead"	3:05
9.	"Descent into Inferno"	4:45
10.	"Public Burning"	3:41
11.	"Flexing Muscles"	4:00
12.	"Skeleton of Steel"	3:07
13.	"Night for Day"	4:48
Total length:		45:53

In 2004, Inferno was rereleased by Threeman Records and Candlelight Records with a second disc, titled Averno. It contains the following track listing and content:

No.	Title	Length
1.	"When Humanity's Gone"	4:17
2.	"There are Horrors of 1000 Nightmares"	3:26
3.	"Random Guitar"	2:48
4.	"Retaliation" (Video Edit)	3:23
5.	"Albino Flogged in Black" (Video Edit)	4:26
6.	"Retaliation" (Video)
7.	"Albino Flogged in Black" (Video)

== Personnel ==
- Lars-Göran Petrov – vocals
- Uffe Cederlund – guitar
- Alex Hellid – guitar
- Jörgen Sandström – bass
- Peter Stjärnvind – drums
