= Peter Stjärnvind =

Swedish drummer

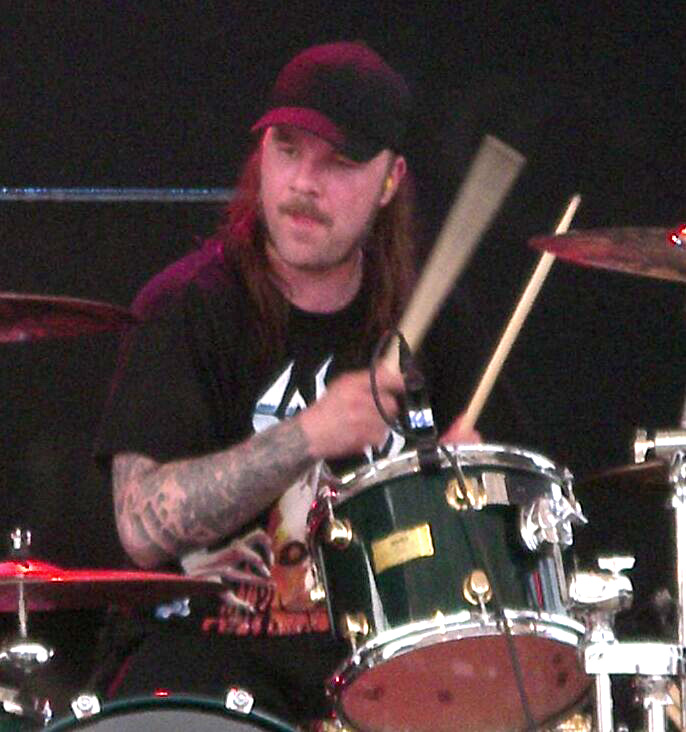
Stjärnvind with Entombed in 2005

Peter Stjärnvind (born 11 August 1973) is a Swedish drummer. His current position is the drummer of Krux and Swedish black metal band Pest, and guitarist and founder of Black Trip. Before that he also played in Loud Pipes, Merciless, Unanimated, Regurgitate, Entombed, Nifelheim, and Face Down. He also appeared in several side-projects, including Born of Fire and Murder Squad.

== Discography ==
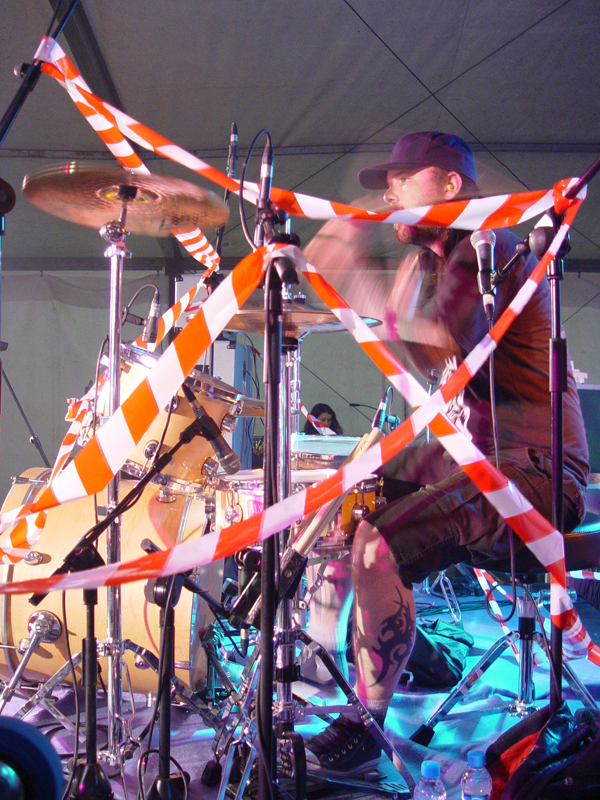
Stjärnvind in 2004

=== with Entombed ===
- Same Difference
- Uprising
- Morning Star
- Inferno
- Unreal Estate (Live)

=== with Face Down ===
- The Twisted Rule The Wicked

=== with Krux ===
- Krux
- II

=== with Loud Pipes ===
- Drunk Forever
- The Downhill Blues

=== with Merciless ===
- Unbound
- Merciless

=== with Murder Squad ===
- Unsane, Insane and Mentally Deranged
- Ravenous, Murderous

=== with Nifelheim ===
- Envoy of Lucifer

=== with Pest ===
- The Crowning Horror

=== with Regurgitate ===
- Effortless Regurgitation of Bright Red Blood

=== with Unanimated ===
- In the Forest of the Dreaming Dead
- Ancient God of Evil
- In the Light of Darkness

=== with Watain ===
- Sworn to the Dark – guest vocals on Stellarvore
