= Entombed (album) =

Compilation album by Entombed
- Released: 1997
- Genre: Death metal
- Length: 46:58
- Label: Earache
- Producer: Tomas Skogsberg

Entombed chronology
DCLXVI: To Ride, Shoot Straight and Speak the Truth (1997)	Entombed (1997)	Same Difference (1998)

Professional ratings
Review scores
Source	Rating
AllMusic	2/5 stars
Collector's Guide to Heavy Metal	9/10

Entombed is a 1997 album by Swedish metal band Entombed that compiles previously released EPs and several previously unreleased tracks.

== Track listing ==
No.	Title	Length
1.	"Out of Hand"	3:08
2.	"God of Thunder" (Kiss cover)	4:40
3.	"Black Breath" (Repulsion cover)	2:29
4.	"Stranger Aeons"	3:26
5.	"Dusk"	2:41
6.	"Shreds of Flesh"	2:04
7.	"Crawl"	5:30
8.	"Forsaken"	3:50
9.	"Bitter Loss"	3:55
10.	"Night of the Vampire" (Roky Erickson cover)	4:59
11.	"State of Emergency" (Stiff Little Fingers cover)	2:34
12.	"Vandal X" (Unsane cover)	7:39
Total length:		46:58

- Tracks 1–3 taken from the Out of Hand EP
- Tracks 4–6 taken from the Stranger Aeons EP
- Tracks 7–9 taken from the Crawl EP
- Track 10 taken from the split single with The New Bomb Turks
- Track 12 includes a hidden song
