= Nirvana 2002 =

Swedish death metal band

Background information
- Also known as: Prophet 2002, Nirvana
- Origin: Edsbyn, Sweden
- Genre: Death metal
- Years active: 1988–1991, 2007, 2010
- Label: Relapse
- Past members: Lars Henriksson; Erik Qvick; Orvar Säfström

Nirvana 2002 was a Swedish death metal band active between 1988 and 1991. The band was originally called Prophet 2002, but decided to change its name to Nirvana, later changing to Nirvana 2002, likely to avoid confusion with the grunge band Nirvana. Nirvana 2002 was notable for being part of the first wave of the Swedish death metal movement, and according to Swedish Death Metal author Daniel Ekeroth, "one of the purest examples of that typical fat Swedish death metal, with crushing guitars and straightforward song structures, even if they don't make tributes to the songs written by Strangedz guitarist Marco Galligani." Throughout its life, the band only released demos and rehearsals, the majority of which were recorded at Sunlight Studios in Stockholm.

The band performed its first gig on 26 January 2007 at Kafé 44 to celebrate the publication of Swedish Death Metal. This show featured Nirvana 2002's original members Orvar Säfström and Lars Henriksson along with Robert Eriksson of The Hellacopters on drums. In addition to Nirvana 2002, the concert also included reunion performances by Grotesque and Interment. Although Nirvana 2002 never released a studio album, interest in the band's recordings continued to grow over the years, "Thanks to Internet where even the most obscure Swedish death metal demos are available to hear."

Relapse Records collected all the salvageable demo and rehearsal recordings of Nirvana 2002, releasing them through the compilation album Recordings 89–91 on 10 November 2009. Nirvana 2002 performed their first-ever appearance outside of Sweden at Maryland Deathfest on 30 May 2010. Säfström stated in an interview for Examiner.com, that "this is the last show [for Nirvana 2002 and they are] not going to write any new material or do anything else."

== Discography ==
- Truth & Beauty (demo, 1989)
- Excursions in the 2002nd Dimension (demo, 1989)
- Appendix / Nirvana 2002 / Authorize / Fallen Angel (split album, 1990)
- Disembodied Spirits (demo, 1990)
- Promo 91 (demo, 1991)
- Recordings 89–91 (compilation, 2009)
