= Crawl (Entombed EP) =

EP by Entombed
- Released: April 1991
- Recorded: Sunlight studios
- Genre: Death metal
- Length: 13:17
- Label: Earache
- Producer: Tomas Skogsberg

Entombed chronology
Crawl (1991)	Stranger Aeons (1991)

Crawl is an EP by the Swedish death metal band Entombed. It was released in 1991 by Earache Records as an appetizer to the new album Clandestine. This EP featured Orvar Säfström from Nirvana 2002 on vocals.

== Track listing ==
1. "Crawl" – 5:32
2. "Forsaken" – 3:50
3. "Bitter Loss" – 3:55
