= Morbus Chron =

Swedish death metal band

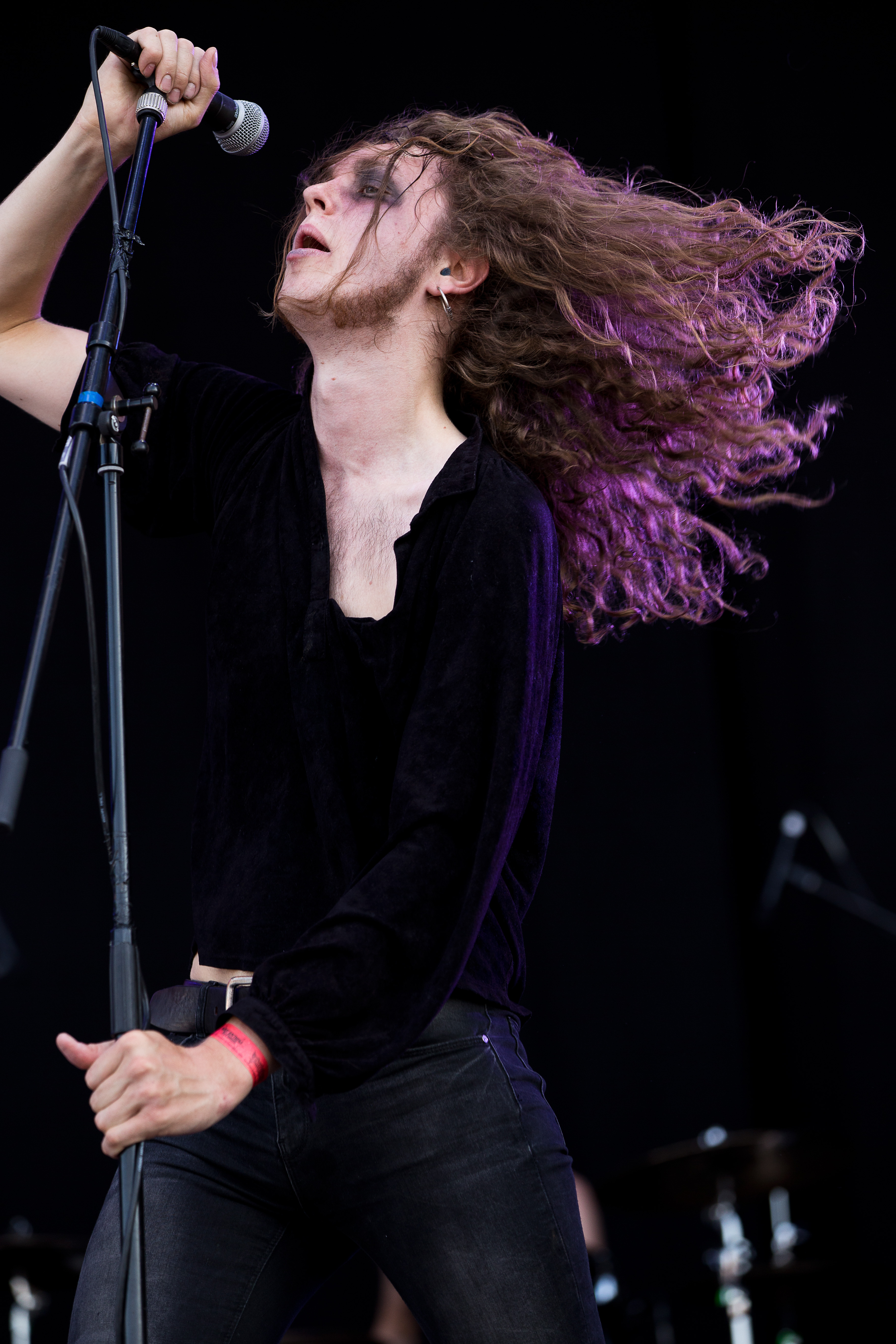
- Robert Andersson at Party.San Open Air 2015

Background information
- Origin: Stockholm, Sweden
- Genres: Death metal, progressive death metal
- Years active: 2007–2015
- Labels: Century Media, Pulverised
- Past members: Robert Andersson; Edvin Aftonfalk; Krizze; Stefan Johansson; Adam Lindmark; Dag Landin

Morbus Chron was a Swedish death metal band from Stockholm. It was named after a misspelling of the disease Morbus Crohn.

== History ==
The band was founded by Robert Andersson (vocals/guitar), Edvin Aftonfalk (guitar) and Stefan Johansson (drums), who were teenagers at that time. They were joined by Adam Lindmark (bass). Johansson left the band and Lindmark switched to the drums. Dag Landin was added as new bassplayer. The band released one demo before publishing their debut EP Splendour of Disease in 2010. 2011 they released their debut album Sleepers in the Rift via Pulverised Records. After that they signed a contract with Century Media, who published their second EP A Saunter Through the Shroud in 2012, followed by the second album Sweven in 2014. The following year the group disbanded.

== Reception ==
Daniel Ekeroth, author of the book "Swedish Death Metal", wrote about the band: "While many metal bands claim to be breaking new ground these days, Morbus Chron is one of the few who really is." Other critics called the album Sweven "essential". German magazine Rock Hard compared the album Sleepers in the Rift with the "all time classic" Left Hand Path by Entombed "regarding quality and intensity".

== Personnel ==
Last known lineup

- Robert Andersson – vocals (2007–2015), guitar (2007–2015, studio only)
- Edvin Aftonfalk – guitar, backing vocals (2007–2015)
- Dag Landin – bass (2008–2015)
- Adam Lindmark – drums (2010–2015), bass (2008–2010)

Past members

- Krizze – bass (2007)
- Stefan – drums (2007–2010)

Live members

- Joakim Scott Andersson - guitar (2011)
- Isak Koskinen Rosemarin – guitar (2014–2015)

== Discography ==
=== Studio albums ===
- Sleepers in the Rift (2011, Pulverised Records)
- Sweven (2014, Century Media)

=== Extended plays ===
- Creepy Creeping Creeps (2010, Detest Records/Me Saco Un Ojo Records)
- A Saunter Through the Shroud (2012, Century Media)

=== Demos ===
- Splendour of Disease (2009, Dybbuk Records)
