= Hollowman =

EP by Entombed
- Released: 1993
- Genre: Death 'n' roll; death metal; groove metal
- Length: 21:36
- Label: Earache; Columbia
- Producer: Entombed and Tomas Skogsberg

Entombed chronology
Stranger Aeons (1991)	Hollowman (1993)	Wreckage (1997)

Hollowman is an EP by Swedish death metal band Entombed, released via Earache Records in 1993. The 1996 reissue featured the bonus track "God of Thunder" which was previously released on the "Out of Hand" single.

It received a three-star rating from AllMusic.

== Track listing ==
No.	Title	Writer(s)	Length
1.	"Hollowman"	Andersson	4:30
2.	"Serpent Speech"	Andersson	2:11
3.	"Wolverine Blues" (instrumental version)	Andersson, Cederlund	2:12
4.	"Bonehouse"	Håkansson, Cederlund, Andersson	3:39
5.	"Put off the Scent"	Hellid, Andersson	3:19
6.	"Hellraiser"	Young	5:43

Bonus track on 1996 reissue
No.	Title	Writer(s)	Original artist	Length
7.	"God of Thunder"	Stanley	Kiss	4:40

== Credits ==
- Tomas Skogsberg – producer, engineer
- Nicke Andersson – drums, design, artwork
- Uffe Cederlund – guitar, tambourine
- Lars Rosenberg – bass
- Alex Hellid – guitar
- Lars-Göran Petrov- vocals
- Entombed – producer, main performer
