= Nicke Andersson =

Swedish musician (born 1972)

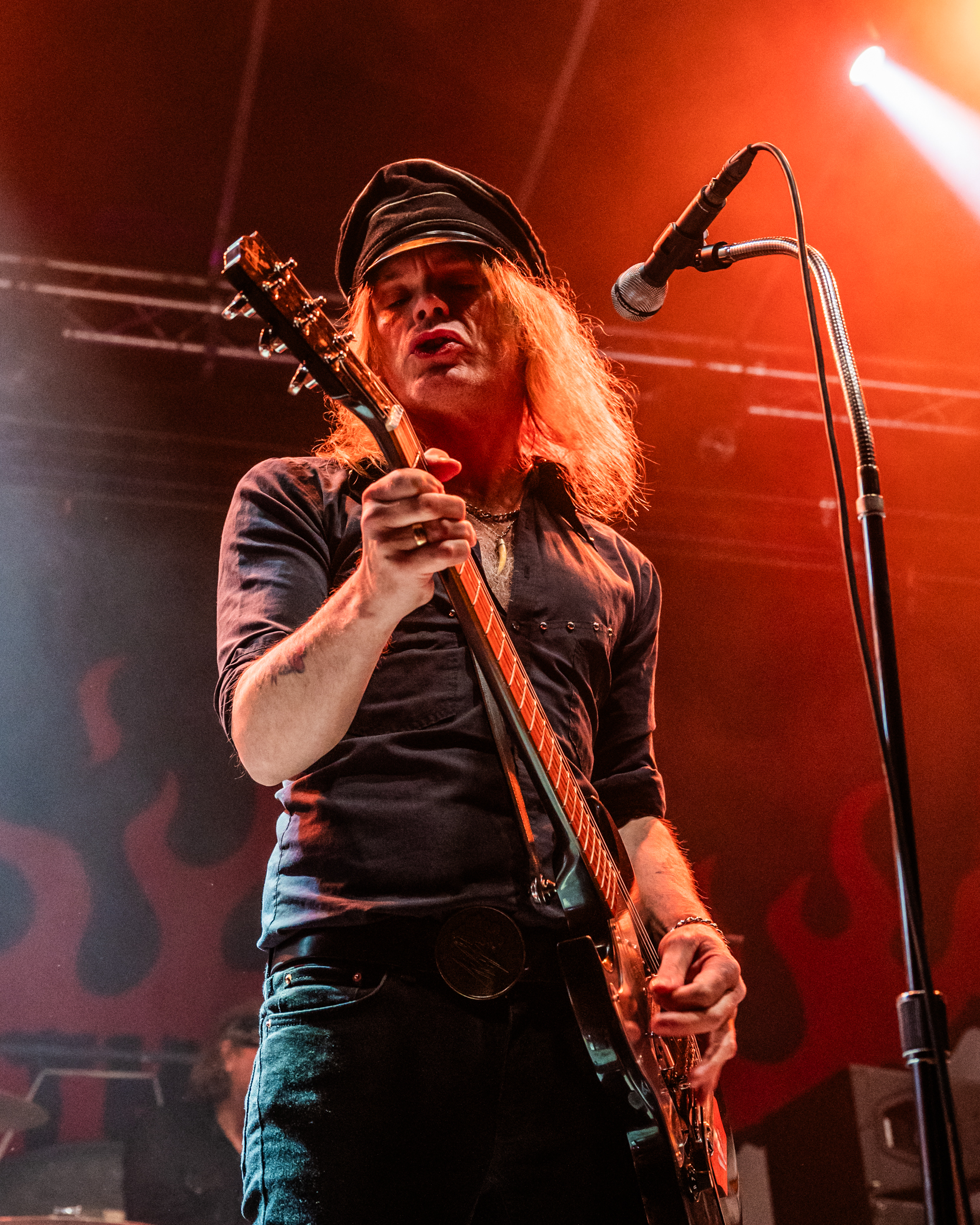
- Andersson performing with the Hellacopters in 2024

Background information
- Also known as: Nick Royale, Nicke Hellacopter, David Lee Hellacopter, Punk Andersson
- Born: Anders Niklas Andersson; 1 August 1972 (age 54); Sweden
- Genres: Garage rock, hard rock, punk rock, soul, death metal
- Occupations: Musician, record producer, songwriter
- Instruments: Vocals, guitar, drums
- Years active: 1981–present

Anders Niklas Andersson (born 1 August 1972), also known as Nicke Andersson, is a Swedish musician best known as the singer and guitarist for the rock band The Hellacopters and drummer for the death metal band Entombed. Besides his work with the Hellacopters and Entombed, Andersson currently plays and writes songs for the soul band The Solution, the death metal band Death Breath, the hard rock band Lucifer, and rock band Imperial State Electric.

Andersson has been involved in over a hundred official releases with different bands, done work as a producer, contributed instrumental and vocal parts, and created artwork for most of the bands he has been involved with.

Anderson has been quoted by contemporary artists as saying "Death metal for me is probably how composers of horror scores see their music to the movies."

== Career ==
Andersson's interest began early in life with Kiss as his favorite band. He soon discovered his childhood friend and future bandmate Kenny Håkanssons's father's record collection and bands such as The Ramones and Sex Pistols. His interest soon turned towards heavier music, trading cassettes and vinyl and writing for fanzines. It wasn't long before Andersson started playing music and was soon playing drums and guitars in rock and metal bands such as Brain Dead Bodies, The Breaking, Belsen Barnen, Parodi, Maximal Skandal, Sons of Satan, Blasphemy, Nihilist and a number of other bands.

=== Entombed ===
Andersson formed Nihilist after answering an ad in Heavy Sound, a record store in Stockholm. When Nihilist broke up in 1989, the same musicians formed Entombed with a different bass player. Andersson was predominantly the drummer in the band but also contributed to bass, guitars and vocals. Entombed derived influence from various different genres, but mostly from death metal on the band's first two albums Left Hand Path (which was recorded when he was 18) and Clandestine. With their third album the group started incorporating more traditional influences from hard rock and heavy metal and the album Wolverine Blues is widely considered to be the origin of death 'n' roll.

=== The Hellacopters ===
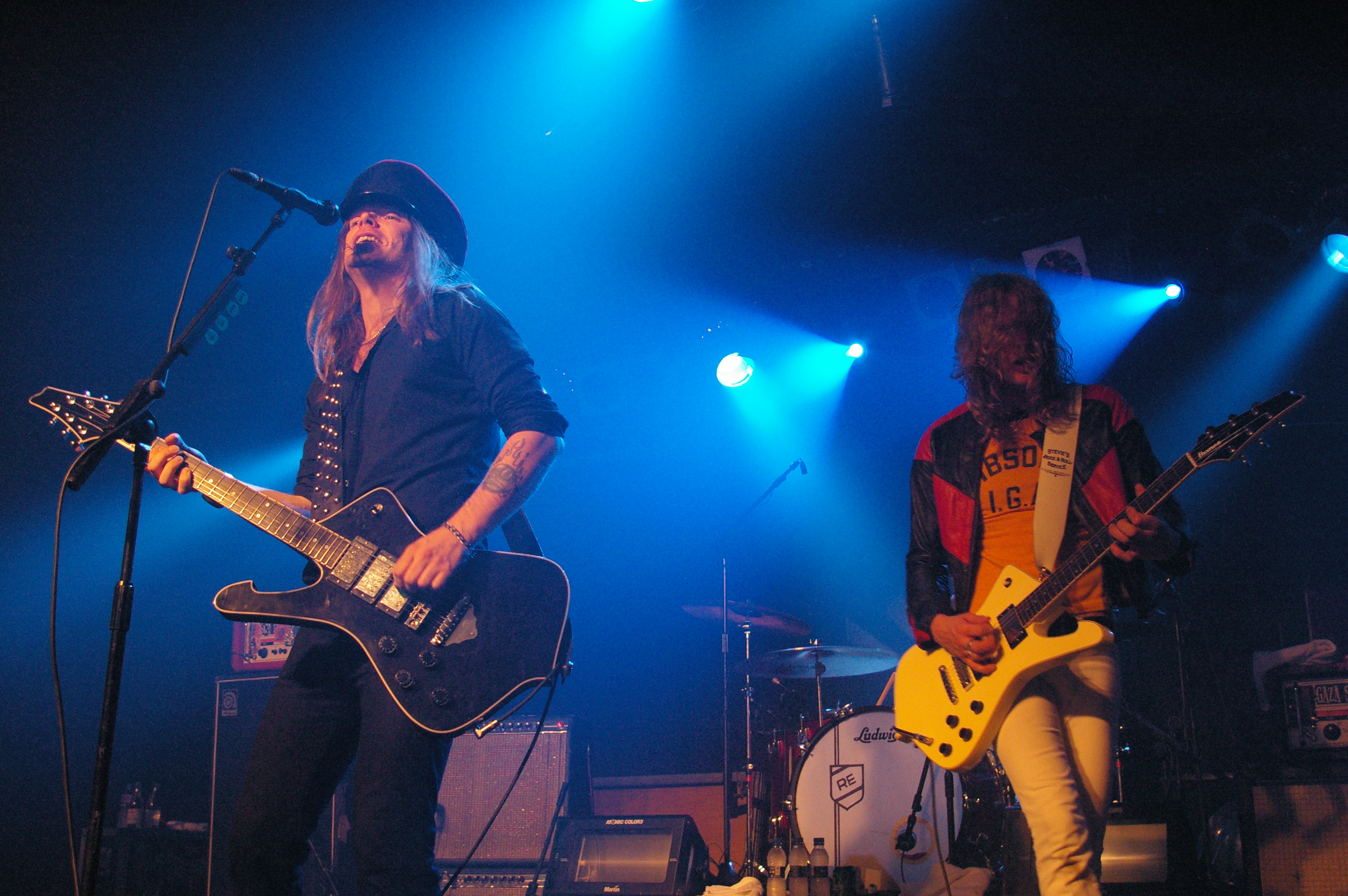
Andersson and Robert Dahlqvist performing with the Hellacopters in 2008

In late 1994, Andersson formed The Hellacopters as a side project with Dregen, Kenny Håkansson and Robert Eriksson, all of whom earlier had been roadies during Andersson's time in Entombed. In January 1995 they released their first single Killing Allan on their own label Psychout Records. Their first full-length album Supershitty to the Max! was released in 1996 and was recorded in 25 hours. It was awarded a Grammis in February 1997. The group recruited Anders Lindström and supported Kiss on their Scandinavian shows in 1997. The album was followed up the next year with Payin' the Dues. Due to the band's success, Andersson left Entombed to focus full-time on his new band. However, the next year guitarist Dregen left The Hellacopters to focus full-time on his other band Backyard Babies. With their third record The Hellacopters changed the direction of their music to a cleaner sound than the early garage/punk rock style. The band continued to tour with temporary replacements before Robert 'Strings' Dahlqvist joined the band as their full-time guitarist. The band continued to release albums and tour extensively in Scandinavia, Europe and other parts of the world as well as opening for The Rolling Stones on two shows in 2002. In 2006 The Hellacopters joined forces with The Hives, Backyard Babies, The Soundtrack of Our Lives and Millencolin and embarked on a successful tour throughout Sweden. The band broke up after the release of their seventh full-length album, Head off, a collection of cover songs, which was followed in 2008 by a last tour through Europe and Scandinavia.

=== Scott Morgan collaborations ===
While on tour in USA with The Hellacopters, the band played several shows in the same venue as the former Sonic's Rendezvous Band singer Scott Morgan. This led to the formation of The Hydromatics which went on to release their first record Parts Unknown in 1999. Andersson and Morgan teamed up once again in 2004 this time under the name The Solution to release Communicate, which was followed by Will Not Be Televised in 2007.

=== Death Breath ===
In 2005 Death Breath was formed by Andersson and Robert Pehrsson. Soon Scott Carlson and Erik Wallin joined, making the band's lineup complete. The band plays metal music inspired by some of Andersson's favorite early extreme metal bands such as Venom, Autopsy and Celtic Frost. The band released Stinking Up the Night in 2006 and Let It Stink in 2007.

=== Cold Ethyl ===
After the breakup of The Hellacopters, Andersson formed Cold Ethyl along with Thomas Eriksson, Tobias Egge and Dolf De Borst from The Datsuns, who opened together with "Demons" for The Hellacopters during the later part of The Tour Before the Fall. The band states that they have no interest in recording or releasing any material at this time and that the only way to experience the band is through their live shows. The band played their first show at Debaser Slussen in Stockholm early 2009 and held a short tenure at the club Fanclub.

=== Imperial State Electric ===
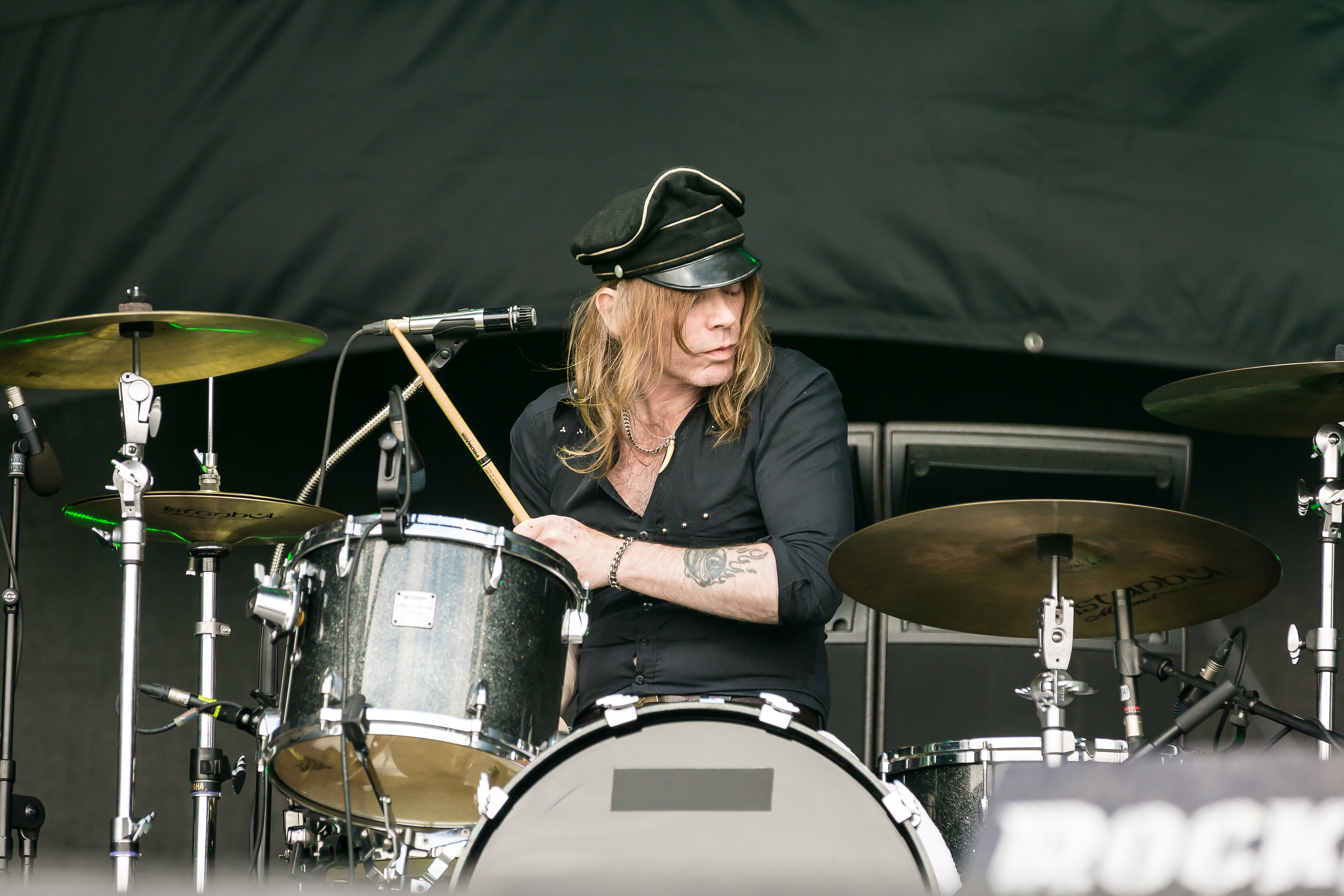
Andersson playing with Lucifer in 2022

At first a Nicke Andersson solo recording project Imperial State Electric soon evolved into a touring band with the same members as Cold Ethyl. They toured Scandinavia and Europe during 2010–2011 on the back of the first self-titled record (released Jan. 2010). I.S.E played mostly headline shows and festivals but there were also support act slots to Kiss and Guns N' Roses. For the recording of the second album "Pop War" (released 9 March 2012) Imperial State Electric was declared a band proper. The "Pop War" tour was unofficially started with two gigs supporting The Hives, one "by invitation only" secret gig on 28 March 2012 and one official The Hives gig three days later. The Imperial State Electric Pop War tour officially started on 4 April at Katalin in Uppsala, Sweden.

=== Lucifer ===
In March 2017, it was announced that Andersson had joined the band Lucifer as drummer. He had started writing songs with his now-wife and Lucifer vocalist Johanna Sadonis in 2016, when two of its members had left. As he is a multi-instrumentalist, Lucifer recorded their second album, Lucifer II, in Andersson's home studio without a complete band, only the addition of guitarist Robin Tidebrink. The band's third and fourth albums, Lucifer III (2021) and Lucifer IV (2022), were each nominated for Best Hard Rock/Metal at the Grammis awards.

=== Other work ===
"...to have Nicke in the band is the piece de resistance you know, cause he is such a solid musician to begin with, just fundamental, knows music, knows chords, knows melodies, his technique is superior and he has the connection to the music. He gets it, you know, he understands how it all works together. So he's able to work with in the context of it and bring something to it."

— Wayne Kramer of the MC5.

In 1998 Andersson, with former bandmate Dregen, Ginger (from the Wildhearts) and Thomas Skogsberg, formed Supershit 666. The band's music was very reminiscent of the early Hellacopters sound. The band released a self-titled EP in 1999 but never played live. However, Dregen and Ginger have both expressed interest in playing together again, possibly as Supershit 666. After releasing By the Grace of God, Andersson was invited to join Wayne Kramer and the remaining members of the MC5 for their reunion tour in 2003 and 2004. In 2004 Andersson joined up with Swedish punk veteran Johan Johansson from KSMB and Strindbergs. They released the single "(Komma ut ur matchen) NU!", a Swedish version of "(Gotta get som action) NOW!" They were joined by musicians such as Anders "Boba" Lindström and Dregen from Hellacopters and Sulo from Diamond Dogs. The single also contained the song "8 pm", an English version of the KSMB song "Klockan 8". Along with fellow Hellacopter member Robert Dahlqvist, Andersson recorded drums and guitars for Swedish singer-songwriter Stefan Sundströms 2004 album Hjärtats melodi. Apart from being a producer/co-producer with his own bands, Andersson produced Swedish rock band Dollhouse's second album, The Royal Rendezevous, in Acetone Studio, Stockholm in late 2005. Also at Acetone Studio he played on Neil Leyton's The Betrayal of the Self album along with Backyard Babies's guitarist Dregen. The next year he produced the Backyard Babies's fifth studio album, People Like People Like People Like Us. In 2009, it was announced that Andersson and Neil Leyton have a side project called The Point, with a 7" single titled "Give it a try" due to be released in the spring of 2010.

== Musical equipment ==
=== Guitars ===
- Greco 1977 Les Paul Standard – chambered-body Tobacco Sunburst. It has three custom-fitted pickups, a DiMarzio Super Distortion in the bridge position and DiMarzio Classic PAFs in the middle and neck positions. This guitar was given as a birthday gift to Nicke Andersson on his 40th birthday, August 2012. All custom work and fitting done by luthier Janne Helge.
- Berg Electric Guitars "Goblin" – custom built for Nicke Andersson with a single Dimarzio Super Distortion humbucker in the bridge position.

High gloss black with Bent maple bindings (appearing to be cream plastic to the naked eye) on body, head and neck. Made by then-apprentice luthier Thomas Berg, as a qualifying piece of work. Mr Berg has also built The Imperial model guitar (based on the early hard radius edge body Epiphone Coronet with custom features including a Crestwood headstock) for Tobias Egge and Nicke.

- Berg Electric Guitars "Imperial" built for Imperial State Electric guitarists Tobias Egge and Nicke Andersson by Thomas Berg of Berg Electric Guitars.

Based on the symmetrical shaped, hard radius edge body Epiphone Coronet (later Coronet models had more rounded edges on body) Custom features include a Crestwood deluxe style bound, inline headstock, J200 type inlay, single Dimarzio DP100 and a wraparound bridge.

- Greco Les Paul Standard – black with white body binding.
- Eagle 12-string – "The Eaglebacker", a 12-string Rickenbacker clone.
- TYM Guitars The Royale – Andersson's signature guitar.
- TYM Guitars Wosrite Black Beauty
- TYM Guitars Johnny Ramone model
- TYM Guitars Versatone
- Mosrite – Ventures Model reissue
- Halkan Crestwood Deluxe – Replica made in Sweden
- Daguet – Epiphone Crestwood replica.
- Gibson SG Custom – Creamwhite finish with three humbuckers
- Mosrite Ventures model
- Gordon Smith GS LP Junior – Single cutaway
- Gordon Smith GS LP Junior – Double cutaway
- Gibson Les Paul Junior – Single P-90 pickup
- Gibson Les Paul Custom
- Iceman – Custom built by Sengenbjerg with three humbuckers
- DiPinto Mach IV – All black finish two single coil pickups
- Gibson Flying V – Converted to left-hand
- Edwards Flying V
- Hagström bass

=== Amplification ===
- Orange OTR-12 amplifier
- Marshall Amplifiers
- Fender Twin Reverb
- Lehnert Rambler 25w combo

== Band timeline ==
- Nihilist (drums (1987–1989))
- Mezzrow (bass (1988–1989))
- Entombed (drums (1989-1997, 2016–present), vocals (1991))
- The Hellacopters (guitars, vocals (1994–2008, 2016–present))
- Daemon (Drums (1996))
- Supershit 666 (as Nick Royale: drums (1999))
- The Hydromatics (as Nick Royale: drums, percussion, backing vocals (1999))
- Kurt-Sunes med Helveteshundarna (vocals, guitars (2004))
- Death Breath (drums, guitars) (2005–present)
- The Solution (as Nick Royale: drums, percussion, guitars, backing vocals (2004–present))
- Imperial State Electric (vocals, guitars (2008–present))
- Lucifer (drums, guitar, bass (2017–present))

== Selected discography ==
Year	Bands	Title	Notes
1988	Mezzrow	Frozen Soul (Demo)	Bass
1989	Mezzrow	The Cross of Tormention (Demo)	Bass
1990	Entombed	Left Hand Path	Drums, bass, artwork
1991	Dismember	Like an Ever Flowing Stream	Lead guitar
1991	Entombed	Clandestine	Drums, lead vocals, artwork
1993	Entombed	Hollowman	Drums, arrangements
1993	Entombed	Wolverine Blues	Drums, guitar, artwork
1996	The Hellacopters	Supershitty to the Max!	Vocals, guitar, maracas
1996	Daemon	Seven Deadly Sins	Guitars, drums
1997	Entombed	DCLXVI: To Ride, Shoot Straight and Speak the Truth	Drums, percussion
1997	Entombed	Entombed	Drums, guitar
1997	The Hellacopters	Payin' the Dues	Vocals, guitar, piano, percussion
1997	Entombed	Wreckage	Drums
1997	The Hellacopters/Gluecifer	Respect the Rock	Vocals, guitar
1998	The Backyard Babies	Total13	Songwriting
1998	Electric Frankenstein/Hellacopters	Electric Frankenstein Vs. The Hellacopters	Vocals guitar
1999	The Hellacopters	Grande Rock	Vocals, guitar
1999	Supershit 666	Supershit 666	Drums
1999	The Hydromatics	Part Unknown	Drums, percussion backing vocals
1999	The Hydromatics	Fluid Drive	Drums, percussion
2000	The Hellacopters	High Visibility	Vocals, guitar, clavinet, percussion
2000	The Hellacopters	Cream of the Crap Vol. 1	Vocals, guitar
2001	The Hellacopters/The Flaming Sideburns	White Trash Soul	Vocals, guitar
2002	Scarve	Luminiferous	Songwriting
2002	The Hellacopters	By the Grace of God	Vocals, guitar, percussion, piano
2002	Entombed	Sons of Satan Praise the Lord	Drums
2002	The Hellacopters	Cream of the Crap Vol. 2	Vocals, guitar
2003	Mensen	Oslo City	Mixing, percussion
2004	Kurt-Sunes med Helveteshundarna	(Komma Ut Ur Matchen) NU!	Guitar, vocals
2004	The Solution	Communicate!	Production, drums, percussion, guitar, backing vocals
2004	MC5	Purity Accuracy	Guitar, vocals
2004	Stefan Sundström	Hjärtats Melodi	Drums, backing vocals
2005	The Hellacopters	Rock & Roll Is Dead	Vocals, guitar, percussion, piano
2005	Nihilist	Nihlist (1987–1989)	Drums, guitar, artwork
2005	Dollhouse	The Royal Rendezevouz	Production
2006	Death Breath	Stinking Up the Night	Drums, guitar
2006	Neil Leyton	The Betrayal of the Self	Guitar
2006	Jeff Walker Und Die Flüffers	Welcome To Carcass Cuntry	Vocals
2006	The Hellacopters	Air Raid Serenades	Vocals, guitar, percussion
2006	Backyard Babies	People Like People Like People Like Us	Production
2007	Death Breath	Let It Stink	Drums, guitar, bass
2007	The Solution	Will Not Be Televised	Production, drums, percussion, guitar, backing vocals, mixing, artwork
2008	The Hellacopters	Head Off	Vocals, guitar, percussion
2008	Bullet	Bite the Bullet	Mixing
2009	The Bitter Twins	Global Panic!	Lead guitar, vocals
2010	Imperial State Electric	Imperial State Electric	Vocals, guitar, bass, drums, percussion, keyboard
2010	Stefan Sundström	5 Dagar i Augusti	Piano, backing vocals, percussion
2010	Necronaut	Necronaut	Lead guitar
2011	Imperial State Electric	In Concert! EP	Vocals, guitar
2011	Stefan Sundström	Jonny Dunders Elektriska Circus Live!	Piano
2011	Morbus Chron	Sleepers in the Rift	Producer, Recording, Engineering, Mixing
2012	'77	High Decibels	Production, mixing, additional vocals
2012	Imperial State Electric	Pop War	Vocals, guitar, production, engineering, artwork
2013	Imperial State Electric	Reptile Brain Music	Vocals, guitar, production, engineering, artwork
2013	Imperial State Electric	Radio Electric	Vocals, guitar, production, engineering, artwork
2014	Imperial State Electric	Eyes EP	Vocals, guitar, production, engineering, artwork
2015	Imperial State Electric	Honk Machine	Vocals, guitar, production, engineering, artwork
2015	Honeymoon Disease	The Transcendence	Co-Producer
2016	Imperial State Electric	All Through the Night	Vocals, guitar, production, engineering, artwork
2018	Imperial State Electric	Anywhere Loud (Live)	Vocals, guitar, production, engineering, artwork
2018	Lucifer	Lucifer II	Drums, guitar, bass
2020	Lucifer	Lucifer III	Drums
2022	The Hellacopters	Eyes Of Oblivion	Vocals, guitar, bass, percussion, production, engineering
