= Sons of Satan Praise the Lord =

Compilation album by Entombed
- Released: 11 November 2002
- Genre: Death 'n' roll; death metal
- Length: 91:20
- Label: Music for Nations

Entombed chronology
Morning Star (2001)	Sons of Satan Praise the Lord (2002)	Inferno (2003)

Professional ratings
Review scores
Source	Rating
AllMusic	2.5/5 stars

Sons of Satan Praise the Lord is a compilation album by Swedish death metal band Entombed. It contains most of the studio covers that the band has ever performed on a double disc compilation (Hey On Glue's 'Sentimental Funeral' from the Black Juju EP is not included).

== Track listing ==
=== Disc one ===
No.	Title	Length
1.	"Black Breath" (Repulsion cover)	2:31
2.	"Albino Flogged in Black" (Stillborn cover)	6:27
3.	"March of the S.O.D" (Stormtroopers of Death cover)	1:31
4.	"Sergeant D. & The S.O.D." (Stormtroopers of Death cover)	2:26
5.	"Some Velvet Morning" (Lee Hazlewood cover)	3:51
6.	"One Track Mind" (Motörhead cover)	5:03
7.	"Hollywood Babylon" (The Misfits cover)	2:27
8.	"Night of the Vampire" (Roky Erickson cover)	5:01
9.	"God of Thunder" (Kiss cover)	4:43
10.	"Something I Learned Today" (Hüsker Dü cover)	2:11
11.	"21st Century Schizoid Man" (King Crimson cover)	3:20
12.	"Black Juju" (Alice Cooper cover)	3:48
13.	"Amazing Grace" (punk version)	1:47

=== Disc two ===
No.	Title	Length
1.	"Satan" (The Dwarves cover)	1:15
2.	"Hellraiser" (Christopher Young cover)	5:49
3.	"Kick Out the Jams" (MC5 cover)	2:52
4.	"Yout' Juice" (Bad Brains cover)	2:48
5.	"Bursting Out" (Venom cover)	3:45
6.	"State of Emergency" (Stiff Little Fingers cover)	2:37
7.	"Under the Sun" (Black Sabbath cover)	5:52
8.	"Vandal X" (Unsane cover)	1:53
9.	"Tear It Loose" (Twisted Sister cover)	3:20
10.	"Scottish Hell" (Dead Horse cover)	3:10
11.	"The Ballad of Hollis Brown" (Bob Dylan cover)	4:08
12.	"Mesmerization Eclipse" (Captain Beyond cover)	4:02
13.	"Lost" (Jerry's Kids cover)	3:13
14.	"Amazing Grace" (Mellow Drunk version)	1:40
