= Serpent Saints: The Ten Amendments =

Studio album by Entombed
- Released: 25 June 2007
- Studio: Sound Land Studios, Alta Studio Barn, Gomorrah Rehearsal Studio and Threeman HQ
- Genre: Death metal
- Length: 41:24
- Label: Threeman Recordings
- Producer: Entombed

Entombed chronology
Unreal Estate (2004)	Serpent Saints: The Ten Amendments (2007)

Professional ratings
Review scores
Source	Rating
About.com	4/5 stars
AllMusic	3.5/5 stars
Blabbermouth.net	7/10

Serpent Saints: The Ten Amendments is the ninth album by Swedish death metal band Entombed, released in June 2007. It is the first album with bassist Nico Elgstrand and drummer Olle Dahlstedt, as well as the band's first without longtime guitarist Uffe Cederlund. It is also the final album of the regular Entombed lineup, as following this release, the band split in 2014 with Lars-Göran Petrov continuing with the majority of this lineup (sans Hellid) in his own version of Entombed called Entombed AD, releasing three more albums and touring worldwide until his death in 2021.

Even more than Morning Star, the album was largely considered a throwback to the band's traditional death metal roots, with the hard rock-influenced sections being eschewed almost entirely.

== Track listing ==
No.	Title	Length
1.	"Serpent Saints"	5:04
2.	"Masters of Death"	5:00
3.	"Amok"	4:44
4.	"Thy Kingdom Coma"	4:07
5.	"When in Sodom"	5:40
6.	"In the Blood"	4:39
7.	"Ministry"	2:43
8.	"The Dead, the Dying and the Dying to Be Dead"	3:01
9.	"Warfare, Plague, Famine, Death"	3:20
10.	"Love Song for Lucifer"	3:06
Total length:		41:24

== Personnel ==
- Lars-Göran Petrov – vocals
- Alex Hellid – guitars
- Nico Elgstrand – bass
- Olle Dahlstedt – drums
