= Clandestine (album) =

Studio album by Entombed
- Released: 12 November 1991 (Europe) 11 February 1992 (North America)
- Recorded: 1991
- Genre: Death metal
- Length: 43:41
- Label: Earache, Relativity
- Producer: Tomas Skogsberg

Entombed chronology
Left Hand Path (1990)	Clandestine (1991)	Wolverine Blues (1993)

Clandestine is the second studio album by Swedish death metal band Entombed. It was released in Europe by Earache Records on 12 November 1991 and in North America by Relativity Records on 11 February 1992. Along with Entombed's preceding album, Clandestine helped establish a distinctively Swedish sound in the death metal genre.

This is the only Entombed album on which original vocalist L.G. Petrov does not appear. Petrov was fired from the band prior to the production of Clandestine due to personal disputes. The band then recorded the Crawl EP with vocalist Orvar Säfström, but he did not remain for the album recording and the song "Crawl" was re-recorded for the Clandestine album. Drummer Nicke Andersson provided vocals on the album while Johnny Dordevic, formerly of Carnage, was hired as the band's vocalist for the ensuing tour.

== Reception ==
Professional ratings
Review scores
Source	Rating
AllMusic	4.5/5 stars
Collector's Guide to Heavy Metal	9/10

AllMusic gave Clandestine a rating of four and a half stars. In October 2016, Clandestine was inducted into the Decibel magazine Hall of Fame, becoming the second Entombed album to be featured in the Decibel Hall of Fame.

== Track listing ==
No.	Title	Writer(s)	Length
1.	"Living Dead"	Nicke Andersson, Alex Hellid	4:26
2.	"Sinners Bleed"	Andersson, Uffe Cederlund	5:10
3.	"Evilyn"	Andersson, Cederlund, Lars Rosenberg	5:05
4.	"Blessed Be"	Andersson, Cederlund, Hellid, Rosenberg	4:46
5.	"Stranger Aeons"	Andersson, Cederlund, Kenny Håkansson	3:25
6.	"Chaos Breed"	Andersson, Cederlund, Håkansson	4:52
7.	"Crawl"	Andersson	6:13
8.	"Severe Burns"	Andersson	4:01
9.	"Through the Collonades"	Andersson, Håkansson	5:39
Total length:			43:41

=== 2008 re-issue ===
Clandestine was re-issued as part of the Earache Classic Series with a DVD. The DVD is identical to their Monkey Puss DVD.

DVD
No.	Title	Length
1.	"Left Hand Path" (video clip)
2.	"Stranger Aeons" (video clip)
3.	"Hollowman" (video clip)
4.	"Wolverine Blues" (video clip)
5.	"Night of the Vampire" (video clip)
6.	"Living Dead"
7.	"Revel in Flesh"
8.	"Stranger Aeons"
9.	"Crawl"
10.	"But Life Goes On"
11.	"Sinners Bleed"
12.	"Evilyn"
13.	"The Truth Beyond"
14.	"Drowned"
15.	"Left Hand Path"

== Personnel ==
- Nicke Andersson – drums, vocals, art direction, logo, back cover
- Uffe Cederlund – guitar, backing vocals
- Lars Rosenberg – bass
- Alex Hellid – guitar
- Tomas Skogsberg – production, engineering
- Entombed – production, engineering
- Dan Seagrave – art direction, cover art

Johnny Dordevic is listed on the sleeve as the lead singer, but he does not appear on the album. All vocals were recorded by Nicke Andersson.
