= Fernando Colunga Ultimate Experience =

Serbian metal band

- Origin: Požarevac, Serbia
- Genres: Death and roll, grindcore, death metal
- Years active: 2010–present
- Labels: Ciklonizacija Records

Fernando Colunga Ultimate Experience (shorten as FCUE) is a Serbian metal band from Požarevac. The name of the band comes from the Mexican soap opera actor Fernando Colunga Olivares.

== Band history ==
The band was formed in 2010 by the actual line-up of Marko Živković, Stefan Milenković and Antonio Jovanović. FCUE started as an informal side-project, formed mainly for recreative purposes; mixing the musical bases of genres like grindcore, with some comical and parodic lyrics about soap operas and various cultural icons like Steven Seagal.

The name of the band was inspired by the famous Mexican actor, Fernando Colunga; who is compared by the line-up with the American actor Chuck Norris, due to the vast number of characters that Fernando Colunga interpreted in his career. Nevertheless, the band took a more professional course in the next years, starting with the releasing of their album Toxic hog cult, leaving away the grindcore background, and starting to show Death and roll influences.

In 2019, the band gained considerable notoriety by the Latin American media (particularly in Mexico), given the characteristic name of the band. In the same year, FCUE released the single Inhale My Misery. The online magazine Helly Cherry described the new single of FCUE as a "stylistically completely different from everything recorded by the band during its first three years". A short time later, the band made the publication of their following single: La Usurpadora. This song continued with the musical maturation of the band, enjoying a relatively positive acceptance among the new fans.

A demo song, Dia de Muertos, was published in November the 1st (Date in which the Day of the Dead is celebrated in Mexico). According to the German music distributor Fangtasia Music, this work has an approach more similar to that of the oldest songs of the band, combining the styles of slamming death metal and grindcore.

== Discography ==
=== Studio albums ===
- Toxic Hog Cult (2012)

=== Singles ===
- Jama se preljeva (2011)
- Charade (2012)
- Inhale My Misery (2019)
- La Usurpadora (2019)
- A perfect day to be dead (2023)

=== Demos ===
- Telenovela 1 (2010)
- Sangriento e brutal telenovela (2010)
- Scorched Dominion of Human Waste (2010)
- Nekromansa (2015)
- Dia de muertos (2019)
