= DCLXVI: To Ride, Shoot Straight and Speak the Truth =

Studio album by Entombed
- Released: 3 March 1997
- Recorded: Mid-1996 at Sunlight Studio (Stockholm, Sweden)
- Genres: Death 'n' roll; groove metal; stoner metal
- Length: 39:45
- Label: Threeman Recordings
- Producer: Tomas Skogsberg

Entombed chronology
Wolverine Blues (1993)	DCLXVI: To Ride, Shoot Straight and Speak the Truth (1997)	Entombed (1997)

Singles from DCLXVI: To Ride, Shoot Straight and Speak the Truth
- 1. "Wreckage" Released: 6 October 1997 (EP)

Professional ratings
Review scores
Source	Rating
AllMusic	2.5/5 stars
Blabbermouth.net	8/10
Chronicles of Chaos	9/10
Collector's Guide to Heavy Metal	10/10

DCLXVI: To Ride, Shoot Straight and Speak the Truth is the fourth album by the Swedish metal band Entombed, released in 1997. It shows a continuation of the death 'n' roll sound previously established on 1993's Wolverine Blues, but eschews most traces of hardcore punk and traditional death metal in favor of a stoner rock and garage rock-influenced sound.

DCLXVI is 666 in Roman numerals. The cover art features a statuette of the Aztec god Mictlantecuhtli.

The album was Metal Hammer magazine's #2 album of 1997. It was beaten by UK band Feeder's debut album Polythene.

== Track listing ==
No.	Title	Writer(s)	Length
1.	"To Ride, Shoot Straight and Speak the Truth"	Andersson, Hellid	3:12
2.	"Like This with the Devil"	Andersson	2:12
3.	"Lights Out"	Andersson	3:35
4.	"Wound"	Cederlund	2:43
5.	"They"	Hellid	4:05
6.	"Somewhat Peculiar"	Andersson, Hellid	3:20
7.	"DCLXVI" (instrumental)	Petrov	1:42
8.	"Parasight"	Andersson, Hellid	2:50
9.	"Damn Deal Done"	Andersson, Cederlund, Hellid	3:26
10.	"Put Me Out"	Cederlund	2:23
11.	"Just as Sad"	Andersson	1:51
12.	"Boats"	Hellid	3:07
13.	"Uffe's Horrorshow"	Cederlund	1:18
14.	"Wreckage"	Andersson	4:01
Total length:			39:45

A limited digipak edition came with a bonus CD titled Family Favourites featuring four cover songs:

Bonus tracks
No.	Title	Writer(s)	Original artist	Length
15.	"Kick Out the Jams"	Tyner, Kramer, Smith, Davis, Thompson	MC5	2:49
16.	"21st Century Schizoid Man"	Fripp, McDonald, Lake, Giles, Sinfield	King Crimson	3:19
17.	"Bursting Out"	Bray, Dunn, Lant	Venom	3:43
18.	"Under the Sun"	Butler, Iommi, Osbourne, Ward	Black Sabbath	5:45

== Personnel ==
Entombed

- Lars-Göran Petrov – vocals, piano
- Jörgen Sandström – bass
- Uffe "Monster" Cederlund – guitar
- Alex Hellid – guitar, artwork
- Nicke Andersson – drums, artwork

Production

- Entombed – produced
- Tomas Skogsberg – produced, engineered, mixed, recorded
- Enginestudio – artwork, design
- Guerilla Art – artwork
- Neil Rapi – photography
- Steve Gurney – live sound
- Fred Estby – assist

== Trivia ==
The song "To Ride, Shoot Straight and Speak the Truth" was featured in the 2003 skateboarding video game Tony Hawk's Underground.
