= Morning Star (Entombed album) =

Studio album by Entombed
- Released: 3 September 2001
- Recorded: March 2001
- Genre: Death metal; death 'n' roll; thrash metal
- Length: 36:53
- Label: Music for Nations

Entombed chronology
Uprising (2000)	Morning Star (2001)	Sons of Satan Praise the Lord (2002)

Professional ratings
Review scores
Source	Rating
AllMusic	4.5/5 stars
Blabbermouth.net	7/10
Collector's Guide to Heavy Metal	9/10

Morning Star is the seventh studio album by Swedish metal band Entombed, released on 3 September 2001. The album is more experimental than previous efforts, and shows the band returning to a more traditional death metal sound overall, though without abandoning elements of death 'n' roll. It also introduces a handful of straightforward, fast-paced death/thrash tracks, a first for the band at the time.

== Musical style, writing, and composition ==
The lyrics for the song "I for an Eye" were written by Orvar Säfström who was also stand-in vocalist for the band in 1991 on the EP Crawl.

The song "When It Hits Home" is influenced by the 1997 film The Devil's Advocate.

The lyrics to "Chief Rebel Angel" are in several cases based on quotes from The Devil's Advocate film:

- John Milton: "I'm here on the ground with my nose in it since the whole thing began! I've nurtured every sensation man has been inspired to have! I cared about what he wanted and I never judged him! Why? Because I never rejected him, in spite of all his imperfections! I'm a fan of man!"
- John Milton: "Don't get too cocky, my boy. No matter how good you are... ...don't let them see you coming. That's the gaffe, my friend. You gotta keep yourself small. Innocuous. Be the little guy. You know, the nerd, the leper. The shitkicking surfer. Look at me. Underestimated from day one. You'd never think I was a master of the universe, would you?"
- John Milton: "I have been watching. Couldn't help myself. Watching. Waiting. Holding my breath. But I'm no puppeteer, Kevin. I don't make things happen. Doesn't work like that. ... It's like butterfly wings. Once touched, they never get off the ground. I only set the stage. You pull your own strings."

== Reception ==
The album received a stellar review from AllMusic, ending with the recommendation: "Any fan of quality underground metal should find this to be a superb effort from an underrated band."

== Track listing ==
All tracks are written by Uffe Cederlund, except where noted.

No.	Title	Writer(s)	Length
1.	"Chief Rebel Angel"	Jörgen Sandström, Cederlund, Alex Hellid	4:40
2.	"I for an Eye"	Cederlund, Orvar Säfström	3:10
3.	"Bringer of Light"	Hellid	4:02
4.	"Ensemble of the Restless"		2:38
5.	"Out of Heaven"		3:39
6.	"Young Man Nihilist"		2:46
7.	"Year One Now"	Sandström, Hellid	1:56
8.	"Fractures"		3:36
9.	"When It Hits Home"	Hellid	2:24
10.	"City of Ghosts"		2:32
11.	"About to Die"		2:14
12.	"Mental Twin"		3:16
Total length:			36:53

== Personnel ==
- Lars-Göran Petrov – vocals
- Uffe Cederlund – guitar
- Alex Hellid – guitar
- Jörgen Sandström – bass
- Peter Stjärnvind – drums
