= The Hydromatics =

US musical group

- Origin: Michigan, The Netherlands, Sweden
- Genres: Garage rock, punk rock, garage punk
- Years active: 1999-present
- Labels: White Jazz, Suburban, Cargo, Freakshow, Pitshark
- Members: Scott Morgan; Theo Brouwer; Tony Slug; Ries Doms; Kent Steedman
- Past members: Nick Royale; Andy Frost; Laurent Ciron

The Hydromatics is an American garage rock band, consisting of Nick Royale, Scott Morgan, Theo Brouwer and Tony Slug.

== History ==
The Hydromatics was formed Nick Royale from The Hellacopters and Tony Slug from Amsterdam punk band The Nitwitz planned to record a series of Sonic's Rendezvous Band cover songs, but the project was long on hold due to the hectic touring schedules of The Hellacopters. Slug contacted Sonic's Rendezvous Band founder Scott Morgan, however, and during the Hellacopters' second visit to Detroit, Morgan happily accepted the offer to record with Slug and Royale. In 1999, Morgan and Royale flew to Amsterdam and met with Slug and his bandmate, bassist Theo Brouwer. The Hydromatics were born.

The band rehearsed for six days, played three shows in Amsterdam and wrote some new material for the band's debut album, Parts Unknown. A six-week tour through Europe resulted in the six-track live album Fluid Drive. Thereafter, Royale decided to leave the band due to his commitments to The Hellacopters and was replaced by Andy Frost.

In 2001, the band released their second album, Powerglide. It contains seven Sonic's Rendezvous Band covers and seven new tracks. Soon after its release, Brouwer exited the band and moved to Spain, and Laurent Ciron was his replacement. The band toured, then took an extended hiatus while the members concentrated on various other bands. Morgan and Royale reconnected and formed the soul band The Solution. When the hiatus for The Hydromatics ended, its new members were Kent Steedman (formerly of Australian band The Celibate Rifles) on guitar and Ries Doms on drums.

== Members ==
Current members

- Scott Morgan - lead vocals, guitar, harmonica
- Tony Slug - guitar
- Ries Doms - drums
- Theo Brouwer - bass guitar
- Kent Steedman - guitar

Former members

- Nicke Andersson - drums, percussion, backing vocals
- Laurent Ciron - bass guitar
- Andy Frost - drums

== Discography ==
- Dangerous / Heaven 45 (RocketDog, Holland, lim. 1000 copies)
- Parts Unknown LP/CD (White Jazz, Sweden, 1999)
- Powerglide CD (Freakshow, Italy, 2001)
- Powerglide LP (Cargo, Germany)
- R.I.P. rnr on Ox fanzine compilation (Germany)
- Soulbone on Live at The Subsonic, Vol. 1 (Speed, France)
- R.I.P. rnr and "Do It Again" on Death Rattle and Roll (Wondertaker, USA)
- Live 10 (Pitshark , France, lim. 500 copies)
- The Earth Is Shaking (Suburban, NL, 2007)
