= Swedish death metal =

Music scene

Swedish death metal originated in the late 1980s and developed further in the 1990s. Many Swedish death metal bands are associated with the melodic death metal movement, thus giving Swedish death metal a different sound from other variations of death metal. Unlike American death metal groups, the first Swedish bands were rooted in hardcore punk. Gothenburg has a large melodic death metal scene while Stockholm is known for its more raw death metal scene.

Phil Freeman of AllMusic described Swedish death metal as "grinding," and as more focused on "getting heads banging and mosh pits exploding [and] less fixated on technical achievement" than the Floridan style of death metal.

== History ==
=== Precursors ===
The Swedish death metal scene's earliest originators were influenced more by punk rock, especially the D-beat and hardcore punk scene, than they were metal bands. The most influential of these bands upon the burgeoning Swedish extreme metal scene was Gothenburg's Anti Cimex. Influenced by such Swedish punk bands as Asocial, Mob 47 and Anti Cimex, emerged the country's first extreme metal band Bathory. Subsequently, becoming a primary influence for the black metal scene, Bathory were a pivotal group in Swedish extreme metal. Mefisto, Obscurity and Merciless were some of the earliest bands to follow in Bathory's footsteps, combining their sound with influences from German groups like Sodom and Destruction. Although Mefisto and Obscurity only released two demos each, and rarely performed live, Merciless became prominent in the extreme metal underground. Their live performances became notorious for bassist Fredrik Karlén's reckless behaviour, including climbing up buildings and jumping off of balconies. Furthermore, the band's 1988 demo Realm of the Dark, led to them becoming the first Swedish extreme metal band after Bathory to be signed to a record label, in this case of Euronymous's label Deathlike Silence Productions, who released Merciless's 1990 debut album The Awakening.

=== Origins ===
Stockholm's Morbid and Nihilist were two of the earliest Swedish death metal bands, who both began to record music at Sunlight Studio around 1987 and 1988. The distinctive "buzzsaw" guitar tone which would become emblematic of the scene was pioneered early on by Nihilist guitarist Leffe Cuzner. It was created by using detuned electric guitars (usually C standard or lower), a maxed out Boss HM-2 Heavy Metal pedal, sometimes in combination with a single guitar through a Boss DS-1 Distortion pedal. As these groups gained attention locally, additional groups joined the scene in subsequent years including Carnage, Dismember and Treblinka. During this time, many members of the Stockholm scene began congregating in Stockholm Metro stations, where they would listen to music and party. This group called themselves Bajsligan, meaning "Army of Excrement" or "the Shit League". Outside of the city, Grave from Visby formed, who soon began associating with the members of the Stockholm scene. By 1989, this first wave of bands was beginning to conclude: newer groups like Carbonized and Afflicted Convulsion began to gain prominence in the scene and the members of Nihilist, Morbid and Carnage would soon fragment, founding Entombed and Unleashed, and reforming Dismember.

Entombed released their debut album Left Hand Path in 1990, which not only marked them as the most prominent act in Swedish death metal, but also influenced countless bands, both locally and internationally. The same year also saw the release of Carnage's Dark Recollections and Tiamat's Sumerian Cry two other albums which signified beginning of Swedish death metal's second wave. The four groups who eventually solidified themselves as the most prominent bands of this era were Entombed, Grave, Dismember and Unleashed.

=== Gothenburg scene ===
The first death metal band to form in Gothenburg was Grotesque, who formed in 1988 and were influenced by both early death metal and black metal. After the 1990 disbandment of Grotesque, the band's vocalist Tomas Lindberg and guitarist Alf Svensson formed At the Gates alongside brothers Jonas and Anders Björler. Dark Tranquillity vocalist Mikael Stanne recalled the scene's origins: "The part of Gothenburg we’re all from is really tiny. There is basically one bus route that leads into the city. [...] I was at the first stop on the route, and that was where Tomas Lindberg from At The Gates lived as well. Then it would be [Dark Tranquillity guitarist] Niklas Sundin and Anders Fridén from In Flames. Then we’d meet up with the Björler twins and Anders and Peter Iwers – all on the same bus into the city. Then we’d sit in the park with a tape recorder and tons of beer, and that was it! The community and the friendships started there.". At the Gates' melancholic and melodic take on death metal proved immediately influential upon fellow Gothenburg bands, with Eucharist and Ceremonial Oath quickly adopting a similar style. Dissection and In Flames were also an early purveyors of this sound, additionally incorporating elements of black metal and folk music respectively. By 1993, Dark Tranquillity too began to incorporate more melodic elements influenced by At the Gates. Following the 1996 disbandment of At the Gates, critics dubbed this style the "Gothenburg sound", and At the Gates, Dark Tranquility and In Flames as the "Gothenburg big three", credited as pioneers of melodic death metal. AllMusic referred to this style as "a relatively accessible brand of progressive death metal."

=== Subsequent developments ===
Cemetary formed in Borås in 1989. The band's 1992 debut album An Evil Shade of Grey incorporating keyboards and elements of gothic metal and doom metal into its death metal foundation. The influence of Cemetary led the other groups to form in the city pursuing a similar take on the genre, notably Lake of Tears and Beseech.

Other groups to have emerged from the Swedish death metal scene include Scar Symmetry, Hypocrisy, Tiamat, Arch Enemy, Soilwork, Meshuggah, Amon Amarth, Edge of Sanity, Opeth, Desultory, Cemetary, Avatar and The Haunted.

Newer bands playing in the "old school" Swedish style include Bloodbath and Repugnant. According to Stewart Mason of AllMusic, the "increasingly melodic" style of Swedish death metal combines the post-hardcore aggression and guttural vocals of black metal with melodic and technically proficient guitar lines.

== Legacy and influence ==
The death metal scene in Sweden has influenced many bands and genres outside Sweden. Stewart Mason has noted this popularity in the United States, using the term "Swedecore" to describe Scandinavian-style metal as played by non-Nordic bands. The Stockholm sound has been known to be very influenced by the first Entombed album and bands such as Autopsy, Death and Repulsion. The Stockholm sound has less reception but is strictly followed by bands like Trap Them and Rotten Sound. Melodic death metal, on the other hand, has had a notable influence on the melodic metalcore sound of the 2000s, and the Gothenburg scene is also considered to be highly influential on modern heavy metal as a whole. Dom Lawson of Metal Hammer wrote, "Nearly three decades on, the Gothenburg sound has been fully assimilated into metal’s artistic vocabulary. In fact, it’s hard to imagine what modern metal would like without the efforts of those scruffy, beer-swilling teenagers from the Swedish suburbs."

== See also ==
- List of Swedish death metal bands
- Early Norwegian black metal scene
