= Same Difference (Entombed album) =

Studio album by Entombed
- Released: 16 November 1998
- Recorded: August 1998
- Studio: Polar Studios, Stockholm, Sweden
- Genre: Alternative metal; noise rock
- Length: 43:32
- Label: Music for Nations
- Producer: Daniel Rey

Entombed chronology
Entombed (1997)	Same Difference (1998)	Monkey Puss (Live in London) (1999)

Professional ratings
Review scores
Source	Rating
AllMusic	1.5/5 stars
Collector's Guide to Heavy Metal	7/10

Same Difference is the fifth studio album by Swedish metal band Entombed. It was released in 1998. This album shows the band moving into a more commercial sound and is generally considered the band's weakest moment both by fans and by the band's former vocalist, LG Petrov. This is the band's first album without original drummer and primary songwriter Nicke Andersson, who left Entombed to focus on his side project, The Hellacopters.

== Track listing ==
No.	Title	Writer(s)	Length
1.	"Addiction King"	Ulf Cederlund, Jorgen Sandström	2:56
2.	"The Supreme Good"	Cederlund, Alex Hellid	4:15
3.	"Clauses"	Cederlund, Sandström	3:38
4.	"Kick in the Head"	Cederlund	3:29
5.	"Same Difference"	Hellid	4:00
6.	"Close But Nowhere Near"	Cederlund, Hellid	2:56
7.	"What You Need"	Hellid, Peter Stjärnvind	2:49
8.	"High Waters"	Cederlund, Hellid	3:39
9.	"20-20 Vision"	Hellid	3:03
10.	"The Day, the Earth"	Sandström, Cederlund	2:45
11.	"Smart Aleck"	Cederlund, Stjärnvind	3:19
12.	"Jack Worm"	Cederlund	2:51
13.	"Wolf Tickets"	Cederlund, Hellid	3:52
Total length:			43:32

Limited edition bonus tracks
No.	Title	Writer(s)	Length
14.	"Vices by Proxy"	Cederlund	2:59
15.	"Dagger" (Japanese edition bonus track)	Cederlund	3:32

Brazilian edition bonus tracks
No.	Title	Writer(s)	Original artist	Length
14.	"Kick Out the Jams"	Tyner, Kramer, Smith, Davis, Thompson	MC5	2:49
15.	"21st Century Schizoid Man"	Fripp, McDonald, Lake, Giles, Sinfield	King Crimson	3:19
16.	"Bursting Out"	Bray, Dunn, Lant	Venom	3:43
17.	"Under the Sun"	Butler, Iommi, Osbourne, Ward	Black Sabbath	5:45
18.	"Vices by Proxy"	Cederlund, Orvar Säfström		2:59
19.	"Dagger"	Cederlund		3:32

== Personnel ==
Entombed

- Jörgen Sandström – bass
- LG Petrov – vocals
- Alex Hellid – guitars
- Ulf "Uffe" Cederlund – guitars
- Peter Stjärnvind – drums

Productions

- Daniel Rey – producer, engineering, mixing
- Stefan Boman – engineering
- Jon Marshall Smith – mixing
- Howie Weinberg – mastering
- Michael Williams – photography (front cover)
- Neil Rapi – photography
