= Unreal Estate (album) =

Live album by Entombed
- Released: February 2005
- Genre: Death 'n' roll, death metal
- Length: 38:35
- Label: Plastic Head

Entombed chronology
Inferno (2003)	Unreal Estate (2005)	Serpent Saints – The Ten Amendments (2007)

Professional ratings
Review scores
Source	Rating
AllMusic	4/5 stars
Blabbermouth.net	7.5/10 stars

Unreal Estate is the second live album by Swedish death metal band Entombed. Originally it was planned to be released on 20 October 2004, but printing problems pushed its release to February 2005.

== Track listing ==
No.	Title	Length
1.	"DCLXVI/Intermission"	3:58
2.	"Chief Rebel Angel"	3:35
3.	"Say It in Slugs"	4:08
4.	"It Is Later Than You Think"	2:56
5.	"Returning to Madness"	3:06
6.	"Mental Twin"	2:59
7.	"Night of the Vampire"	4:17
8.	"Unreal Estate"	0:59
9.	"In the Flesh"	4:04
10.	"Something Out of Nothing"	3:18
11.	"Left Hand Path (Outro)"	5:15
Total length:		38:35
