= Wolverine Blues =

Studio album by Entombed
- Released: 31 August 1993
- Genres: Death 'n' roll; groove metal
- Length: 35:10
- Labels: Earache; Columbia
- Producer: Tomas Skogsberg

Entombed chronology
Clandestine (1991)	Wolverine Blues (1993)	DCLXVI: To Ride, Shoot Straight and Speak the Truth (1997)

Alternative cover featuring Wolverine

Singles from Wolverine Blues
- 1. "Hollowman" Released: 1993 (EP); 2. "Wolverine Blues" Released: 1994; 3. "Out Of Hand" Released: 1994; 4. "Full Of Hell" Released: 1994

Professional ratings
Review scores
Source	Rating
AllMusic	4.5/5 stars
Collector's Guide to Heavy Metal	10/10
Encyclopedia of Popular Music	4/5 stars
Entertainment Weekly	B
Kerrang!	5/5 stars
Metal Hammer	3/5 stars
Rock Hard	8.5/10
Rolling Stone	3/5 stars

Wolverine Blues is the third studio album by Swedish death metal band Entombed, released on 31 August 1993 by Earache Records. It saw the return of vocalist LG Petrov, who had appeared on the band's debut album.

The album displays a completely different sound from previous releases, incorporating elements of hard rock and heavy metal while still retaining much of their traditional death metal roots, in a style that would later be known as death 'n' roll. The band also adopted a mid-tempo groove metal style for this release, similar to that of American band Pantera.

The title of the album (and titular song) were not inspired by the Marvel Comics character Wolverine, but rather by James Ellroy’s novel the Big Nowhere, which features a serial killer who identifies with the animal.

== Marvel character ==
One version of Wolverine Blues was released with Marvel Comics' character Wolverine on the cover, despite Entombed never wanting their album to be associated with the superhero. Earache Records, without the band's permission, had made a deal with Marvel in order to use Wolverine to promote the album to a more mainstream audience, with the music video for the title track prominently featuring illustrations of the character. This edition included a Wolverine mini-comic inside the CD booklet. The Marvel edition was also heavily edited, with the track "Out of Hand" being removed entirely. A limited number of early pressings of the album contained audio samples taken from films (most notably Flatliners and Hellraiser III) which were subsequently removed from later pressing due to record label fears of potential legal action over their unlicensed use.

== Reception ==
Wolverine Blues received mostly positive reviews. In 2005, the album was ranked number 494 in Rock Hard magazine's book The 500 Greatest Rock & Metal Albums of All Time. The guitar magazine Guitar World labelled it "1994's best death metal effort and quite possibly the finest death metal album of this decade."

== Track listing ==
No.	Title	Writer(s)	Length
1.	"Eyemaster"	Andersson, Hellid	3:21
2.	"Rotten Soil"	Andersson, Cederlund	3:27
3.	"Wolverine Blues"	Andersson, Cederlund, Hellid	2:16
4.	"Demon"	Cederlund, Hellid	3:22
5.	"Contempt"	Hellid	4:34
6.	"Full of Hell"	Hellid	3:24
7.	"Blood Song"	Cederlund, Rosenberg, Andersson, Hellid	3:25
8.	"Hollowman"	Andersson	4:29
9.	"Heavens Die"	Andersson, Hakansson	4:17
10.	"Out of Hand" (removed in Marvel edition)	Rosenberg, Hellid, Cederlund, Andersson	3:07
Total length:			35:10

Remastered version bonus track
No.	Title	Length
11.	"State of Emergency" (Stiff Little Fingers cover)	2:35

== Credits ==
- Lars-Göran Petrov – vocals
- Uffe Cederlund – guitar, tambourine
- Lars Rosenberg – bass
- Alex Hellid – guitar
- Nicke Andersson – drums, design, artwork
- Tomas Skogsberg – producer, engineer
- Z. Benny Rehn – photography
