= Left Hand Path (album) =

1990 debut studio album by Entombed

Studio album by Entombed
- Released: 4 June 1990 (Europe) 7 December 1990 (US)
- Recorded: December 1989
- Studios: Sunlight Studio (Stockholm, Sweden)
- Genre: Death metal
- Length: 39:16
- Labels: Earache, Combat (US)
- Producers: Tomas Skogsberg, Entombed

Entombed chronology
Left Hand Path (1990)	Clandestine (1991)

Left Hand Path is the debut studio album by Swedish death metal band Entombed. It was released in the UK by Earache Records on 4 June 1990 and in the United States by Combat Records on 7 December 1990.

It is now considered a landmark in the death metal genre, and is noted for having put Swedish death metal "on the map."

== Background ==
The album was recorded in less than a week in late 1989 at Sunlight Studio in Stockholm, Sweden. The tracks "Left Hand Path", "Drowned" and "Bitter Loss" were written days before the band entered the studio, and Entombed guitarist Uffe Cederlund retroactively laments the tracks as sounding unfinished and "really sloppy".

Entombed vocalist Lars-Göran Petrov recalls that some lyrics were changed in the studio, and that while tracking vocal takes, drummer Nicke Andersson would stand behind him with a lyric sheet and point at which lines to sing.

Uffe's guitar tracks were panned to the left and the right, while Hellid's guitar tracks were panned to the middle. The band did not have a permanent bassist at the time of the album's recording, so the two guitarists took turns tracking basslines "every second song". The specifics of which guitarist tracked bass on which song have been lost to history, but Cederlund believes he may have tracked bass on "Drowned" and "Revel in the Flesh". (However, according to the album's credits the bass duties were shared between guitarist Cederlund and drummer Nicke Andersson)

The title of the album refers to the left-hand path belief system. Guitarist Alex Hellid found the term in Anton LaVey's book The Satanic Bible, but Nicke Andersson (who was the "big boss" in the band) made the final decision that it would be the album's title.

The title track contains an interpolation of the theme from the 1979 horror film Phantasm at 3:54.

The album artwork was created by Dan Seagrave.

== Music and lyrics ==
The sound on Left Hand Path has been described as "monumental", combining the "extremity of Earache's stable of British grindcore" with the "elaborate songwriting structures" of the Florida death metal scene. According to author Natalie J. Purcell, the album also features "punk-like and groovy rhythms offset with deep, doom-like sections". The album has drawn stylistic comparisons to Napalm Death, Carcass, Death, Obituary, Morbid Angel and Godflesh. Metal Hammer said Entombed showed "a penchant for horror schlock and an underlying punkiness" on the album. Joe Matera of Decibel described the track “But Life Goes On” as an early example of "how death metal can indeed use rock structures and still be completely intense," and Chris Krovatin of Kerrang! said "the band’s use of catchy melodies with a gross, gravelly guitar tone showed the world how excitingly sweet death metal could be." Andy O'Connor of Spin said: "Left Hand Path thrusted Autopsy’s grime-ridden brutish credo into harsh light, revealing the burning skeleton within."

The album has been noted for defining the style of Swedish death metal by being the earliest known album to feature the heavily distorted, "down-tuned, saw-like guitar sound", also known as the "Sunlight sound", which would later become a staple for the regional scene thereafter. According to Joe Matera of Guitar World, it "sounded like a swarm of bees." The guitar tone was achieved using guitars tuned to B standard tuning through a Boss HM-2 Heavy Metal pedal with all the controls set to max. These guitars were panned to the left and right channels, while a third guitar using a Boss DS-1 distortion pedal was placed in the center channel along with the bass. Entombed guitarist Leif "Leffe" Cuzner (who had previously played guitar in Nihilist) has been credited as the "creator" of the Swedish death metal guitar tone. Cederlund remarked: "Everybody had that pedal, but Leffe was the guy who cranked everything to 10 first. That pedal is a really bad distortion pedal, but everybody had it because it was the cheap pedal to buy back then." Andersson elaborated "yeah, there's four knobs on it. One of them is all mids, and if you put that on 10, that's how you get that sound. If you just have the regular Boss distortional [pedal] (the orange one) there's only high and low [...] first we thought the sounds was his guitar or his speaker, but it was his pedal. When we found that out, Uffe started using one too. Then Dismember bought the same pedals." A Peavey Studio Pro 40 combo amplifier that was being used by the band was said to have played a "pivotal role," as well.

The album’s lyrical themes involve morbidity and existential dread. According to Chris Krovatin of Kerrang, “While Left Hand Path uses much of the same subject matter as the records of its American counterparts, [...] it moved away from the bloody mess of most of the era’s death metal, instead favoring a sense of grim decay.”

== Reception and legacy ==
Professional ratings
Review scores
Source	Rating
AllMusic	4.5/5 stars
Collector's Guide to Heavy Metal	3/10
Entertainment Weekly	C

According to Jason of AllMusic, Left Hand Path was an "accomplishment" in the death metal genre, and "foreshadowed the pivotal role that Scandinavia would soon play in the evolution of the then-burgeoning genre." Metal Hammer named the album one of the best metal albums of the 1990s, saying, “Left Hand Path remains one of the most gruesomely perfect pieces of Swedish death metal ever committed to tape. [...] Most importantly, the Swedish sluggers’ stellar debut showed the Yanks didn’t have the monopoly on white-hot death metal. Bands are still ripping it off 30 years on.”

Left Hand Path was ranked No. 82 on Rolling Stone's "100 Greatest Metal Albums of All Time".

In August 2005, Decibel inducted Left Hand Path into the Decibel Magazine Hall of Fame, naming it the first "proper" Swedish death metal album, with the "buzzsaw" guitar tone being crowned as the legendary "Entombed sound". It has been called "the pinnacle of Swedish death metal," and Invisible Oranges hailed the title track as "one of the greatest metal songs ever composed."

Metal Hammer named Left Hand Path the 9th best death metal album of all time, calling it "brutal and dark" and "full of genuinely great tunes", and said the band's songwriting was "sharper", "catchier" and "more memorable" than most other acts in the genre.

In 2021, Greg Pratt of Decibel wrote: "Entombed excelled on Left Hand Path in a lot of different ways: it's trailblazing, it has tons of atmosphere—even the raging parts take the listener places beyond just a total beatdown—and it has killer songwriting placed within an extreme metal framework. And some of these points Entombed really don't get enough credit for. For my money, the band ramped it all up a notch next time out on Clandestine, but for today’s purposes, Left Hand Path is as perfect a Swedish death metal album as there was in 1990." In 2023, Andy O'Connor of Spin included the album in his list of The 15 Best Swedish Metal Records. He wrote: "Entombed’s debut, Left Hand Path, may be the most copied Swedish metal record ever. When people refer to the 'buzzsaw' guitar sound, this is what they’re talking about. If you know it, you lust for it, and have likely tried to emulate it too. [...] Many bands in Sweden and abroad have taken from this album — few came close."

== Cover versions ==
Two songs from the album were covered by Belgian death metal band Aborted: "Drowned" for the re-release of The Archaic Abattoir and "Left Hand Path" for the EP Coronary Reconstruction.

== Track listing ==
All lyrics are written by Nicke Andersson, Alex Hellid; all music is composed by Andersson, Uffe Cederlund, Leif Cuzner.

No.	Title	Length
1.	"Left Hand Path"	6:41
2.	"Drowned"	4:04
3.	"Revel in Flesh"	3:45
4.	"When Life Has Ceased"	4:13
5.	"Supposed to Rot"	2:06
6.	"But Life Goes On"	3:02
7.	"Bitter Loss"	4:25
8.	"Morbid Devourment"	5:27
9.	"Abnormally Deceased"	3:01
10.	"The Truth Beyond"	3:28
Total length:		39:16

CD bonus tracks
No.	Title	Length
11.	"Carnal Leftovers"	3:00
12.	"Premature Autopsy"	4:26

== Personnel ==
Entombed

- Lars-Göran Petrov – vocals
- Uffe Cederlund – guitar, bass
- Alex Hellid – guitar
- Nicke Andersson – drums, bass

Technical personnel

- Tomas Skogsberg – production, engineering
- Dan Seagrave – cover art
- Micke Lundstrom – photography
- David Windmill – design
