= Orvar Säfström =

Swedish singer and television personality

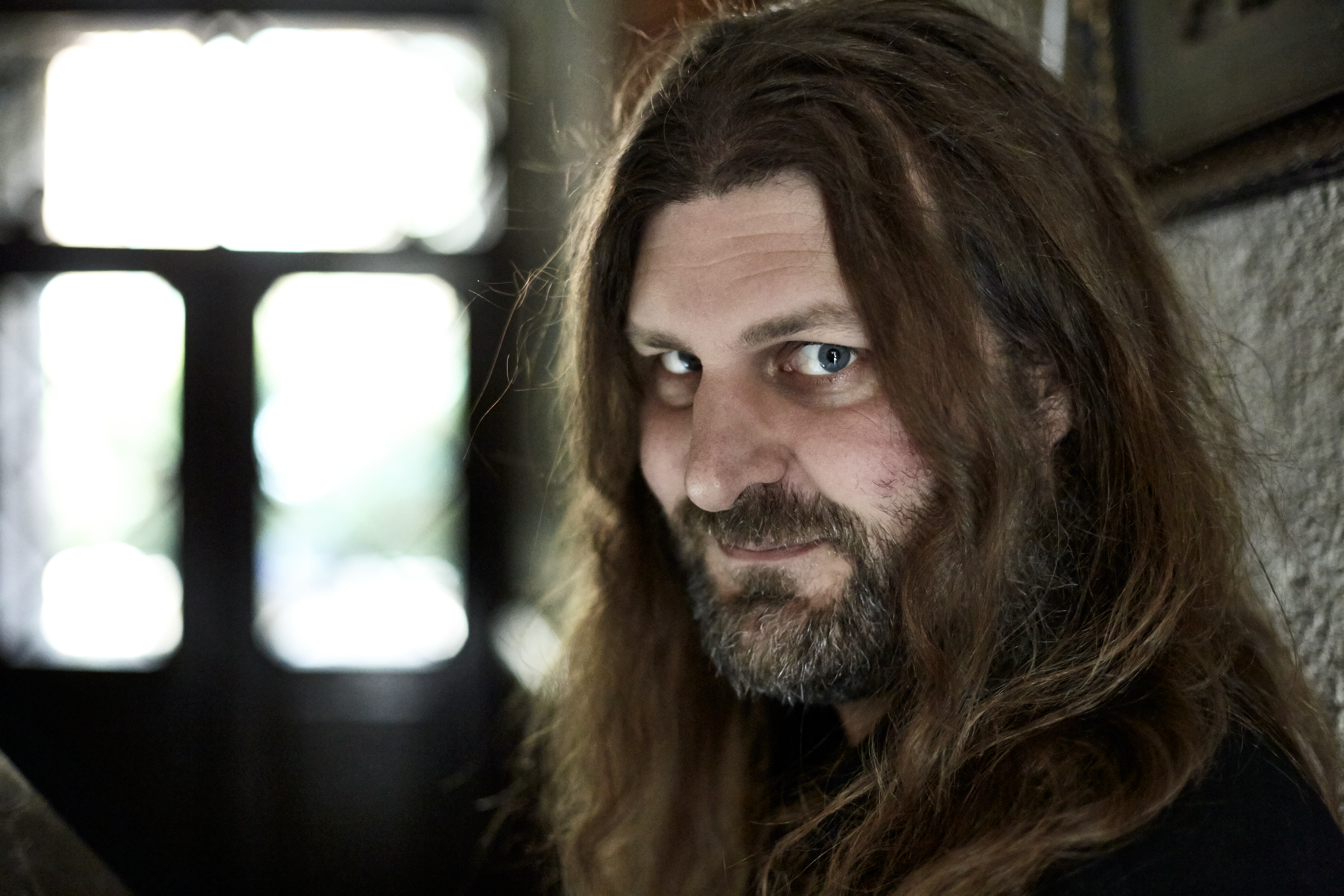
Säfström in 2014

Orvar Säfström (born 18 February 1974) is a Swedish musician and writer, and former film reviewer and video game journalist. He hosted Filmkrönikan on the Swedish television network SVT from 2003 to 2006. Before that, Säfström was employed at ZTV, where he hosted two other film review shows called Bio and Recensenten.

Starting in 2006, Säfström shifted his focus more towards video games, writing and lecturing on games. Among other things he talked in the Riksdag at a seminar on gaming and received the Sverok "Gamer of the year" award for outstanding work in promoting game culture.

In 2006, he also formed Underscore Productions to create symphonic concerts with game music and film music. Underscore works with major orchestras in Scandinavia such as the Royal Stockholm Philharmonic Orchestra and the Swedish Radio Symphony Orchestra, and have produced concert series like Score (game music), We Come in Peace (science fiction music), Sagas (fantasy music), and The Horror (horror music).

Säfström is a published writer, having written several books on the 1980s roleplaying game wave in Sweden and other related topics. In 2017, he formed the publishing house Fandrake with fellow writer Jimmy Wilhelmsson and publishes coffee table books dealing with fandom subjects, board games and retro/game related merchandise.

Säfström was part of the first wave of Swedish death metal in the late 1980's and early 1990's. He was the guitarist and vocalist of Nirvana 2002 and a session vocalist on Entombed's 1991 EP Crawl. He has also performed with the band in 2014, with the symphony orchestra live versions of the Entombed album Clandestine.
