= Nihilist (band) =

Swedish death metal band

- Origin: Stockholm, Sweden
- Genre: Death metal
- Years active: 1987–1989
- Spinoffs: Entombed, Unleashed
- Past members: Lars-Göran Petrov; Nicke Andersson; Leif "Leffe" Cuzner; Johnny Hedlund; Alex Hellid; Ulf Cederlund; Matthias "Buffla" Boström

Nihilist was a Swedish death metal band formed in 1987 by Nicke Andersson and Alex Hellid. The band split up in 1989 when Johnny Hedlund left to form Unleashed. The remaining members reformed the band as Entombed. Nihilist never recorded a full-length album before they renamed themselves, but a collection of their demo work was released in 2005. Guitarist Leif "Leffe" Cuzner died in June 2006.

Nicke Andersson admitted in the book about death metal and grindcore Choosing Death that after his relationship with Hedlund grew acrimonious, he deliberately split the band up to part company with him. The last lineup of Nihilist minus Hedlund reformed as Entombed, while Hedlund formed the band Unleashed.

== Band members ==
- Lars-Göran Petrov – vocals (1988–1989)
- Nicke Andersson – drums (1987–1989)
- Leif "Leffe" Cuzner – bass (1987–1988), guitar (1988–1989)
- Johnny Hedlund – bass (1988–1989)
- Alex Hellid – guitar (1987–1989)
- Ulf Cederlund – guitar (1989)
- Matthias "Buffla" Boström – vocals (1987–1988)

== Discography ==
- Premature Autopsy – demo (1988)
- Only Shreds Remain – demo (1989)
- Drowned – demo (1989)
- Drowned – 7" single (1989)
- Nihilist (1987–1989) – (2005)
