= Entombed (band) =

Swedish death metal band

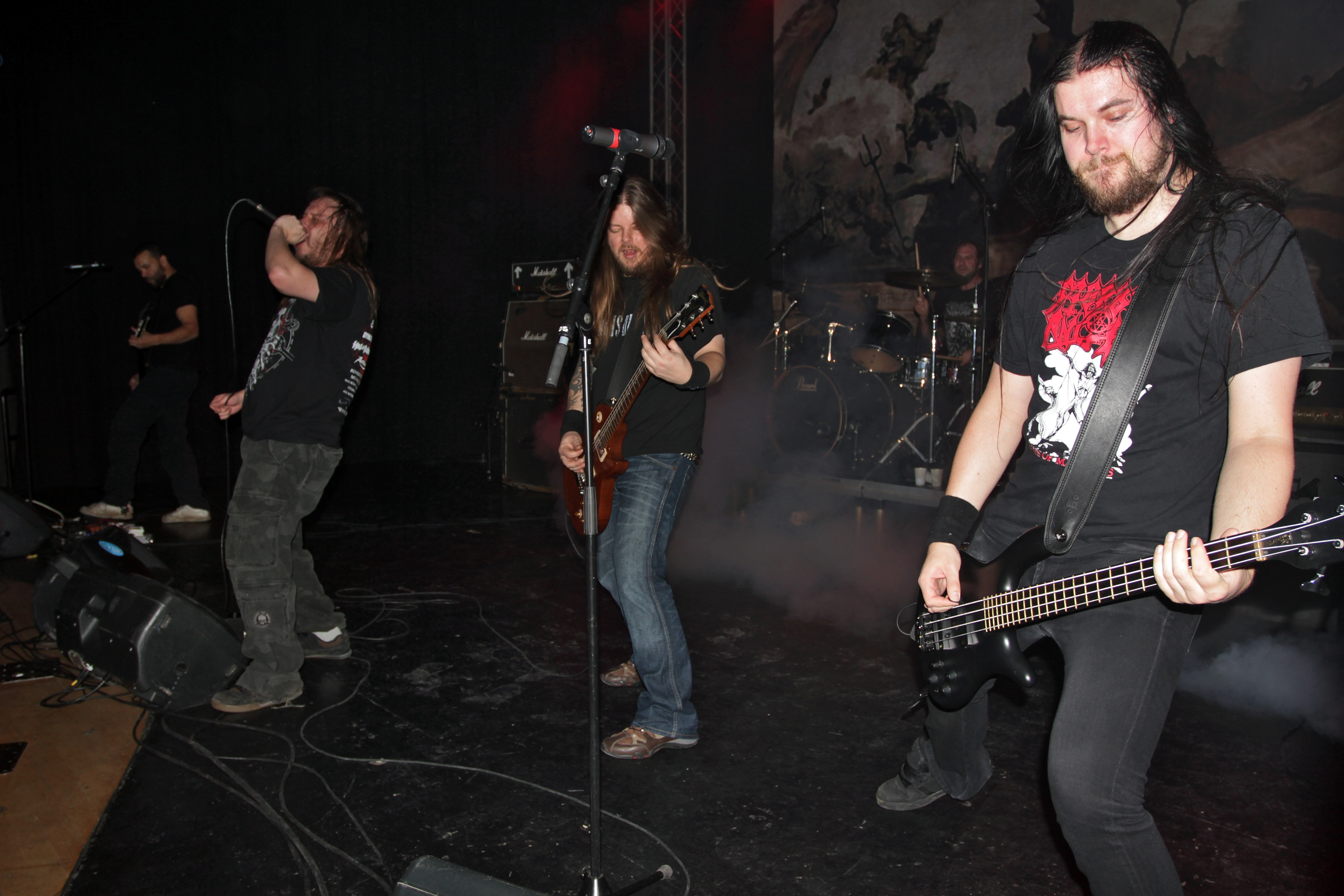
- Entombed performing in 2011

Background information
- Origin: Stockholm, Sweden
- Genres: Death metal; death 'n' roll
- Years active: 1987–2014, 2016–present
- Labels: Threeman; Candlelight; Music for Nations; Earache; Combat; Relativity; Columbia; Sony
- Spinoffs: Entombed A.D.
- Members: Alex Hellid; Nicke Andersson; Uffe Cederlund; Jörgen Sandström

Entombed is a Swedish death metal band formed in 1987 as Nihilist. Entombed began their career as an early pioneer of Scandinavian death metal, which differed from its American counterpart by its distinct "buzzsaw" guitar tone. Their sound evolved by the early-to-mid-1990s and the band began to explore progressive, punk, hard rock, garage rock, and groove metal influences, which shaped the sound of death 'n' roll. Along with Dismember, Grave and Unleashed, Entombed has been referred to as one of the "big four" of Swedish death metal.

== History ==
=== Early career (1987–1991) ===
Entombed are rooted in the band Nihilist, formed by drummer Nicke Andersson, guitarist Alex Hellid and bassist Leif Cuzner in 1987. After using a number of temporary vocalists for their initial shows, the band recruited L.G. Petrov, who was the drummer for the band Morbid, which featured Mayhem vocalist Dead. The band recruited Morbid's session guitarist Uffe Cederlund as a second guitarist, and recorded a number of demos with tracks that would appear on Entombed's debut album. Following tensions between band members, the majority of the band renamed themselves as Entombed rather than force these members out.

Entombed's debut album, Left Hand Path, was released in 1990, a cult favorite that established them as a popular Swedish death metal band. Left Hand Path and its follow-up, Clandestine, featured what was sometimes referred to as a "buzz saw" guitar sound. Prior to recording Clandestine, Petrov was fired due to personal disputes. The vocals on the album were recorded by Andersson instead, and for the tour following the album's release in 1991, the band hired vocalist Johnny Dordevic, previously of the band Carnage.

=== 1992–2000 ===
Petrov reconciled with the band after releasing an album with the band Comecon, and the band released Wolverine Blues in 1993. The album featured a departure from the band's previous work, with a greater influence of hard rock and heavy metal alongside their initial death metal style, a combination often referred to as death 'n' roll. Although the release was divisive amongst the band's fanbase, it established their mainstream and critical reputation. Wolverine Blues is considered a classic of early 1990s death metal.

1998's Same Difference was the band's first album without drummer and founding member Nicke Andersson, who left the band to concentrate on his new project, The Hellacopters. He was replaced with Peter Stjärnvind. In 2000, Entombed released Uprising, followed a year later by Morning Star.

=== 2001–2009 ===
In 2001, the band worked with performance artists Carina Reich and Bogdan Szyberb and the Royal Swedish Ballet. The production was entitled Unreal Estate.

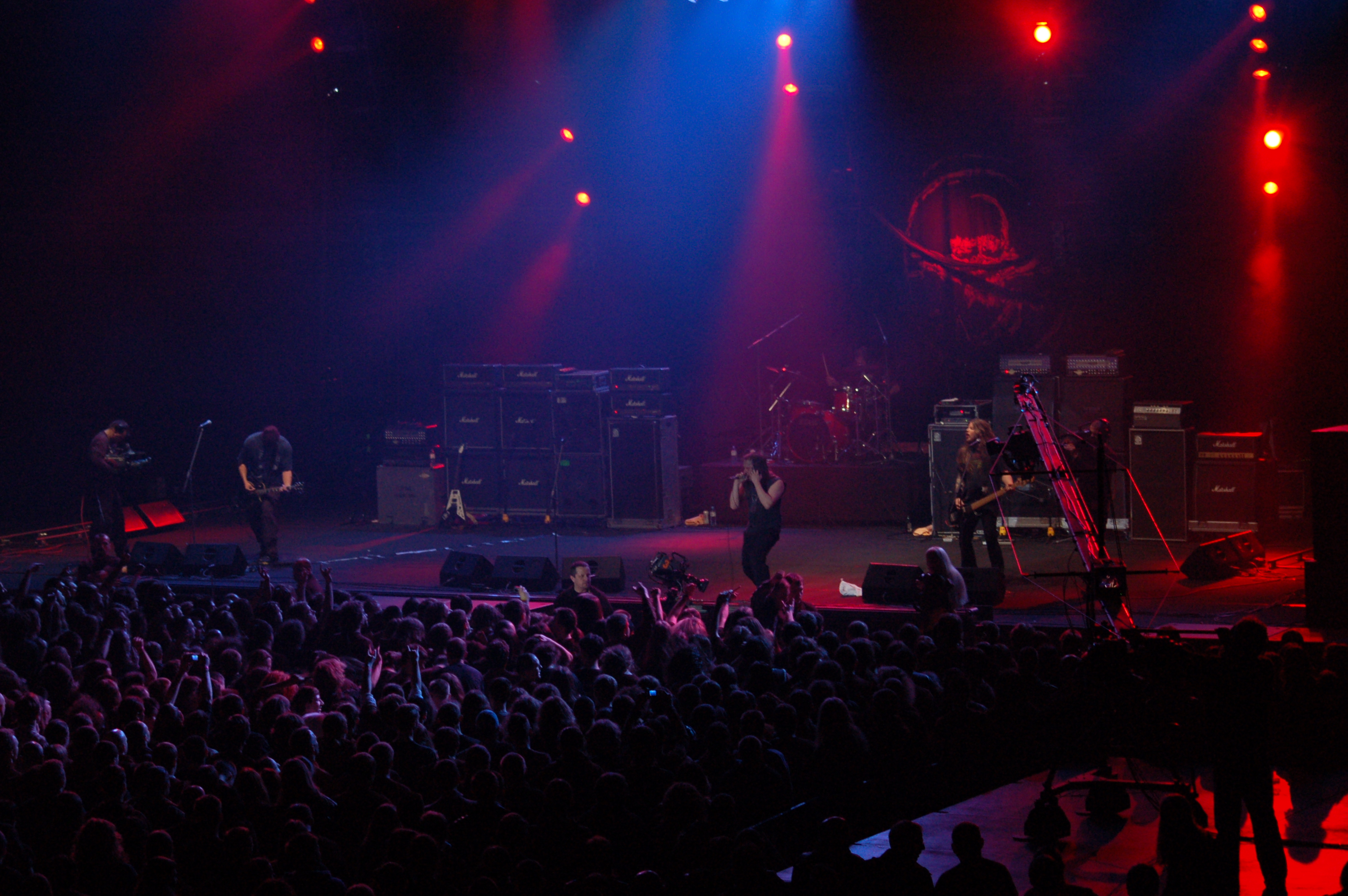
Entombed during Metalmania festival in Poland, 2007

Inferno, the last album with guitarist Uffe Cederlund (who joined Disfear), bassist Jörgen Sandström and drummer Peter Stjärnvind, was released in 2003.

Bassist Nico Elgstrand (who produced the album Uprising) joined in 2004. Olle Dahlstedt (of Alpha Safari and ex–Misery Loves Co.) replaced Stjärnvind in 2006. When Uffe Cederlund left in 2005, Alex Hellid remained the only guitarist.

Serpent Saints – The Ten Amendments was released on 9 July 2007. The album featured a greater influence from traditional death metal and was the band's first release with drummer Olle Dahlstedt and bassist Nico Elgstrand.

=== 2010–2020 ===
In 2010, bassist Victor Brandt joined and Nico Elgstrand switched to guitars. The band again had two guitarists.

In April 2013, Entombed performed a set with the Sundsvall Chamber Orchestra at the Nordfest festival.

In 2013, Petrov and Hellid began a legal battle regarding the name Entombed.

In 2014, L.G. Petrov, Olle Dahlstedt, Nico Elgstrand and Victor Brandt formed Entombed A.D. as a result of Hellid holding the band's trademark.

Hellid, Cederlund, and Säfström reunited to perform "Clandestine" in its entirety with the 65-piece Gävle Symphonic Orchestra and a 40-piece choir in February 2014. Thomas von Wachenfeldt played bass. Nicke Andersson intended to participate, but was prevented by scheduling conflicts.

Hellid, Andersson, and Cederlund reunited to perform as Entombed in October 2016. They were joined by Robert Andersson (vocals) and Nicke Andersson's half brother Edvin Aftonfalk (bass), both formerly of the Swedish death metal band Morbus Chron. Their first performance was at the Close-Up Båten festival cruise. In November, they performed a double set in Malmö to celebrate the 25th anniversary of Clandestine, where the album was performed in its entirety twice. The first set was a performance by Hellid, Cederlund, Andersson with Säfström and von Wachenfeldt and the Malmö Symphony Orchestra and the second set was a regular performance with Andersson and Aftonfalk.

=== 2021–present ===
On 7 March 2021, former vocalist Lars-Göran Petrov died from cholangiocarcinoma, aged 49.

On 14 July 2022, Entombed performed at Gefle Metal Festival. The band consisted of Alex Hellid, Nicke Andersson, Uffe Cederlund and Jörgen Sandström. Vocals were performed by Sandström and guest vocalists Tomas Lindberg, Scott Carlson, Johnny Hedlund, Urskogr, and Cronos. Former Entombed drummer Peter Stjärnvind was guest on drums.

On 1 March 2025, the members of Entombed announced that the band were "back in the studio – after all these years" working on new material for their first album in nearly two decades.

== Artistry ==
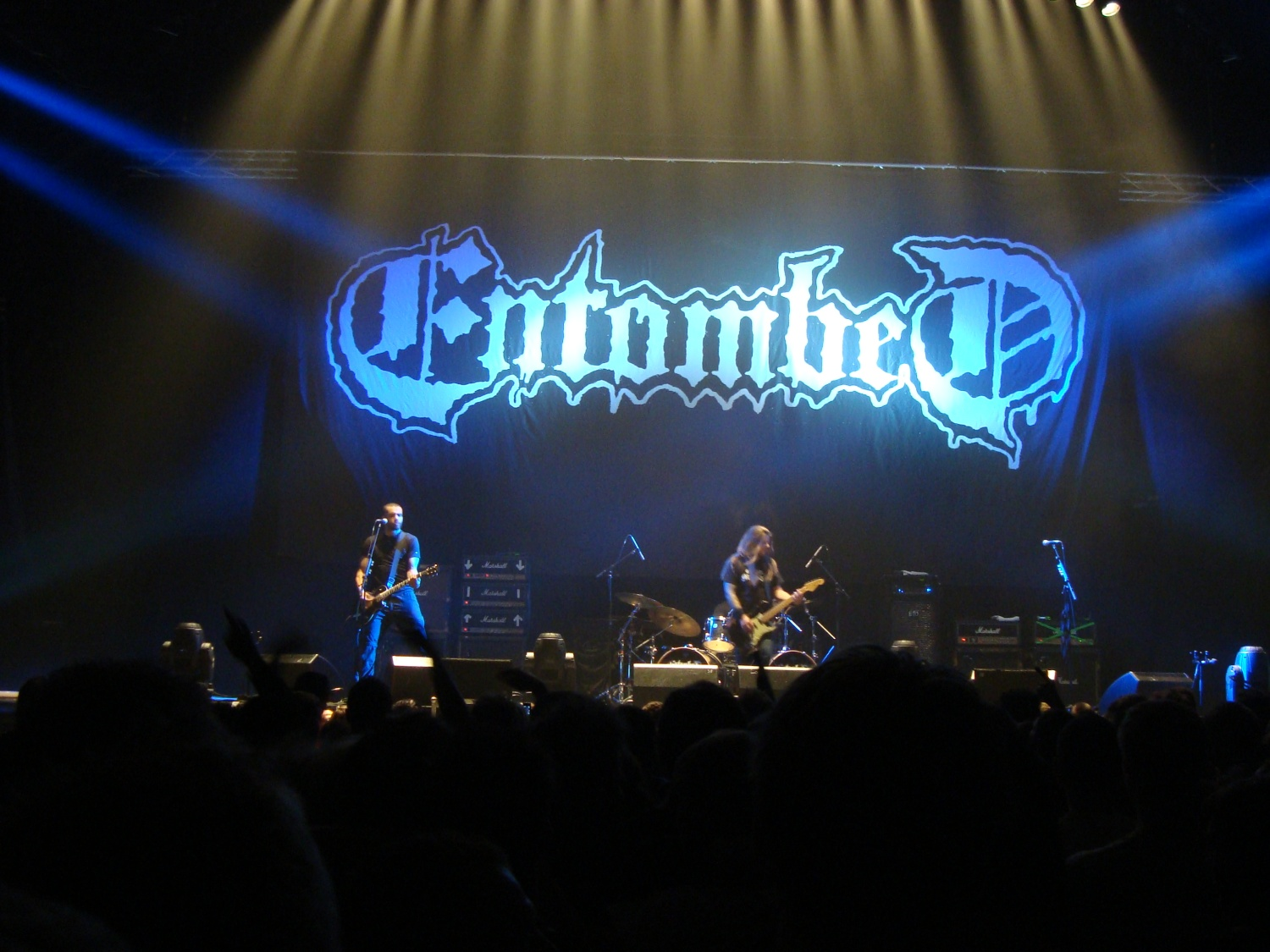
Entombed performing in 2010

=== Style and legacy ===
Music journalists have referred to Entombed as one of the "big four" of European death metal, along with Dismember, Grave, and Unleashed. The band became known for their "buzzsaw" guitar tone, which was achieved through the use of a Peavey amplifier and a Boss HM-2 distortion pedal. Entombed's influence has been observed in Black Breath, Nails, Early Graves, and Trap Them.

According to drummer Nicke Andersson: "We were at least amongst the first to pick up on that underground American scene with Death, Possessed, Repulsion and Autopsy. Prior to that we listened to any fast music, really, from Slayer to D.R.I., and bought albums by Kreator, Sodom, Testament. But when we got into this death metal underground we felt nothing could top that. If you were into heavy music, once you heard it, there was no turning back. We're talking weeks or months of evolution, everything happened quickly, but thrash metal was out the window for us. It seemed silly music, for wimps."

=== Influences ===
Entombed's main influences include bands such as Obituary, Napalm Death, GBH, Suicidal Tendencies, Discharge, Anti-Cimex, Atheist, Executioner, Dirty Rotten Imbeciles, Slayer, Celtic Frost, Repulsion, and Autopsy.

== Personnel ==
Current members

- Alex Hellid – guitar, backing vocals (1987–2014, 2016–present)
- Uffe Cederlund – guitar, organ, backing vocals (1987–2005, 2014, 2016–present), bass (1989–1990)
- Nicke Andersson – drums (1987–1997, 2016–present), lead vocals (1992), bass (1989–1990)

Former members

- Mattias Boström – lead vocals (1987–1988)
- Leif Cuzner – bass (1987–1988; died 2006)
- Johnny Hedlund – bass (1988–1989)
- Lars-Göran Petrov – lead vocals, piano (1988-1991, 1992–2014; died 2021)
- David Blomqvist – bass (1989)
- Lars Rosenberg – bass (1990–1995)
- Johnny Dordevic – lead vocals (1991–1992)
- Orvar Säfström – lead vocals (1991, 2014)
- Jörgen Sandström – bass, backing vocals (1995–2004, 2022), lead vocals (2022)
- Peter Stjärnvind – drums (1997–2006, guest 2022)
- Nico Elgstrand – bass (2004–2010), guitar (2010–2014), backing vocals
- Olle Dahlstedt – drums (2006–2014)
- Victor Brandt – bass (2010–2014)
- Edvin Aftonfalk - bass (2016–2022)
- Robert Andersson - lead vocals (2016–2022)

Session/guest musicians

- Fred Estby – vocals, drums
- Matti Kärki – vocals
- Peder Carlsson – harmonica
- Anders Lindström – rhythm guitar
- Colten Lavalle - drumtar
- Caméla Leierth – backing vocals
- Daniel Rey – spoken word on one song
- Östen Warnerbring – vocals and saxophone for one TV performance
- Thomas von Wachenfeldt – Bass and orchestral arrangements on the Classical Clandestine symphonic concerts
- Tomas Lindberg – vocals
- Scott Carlson – vocals
- Cronos – vocals, bass

== Discography ==
Studio albums

- Left Hand Path (1990)
- Clandestine (1991)
- Wolverine Blues (1993)
- DCLXVI: To Ride, Shoot Straight and Speak the Truth (1997)
- Same Difference (1998)
- Uprising (2000)
- Morning Star (2001)
- Inferno (2003)
- Serpent Saints: The Ten Amendments (2007)

== Bibliography ==
- Ekeroth, Daniel (2008). Swedish Death Metal. Bazillion Points Books. ISBN 978-0-9796163-1-0.
