= Death 'n' roll =

Fusion genre of death metal and rock 'n' roll

- Stylistic origins: Death metal; rock and roll; hard rock; heavy metal
- Cultural origins: Early to mid–1990s, Finland, Sweden, England

Other topics
- Black 'n' roll; melodic death metal

Death 'n' roll (portmanteau of death metal and rock 'n' roll) is a subgenre of death metal music that incorporates hard rock-inspired elements. The achieved effect is that of death metal's trademark combination of growled vocals and highly distorted detuned guitar riffing with elements reminiscent of 1970s hard rock and heavy metal. Notable examples include Entombed, Gorefest, Carcass, Xysma, Convulse, Six Feet Under, Pungent Stench and the Fernando Colunga Ultimate Experience.

== History ==
While the "death 'n' roll" tag was first associated with Swedish death metal band Entombed, Daniel Ekeroth associates the style with a previous group called Furbowl. After Entombed released Wolverine Blues, the band became associated with what the music press dubbed as "death 'n' roll", a label which has followed Entombed's career ever since. In the years following the album's release, the sound was embraced by Dismember on Massive Killing Capacity (1995), Carcass on Swansong (1996) and Six Feet Under on Warpath (1997).

Similar to Entombed, Dutch band Gorefest also transitioned from its origins in death metal to incorporate a death 'n' roll style. Elements of this approach were first evident on the band's 1994 album Erase, but it was more fully realized on the subsequent release, Soul Survivor (1996), which also demonstrated significant influence from classic rock. Proof of that influence was the club tour organized by the band that same year, where Gorefest played songs by AC/DC, Black Sabbath and Deep Purple. Gorefest broke up after their last 1990s album, Chapter 13, which continued the trend started in Soul Survivor, and Gorefest reformed seven years later. Two of its members currently play in Live & Dangerous, a Thin Lizzy tribute band from the Netherlands.

When confronted with the "death 'n' roll" label in interviews, the acts that the label is attached to react with skepticism. Entombed's LG Petrov stated "We see it as Entombed music, if people see that as death 'n' roll so be it. We just laugh, death 'n' roll, why not? When we write songs, we aren't thinking it has to be a particular style." When questioned about their mixture of death metal and rock and roll, Gorefest's Frank Harthoorn replied: "Strange, everyone has always mentioned this death n' roll thing. To me it's just metal, plain and simple. I don't believe our influences are different from other bands."
