= Sunlight Studio =

Recording studio in Stockholm, Sweden

Sunlight Studios is a recording studio in Stockholm, Sweden, run by Tomas Skogsberg. It has been a popular choice for Swedish death metal bands such as Dismember, At The Gates, Entombed, Grave, Katatonia and Tiamat.

== Records ==
=== 1989 ===
- Treblinka – Severe Abominations
- Therion – Time Shall Tell
- Nihilist – Only Shreds Remain

=== 1990 ===
- Carnage – Dark Recollections
- Entombed – Left Hand Path
- Tiamat – Sumerian Cry
- Grotesque – Incantation
- Carbonized – No Canonization

=== 1991 ===
- Darkthrone – Soulside Journey
- Dismember – Like an Ever Flowing Stream
- Entombed – Clandestine
- Grave – Into the Grave
- Therion – Of Darkness...
- Merciless – The Treasures Within
- Sorcery – Bloodchilling Tales
- Xysma – Yeah

=== 1992 ===
- Amorphis – The Karelian Isthmus
- Obscure Infinity – Beyond the Gate
- Afflicted – Prodigal Sun
- Cemetary – An Evil Shade of Grey
- Vader – The Ultimate Incantation First Recording Session
- Convulse – Reflections
- Centinex – Subconscious Lobotomy

=== 1993 ===
- Dismember – Indecent & Obscene
- Entombed – Wolverine Blues
- Desultory – Into Eternity
- Necrophobic – The Nocturnal Silence
- At The Gates – With Fear I Kiss the Burning Darkness
- Utumno – Across The Horizon
- Internal Decay – A Forgotten Dream

=== 1994 ===
- Amorphis – Tales from the Thousand Lakes
- Desultory – Bitterness

=== 1995 ===
- Dismember – Massive Killing Capacity
- Amorphis – Black Winter Day
- Loud Pipes – Drunk Forever

=== 1996 ===
- Amorphis – Elegy

=== 1997 ===
- Dismember – Death Metal
- Entombed – DCLXVI: To Ride, Shoot Straight and Speak the Truth
- Vibrion – Closed Frontiers

=== 1998 ===
- Katatonia – Discouraged Ones

=== 1999 ===
- Katatonia – Tonight's Decision

=== 2001 ===
- Katatonia – Last Fair Deal Gone Down

=== 2013 ===
- Jesus Chrüsler Supercar – Among The Ruins And Desolate Lands

=== 2018 ===
- Befouled – Refuse to Rot

=== 2022 ===
- Xorsist – Deadly Possession
