= Structures of Death =

Studio album by Fleshcrawl
- Released: 21 September 2007
- Recorded: 27 April – 13 May 2007 at Studio Toninfusion, Ulm, Germany
- Genre: Death metal
- Length: 41:22
- Language: English
- Label: Metal Blade
- Producer: Fleshcrawl

Fleshcrawl chronology
| Made of Flesh (2004) | Structures of Death (2007) |

Professional ratings
Review scores
| Source | Rating |
|---|---|
| Metal Storm | link |

Structures of Death is the eighth studio album by the German death metal band Fleshcrawl. It was released on 21 September 2007 in Germany, Austria, Italy, and the Czech Republic, then released in the rest of Europe on 24 September 2007. It is the band's only album to feature bassist Nico Scheffler and was their first album not recorded in Sweden.

== Background ==
Keeping consistent with their recent work (since As Blood Rains from the Sky...), the band's unique sound is created through an amalgamation of melodic guitar rhythmics built upon a foundation of very heavy, very familiar, highly brutal drumwork and vocals. Like other melodic death metal bands, such as Grave, Arch Enemy and (early) Entombed, Fleshcrawl's guitar work for this album is laden with Swedish death metal-style distortion, especially in the riffing, which remains comparable to their earlier releases in that it utilizes mid-to-high range tones and moderate-to-rapid tempos, accented by occasional, moderately-technical guitar solos, which tend to be somewhat longer and more rhythmic than those in their earlier work. Diverging from other contemporary melodic death metal releases, the overall intensity of the album is well enhanced by the use of brutal/technical death metal-style blast beats incorporated into highly prominent, yet not obtrusive, very rapid double bass drum on the order of such bands as Kataklysm and Krisiun along with somewhat guttural, abrasive vocals, somewhat reminiscent of such bands as Six Feet Under and Cannibal Corpse.

Like other Fleshcrawl albums and death metal as a whole, the lyrical themes cover such gory, death metal-esque subjects as insanity ("Structures of Death", "Written in Blood"), evisceration ("Into the Crypts of Scattered Souls", "Nothing but Flesh Remains"), the Grim Reaper/Harvester of Souls ("Anthem of Death"), demons/demonic possession ("Rest in Pain", "A Spirit Dressed in Black"), mortality ("About Mortality"), and doomsday/the apocalypse ("War of the Dead"). However, unlike any of their earlier releases, this album includes several references to their earlier work. Track 4, "Written in Blood", includes the lines, "Forever more the soulskinner is back", referencing to the band's sixth studio album, Soulskinner, and track 6, "Fleshcult", which describes the mindset of death metal and the experience of the band through their 20-year history through a collection of synecdochal allusions to their previous work, including:

- "From the Dead to the Living" and "Center of Hate" from Impurity
- "Bloodsoul" from Bloodsoul
- "The Messenger" and "Beyond Belief" from Bloodred Massacre
- "Feed the Demon's Heart" from As Blood Rains from the Sky...
- "Soulskinner", "Breeding the Dead", "Legions of Hatred", and "Forced to Kill" from Soulskinner
- "Forged in Blood" and "Damned in Fire" from Made of Flesh

== Track listing ==
1. "Skulls of the Rotten (Intro)" – 1:21
2. "Structures of Death" – 2:48
3. "Into the Fire of Hell" – 3:51
4. "Written in Blood" – 3:03
5. "A Spirit Dressed in Black" – 4:03
6. "Fleshcult" – 3:00
7. "Into the Crypts of Scattered Souls" – 2:48
8. "Anthem of Death" – 4:58
9. "Nothing but Flesh Remains" – 3:37
10. "Rest in Pain (R.I.P.)" – 3:20
11. "About Mortality" – 2:58
12. "War of the Dead" – 5:35
13. "Rockin' Is My Business" (only included in the digipak release)

== Personnel ==
- Sven Gross – vocals
- Nico Scheffler – bass
- Oliver Grbavac – guitar, acoustic guitar on "Into the Fire of Hell"
- Mike Hanus – guitar
- Bastian Herzog – drums

=== Production ===
- Recorded at Studio Toninfusion, Ulm, Germany, 27 April – 13 May 2007.
- Engineered by Martin Schmitt, assisted by Chris Gajny.
- Mixed and mastered at Studio Underground, Västeras, Sweden, 4–7 June 2007.
- Mixed by Pelle Saether & Fleshcrawl.
- Mastered by Pelle Saether.
- Music and lyrics by Fleshcrawl except "Rockin' Is My Business" by The Four Horsemen (Starr/Lizmi/Montgomery) and "Structures of Death" lyrics by Bastian Herzog and Harold Thompson. "Rockin' Is My Business" recorded at Studio Underground, Västeras, Sweden, November 2003. Mixed by Pelle Saether & Fleshcrawl.
- Photos by Rainer Ruber.
- Cover artwork, graphics, layout by Uwe Jarling.
