= Dark Recollections =

Studio album by Carnage
- Released: November 26, 1990
- Recorded: February 1990
- Studios: Sunlight Studio, Stockholm
- Genre: Death metal
- Length: 38:10
- Label: Earache
- Producers: Tomas Skogsberg, Carnage

Professional ratings
Review scores
Source	Rating
AllMusic	3/5 stars

Dark Recollections is the only studio album by Swedish death metal band Carnage, released in 1990 by Earache Records. It was originally released as a split CD with Cadaver's debut album Hallucinating Anxiety by Earache Records sublabel Necrosis. Some of the songs were later re-recorded by Dismember. Dark Recollections is the only album released by Carnage; the band had broken up by the time the album hit the streets. It was later reissued by Earache Records with eight additional tracks, taken from the demos for The Day Man Lost and Infestation of Evil.

"Deranged From Blood", "Death Evocation", "Blasphemies Of The Flesh" and "Self Dissection" previously appeared on Dismember demos circa 1988–1989, before Fred Estby and David Blomqvist joined Carnage. Dismember also officially recorded "Death Evocation" (a bonus track on reissues of Like an Ever Flowing Stream) and "Torn Apart" (on the Pieces EP).

== Track listing ==
- All songs written by Carnage.

No.	Title	Length
1.	"Dark Recollections"	3:45
2.	"Torn Apart"	4:46
3.	"Blasphemies of the Flesh"	3:46
4.	"Infestation of Evil"	4:37
5.	"Gentle Exhuming"	2:55
6.	"Deranged from Blood"	5:00
7.	"Malignant Epitaph"	3:18
8.	"Self Dissection"	3:30
9.	"Death Evocation"	4:30
10.	"Outro"	1:40
Total length:		38:10

Reissue bonus tracks
No.	Title	Length
1.	"Crime against Humanity" (The Day Man Lost (Demo '89)	1:52
2.	"Aftermath" (The Day Man Lost (Demo '89)	1:24
3.	"The Day Man Lost" (The Day Man Lost (Demo '89)	1:23
4.	"Crime against Humanity" (The Day Man Lost (rough mix)	1:51
5.	"Aftermath" (The Day Man Lost (rough mix)	1:26
6.	"The Day Man Lost" (The Day Man Lost (rough mix)	1:24
7.	"Torn Apart" (Infestation of Evil (Demo '89)	4:47
8.	"Infestation of Evil" (Infestation of Evil (Demo '89)	4:56
Total length:		58:13

== Personnel ==
=== Original release ===
- Matti Kärki – vocals
- Michael Amott – guitar, bass (on original version of the album)
- David Blomqvist – guitar
- Johnny Dordevic – bass (credited but did not play on the album)
- Fred Estby – drums (also on bonus tracks 17 and 18)

=== Bonus tracks ===
- Johan Axelsson: Vocals (tracks 11–18), bass (tracks 11–16)
- Fred Blomkvist: Guitars
- Michael Amott: Guitars
- Johnny Dordevic: Bass (on tracks 17–18)
- Jeppe Larsen: Drums (on tracks 11–16)

=== Production ===
- Produced by Carnage and Tomas Skogsberg
- Recording and Mix Engineer: Tomas Skogsberg
- Dan Seagrave – Cover artwork
