= Dismember (disambiguation) =

Dismember or Dismemberment may refer to:

- Dismemberment, removing the limbs of a human or animal
- Gross dismemberment, fatal emergency medical field assessment
- Dismemberment (illusion), a stage illusion
- Dismember (band), Swedish death metal band formed in 1988
  - Dismember (album), 2008
- "Dismembered", a song by KUKL from their 1984 album The Eye
- "Dismember", a song by Spoon from their 1996 album Telephono
- "Dismembered", a song by Jerry Cantrell from his 2021 album Brighten
- Dismembered, a 2003 film starring Dennis Haskins
