= Ravenous, Murderous =

Studio album by Murder Squad
- Released: 2003
- Recorded: 2002 at Dog Pound Audio Studio, Stockholm, Sweden
- Genre: Death metal
- Length: 40:34
- Label: Threeman

Murder Squad chronology
Unsane, Insane and Mentally Deranged (2001)	Ravenous, Murderous (2003)

Professional ratings
Review scores
Source	Rating
Desibeli.net	1/5
Expressen	3/5
Soundi	4/5
Svenska Dagbladet	5/6

Ravenous, Murderous is the second album by the band Murder Squad. It was released by Threeman Recordings in 2003.

== Critical reception ==
Expressen said the album is not as crushing as its predecessor. Soundi described the album as atmospheric, primitive and dirty death metal. Svenska Dagbladet said the album sounds like something from death metal's early history. Desibeli.net called the album a big disappointment.

== Track listing ==
No.	Title	Length
1.	"Ravenous Murderous"	3:59
2.	"I Am Eternal"	3:53
3.	"Epidermal Massacre"	2:04
4.	"Disturbing the Freaks"	5:01
5.	"Spunkslut"	2:23
6.	"Hellish Blasphemy"	3:27
7.	"Shitstorm"	3:43
8.	"Born in Sewage, Bred in Bile"	3:07
9.	"Army of Maggots"	4:00
10.	"Masterpiece of Morbidity"	1:40
11.	"Homicide"	1:48
12.	"Rising from the Ashes"	5:28
Total length:		40:34

== Credits ==
- Matti Kärki - Vocals
- Richard Cabeza - Bass
- Uffe Cederlund - Guitars
- Peter Stjärnvind - Drums
- Chris Reifert - Guest Vocals, Additional Guitars, Drums
- T. Ketola - Cover Art

== Charts ==
Chart performance for Unsane, Insane and Mentally Deranged
Chart (2026)	Peak position
Swedish Hard Rock Albums (Sverigetopplistan)	16
Swedish Physical Albums (Sverigetopplistan)	8
