= The God That Never Was =

Studio album by Dismember
- Released: 20 February 2006
- Recorded: Aug/Sep 2005 at Sami Studios
- Genre: Death metal
- Length: 35:35
- Label: Regain
- Producer: Fred Estby

Dismember chronology
Where Ironcrosses Grow (2004)	The God That Never Was (2006)	Dismember (2008)

Professional ratings
Review scores
Source	Rating
About.com	4.5/5 stars
AllMusic	3.5/5 stars
Blabbermouth	8/10 stars
Metal.de	8/10 stars
Rock Hard	8.5/10 stars
Noise.fi	3/5 stars
Powermetal.de	

The God That Never Was is the seventh studio album by Swedish death metal band Dismember. A music video was made for the track "Trail of the Dead".

== Track listing ==
No.	Title	Length
1.	"The God That Never Was"	2:09
2.	"Shadows of the Mutilated"	3:26
3.	"Time Heals Nothing"	3:40
4.	"Autopsy"	3:39
5.	"Never Forget, Never Forgive"	1:44
6.	"Trail of the Dead"	3:13
7.	"Phantoms (Of the Oath)"	3:55
8.	"Into the Temple of Humiliation"	4:08
9.	"Blood for Paradise"	2:19
10.	"Feel the Darkness"	3:39
11.	"Where No Ghost Is Holy"	3:39
Total length:		35:35

== Personnel ==
Dismember

- Fred Estby – drums, producer, engineering, mixing
- David Blomqvist – guitar, bass
- Martin Persson – guitar, bass
- Matti Kärki – vocals

Production

- Peter in de Betou – mastering
- Dan Seagrave – cover artwork
- Janne Wibeck – assistant engineering
- Carl-André Beckston – layout
- Shelley Jambresic – photography
- Peter Wendin – sound effects

== Charts ==
2023 chart performance for The God That Never Was
Chart (2023)	Peak position
German Albums (Offizielle Top 100)	86
