= Death Metal (Dismember album) =

Studio album by Dismember
- Released: 8 August 1997
- Recorded: October–December 1996
- Studio: Sunlight Studios
- Genre: Death metal, melodic death metal
- Length: 40:11
- Label: Nuclear Blast
- Producer: Tomas Skogsberg

Dismember chronology
Massive Killing Capacity (1995)	Death Metal (1997)	Hate Campaign (2000)

Professional ratings
Review scores
Source	Rating
AllMusic	3/5 stars
Rock Hard	8/10 stars
Metal.de	8/10 stars
Powermetal.de	

Death Metal is the fourth album by Swedish death metal band Dismember. It was released on 8 August 1997. The fourth track, "Let The Napalm Rain", opens with a sample from the movie Apocalypse Now.

== Track listing ==
No.	Title	Music	Length
1.	"Of Fire"	David Blomqvist, Richard Cabeza, Matti Karki	3:41
2.	"Trendkiller"	Fred Estby	2:11
3.	"Misanthropic"	Cabeza, Estby, Karki	2:59
4.	"Let the Napalm Rain"	Estby, Karki	3:27
5.	"Live for the Fear (Of Pain)"	Blomqvist, Estby, Robert Senneback	2:36
6.	"Stillborn Ways"	Estby	4:15
7.	"Killing Compassion"	Estby, Senneback	1:49
8.	"Bred for War"	Blomqvist, Estby, Karki	4:19
9.	"When Hatred Killed the Light"	Cabeza, Estby, Karki	3:31
10.	"Ceremonial Comedy"	Blomqvist, Estby, Karki	3:25
11.	"Silent Are the Watchers"	Blomqvist, Cabeza, Karki	3:54
12.	"Mistweaver"	Blomqvist, Estby, Karki	4:07

Reissue bonus tracks
No.	Title	Length
13.	"Pagan Saviour" (Autopsy cover)	3:54
14.	"Shadowlands"	3:31
15.	"Afterimage"	4:31
16.	"Shapeshifter"	4:40

== Personnel ==
Dismember

- Matti Kärki – vocals
- David Blomqvist – lead guitar
- Robert Sennebäck – rhythm guitar
- Richard Cabeza – bass
- Fred Estby – drums, producer, engineer

Production

- Dismember – producer
- Peter in de Betou – mastering
- Anders Lindström – engineer
- Tomas Skogsberg – engineer
- Alvaro Tapia – art direction
