= Hate Campaign =

Studio album by Dismember
- Released: 17 January 2000
- Recorded: Das Boot Studios, Stockholm, April - May 1999
- Genre: Death metal
- Length: 33:34
- Label: Nuclear Blast
- Producer: Fred Estby

Dismember chronology
Death Metal (1998)	Hate Campaign (2000)	Where Ironcrosses Grow (2004)

Professional ratings
Review scores
Source	Rating
AllMusic	3/5 stars
Kerrang!	4/5 stars
Rock Hard	8.5/10 stars
Metal.de	8/10 stars
Powermetal.de	

Hate Campaign is the fifth studio album by Dismember.

== Track listing ==
No.	Title	Length
1.	"Suicidal Revelations"	2:52
2.	"Questionable Ethics"	2:07
3.	"Beyond Good & Evil"	2:50
4.	"Retaliate"	2:47
5.	"Enslaved to Bitterness"	2:46
6.	"Mutual Animosity"	2:15
7.	"Patrol 17"	3:45
8.	"Thanatology"	2:35
9.	"Bleeding Over"	3:07
10.	"In Death's Cold Embrace"	3:03
11.	"Hate Campaign"	5:25
Total length:		33:34

== Personnel ==
- Fred Estby - Drums
- Matti Kärki - Vocals
- David Blomqvist - Guitars
- Sharlee D'Angelo - Bass
- Magnus Sahlgren - Guitar
