= Massive Killing Capacity =

Studio album by Dismember
- Released: 4 August 1995
- Recorded: 1994–95
- Studio: Sunlight Studios
- Genre: Death metal, death 'n' roll
- Length: 37:52
- Label: Nuclear Blast
- Producer: Tomas Skogsberg, Marcus Staiger

Dismember chronology
Indecent & Obscene (1993)	Massive Killing Capacity (1995)	Death Metal (1997)

Professional ratings
Review scores
Source	Rating
AllMusic	4/5 stars
Rock Hard	8.5/10 stars
Metal.de	8.5/10 stars
Powermetal.de	

Massive Killing Capacity is the third album by Dismember. It was re-released by Regain Records in 2005. A music video was made for the track "Casket Garden".

== Track listing ==
No.	Title	Writer(s)	Length
1.	"I Saw Them Die"	Matti Karki, Fred Estby	2:48
2.	"Massive Killing Capacity"	Karki, Estby, Richard Cabeza	2:53
3.	"On Frozen Fields"	Cabeza, David Blomqvist, Karki	2:35
4.	"Crime Divine"	Estby, Cabeza	2:58
5.	"To the Bone"	Karki, Estby, Cabeza	3:12
6.	"Wardead"	Estby	2:26
7.	"Hallucigenia"	Cabeza	4:06
8.	"Collection by Blood"	Karki, Robert Senneback	3:40
9.	"Casket Garden"	Cabeza, Estby, Senneback	3:35
10.	"Nenia"	Blomqvist, Senneback	4:38
11.	"Life – Another Shape of Sorrow"	Blomqvist	4:52
Total length:			37:52

Re-issue bonus tracks
No.	Title	Length
12.	"Justifiable Homicide"	3:17
13.	"Collection of Blood" (Demo)	3:42
14.	"Life – Another Shape of Sorrow" (Demo)	4:57
15.	"On Frozen Fields/Shadowslands" (Demo)	4:33

== Personnel ==
- Matti Kärki – vocals
- Fred Estby – drums
- David Blomqvist – lead guitar
- Richard Cabeza – bass
- Robert Sennebäck – guitar

== Charts ==
2023 chart performance for Massive Killing Capacity
Chart (2023)	Peak position
Polish Albums (ZPAV)	89
