= Like an Ever Flowing Stream =

Studio album by Dismember
- Released: 28 May 1991
- Recorded: March 1991
- Studio: Sunlight Studios, Sweden
- Genre: Death metal
- Length: 31:06
- Label: Nuclear Blast
- Producer: Tomas Skogsberg and Fred Estby

Dismember chronology
| Like an Ever Flowing Stream (1991) | Indecent & Obscene (1993) |

Like an Ever Flowing Stream is the debut album by Swedish death metal band Dismember, released on 28 May 1991 through Nuclear Blast.

== Background ==
Nicke Andersson, at the time the drummer in Entombed played all the lead guitars except for the guitar solo on "Override of the Overture", which is played by David Blomqvist.

The title may refer to the Biblical Book of Amos 5:24, "Let justice roll down like waters, and righteousness like an ever-flowing stream" (New International Version).

A music video was made for the track "Soon to Be Dead". Since Karmageddon Records owns the rights to the album, it was not re-issued as a digipack disc in 2005 like every other album (except for Where Ironcrosses Grow). Regain re-issued those digipack versions and also remastered the albums while Karmageddon released an exact copy of the 1996 issue by Nuclear Blast (except for two additional bonus tracks).

== Music ==
The album makes use of heavily distorted and downtuned guitar and bass riffing. The drumming is influenced by punk rock, and has been said to "[owe] more to Discharge than Slayer." The album's vocals have been described as "barks, gurgles, and roars," and have been said to sound like a "pissed-off Rottweiler with a mouthful of fresh blood." The album's production has been described as sounding "as if it's going to fall apart."

== Artwork ==
The album's artwork was created by Dan Seagrave. He recounted the creation process: "I made some simple rough sketches, and had two weeks to make the final. The hidden subterranean scene evokes my interest in the aesthetics of old adventure fantasy type films, as well as the idea of ancient lost civilizations."

== Reception and legacy ==
Professional ratings
Review scores
| Source | Rating |
|---|---|
| AllMusic | 5/5 stars |
| Rock Hard | 8.5/10 stars |
| Metal.de | 10/10 stars |
| Powermetal.de | |

The album is considered to be a classic in the death metal genre.

The album's influence has been observed in the work of Bloodbath and Death Breath.

Modern reviews for Like an Ever Flowing Stream have been positive. AllMusic's Phil Freeman gave the album a rating of five stars and called it "one of the crucial documents of the early-'90s Swedish death metal scene." Adam McCann of Metal Digest noted that, "Alongside Entombed, Grave and Unleashed, this debut album didn't just help place Swedish death metal on the map, it took the flag and slammed it through a lifeless corpse, unveiling the blue and yellow. For many fans of Dismember, Like an Ever Flowing Stream is often regarded as not just their favourite Dismember album, but also one of the best death metal albums of all time".

In 2010, the album was inducted into Decibel magazine's Hall of Fame.

== Track listing ==
All tracks are written by Dismember; arrangements by Dismember.

| No. | Title | Length |
|---|---|---|
| 1. | "Override of the Overture" | 5:15 |
| 2. | "Soon to Be Dead" | 1:55 |
| 3. | "Bleed for Me" | 3:20 |
| 4. | "And So Is Life" | 3:11 |
| 5. | "Dismembered" | 5:54 |
| 6. | "Skin Her Alive" | 2:15 |
| 7. | "Sickening Art" | 3:55 |
| 8. | "In Death's Sleep" | 5:21 |
| Total length: | | 31:06 |

1996 Reissue
| No. | Title | Length |
|---|---|---|
| 9. | "Deathevocation" | 4:45 |
| 10. | "Defective Decay" | 4:03 |
| Total length: | | 39:54 |

2005 Reissue
| No. | Title | Length |
|---|---|---|
| 9. | "Deathevocation" | 4:45 |
| 10. | "Defective Decay" | 4:03 |
| 11. | "Torn Apart" | 4:43 |
| 12. | "Justifiable Homicide" | 3:17 |
| Total length: | | 47:45 |

== Personnel ==
Dismember

- Matti Kärki – vocals
- Robert Senneback – guitar
- David Blomqvist – guitar, lead guitar on track 1
- Richard Diamon – bass
- Fred Estby – drums

Additional musician

- Nicke Andersson – lead guitar on all tracks (except track 1)

Production

- Produced & Mixed by Tomas Skogsberg & Fred Estby
- Recorded & Engineered by Tomas Skogsberg
- Dan Seagrave – Design, Cover Design
- Gottfrid Jarnefors – Photography
- Nicke Andersson - Dismember logo design

== Charts ==
2023 chart performance for Like an Ever Flowing Stream
| Chart (2023) | Peak position |
|---|---|
| German Albums (Offizielle Top 100) | 50 |
| Polish Albums (ZPAV) | 76 |
