= 2009 in Nordic music =

The following is a list of notable events and releases that happened in Nordic music in 2009.

== Events ==
- 13 January – Swedish band Lord Belial cancel all planned activities after their drummer, Micke Backelin, develops a hearing problem.
- 17 January – Copenhagen's new concert hall, Koncerthuset, is officially opened by Queen Margrethe II of Denmark.
- 23 January – Mezzo-soprano Marianne Beate Kielland is awarded the Nordlysprisen 2009 at Nordlysfestivalen.
- 31 January – Niels Brinck wins the Dansk Melodi Grand Prix 2009, with "Believe Again", written by Lars Halvor Jensen, Martin Michael Larsson and Ronan Keating. A new voting format is used for the competition.
- 1 February – Lead vocalist Petri Lindroos leaves Finnish band Norther, to be replaced by Aleksi Sihvonen.
- 5 February – Swedish band Steel Attack announce that guitarist Simon Johansson is leaving.
- 8 February – At the 51st Annual Grammy Awards, the award for Best Instrumental Soloist(s) Performance (With Orchestra) goes to Hilary Hahn with the Swedish Radio Symphony Orchestra conducted by Esa-Pekka Salonen.
- 23 February – Iceland's Ólafur Arnalds and the Faroes' Janus Rasmussen announce the recording debut of their new duo, Kiasmos.
- March – Norwegian musician Varg Vikernes is released from prison on parole after 16 years served for the murder of another musician, Øystein Aarseth (aka Euronymous).
- 30 March – Vocalist Roland Johansson announces he is leaving Swedish band Sonic Syndicate. He is later replaced by Nathan James Biggs.
- 15 May – Hrafna Hanna Elísa Herbertsdóttir wins the fourth series of Idol stjörnuleit, Iceland's version of Pop Idols.
- 16 May – Belarus-born Alexander Rybak wins the Eurovision Song Contest 2009 in Moscow for Norway with the song "Fairytale".
- 10 June – The complete version of Frederik Magle's Cantabile is premièred at the Koncerthuset, Copenhagen, at a concert to celebrate the 75th birthday of Henrik, Prince Consort of Denmark, on whose poems the work was based.
- 18 June – The Norwegian Arctic Philharmonic Orchestra, Nordnorsk Opera og Symfoniorkester, is founded in Tromsø.
- 25 July – Masterplan announce that Norwegian vocalist Jørn Lande has returned to the band.
- 2 November – Hymn to Life – Entr'acte, the autobiography of former Stratovarius member Timo Tolkki, is published through Goldenworks Ltd./Blacksmith Ltd.
- 11 November – Mikkel Sandager, Morten Sandager and Mike Park announce that they are leaving Danish band Mercenary.
- 11 December – Performers at the Nobel Peace Prize Concert in Oslo include Amadou & Mariam, Alexander Rybak, Donna Summer, Lang Lang and the Norwegian Radio Orchestra.
- 22 December – Per Eriksson and Niklas Sandin join Katatonia after the Norrman brothers leave the band.

== New works ==
- Kalevi Aho – String Quintet Hommage à Schubert
- Anders Eliasson – Concerto per violino, viola ed orchestra da camera: dubbelkonsert för violin, viola och kammarorkester (Concerto for Violin, Viola and Orchestra: Double Concerto for Violin, Viola and Chamber Orchestra [2 Horns, 2 Oboes und Strings])
- Ilkka Kuusisto – Taipaleenjoki
- Magnus Lindberg – Graffiti, for chorus and orchestra
- Frederik Magle – Symphonic suite Cantabile
- Einojuhani Rautavaara – Towards the Horizon (second cello concerto)
- Esa-Pekka Salonen – Violin Concerto
- Marie Samuelsson – Sjörök under Stockholms broar (Sea smoke under Stockholms bridges), for string quartet

== Film scores and incidental music ==
- Kristian Eidnes Andersen – Antichrist
- Jacob Groth – The Girl with the Dragon Tattoo

== Albums released ==
=== January ===
Day	Album	Artist	Label	Notes	Ref.
23	Sirenia	The 13th Floor	Nuclear Blast Records	Partly recorded in the US	
30	Deathstars	Night Electric Night	Nuclear Blast		

=== February ===
Day	Album	Artist	Label	Notes	Ref.
3	This Ending	Dead Harvest	Metal Blade		
25	Syster Sol	Dömd att bli bedömd	Rudeboy Records		
27	Arch Enemy	Manifesto of Arch Enemy	Century Media Records	Compilation album	

=== March ===
Day	Album	Artist	Label	Notes	Ref.
11	Nightwish	Made in Hong Kong (And in Various Other Places)	Spinefarm, Roadrunner, Nuclear Blast	Live album	31 March 2009 (US)
11	Dark the Suns	All Ends in Silence	Firebox Records		

=== April ===
Day	Album	Artist	Label	Notes	Ref.
9	Beherit	Engram	Spinefarm Records		
15	Ajattara	Noitumaa	Ranka Recordings		
21	Bloodbound	Tabula Rasa	Blistering Records		
27	Unanimated	In the Light of Darkness	Regain Records	First album after a ten-year break	

=== May ===
Day	Album	Artist	Label	Notes	Ref.
6	Amoral	Show Your Colors	Spinefarm	First album with Ari Koivunen	
13	Amberian Dawn	The Clouds of Northland Thunder	KHY Suomen Musiikki		
29	Alexander Rybak	Fairytales	EMI	Debut album	

=== June ===
Day	Album	Artist	Label	Notes	Ref.
16	Madder Mortem	Eight Ways	Peaceville Records		
24	Elias Viljanen	Fire-Hearted	Spinefarm Records		

=== July ===
Day	Album	Artist	Label	Notes	Ref.
29	Pantheon I	Worlds I Create	Candlelight Records		

=== August ===
Day	Album	Artist	Label	Notes	Ref.
28	Jorn	Dukebox	AFM Records	Compilation of tracks from Jørn Lande's solo albums	

=== September ===
Day	Artist	Album	Label	Notes	Ref.
7	Solveig Slettahjell & Slow Motion Orchestra	Tarpan Seasons	Universal Music Group		
22	Children of Bodom	Skeletons in the Closet	Spinefarm Records	Compilation album	
25	Basshunter	Bass Generation	Warner Music Sweden		

=== October ===
Day	Album	Artist	Label	Notes	Ref.
2	Scar Symmetry	Dark Matter Dimensions	Nuclear Blast	First album without Christian Älvestam	
14	Decadence	Chargepoint	Universal		
14	Waltari	Below Zero	Stay Heavy Records		
12	Tord Gustavsen Ensemble	Restored, Returned	ECM Records	Featuring Kristin Asbjørnsen, Tore Brunborg, Mats Eilertsen and Jarle Vespestad	

=== November ===
Day	Album	Artist	Label	Notes	Ref.
2	Katatonia	Night Is the New Day	Peaceville Records		

=== December ===
Day	Album	Artist	Label	Notes	Ref.
9	Yngwie Malmsteen	High Impact	Rising Force Records	Compilation album	

== Deaths ==
- 8 January – Björn Haugan, 66, Swedish-born Norwegian operatic tenor (born 1942).
- 31 January – Erland von Koch, 98, Swedish composer
- 10 February – Eva Gustavson, 91, Norwegian operatic contralto
- 18 February – Miika Tenkula, 34, rock guitarist and songwriter (heart attack)
- 3 March – Flemming Flindt, 72, Danish choreographer
- 11 March – Lars Erstrand, Swedish vibraphonist
- 26 March – Arne Bendiksen, 82, Norway's "father of pop"
- 11 April – Gerda Gilboe, 94, Danish actress and singer
- 1 May – Torstein Grythe, 90, Norwegian choirmaster
- 21 July – Marcel Jacob, 45, Swedish rock musician (suicide)
- 20 November – Elisabeth Söderström, 82, Swedish singer
- 21 November – Gerhard Aspheim, 79, Norwegian trombonist
