= Unsane, Insane and Mentally Deranged =

Studio album by Murder Squad
- Released: March 2001
- Genre: Death metal
- Length: 33:23
- Label: Pavement Music

Murder Squad chronology
Unsane, Insane and Mentally Deranged (2001)	Ravenous, Murderous (2003)

Professional ratings
Review scores
Source	Rating
AllMusic	2.5/5
Chronicles of Chaos	8.5/10
Rock Hard	6.5/10

Unsane, Insane and Mentally Deranged is the debut album by Murder Squad. It was released in 2001.

The album was rated two and a half out of five stars by AllMusic. Metal Temple Magazine gave it an eight out of ten.

== Track listing ==
No.	Title	Length
1.	"Slowly Burnt to Death"	3:18
2.	"Twisted High"	1:37
3.	"Deprevation"	3:33
4.	"The Return of the Rotten"	2:47
5.	"Unsane, Insane and Mentally Deranged"	3:28
6.	"The Probing"	2:47
7.	"Spraying Lead"	3:05
8.	"Bloodfreak"	2:56
9.	"Sent Home in a Box"	2:22
10.	"Sacrificial Strangulation, Beating and Rape"	3:56
11.	"Impaled"	2:06
12.	"Horror Eternal"	1:25
Total length:		33:23

== Credits ==
- Matti Kärki - vocals
- Richard Cabeza - bass
- Uffe Cederlund - guitars
- Peter Stjärnvind - drums

== Charts ==
Chart performance for Unsane, Insane and Mentally Deranged
Chart (2026)	Peak position
Swedish Hard Rock Albums (Sverigetopplistan)	15
Swedish Physical Albums (Sverigetopplistan)	7
