= Stinking Up the Night =

Studio album by Death Breath
- Released: 2006
- Genre: Death metal
- Length: 33:58
- Label: Black Lodge Records; Relapse Records

Death Breath chronology
Death Breath (EP) (2006)	Stinking Up the Night (2006)	Let It Stink (2007)

Professional ratings
Review scores
Source	Rating
Blabbermouth	8.5/10 stars

Stinking Up the Night is the debut album by the Swedish old-school death metal band Death Breath, released in 2006.

== Track listing ==
1. "Death Breath" – 2:55
2. "Chopping Spree" – 3:28
3. "Heading for Decapitation" – 2:57
4. "Dragged through the Mud" – 4:08
5. "Coffins of the Unembalmed Dead" – 3:19
6. "A Morbid Mind" – 3:54
7. "Reduced to Ashes" – 2:45
8. "Christ All Fucking Mighty" – 2:23
9. "Flabby Little Things from Beyond" – 3:17
10. "Cthulhu Fhtagn!" – 4:52

== Personnel ==
Death Breath

- Nicke Andersson - Drums, guitars
- Robert Pehrsson - Vocals, guitars
- Magnus Hedquist - Bass

Guest musicians

- Scott Carlson - Vocals on "Chopping Spree", "Coffins of the Unembalmed Dead", "Christ All Fucking Mighty"
- Jörgen Sandström - Vocals on "Heading for Decapitation", "A Morbid Mind", "Flabby Little Things from Beyond"
- Fred Estby - Additional vocals on "Death Breath"
