= Necrology (disambiguation) =

A necrology is a register or list of records of the deaths of people.

Necrology may also refer to:

- Necrology (EP), a 1991 EP by General Surgery
- Necrology, a 1971 film by Standish Lawder

== See also ==
- Thanatology, the scientific study of death
