= As Blood Rains from the Sky... We Walk the Path of Endless Fire =

Studio album by Fleshcrawl
- Released: 11 April 2000
- Recorded: 13–25 July 1999 at Studio Fredman in Gothenburg, Sweden
- Genre: Death metal
- Length: 39:44
- Label: Metal Blade
- Producer: Fleshcrawl

Fleshcrawl chronology
Bloodred Massacre (1997)	As Blood Rains from the Sky... We Walk the Path of Endless Fire (2000)	Soulskinner (2002)

As Blood Rains from the Sky... We Walk the Path of Endless Fire is the fifth studio album by the German death metal band Fleshcrawl.

This album is highly typical of Fleshcrawl's mid-to-late career material, and resembles contemporary work by such melodic/Swedish death metal bands as Dismember, Entombed, and Arch Enemy. It utilizes highly melodic and aerobically rhythmic mid-to-high guitar range with rapid tempos and short, highly agile guitar solos, and is consequently very characteristic of the Swedish-style death metal sound that has dominated their work since the late 1990s. A slightly brutal sound present in the drumwork, which consists of very high-tempo double bass drum rolls and the occasional blast beats, serves to accent the melodic death metal rhythmics of the album without creating a sense of disorganization and chaos, while the guttural, abrasive vocals, somewhat reminiscent of such bands as Six Feet Under and Deicide enhance the intensity of the album.

== Track listing ==
No.	Title	Length
1.	"March of the Dead (Intro)"	2:00
2.	"Path of Endless Fire"	1:52
3.	"Under the Banner of Death"	3:27
4.	"As Blood Rains from the Sky"	3:14
5.	"Embraced by Evil"	3:29
6.	"The Dark Side of My Soul"	4:31
7.	"Swords of Darkness" (Exciter cover)	3:25
8.	"Impure Massacre of Bloody Souls"	3:56
9.	"Creation of Wrath"	3:40
10.	"Graves of the Tortured"	3:40
11.	"Feed the Demon's Heart"	5:21
12.	"The Day Man Lost" (Bonus track; Carnage cover)	1:16

== Personnel ==
- Sven Gross – vocals
- Mike Hanus – guitar, bass
- Stefan Hanus – guitar
- Bastian Herzog – drums

=== Production ===
- Produced by Fleshcrawl
- Recorded and mixed at Studio Fredman, Gothenburg, Sweden, 13–25 July 1999
- Engineered by Anders Fridén & Rune Johansson
- Mixed by Fleshcrawl & Fredrik Nordström
- Mastered by Peter in de Betou at Cuttingroom, Stockholm-Solna, Sweden
- All music and lyrics by Fleshcrawl except "Swords of Darkness", originally by Exciter (music: Allan Johnson; lyrics: Dan Beehler) and "The Day Man Lost", originally by Carnage (Michael Amott and Johan Liiva)
- Intro by Jens Grimminger. Cover artwork by Uwe Jarling. Band photo by Axel Liebhardt
- Layout by Stefan & Mike Hanus. Graphic work by Stefan Hanus
