= Indecent & Obscene =

Studio album by Dismember
- Released: 24 June 1993
- Recorded: November–December 1992 at Sunlight Studios, Sweden
- Genre: Death metal
- Length: 35:15
- Label: Nuclear Blast
- Producer: Tomas Skogsberg & Fred Estby

Dismember chronology
| Like an Ever Flowing Stream (1991) | Indecent & Obscene (1993) | Massive Killing Capacity (1995) |

Professional ratings
Review scores
| Source | Rating |
|---|---|
| AllMusic | 3/5 stars |
| Rock Hard | 7.5/10 stars |
| Metal.de | 9/10 stars |
| Powermetal.de | |

Indecent & Obscene is the second studio album by Swedish death metal band Dismember. The album is accompanied by two music videos for the tracks "Skinfather" and "Dreaming in Red".

== Track listing ==
All songs written by Matti Kärki and Fred Estby, except for where noted.

| No. | Title | Length |
|---|---|---|
| 1. | "Fleshless" | 2:58 |
| 2. | "Skinfather" | 3:51 |
| 3. | "Sorrowfilled" | 4:09 |
| 4. | "Case # Obscene" | 3:38 |
| 5. | "Souldevourer" | 3:39 |
| 6. | "Reborn in Blasphemy" | 4:49 |
| 7. | "Eviscerated (Bitch)" | 2:20 |
| 8. | "9th Circle" | 4:34 |
| 9. | "Dreaming in Red" | 5:20 |
| Total length: | | 35:15 |

| No. | Title | Length |
|---|---|---|
| 10. | "Hill 112" (Re-issue bonus track) |
| 11. | "Beyond the Unholy Grave" (Death cover) Re-issue bonus track) |

== Charts ==
2023 chart performance for Indecent & Obscene
| Chart (2023) | Peak position |
|---|---|
| German Albums (Offizielle Top 100) | 49 |
| Polish Albums (ZPAV) | 70 |
