= Made of Flesh =

Studio album by Fleshcrawl
- Released: 9 March 2004
- Recorded: 3–21 November 2003
- Studios: Studio Underground, Vasterås, Sweden
- Genre: Death metal
- Length: 44:38
- Language: English
- Label: Metal Blade
- Producer: Fleshcrawl

Fleshcrawl chronology
Soulskinner (2002)	Made of Flesh (2004)	Structures of Death (2007)

Professional ratings
Review scores
Source	Rating
Scream Magazine	5/6 stars

Made of Flesh is the seventh studio album by the German death metal band Fleshcrawl. It is considered the sequel to Soulskinner and is the first of their albums to feature their current guitarist Oliver Grbavac, who joined the band to replace founding member Stefan Hanus and the last to feature bass guitarist Tobias Schick.

Being widely considered a de facto sequel to Soulskinner, the two albums share a highly similar sound, which is general of Fleshcrawl's work since the late 1990s. Both albums feature prominent Swedish death metal-style guitar work, composed of eminently rhythmic riffing and short, moderately technical guitar solos, not unlike many contemporary bands of the melodic death metal genre, particularly Dismember, Grave, and to an extent, Arch Enemy. As is typical of Fleshcrawl's latest work, the melodic guitar rhythms are complemented with a familiar drum sound, consisting of blast beats incorporated into highly embossed, yet not obtrusive, rapid double bass drum-rolls, with semi-guttural death growls reminiscent of such Florida-based death metal bands as Cannibal Corpse, Six Feet Under, and Suffocation.

Lyrical themes of this album remain consistent with those of previous Fleshcrawl albums and of death metal in general. Subjects cover gory themes and concepts of evil, including doomsday/the apocalypse ("Beneath a Dying Sun", "Damned in Fire"), demons/demonic possession ("Flesh Bloody Flesh", "Demons of the Dead"), damnation ("Forged in Blood"), and necrophagy ("Carnal Devourment"), among others. The Japanese release included a cover of "Rockin' Is My Business" by The Four Horsemen, a late-80s metal band from California; this song is dissimilar to every other song on the album, in that it doesn't cover general death metal lyrical themes of death, gore, violence, etc., but rather is about both the glory and tribulations of the music industry.

== Track listing ==
1. "Beneath a Dying Sun" – 4:41
2. "Made of Flesh" – 4:03
3. "Scourge of the Bleeding Haunted" – 3:59
4. "Into the Depths of No Return" – 4:47
5. "Flesh Bloody Flesh" – 3:20
6. "Forged in Blood" – 4:59
7. "Damned in Fire" – 2:39
8. "Demons of the Dead" – 3:20
9. "Carnal Devourment" – 3:57
10. "When Life Surrenders" – 4:53
11. "Rockin' Is My Business" (only included on the Japan release)

== Personnel ==
- Sven Gross – vocals
- Tobias Schick – bass
- Oliver Grbavac – guitar
- Mike Hanus – guitar
- Bastian Herzog – drums

=== Production ===
- Produced by Fleshcrawl
- Recorded and mixed at Studio Underground, Vasterås, Sweden, 3–21 November 2003
- Engineered by Pelle Saether and Lars Linden
- Mixed by Pelle Saether & Fleshcrawl
- Mastered by Achim Köhler at Indiscreet-Audio, Hohengehren, Germany
- All music and lyrics by Fleshcrawl, except "Rockin' Is My Business", originally by The Four Horsemen (Starr/Lizmi/Montgomery)
- Cover artwork by Uwe Jarling
- Photos by Alex Kuehr
- Layout by Stefan & Mike Hanus
- Graphic work by Stefan Hanus
