= Fleshcrawl =

German death metal band

- Origin: Illertissen, Germany
- Genre: Death metal
- Years active: 1987–present
- Members: Bastian Herzog; Manuel Markowski; Christian Kalbrecht; Apu Justin Reisch; Borisz Sarafutgyinov
- Past members: Wendelin Dopfer; Alfred Handke; Gero Schmitt; Alex Pretzer; Markus Amann; Stefan Hanus; Sven Gross; Tobias Schick; Nico Scheffler; Mike Hanus; Slobodan Stupar; Oliver Grbavac
- Website: fleshcrawl.net

Fleshcrawl is a German death metal band formed in Illertissen, Bavaria, in 1987. Their most recent album, Epitome of Carnage, was released in 2026 under Reigning Phoenix.

== History ==
=== 1987–1997 ===
Bastian Herzog and Stefan Hanus formed Fleshcrawl in 1987 as Morgöth. In 1990, after lead vocalist Wendelin Dopfer left the band, Alex Pretzer signed on. The band changed their name to Suffocation and released the demo tape Festering Flesh. After the release of their demo tape, the band changed their name because the American band Suffocation had released their first vinyl cut earlier. The band was officially renamed to Fleshcrawl and released their first 7-inch EP, Lost in a Grave, in 1991, through Morbid Records. They played one of their first shows under the new name in their hometown in October 1991. It was an underground concert with German bands Dead and R.U.Dead? and Demigod from Finland.

In 1992, Fleshcrawl signed a recording contract with Black Mark Production. They recorded their debut studio album, Descend into the Absurd, at Montezuma Studios, Stockholm in June 1992. Shortly after the release of Descend into the Absurd, founding member Stefan Hanus's brother Mike replaced Gero Schmitt as one of the guitarists. They began recording their second studio album, Impurity, in 1993 at Dan Swanö's Unisound Studio.

In 1995, Markus Amann left the band and Mike Hanus took over as the bassist for studio sessions. In December 1995, Fleshcrawl recorded their third studio album, Bloodsoul, released in 1996. Shortly after the release of Bloodsoul, Fleshcrawl began recording their fourth studio album, Bloodred Massacre, released in 1997 with Sven Gross replacing Alex Pretzer as lead vocalist. Both albums were recorded at Abyss Studios by Peter Tägtgren of Hypocrisy.

=== 1998–present ===
The cover of As Blood Rains from the Sky is artist Uwe Jarling's depiction of the band as corpses. It is the foundation of their shift into Melodic death metal, and archetypal of their present sound

In 1998, Tobias Schick took over as the new bassist, allowing Mike Hanus to return to playing guitar exclusively. After the release of Bloodred Massacre, Fleshcrawl left Black Mark Production and joined a monthlong tour with Kataklysm and Vader, as well as participating in festivals with Cannibal Corpse and Dark Funeral. After returning from their tour, Fleshcrawl signed a recording contract with Metal Blade Records, and in January 2000, they released their fifth studio album, As Blood Rains from the Sky... We Walk the Path of Endless Fire, which was produced at Studio Fredman in Gothenburg, Sweden. In June 2000 the band went out to tour Europe again, this time 25 performances with Vader and Vital Remains had been scheduled. Individual shows and various festival appearances followed (among others at the Czech Dynamo Festival and the Summer Breeze Open Air in Bavaria, Germany).

In September 2001, Fleshcrawl began recording their sixth studio album, Soulskinner at Studio Underground in Västeras, Sweden. Soulskinner was introduced live on a four-week tour with Bolt Thrower and Benediction in January 2002. In spring 2002, Stefan Hanus left the band for personal reasons. He was replaced by Oliver Grbavac and the band played at Wacken Open Air. In November 2002, Fleshcrawl played their first tour in Japan in support of Hypocrisy.

During 2003, the band played few live shows in order to focus on writing their seventh studio album. In November 2003, Fleshcrawl again entered Studio Underground in Sweden to record their seventh studio album, Made of Flesh, which was musically similar to Soulskinner. Made Of Flesh was released on 23 February 2004 in Europe and Japan and on 9 March 2004 in the United States, and following its release the band played a few shows, including the Summer Breeze Open Air and the Party.San Metal Open Air in Thuringia, Germany. The band also supported Made of Flesh by touring with Six Feet Under and Criminal in Europe in February/March 2004.

In 2005, Fleshcrawl released a compilation album, Crawling in Flesh – The Best of Fleshcrawl, which featured fifteen tracks from their first 4 full-length albums.

In early 2007, Nico Scheffler replaced Tobias Schick as the band's bassist and the band began to work on their eighth studio album, Structures of Death. It was released in Europe on 24 September 2007. Following the album's release, Fleshcrawl played a few shows around central Europe with bands such as Carnal Forge, Dismember, Enslaved, and Jungle Rot, and also played several metal festivals.

In 2011, bassist Nico Scheffler left Fleshcrawl, but was quickly replaced by Manuel Markowski. The group did not release new music between 2008 and 2015. This was due to various private problems of the musicians and a longer stay abroad by drummer Bastian Herzog. Nevertheless, the band played several individual and festival shows during this time. Just to mention a few notable ones: The SWR Barroselas in Portugal (2008), the German Protzen Open Air, Summer Breeze and Queens of Metal in the same year, Chronical Moshers (2010), Way of Darkness (2011), Stromgitarrenfest III (2012), Rock Hard Festival and Bang Your Head (both in 2013), Baden in Blut (2014) and the Faces of Death in Moscow, Russia (2014). Fleshcrawl also performed a headliner show in Dubai in the United Arab Emirates in March 2012. At the end of 2015, Fleshcrawl and Skinned Alive produced a split CD which included four new songs by the musicians and was initially released by Brutal Art Records, later, in the course of the year 2016, by FDA Rekotz.

In January 2016, the band performed on their first ever Asian tour. They played eight shows in seven different countries – the United Arab Emirates, Nepal, Thailand, Taiwan, Philippines, Singapore and Vietnam. In the course of this, the band was the headliner at the Nepal Deathfest in Kathmandu and co-headliner at a The Exploited show in Singapore. Later in 2016, the band released Festering Thoughts from a Grave – a CD re-release of their two demos and the Lost in a Grave EP (Raw Skull Recordz).

In 2017 and 2018, the group played concerts and festivals, including appearances at the Schoonebeek Deathfest in the Netherlands (2017), Obscene Extreme in the Czech Republic (2018), Helsinki Deathfest in Finland and Way of Darkness in Germany (both also in 2018). In October 2018, the band split from their longtime guitarist Mike Hanus, who was replaced by Slobodan Stupar. In December, Fleshcrawl performed at the Eindhoven Metal Meeting. In 2019, further individual and festival shows in Central Europe and the UK followed. In May 2019, the group entered North American territory for the very first time to perform at the renowned Maryland Deathfest in Baltimore, US.

Back in Germany, Fleshcrawl completed their work on the long-awaited follow-up to Structures of Death. Into the Catacombs of Flesh was released by Apostasy Records on 29 November 2019. But already in March 2020 the personnel carousel turned again: Guitarist Slobodan Stupar found his successor in Christian Kalbrecht. Another change of personnel occurred after an almost concertless year (due to COVID-19) in December 2020. Fleshcrawl separated from guitarist Oliver Grbavac and got Apu Justin Reisch on board instead.

On 11 June 2021, vocalist Sven Gross died from cancer at the age of 44. Later in the year, Russian-born vocalist Borisz Sarafutgyinov performed with the band at the Obscene Extreme festival in the Czech Republic. On 15 October, Fleshcrawl officially announced Sarafutgyinov as the official new vocalist of the band.

In April 2026, the band announced their new album, Epitome of Carnage, which was released on 12 June of the same year.

== Musical style ==
Fleshcrawl, although their overall style has evolved over the years, remains quite similar- and often compared to such Scandinavian/melodic death metal bands as Grave and Dismember. Like these bands, Fleshcrawl creates a familiar, mid-range guitar tone with rapid tempos and short guitar solos consisting of fast, nimble alto-range progressions. However, the band's drumwork since the mid-to-late 1990s, composed mainly of high-speed, rolling double-bass drums and blast beats is comparable to that of many brutal death metal bands, such as Nile and Skinless, but at the same time, is down-tuned enough to not lose its kinship with the melodic death metal genre.

Occasionally, they incorporate organs and other instruments, such as trumpets and kettle drums into their music, particularly in their instrumental intros and interludes.

Fleshcrawl's lyrical themes are generally characteristic of typical death metal, and encompass such concepts as insanity, horror, doomsday, war, murder, misanthropy, genocide, gore, slavery, and sacrifice, among other lyrical concepts familiar to death metal.

== Members ==
=== Current members ===
- Bastian Herzog – drums, backing vocals (1987–present)
- Manuel Markowski – bass (2011–present)
- Christian Kalbrecht – guitars (2020–present)
- Apu Justin Reisch – guitars (2020–present)
- Borisz Sarafutgyinov – lead vocals (2021–present)

=== Former members ===
- Stefan Hanus – guitars (1987–2002)
- Markus Amann – bass (1987–1995)
- Alfred Handke – guitars (1987–1991)
- Wendelin Dopfer – lead vocals (1987–1990)
- Alex Pretzer – lead vocals (1990–1996)
- Gero Schmitt – guitars (1991–1992)
- Mike Hanus – guitars (1992–2018), bass (1995–1997)
- Sven Gross – lead vocals (1996–2021; his death)
- Tobias Schick – bass (1998–2005)
- Oliver Grbavac – guitars (2002–2020)
- Nico Scheffler – bass (2007–2011)
- Slobodan Stupar – guitars (2018–2020)

== Discography ==
=== Studio albums ===
Album information
Descend into the Absurd
- Released: 23 November 1992 (Germany)
- Label: Black Mark
Impurity
- Released: 31 May 1994 (Germany)
- Label: Black Mark
Bloodsoul
- Released: 4 June 1996 (Germany)
- Label: Black Mark
Bloodred Massacre
- Released: 13 October 1997 (Germany)
- Label: Black Mark
As Blood Rains from the Sky... We Walk the Path of Endless Fire
- Released: 11 April 2000 (Germany)
- Label: Metal Blade
Soulskinner
- Released: 15 January 2002 (Germany)
- Label: Metal Blade
Made of Flesh
- Released: 9 March 2004 (Germany)
- Label: Metal Blade
Structures of Death
- Released: 21 September 2007 (Germany)
- Label: Metal Blade
Into the Catacombs of Flesh
- Released: 29 November 2019 (Germany)
- Label: Apostasy Records
Epitome of Carnage
- Released: 12 June 2026
- Label: Reigning Phoenix

=== EPs ===
Album information
Lost in a Grave
- Released: 1991 (Germany)
- Label: Morbid Records

=== Split CDs ===
Album information
Tales of Flesh and Skin
- Released: 16 January 2016 (Germany)
- Label: Brutal Art Records; FDA Rekotz (later)

=== Compilations ===
Album information
Crawling in Flesh
- Released: 22 March 2006 (Germany)
- Label: Black Mark
Festering Thoughts from a Grave
- Released: 21 October 2016 (Germany)
- Label: Raw Skull Recordz
