= Left-Hand Path (disambiguation) =

Left-hand path is a term used in Western esotericism.

Left-Hand Path may also refer to:

- Left Hand Path (album), a 1990 album by Entombed
- "Left-Hand Path" (Runaways), an episode of Runaways
- Vamachara, a Sanskrit term meaning "left-hand path" or "left-handed attainment"

== See also ==
- Left Hand Pathology, a 2006 album by General Surgery
