= Murder Squad =

Swedish death metal band

Murder Squad is a Swedish death metal band formed in 1993 in Stockholm. It consists of Rickard Cabeza, Matti Kärki, Uffe Cederlund, and Peter Stjärnwind. It is a side project of two Dismember members and two Entombed members. American group Autopsy influenced the band. On their second album, Ravenous, Murderous, Chris Reifert of Autopsy appears as a guest singer. After Cederlund left Entombed, Kärki announced the end of Murder Squad. The band reunited in 2013 for a one-off reunion show in which Jorgen Sandstrom replaced Cabeza.

== Members ==
- Matti Kärki – vocals
- Richard Cabeza – bass
- Uffe Cederlund – guitars
- Peter Stjärnvind – drums

== Discography ==
- Unsane, Insane and Mentally Deranged (2001)
- Ravenous, Murderous (2003)
