= In the Forest of the Dreaming Dead =

Studio album by Unanimated
- Released: February 1993
- Recorded: May–June 1992 at Unicorn/Moose Studios, Noble House Studios
- Genre: Melodic death metal, black metal
- Length: 43:29
- Label: No Fashion Records
- Producer: Anders Olsson, Micke Lindh and Unanimated

Unanimated chronology
In the Forest of the Dreaming Dead (1993)	Ancient God of Evil (1995)

In the Forest of the Dreaming Dead is the debut studio album by the Swedish melodic death metal band Unanimated.

== Track listing ==
No.	Title	Length
1.	"At Dawn/Whispering Shadows"	04:27
2.	"Blackness of the Fallen Star"	04:17
3.	"Fire Storm"	05:28
4.	"Storms from the Skies of Grief"	03:37
5.	"Through the Gates"	03:53
6.	"Wind of a Dismal Past"	03:57
7.	"Silence Ends"	01:34
8.	"Mournful Twilight"	03:24
9.	"In the Forest of the Dreaming Dead"	04:43
10.	"Cold Northern Breeze"	04:42
11.	"Buried Alive" (Venom cover)	03:27
Total length:		43:29

- The original No Fashion Records (NFR004) release has an incorrect track listing.

== Personnel ==
- Peter Stjärnvind - drums
- Jonas Mellberg - guitar
- Micke Jansson - vocals
- Daniel Lofthagen - bass
- Jojje Bohlin - guitar
- Jocke Westman - keyboards

=== Additional personnel ===
- Johan Edlund - vocals on and lyrics for "Cold Northern Breeze"
- Daniel L - artwork
- Richard Cabeza - lyrics
- Stefan Roos - photography
- Micke Lindh - engineering, mixing
- Anders Olsson - engineering, mixing

== Charts ==
Chart performance for In the Forest of the Dreaming Dead
Chart (2021)	Peak position
German Albums (Offizielle Top 100)	61
