= Smelly Old History =

Book series

- Author: Mary J. Dobson
- Language: English
- Subject: History
- Genre: Children's history
- Publisher: Oxford University Press
- Publication date: 1997 - 1998
- Publication place: United Kingdom

Smelly Old History is a series of illustrated children's books published by Oxford University Press. The books contain scratch and sniff panels to provide the reader with scents representative of their respective eras, such as in Tudor Odours both lavender and herbs, employed as defence against the plague, and Henry VIII's gangrenous toe, and in Mouldy Mummies an ancient Egyptian rat repellent made of cat grease and gazelle feces. A Washington Post article referred to Vile Vikings as "pretty silly--and smelly--but lots of fun".

The series was written by Mary J. Dobson, and was followed by a similar series entitled Smelly Science.

== Titles ==
The series consists of:

- Greek Grime (1998)
- Medieval Muck (1998)
- Mouldy Mummies (1998)
- Reeking Royals (1998)
- Roman Aromas (1997)
- Tudor Odours (1997)
- Victorian Vapours (1997)
- Vile Vikings (1998)
- Wartime Whiffs (1998)
