= Desultory =

Swedish death metal band

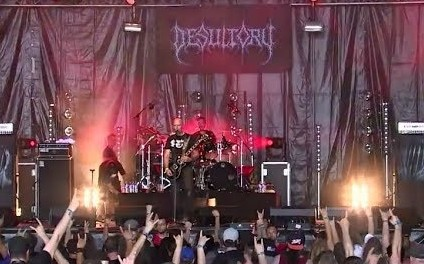
- Live at Hellfest 2015

Background information
- Origin: Stockholm, Sweden
- Genres: Death metal; death 'n' roll
- Years active: 1989–1996, 2009–2017
- Labels: Metal Blade; Relativity; Pulverised
- Members: Thomas Johnson "Snake"; Klas Morberg; Håkan Morberg; Jojje Bohlin

Desultory was part of the first wave of Swedish death metal bands, alongside Entombed, Dismember, Unleashed and others. Into Eternity, their Metal Blade debut following a lesser-known EP release, is standard for the genre, energetic and forceful, straddling the line between the more brutal American death style and the melodic Gothenburg variety.

Though not groundbreaking, it was considered a fine album by fans. By most accounts, their follow-up, Bitterness, is more of the same, but 1996's Swallow the Snake takes quite a different approach, dropping the death vocals (and, for the most part, death metal itself), for a more heavy rock sound likened by some to Soundgarden. Having been dropped by Metal Blade, they disappeared, but the three members from the Snake album recruited a new fourth member and, continuing the progression from that last album, continued on as the rock act Zebulon, releasing one EP and two LPs.

Aftonbladet has called Desultory's final album a "fine farewell."

== Reunion ==
The band reformed around 2008 and began the process of trying to find a new record deal along with writing new material. Having signed to the Singaporean label Pulverised Records, they released Counting Our Scars to critical acclaim, including the song "This Broken Halo".

== Line-up ==
- Klas Morberg – vocals/guitars
- Håkan Morberg – guitars (bass in 1992–1997)
- Jojje Bohlin – bass (2008–)
- Thomas Johnson – drums

=== Former members ===
- Stefan Pöge – lead guitar
- Jens Almgren – bass

== Discography ==
- From Beyond (Demo) (1990)
- Death Unfolds (Demo) (1990)
- Visions (Demo) (1991)
- Forever Gone EP (1991)
- Into Eternity (1993)
- Bitterness (1994)
- Swallow the Snake (1996)
- Counting Our Scars (2010)
- Through Aching Aeons (2017)
