= Death Breath =

Swedish death metal band

- Origin: Stockholm, Sweden
- Genre: Death metal
- Years active: 2005–present
- Labels: Relapse, Black Lodge
- Members: Robert Pehrsson; Nicke Andersson; Scott Carlson; Erik Wallin
- Past members: Mange Hedquist
- Website: deathbreath.se

Death Breath is a Swedish death metal band featuring Robert Pehrsson (Thunder Express/Dundertåget) and Nicke Andersson, formerly of the death metal band Entombed, who wanted to return to playing drums and death metal. The members of the band are members of other bands but do not consider Death Breath a side project. The band was formed in 2005, originally intended to be named Black Breath, but to the band's surprise, the name Death Breath had never been used by a metal band. The band consider their music pure death metal, free from seven-string guitars, five-string basses and triggered drums. The band's influences include Slayer, Venom, Black Sabbath, Autopsy, Celtic Frost as well as old horror movies and HP Lovecraft.

== Members ==
=== Current members ===
- Robert Pehrsson – vocals, guitar
- Nicke Andersson – drums, guitar, bass
- Scott Carlson – vocals, bass
- Erik Wallin – guitar

=== Former members ===
- Mange Hedquist – bass

=== Other contributors ===
- Jörgen Sandström – vocals
- Fred Estby – vocals
- Erik Sahlstrom – vocals

== Discography ==
Studio albums

- Stinking Up the Night (2006)

Extended plays

- Let It Stink (EP, 2007)
- The Old Hag (EP, 2022)

Singles

- "Death Breath" (2006)
