= Descend into the Absurd =

Studio album by Fleshcrawl
- Released: 23 November 1992
- Recorded: June 1992 at Montezuma Studio, Stockholm, Sweden
- Genre: Death metal, doom metal
- Length: 54:37
- Language: English
- Label: Black Mark
- Producer: Fleshcrawl

Fleshcrawl chronology
Descend into the Absurd (1992)	Impurity (1994)

Professional ratings
Review scores
Source	Rating
Metal Storm	8/10 stars
Metal Archives	9.5/10 stars

Descend into the Absurd is the first studio album by the German death metal band Fleshcrawl. It was the only Fleshcrawl album on which guitarist Giro Schmidt appeared.

== Music ==
Unlike later albums, Descend into the Absurd has minor black metal and doom metal elements to it, particularly in the guitar work, which is often less rhythmic and melodic than their later, Swedish-style death metal. The guitar melodies and tones often alternate somewhat abruptly between low, intense rhythms and high-beat, rapid progressions and the solowork has a very slight bluesy feel to it. The drumwork is typical of early Fleshcrawl, consisting of rapid double-bass drum rolls, heavy blast beats, and a somewhat "tinny" sound that, combined with their both searing mid-range and guttural low-range vocals makes their early sound unique.

== Track listing ==
All tracks by Fleshcrawl.

1. "Between Shadows They Crawl" – 2:32
2. "Phrenetic Tendencies" – 5:32
3. "Perpetual Dawn" – 6:42
4. "Purulent Bowel Erosion" – 5:11
5. "Lost in a Grave" – 7:05
6. "Never to Die Again" – 7:30
7. "Festering Flesh" – 6:44
8. "Infected Subconscious" – 6:25
9. "Evoke the Excess" – 6:56

== Personnel ==
- Alex Pretzer – vocals
- Gero Schmidt – guitar, backing vocals
- Stefan Hanus – guitar
- Markus Amann – bass
- Bastian Herzog – drums

=== Production ===
- Produced by Boss & Fleshcrawl
- Recorded and mixed at Montezuma Studio, Stockholm, Sweden, June 1992
- Recording and mixing engineer: Rex Gisslen
- All music and lyrics by Fleshcrawl
- Cover artwork by Uwe Jarling
- Graphic work by Headquarters Communication, Berlin, Germany
