= Let It Stink =

EP by Death Breath
- Released: 4 May 2007
- Recorded: 2007
- Genres: Death metal, death 'n' roll
- Length: 24:31
- Labels: Black Lodge, Relapse, Sound Pollution
- Producer: Death Breath

Death Breath chronology
Stinking Up the Night (2006)	Let It Stink (2007)

Professional ratings
Review scores
Source	Rating
Allmusic	3.5/5 stars
Exclaim!	(favorable)

Let It Stink is an EP by the band of the Death Breath. The EP's title and album cover are a reference to The Beatles album Let It Be.

== Track listing ==
1. "Giving Head to the Dead" – 3:07
2. "His Protoplasmic Worship" – 4:36
3. "Maimed and Slaughtered" (Discharge) – 1:49
4. "Dead But Walking" – 4:03
5. "Lycanthropy" (G.B.H.) – 2:29
6. "Sacrifice " (Bathory) – 3:51
7. "Twisted In Distaste" – 5:36

== Credits ==
- Robert Pehrsson – Guitar and Vocals on tracks 2,3,4 and 6
- Nicke Andersson – Drums, guitars and bass

=== Guests ===
- Scott Carlson – Vocals on tracks 1 and 5
- Erik Sahlstrom – Vocals on 7
- Michael Borg – Audio engineering, audio mixing
