= The County Medical Examiners =

American goregrind band

- Origin: Scotts Valley, California, U.S.
- Genres: Goregrind, grindcore
- Years active: 2001–present
- Labels: Relapse, Razorback
- Members: Morton Fairbanks; Jack Putnam; Guy Radcliffe
- Past members: Michelle Hayes

The County Medical Examiners is an American goregrind band that, in their own words, exist to recreating the sound of early Carcass albums. It was distinguished by a strange combination of goregrind and doom metal. The band is known for not playing live shows. All the current members have graduated with an MD in medical school or are currently taking medical school classes, hence the name of the band.

== History ==
The County Medical Examiners were formed in 2001. The band's original line up consisted of Dr. Morton Fairbanks on guitar/vocals, Dr. Jack Putnam on drums/vocals, and Michelle Hayes on bass/vocals. Michelle Hayes was, according to Dr. Fairbanks in an old interview on thecountymedicalexaminers.com, first exposed to the band when, as part of her probation due to a DUI charge, she toured the morgue where Dr. Fairbanks worked. Soon after they got together and recorded the EP Fetid Putrescent Whiffs, which saw limited release. The band recorded their debut full-length for Razorback Records, Forensic Fugues and Medicolegal Medleys. Not long after the album's release Michelle left the band to devote her time to medical school, and she was replaced by friend and colleague Dr. Guy Radcliffe, who is reportedly around 60 years of age. The current line-up went on to record a split LP, an EP, and a second full-length album, Olidous Operettas.

TCME released their Relapse Records debut, Olidous Operettas, in January 2007. The CD, which took more than a year and a half to write and record since all three band members live in different states, features eight tracks. Dr. Fairbanks described the effort as "somewhere between Symphonies of Sickness and Necroticism-era Carcass" and "not something you would want to put on before church." What makes the disc even more distinctive is that "it will be a scented-face CD, which essentially means it will be scratch and sniff-able," he said. "Our CD will smell like rotten meat."

For a while, the identity of the band members were shrouded in mystery, as they used pseudonyms to avoid the wrath of hospital administration and fan attention. In a 2012 interview with Pitchfork, Exhumed's Matt Widener admitted that the band was his side project, which he created "to take the Carcass clone phenomenon to its extreme conclusion [...] Eventually my plan was to even start looking like them, then release their album with just one note changed from each riff. But that's a lot of people to piss off in the name of a weird experiment, so I never really followed through."

== Members ==
- Dr. Jack Putnam, MD – drums, vocals (2001–present)
- Dr. Morton Fairbanks, MD – vocals, guitar, bass (2001–present)
- Dr. Guy Radcliffe, MD, PhD – bass, vocals (2002–present)

=== Former members ===
- Michelle Hayes – bass, vocals (2001–2002)

== Discography ==
- Fetid Putrescent Whiffs (Demo, 2001)
- Forensic Fugues and Medicolegal Medleys (LP, Razorback, 2001)
- General Surgery/The County Medical Examiners Split (split, Razorback, 2003)
- Reeking Rhapsodies for Chorale, Percussion, and Strings (EP, Noise-Squatch Records, 2004)
- Olidous Operettas (LP, Relapse, 2007)
