= Left Hand Pathology =

Studio album by General Surgery
- Released: 29 May 2006
- Recorded: December 2005 at Offbeat Studio, Stockholm, Sweden
- Genre: Goregrind, death metal
- Length: 33:53
- Label: Listenable
- Producer: General Surgery

General Surgery chronology
Necrology (1991)	Left Hand Pathology (2006)	Corpus in Extremis: Analysing Necrocriticism (2009)

Left Hand Pathology is a debut full-length album by Swedish goregrind/death metal band General Surgery after seventeen years forming. The title is a reference to the Entombed's album Left Hand Path. The cover illustrations was taken from "De humani corporis fabrica" by Andreas Vesalius (Brussels, 1514-1564).

== Track listing ==
No.	Title	Length
1.	"If These Walls Could Talk"	2:51
2.	"Ambulance Chaser"	3:03
3.	"Fulguration"	1:32
4.	"Arterial Spray Obsession"	2:39
5.	"Necrodecontamination"	1:20
6.	"The League of Extraordinary Grave Robbers"	2:30
7.	"The Admirable Teachings Of Burke & Hare"	2:26
8.	"Capricious Provisional Cadaver Grater"	1:33
9.	"Decomposer"	2:15
10.	"Viva! Blunt Force Trauma"	1:02
11.	"Cold Storage Fever"	1:36
12.	"Mucopurulent Mayhem"	0:59
13.	"Mortuary Wars"	3:30
14.	"Convivial Corpse Disposal Methodology"	6:37

== Personnel ==
General Surgery

- Andreas Mitroulis - Drums, Backing Vocals
- Joacim Carlsson - Guitars
- Glenn Sykes - Bass, Backing Vocals
- Grant McWilliams - Vocals
- Johan Wallin - Guitars, Backing Vocals

Guest musician

- Matti Kärki - Vocals

Production

- Emelie Helldén - Photography
- Glenn Sykes - Artwork, Layout, Cover concept
- Linus Nirbrant - Engineering, Mixing
- Anders Eriksson - Engineering, Mixing
- Peter in de Betou - Mastering
- K SST - Vinyl Mastering
