= General Surgery (band) =

Swedish goregrind band

- Origin: Stockholm, Sweden
- Genres: Death metal, grindcore, goregrind
- Years active: 1989–1991; 1999–present
- Label: Listenable
- Members: Erik Sahlström; Joacim Carlsson; Tobbe Sillman; Andreas Eriksson; Adde Mitroulis
- Past members: Grant McWilliams; Johan Wallin; Matti Kärki; Glenn Sykes; Mikael Von Tuominen; Mats Nordrup
- Website: generalsurgery.nu

General Surgery is a Swedish goregrind group and one of the earliest Carcass clones. Relapse Records released their 1991 debut Necrology. It was General Surgery's only material released until 2001, when the group recorded one track for the Carcass tribute album Requiems of Revulsion. General Surgery reformed in 2003 and released a split album with The County Medical Examiners. They have since released a collection of demos, two split 7-inches, a 2005 demo, a split album with Butcher ABC, and two full-length albums.

Vice stated that the band were underrated.

== Members ==
=== Current members ===
- Joacim Carlsson – guitar (1989–1990, 2007–present)
- Andreas "Adde" Mitroulis – drums, vocals (2002–present)
- Andreas Eriksson – bass, vocals (2002–2004, 2007–present)
- Erik Sahlström – vocals (2007–present)
- Urban "Ubbe" Skytt – guitar (2015–present)

=== Former members ===
- Jonas Derouche – guitar (1988–1989)
- Grant McWilliams – bass, vocals (1988–1989, 1990)
- Richard Cabeza – vocals (1988–1990, 1999–2002)
- Matti Kärki – bass, drums, vocals (1988–1990, 2000)
- Mats Nordrup – drums (1988–1990)
- Anders Jakobson – drums (1999–2000)
- Erik Thyselius – drums (2000–2001)
- Chris Barkensjö – drums (2001–2002)
- Glenn Sykes – bass (2004–2006)
- Johan Wallin – guitar, vocals (2006–2011)
- Tobias Sillman – guitar (2012–2015)

== Discography ==
=== Full length albums ===
- 2006 - Left Hand Pathology (Listenable Records)
- 2009 - Corpus In Extremis: Analysing Necrocriticism (Listenable Records)

=== EPs ===
- 1991 - Necrology (Relapse Records)
- 2012 - Like an Ever Flying Limb (Relapse Records)
- 2021 - Lay Down and Be Counted (Self-released)

=== Demos ===
- 1990 - Errosive Offals
- 1990 - Pestisferous Anthropophagia
- 1990 - Internecine Prurience
- 2005 - Demo 2005

=== Split albums ===
- 2003 - General Surgery/The County Medical Examiners (Razorback Records)
- 2003 - Relapse Singles Series Vol. 2 (Relapse Records)
- 2004 - General Surgery/Filth (Bones Brigade Records)
- 2004 - General Surgery/Machetazo (Escorbuto Recordings/Goryfied Productions)
- 2009 - General Surgery/Butcher ABC (Obliteration Records/Living Dead Society)

=== Compilation albums ===
- 2001 - Requiems of Revulsion (Necropolis Records)
- 2004 - Demos (Nuclear Abominations Records)
- 2012 - A Collection of Depravation (Relapse Records)
