= Bloodsoul =

Studio album by Fleshcrawl
- Released: 4 June 1996
- Recorded: 27 December 1995 – 6 January 1996 at The Abyss studio in Grangärde-Pärlby, Sweden
- Genre: Death metal
- Length: 35:04
- Language: English
- Label: Black Mark
- Producer: Fleshcrawl, Peter Tägtgren

Fleshcrawl chronology
Impurity (1994)	Bloodsoul (1996)	Bloodred Massacre (1997)

Professional ratings
Review scores
Source	Rating
Metal Storm	7/10 stars

Bloodsoul is the third studio album by the German death metal band Fleshcrawl. It was the last Fleshcrawl album to feature vocalist Alex Pretzer. In addition, it was the first of their albums to be recorded at The Abyss studio.

This album is typical of Fleshcrawl's mid-to-late-1990s sound, characterized by rapid speed passages, high-speed rolling double bass drum patterning, and well layered melodic guitar riffing. The general sound can be thought of as highly similar to that of other 1990s-era melodic death metal bands such as Dismember and Grave, with slight hints of Terrorizer-like grindcore/deathgrind sounds, especially in the vocals.

== Track listing ==
1. "Bloodsoul" – 5:59
2. "In the Dead of Night" – 4:19
3. "Embalmed Beauty Sleep" (Demlich cover) – 4:49
4. "Contribution Suicide" – 5:08
5. "Age of Chaos" – 4:37
6. "Recycling the Corpses" – 3:46
7. "Nocturnal Funeral" – 2:41
8. "Tomb of Memories" – 3:43

== Personnel ==
- Alex Pretzer – vocals
- Mike Hanus – guitar, bass
- Stefan Hanus – guitar
- Bastian Herzog – drums

=== Additional musician ===
- Peter Tägtgren – guest vocals on "Bloodsoul"

=== Production ===
- Produced by Fleshcrawl & Peter Tägtgren
- Recorded and mixed at The Abyss studio, Grangärde-Pärlby, Sweden, 27 December 1995 – 6 January 1996
- Engineered by Peter Tägtgren. Mixed by Fleshcrawl & Peter Tägtgren
- Mastered at Cuttingroom, Solna, Sweden
- All music and lyrics by Fleshcrawl, except "Embalmed Beauty Sleep," originally performed by Demlich
- Guest vocals by Peter Tägtgren in "Bloodsoul"
- Graphic work by Stefan Hanus with Orca Graphics & Alex Pretzer
