= In the Light of Darkness =

Studio album by Unanimated
- Released: April 27, 2009
- Recorded: Necromorbus Studio, October 2008 to January 2009
- Genre: Melodic death metal
- Length: 45:47
- Label: Regain
- Producer: Tore Stjerna, Unanimated

Unanimated chronology
Ancient God of Evil (1995)	In the Light of Darkness (2009)

Professional ratings
Review scores
Source	Rating
AllMusic	link

In the Light of Darkness is the third studio album by the Swedish melodic death metal band Unanimated. It was released on Regain, 14 years after their last release, Ancient God of Evil (which was issued on No Fashion).

== Track listing ==
In the Light of Darkness track listing
No.	Title	Lyrics	Music	Length
1.	"Ascend with the Stench of Death"		Jojje Bohlin	1:49
2.	"Retribution in Blood"	Micke Jansson	Unanimated	6:43
3.	"The Endless Beyond"	Necro & Richard Cabeza	Unanimated	5:50
4.	"Diabolic Voices"	Erik Danielsson	Unanimated	4:52
5.	"In the Light of Darkness"	Cabeza	Unanimated	4:52
6.	"The Unconquered One"	Cabeza	Unanimated	3:36
7.	"Enemy of the Sun"	Jansson	Bohlin & Cabeza	5:49
8.	"Serpent's Curse"	Jansson	Unanimated	4:44
9.	"Death to Life"	Cabeza	Unanimated	5:22
10.	"Strategia Luciferi"	Cabeza	Unanimated	2:10

== Personnel ==
=== Unanimated ===
- Micke Jansson - Vocals
- Jojje Bohlin - Lead & Rhythm Guitar
- Richard Daemon - Bass
- Peter Stjärnvind - Drums, Guitar on "Strategia Luciferi"

=== Additional musicians ===
- Erik Wallin, Sebastian Ramstedt, Set Teitan: Guest Leads

== Production ==
- Arranged By Unanimated
- Produced By Tore Stjerna & Unanimated
- Recorded, Engineered, Mixed & Mastered By Tore Stjerna
