= Corpus in Extremis: Analysing Necrocriticism =

Corpus In Extremis: Analysing Necrocriticism

Studio album by General Surgery
- Released: 12 March 2009
- Recorded: October–December 2008 at Off Beat Studio, Stockholm, Sweden
- Genre: Goregrind, death metal
- Length: 36:22
- Label: Listenable
- Producer: General Surgery

General Surgery chronology
Left Hand Pathology (2006)	Corpus In Extremis: Analysing Necrocriticism (2009)	Like an Ever Flying Limb (2012)

Corpus In Extremis: Analysing Necrocriticism is the second full-length album by Swedish goregrind/death metal band General Surgery. It was released on 12 March 2009 through Listenable Records.

Exclaim! noted in its review of the album, "The ultra low-end rumbling of ditties like opener "Necronomics" will please the diehard underground gore purist, while the (slight) musicality and structure of "Virulent Corpus Dispersement" prove that these guys actually know what they're doing."

== Track listing ==
No.	Title	Length
1.	"Necronomics"	0:46
2.	"Decedent Scarification Aesthetics"	1:47
3.	"Restrained Remains"	3:05
4.	"Final Excarnation"	1:43
5.	"Necrocriticism"	2:54
6.	"Exotoxic Septicity"	2:22
7.	"Adnexal Mass (CD) / Excessive Corpus Delicti (LP)"	0:36
8.	"Virulent Corpus Dispersement"	5:17
9.	"Ichor"	3:06
10.	"Idle Teratoma Core"	2:11
11.	"Perfunctory Fleshless Precipitate"	1:54
12.	"Plexus Necrosis"	1:48
13.	"Unwitting Donor / Cadaver Exchange"	1:27
14.	"Mortsafe Rupture"	3:24
15.	"Deadhouse"	4:02
Total length:		36:22

== Personnel ==
General Surgery

- Erik Sahlström – lead vocals
- Joacim Carlsson – guitar
- Johan Wallin – guitar, backing vocals
- Andreas Eriksson – bass guitar, backing vocals
- Adde Mitroulis – drums, backing vocals

Guest musicians

- Grant McWilliams – vocals (tracks 5, 11, 12)
- Karl Envall – vocals (tracks 9, 12)

Production

- Soile Siirtola – photography
- Anders Eriksson – engineering, mixing
- Peter in de Betou – mastering
- Andreas Eriksson – mixing
