= Unanimated =

Swedish melodic death metal band

- Origin: Stockholm, Sweden
- Genres: Melodic death metal, melodic black metal, melodic black/death
- Years active: 1988−1996, 2007–present
- Labels: Regain, Pavement Music, Crash Music Inc., No Fashion
- Members: Johan Bohlin; Richard Cabeza; Micke Broberg; Anders Schultz; Jonas Deroueche

Unanimated are a Swedish melodic death metal band from Stockholm. Their music combines Swedish death metal with black metal.

The band's 1995 album Ancient God of Evil is revered by metal musicians, including Damian Herring of Horrendous and Mikael Stanne of Dark Tranquillity.

== History ==
=== Formation and first albums (1988–1996) ===
Unanimated formed in Stockholm in 1988. Influenced by Dismember, the band developed a death metal style while incorporating melodic and black metal elements. Their debut album, In the Forest of the Dreaming Dead, was released in 1993 by Pavement Music, a label that later merged with Crash Music Inc.

In 1995, Unanimated released their second album, Ancient God of Evil, through independent Swedish label No Fashion Records. The following year, the band covered Slayer's "Dead Skin Mask" for the tribute album Slatanic Slaughter II. Unanimated disbanded in 1996. Former members joined other metal acts, including Therion, Entombed, and Dismember.

=== Reunion and later releases (2007–present) ===
Unanimated reformed in 2007 and signed with Regain Records in April 2008. Their third studio album, In the Light of Darkness, was released in April 2009.

In 2011, drummer Peter Stjärnvind left the band after 20 years and was replaced with Unleashed drummer Anders Schultz. In 2012, the band announced that they were working on new material. In 2018, Unanimated stated through their Facebook page that they had signed a three-album worldwide deal with Century Media Records. Their fourth studio album, Victory in Blood, was released in 2021.

== Band members ==
=== Current line-up ===
- Johan Bohlin – guitars (1988–1996, 2007–present)
- Richard Cabeza – vocals (1988–1991), bass (1990–1991, 1993–1996, 2007–present)
- Micke Broberg – vocals (1991–1996, 2007–present)
- Anders Schultz – drums (2011–present)
- Jonas Deroueche – guitars (2016–present)

=== Former members ===
- Tim Strandberg – bass (1988–1990)
- Peter Stjärnvind – drums (1988–1996, 2007–2011)
- Chris Alvarez – guitars (1988–1990)
- Jonas Mellberg – guitars (1991–1996)
- Daniel Lofthagen – bass (1993)
- Jocke Westman – keyboards (live 1993)

== Discography ==
Studio albums

- In the Forest of the Dreaming Dead (1993)
- Ancient God of Evil (1995)
- In the Light of Darkness (2009)
- Victory in Blood (2021)

EPs

- Annihilation (2018)

Demos

- Rehearsal Demo 1990 (1990)
- Fire Storm (1991)
