= Afflicted (band) =

Swedish metal band

- Origin: Sweden
- Genres: Technical death metal; power metal (later)
- Years active: 1988–1995
- Labels: Nuclear Blast; Massacre
- Members: Michael Van Der Graaf; Jesper Thorsson; Joacim Carlsson; Philip Von Segebaden; Yasin Hillborg
- Past members: Joakim Bröms

Afflicted was a technical death metal band from Sweden, active in the early 1990s. They were part of the Swedish death metal scene, though overshadowed by better-known bands like Entombed, Dismember, and Tiamat.

== History ==
The band was formed in Stockholm on the basis of the defunct band Defiance. They were known as Afflicted Convulsion from 1988 to 1990. Their first demo, Beyond Redemption, came in 1990, followed by their first single, "Ingrained," the same year. The single "Wanderland" from 1992 was released on Relapse Records. The band signed a record deal with Nuclear Blast and released their first album, Prodigal Sun, also in 1992. Later, the band abandoned death metal for a more melodic style, changing its singer from Joakim Bröms to Michael Van Der Graaf. The change in style to power metal was evident since 1994, when Afflicted appeared on the Nuclear Blast compilation Summer Blast 1994. This was before HammerFall revived power metal in Sweden. The band quit around the same time as releasing Dawn of Glory in 1995.

Swedish newspaper Expressen rated Prodigal Sun 3 out of 5. While the album was "worthy of buying", the reviewer advised to avoid the "first edition, whose mix is catastrophal". Dawn Of Glory could only muster a one-star review from Aftonbladet: "Here, honour, vikings and battle is the order of the day, when the Swedes peel off as good as all death metal, and revert to the eighties' metal. Unfortunately, Afflicted mix the worst from both styles, and the result is thin and lame, even sonically. In addition, I miss the essential twinkle in the eye". In another negative review, Death Metal Underground noted that "This is not metal all. This is rock n’ roll. This, sounds like an attempt at commercialization." Both albums were also reviewed by Rock Hard.

When Metal Mind Productions re-released Prodigal Sun in 2008, a reviewer for Teeth of the Divine noted that the band had been overlooked in its time. "Prodigal Sun (1992) contained eleven mind-blowing tracks, ranging from slow-paced death metal monsters to fast, thrash-influenced bulldozers". While being "extremely heavy", the album also featured "complex structure" with unusual musical references such as "Arabic folk music". According to Death Metal Underground, the intro and subsequent melodies on the album took the listener to "an ancient Egyptian landscape".

Drummer Yasin Hillborg worked several years on a documentary about metal music, Så jävla metal, which premiered in 2011. Philip Von Segebaden started the project Defender, which released an album in 1999. He had also played in Cranium.

== Members ==
- Michael Van Der Graaf - vocals
- Jesper Thorsson - guitar
- Joacim Carlsson - guitar
- Philip Von Segebaden - bass
- Yasin Hillborg - drums

== Discography ==
- Beyond Redemption (demo, 1990, as Afflicted Convulsion)
- "Ingrained" (single, 1990)
- "Rising to the Sun" (single, 1992)
- "Wanderland" (single, Relapse Records, 1992)
- Prodigal Sun (Nuclear Blast, 1992)
- Dawn of Glory (Massacre Records, 1995)
- Beyond Redemption (demos compilation, Century Media Records, 2023)
