= Scratch and sniff =

Odor technology

Scratch and sniff technology is the application of a fragrant coating to items such as stickers or paperboard, so that when the coating is scratched it releases an odor that is normally related to the image displayed under the coating. The technology has been used on a variety of surfaces from stickers to compact discs. Gale W. Matson accidentally invented the technology while working for 3M in the 1960s. He was attempting to create a new method for making carbonless copy paper using microencapsulation. The technology to infuse microcapsules and paper was submitted to the US patent office on November 18, 1969, and the patent was granted on June 23, 1970. Despite the technology being invented by Matson in the 1960s and its subsequent success in the 1970s, the first patent for a translucent fragrance releasing version of microcapsules wasn't issued until January 15, 1985, to the 3M corporation.

== Use ==
One of the earliest uses of scratch-and-sniff technology can be found in the 1971 children's book "Little Bunny Follows His Nose," which features various smellable objects such as peaches, roses, and pine needles. Stickers and labels became popular in the late 1970s, and remained so through to the mid-1980s. In 1977, Creative Teaching Press produced some of the earliest scratch and sniff stickers, primarily marketing them to teachers as rewards for their students.

Scratch-and-sniff stickers are occasionally used to help diagnose anosmia, though the Alcohol Sniff Test, which uses vaporised 70% isopropyl alcohol, is far more common. Some utility companies enclosed scratch and sniff cards in their bills to educate the public in recognizing the smell of a methane gas leak. In 1987, cards distributed by the Baltimore Gas and Electric Company led to a rash of false alarms when the scents of cards in unopened envelopes were mistaken for real gas leaks.

== Production ==
Scratch and sniff is created through the process of micro-encapsulation. The desired smell is surrounded by micro-capsules that break easily when gently rubbed. The rub to release action breaks the micro-encapsulated bubbles and releases the aroma. Because of the micro-encapsulation, the aroma can be preserved for extremely long periods of time.

While there were hundreds of companies that put out Scratch and Sniff stickers, the most well known are the originators Creative Teaching Press (CTP) (who later renamed them Sniffy's in 1980/1981), Trend Enterprise's Stinky Stickers line (which followed directly after CTP), Hallmark, Sandylion, Spindex, Gordy, and Mello Smello.

== In popular culture ==
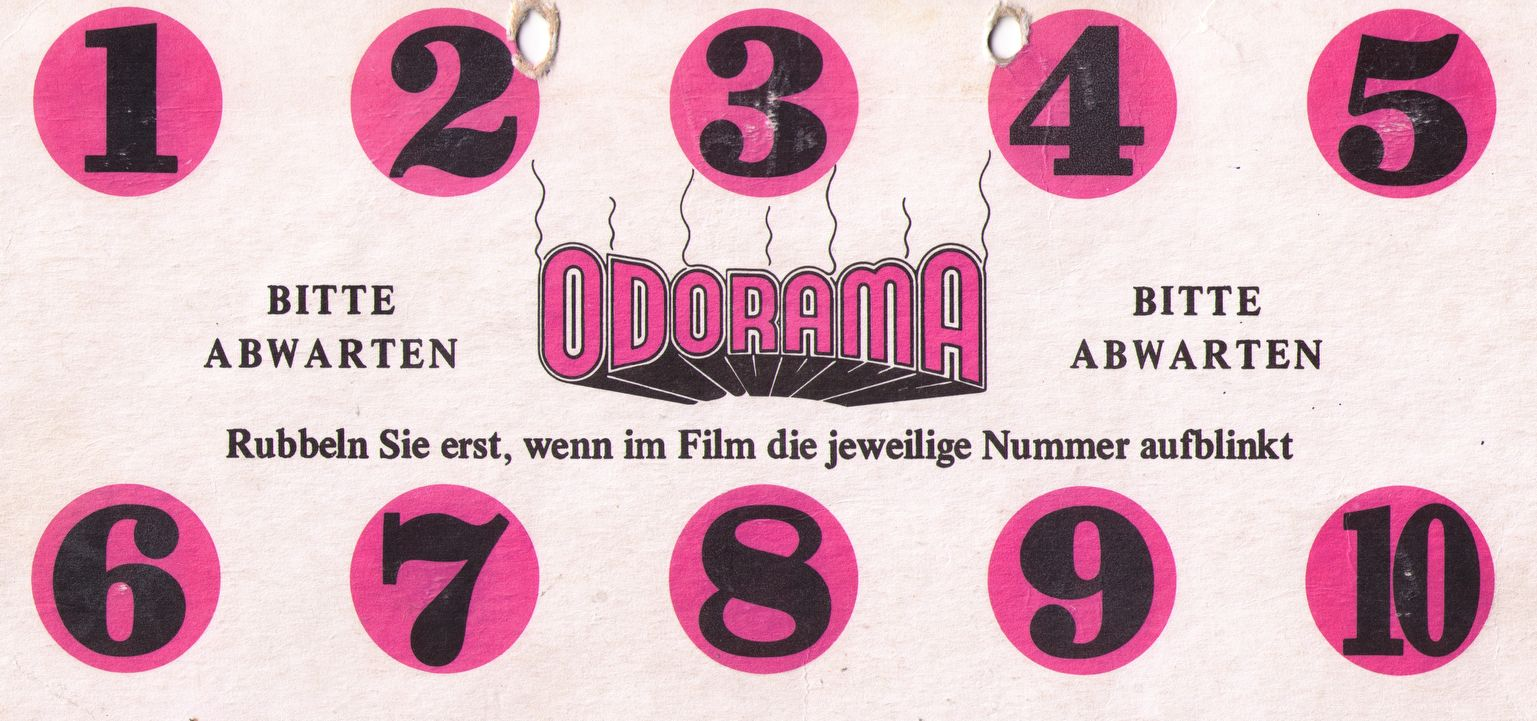
German scratch and sniff card from the film Polyester

Apart from the stickers, scratch and sniff surfaces are to be found on some objects in popular culture:

- The 1972 Capitol debut record album by The Raspberries featured a raspberry scratch and sniff sticker on its cover.
- Gran Turismo 2 and FIFA 2001 featured a scratch and sniff disc.
- Leisure Suit Larry: Love for Sail! featured a scratch and sniff card – the CyberSniff 2000 – which had nine different scents. The game would flash a coloured square with a number in it up at points during the game for the player to smell the corresponding square on the card.
- For the original release of the game Snatcher, Japanese videogame producer Hideo Kojima had planned to have floppy disks painted over with heat-sensitive iron-smelling paint, though the idea was immediately dropped by the rest of the staff. After 15 minutes of play, the disc would have heated up and released a smell akin to a "murder scene" or blood as the paint melted off. As well, it would have revealed a message underneath, a hint to one of the game's puzzles.
- The vinyl cover of Dandelion Gum, an album by Black Moth Super Rainbow, has a scratch and sniff surface.
- The Player's Guide packaged with the 1995 Super NES video game EarthBound included six scratch and sniff cards. One contained a mystery scent; if the player guessed the smell and sent in the card to Nintendo, they would receive a prize. The scent turned out to be pizza.
- The 1986 Infocom interactive fiction game Leather Goddesses of Phobos came with a scratch and sniff card, as part of the game's feelies.
- The 1981 movie Polyester, directed, produced, and written by John Waters, was released featuring a gimmick called "Odorama", whereby viewers could smell what they saw on screen through scratch and sniff cards. The Odorama gimmick was also used for the 2009 Sydney Underground Film Festival screening of Water's 1972 cult classic Pink Flamingos. Several other movies had used this idea, such as Rugrats Go Wild and Spy Kids: All the Time in the World, the latter had to rubbed instead of scratched. In 2011 Midnight Movies reproduced Polyester 'Odorama' for the Edinburgh Film Festival using replica scratch and sniff cards with the original 10 aromas used in the 1981 movie.
- Little Golden Books in the 1980s offered a series of scratch and sniff books called Little Golden Sniff It Books. Titles included What! No Spinach?: A Popeye Story, The Hedgehogs' Christmas Tree, Walt Disney's Donald Duck in Where's Grandma?, and The Mouse Family's New Home.
- The band Mae released a limited edition CD during their US tour with a scratch and sniff surface. It was scented like the ocean and the crowd was encouraged to smell the discs during their song "The Ocean".
- Katy Perry made her album Teenage Dream [Deluxe Edition] smell like cotton candy through scratch and sniff technology.
- In the Pushing Daisies episode "The Smell of Success", olfactory scientist Napoleon LeNez has written a scratch and sniff book for using odours to bring success in the life of the reader. The protagonists investigate a murderous attempt to sabotage his book launch.
- Goregrind band The County Medical Examiners's 2007 debut album, Olidous Operettas, had a scratch and sniff CD face that, according to vocalist/guitarist Dr. Fairbanks, "will smell like rotten meat".
- Hustler Magazine's August 1977 issue had a Scratch 'n' Sniff centerfold.
- The film Mr. Magorium's Wonder Emporium was promoted in the Los Angeles Times using scratch and sniff advertisement with a frosted cake smell.
- London New Year Celebrations 2013
- DC Comics published a scratch-and-sniff-themed Annual issue of Harley Quinn in 2014.
- Marina and the Diamonds made a 6 vinyl disc pack for her album Froot that each contained a scratch and sniff surface on the sleeves.
- King Gizzard & the Lizard Wizard included a banana-scented scratch-and-sniff sticker on their album Flying Microtonal Banana.
- When annotating the 1963 Jean Lewis release of the Tortoise and the Hare, Gregory I. Carlson joked that although the book was fuzzy, it was "not scratch-and-sniff!"
- In 2024, the French postal service issued a postage stamp depicting baguettes along with scratch and sniff containing their fragrance.
- In the Carl the Collector episode The Sticker Collection, Carl's favorite scratch-and-sniff sticker, a pickle-scented one, has lost its smell. He and his friends, Sheldon and Forrest, try to fix it by bathing it in spices, and even submerging it in a jar containing pickles, both of which do nothing but destroy the sticker. Sheldon gifts Carl a popcorn-scented sticker as a replacement.
