= Necrology (EP) =

EP by General Surgery
- Released: November 4, 1991
- Recorded: November 1990 at Sunlight Studios
- Genres: Goregrind, death metal
- Length: 15:35
- Label: Relapse
- Producers: Joacim Carlsson, Tomas Skogsberg

General Surgery chronology
Necrology (1991)	Left Hand Pathology (2006)

Professional ratings
Review scores
Source	Rating
Allmusic	link

Necrology is an EP by Swedish goregrind band General Surgery. The first press, released as 7" vinyl, includes only the first 5 tracks.

Re-released in 1993 by Nuclear Blast as cd in a "poster bag" format with a poster holding the lyrics on one side and the cover art on the other. Includes a sticker. Underground Series limited to 2,000 copies. It came with two bonus tracks.

Reissued and re-mastered in 2011 with different (orange colored) artwork, the bonus tracks from the 1993 re-release, and the following bonus tracks from the 1990 demo Pestisferous Anthropophagia. AllMusic said it "still sounds like what it is: a basement recording by a band possessed of more enthusiasm than instrumental skill."

The song "The Succulent Aftermath of a Subdural Hemorrhage" appears on the compilation 5 Years Nuclear Blast, 1993.

== Track listing ==
No.	Title	Length
1.	"Ominous Lamentation"	3:11
2.	"Slithering Maceration of Ulcerous Facial Tissue"	1:12
3.	"Grotesque Laceration of Mortified Flesh"	1:30
4.	"Severe Catatonia in Pathology"	2:59
5.	"Crimson Concerto"	3:29
6.	"The Succulent Aftermath of a Subdural Hemorrhage" (1993 Re-released bonus track)	2:44
7.	"An Orgy of Flying Limbs and Gore" (1993 Re-released bonus track)	0:30
Total length:		15:35

2011 Remastered Edition
No.	Title	Length
8.	"Slithering Maceration of Ulcerous Facial Tissue" (Pestisferous Anthropophagia demo)	1:17
9.	"The Succulent Aftermath of a Subdural Haemmorhage" (Pestisferous Anthropophagia demo)	2:47
10.	"Grotesque Laceration of Mortified Flesh" (Pestisferous Anthropophagia demo)	1:36

== Personnel ==
General Surgery

- Grant McWilliams – Vocals
- Joachim "Jocke" Carlsson – Guitars
- Mats Nordrup – Drums
- Matti Kärki – Bass, vocals

Production

- Matthew F. Jacobson – Executive producer
- Jacob Speis – Layout
- Scott Hull – Remastering
- Gottfrid Jarnefors – Photography
- Dangerous Dave Shirk – Mastering
- Joacim Carlsson – Producer
- Tomas Skogsberg – Producer, Engineering
- William J. Yurkiewicz Jr. – Executive producer
