= Dismember (album) =

Studio album by Dismember
- Released: 18 February 2008
- Recorded: Late 2007
- Studio: Studio B.A.S
- Genre: Death metal
- Length: 42:36
- Label: Regain Records

Dismember chronology
| The God That Never Was (2006) | Dismember (2008) |

Professional ratings
Review scores
| Source | Rating |
|---|---|
| About.com | 4/5 stars |
| AllMusic | 3/5 stars |
| Blabbermouth | 8/10 stars |
| Rock Hard | 8.5/10 stars |
| Metal.de | 8/10 stars |
| Ox-Fanzine | 8/10 stars |
| Noise.fi | 3/5 stars |
| Powermetal.de | |

Dismember (also known by members as the Untitled album) is the eighth studio album by death metal band Dismember. It was released 18 February 2008 by Regain Records, and was their last studio album before an eight-year hiatus from recording and performing. A promotional copy of this album was leaked onto file sharing networks in early 2008.

== Track listing ==
| No. | Title | Length |
|---|---|---|
| 1. | "Death Conquers All" | 3:48 |
| 2. | "Europa Burns" | 3:33 |
| 3. | "Under a Blood Red Sky" | 5:24 |
| 4. | "The Hills Have Eyes" | 3:15 |
| 5. | "Legion" | 3:22 |
| 6. | "Tide of Blood" | 3:35 |
| 7. | "Combat Fatigue" | 2:29 |
| 8. | "No Honor in Death" | 3:07 |
| 9. | "To End It All" | 3:51 |
| 10. | "Dark Depths" | 3:48 |
| 11. | "Black Sun" | 6:24 |
| Total length: | | 42:36 |

== Personnel ==
=== Dismember ===
- Matti Kärki – vocals
- David Blomqvist – guitars
- Martin Persson – guitars
- Tobias Cristiansson – bass
- Thomas Daun – drums

=== Production ===
- Nico Elgstrand – mixing, recording
- Craig Rogers – cover art
- Soren Von Malmborg – mastering
