= Scott Carlson =

American musician

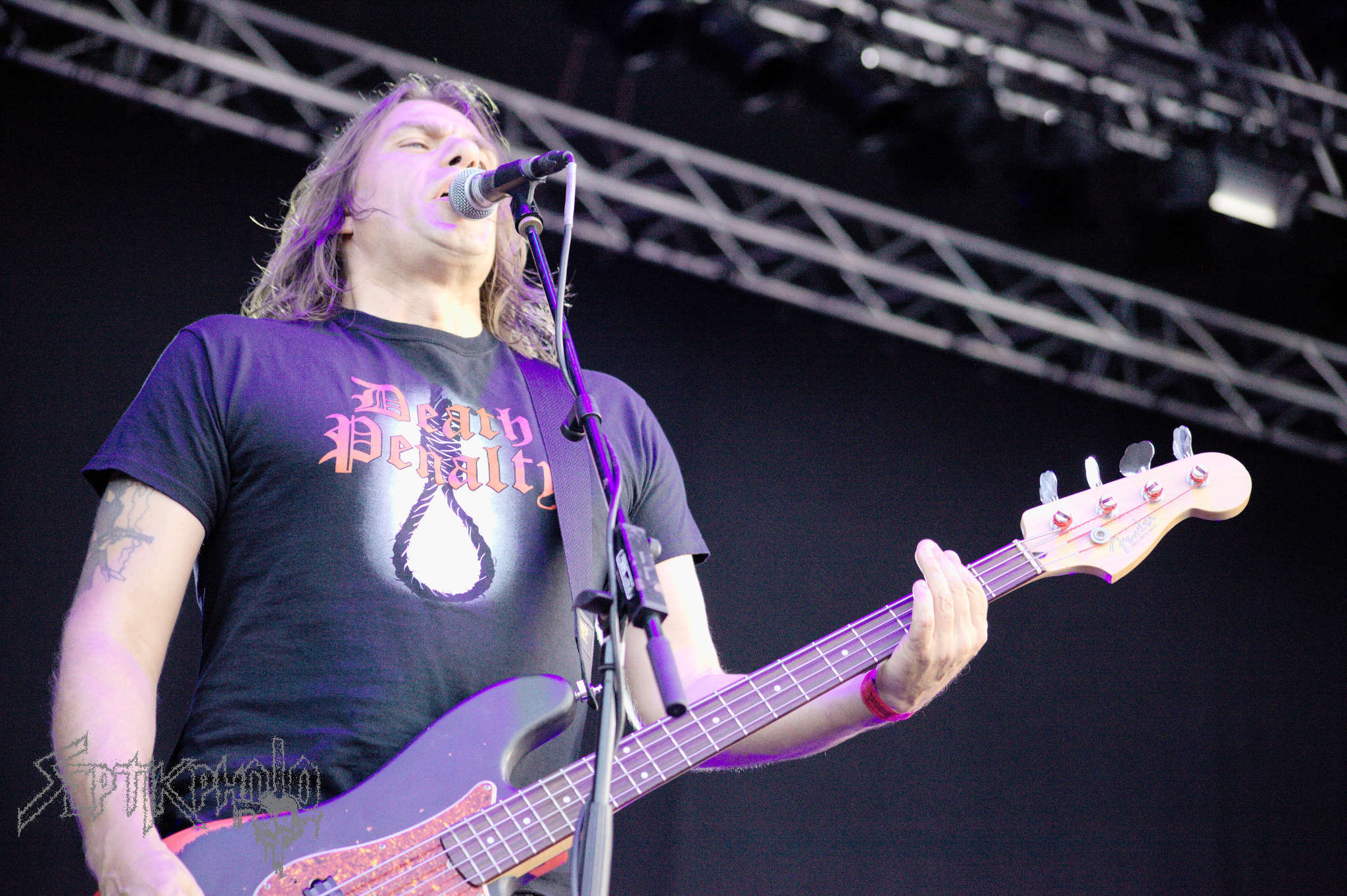
- Carson in 2014

Background information
- Born: Flint, Michigan, U.S.
- Genres: Grindcore; death metal; doom metal; hardcore punk; garage rock
- Occupation: Musician
- Instruments: Vocals, bass, guitar
- Years active: 1984–present
- Labels: Southern Lord; Necrosis; Earache; Black Lodge; Relapse; Sound Pollution; Rise Above; Metal Blade
- Member of: Repulsion, Septic Tank
- Formerly of: Death, Cathedral, Church of Misery

Scott Carlson is an American musician, who most notably worked as the lead vocalist and bassist of pioneering grindcore band Repulsion. Additionally, he was briefly the bassist and one of the vocalists of pioneering death metal band Death, as well as bassist of doom metal band Cathedral, bassist and vocalist of Swedish death metal band Death Breath, vocalist of Japanese doom metal band Church of Misery, bassist of hardcore punk band Septic Tank, guitarist of garage rock band The Superbees and guitarist of From Beyond.

== Biography ==
=== Repulsion, Death, Cathedral, Hushdrops (1984–1997) ===
In 1984, Carlson and friend Matt Olivo formed the band Tempter, along with original drummer James Auten, through their shared love of heavy metal bands Hellhammer, Venom, Metallica and Slayer, as well as punk rock bands like Discharge. Not soon after, the band began recording demos and tape traded with other music fans all over the world. One such tape trader was Florida's Chuck Schuldiner, who in 1985 asked Carlson if he would like to join his own band Death. Carlson accepted under the condition that Olivo would be the band's rhythm guitarist. Carlson and Olivo then moved to Florida to join Schuldiner. They put their own band, which had changed its name multiple times before settling on the name Repulsion, on hold. Repulsion at this point consisted of the two and drummer Phill Hines. However, not soon after, then-Death drummer Kam Lee departed from the band due to creative differences between him and Schuldiner over control of vocal duties. A short time afterwards, Olivo and Carlson moved back to Michigan and reformed Repulsion, along with Dave 'Grave' Hollingshead, who had recently been arrested for grave robbing, where they recorded their debut album Horrified, along with new guitarist Aaron Freeman. However, not soon after, Repulsion broke up again, when Olivo joined the army. Carlson then join Cathedral briefly, as a touring musician, in 1995. From late 1995-mid 1998, Carlson played bass for Chicago trio Hushdrops, both live and on several recordings.

=== Superbees, Death Breath, Septic Tank and Church of Misery (1998–present) ===
In 1998, Carlson joined Los Angeles garage rock band Superbees as guitarist, they recorded one full-length album, High Volume, in 2002 and were influenced by Iggy Pop and the MC5. Repulsion then reformed in 2003, making an appearance at Milwaukee Metalfest.

In 2005, Nicke Andersson proposed the idea of working together to Carlson, of which he accepted. This project would end up coming into fruition in the form of Death Breath, of which Carlson originally only did guest vocals on a few tracks on their album Stinking Up the Night and EP Let It Stink, however became an official member after the departure of Mange Hedquist, the band's bassist.

In 2011, Carlson joined Cathedral once again, this time as an official member, and playing on their tenth and final album The Last Spire. However, from Cathedral's ashes, every one of its final members formed the hardcore punk band Septic Tank, who were heavily influenced by Discharge and Siege, releasing an EP in 2013 and then a full-length album in 2018. Carlson also recorded vocals on Japanese doom metal band Church of Misery's 2016 album "And Then There Were Nothing...", however, departed not soon after as bassist, Tatsu Mikami, wished to put together a different unit for touring.

== Discography ==
=== With Repulsion ===
Albums

- Horrified (1989)

Singles

- Excruciation (1991)

Demos

- Rehearsal Tape (1984)
- Stench of Burning Death (1984)
- Violent Death (1985)
- WFBE (1986)
- Slaughter of the Innocent (1986)
- Rebirth (1991)
- Final Demo (1991)

Splits

- Relapse Singles Series Vol. 3 (2004)

=== With Superbees ===
- High Volume (2002)

=== With Death Breath ===
Albums

- Stinking Up the Night (2006)

EPs

- Let It Stink (2007)

=== With Cathedral ===
- The Last Spire (2013)

=== With Septic Tank ===
Albums

- Rotting Civilisation (2018)

EPs

- Septic Tank (2013)

=== With Church of Misery ===
- And Then There Were None... (2016)
