= Robert Pehrsson =

Swedish guitarist, singer & song writer (born 1975)

- Born: December 13, 1975 (age 50)
- Genres: Rock, hard rock, power pop, heavy metal, death metal
- Occupations: Musician, songwriter, web designer
- Instruments: Vocals, guitar, songwriter
- Labels: Relapse Records, Razzia Records, Black Lodge Records, High Roller Records
- Website: Robert Pehrsson's Humbucker

Robert Pehrsson (born December 13, 1975) is a Swedish guitarist, singer and songwriter. He has worked for such diverse bands such as Runemagick, Thunder Express, Death Breath, Dundertåget, Imperial State Electric, Slingblade and Dagger. Robert Pehrsson started his career as a guitarist/vocalist around 88–89, then concentrating mainly on playing extreme music like thrash and early death metal, but soon branched out in different musical genres but mainly focusing on rock music.

Pehrsson has now completed his first solo album for High Roller Records containing songs such as the guitar-driven "Haunt My Mind", "Who Else Is on Your Mind" or the soft rockin' "Can't Change".

Recorded at Gutterview Recorders, the nine songs feature guest spots by well-known musicians such as Nicke Andersson, Dolf De Borst and Tomas Eriksson from Imperial State Electric, Peter Stjärnvind (Nifelheim, Entombed), Joseph Tholl (Enforcer, Black Trip), Robert Eriksson (ex The Hellacopters), Olle Dahlstedt (Entombed), Johan Bäckman (Necrocourse) and Johannes Borgström.

== Musical equipment ==
Guitars

- Gibson Flying V
- Gibson SG
- Gibson Les Paul Sunburst
- Gibson Les Paul Tobacco Burst
- Greco Les Paul Tobacco Burst
- Fender Telecaster

Effects

- BOSS TU-2 Tuner
- Dunlop Cry Baby
- Dunlop Rotovibe
- MXR Bass Octave Deluxe
- Fulltone Fat-Boost
- Electro Harmonix LPB-1
- MXR Micro Amp
- Custom built Tube screamer
- MXR Phase 90
- MXR Flanger
- MXR Analog Delay
- Custom built Echo Delay

Amps & Cabinets

- Marshall JMP100 Head
- Vox AC30
- Orange 4x12 Cabinet
- Malmberg 4x12 Cabinet
- Custom 2x12 Cabinet

== Discography ==
- 1996 – Deathwitch – Triumphant Devastation
- 1997 – Deathwitch – Dawn of Armageddon
- 1999 – Tomahawk – What to Do 7"
- 1999 – Tomahawk – Push 7"
- 2002 – Wrecks – Wrecks
- 2004 – Thunder Express – We Play for Pleasure
- 2006 – Death Breath – Death Breath
- 2006 – Death Breath – Stinking Up the Night
- 2007 – Thunder Express – Republic Disgrace
- 2007 – Death Breath – Let It Stink
- 2009 – Dundertåget – Skaffa ny frisyr
- 2010 – Dundertåget – Dom feta åren är förbi
- 2010 – Imperial State Electric – Imperial State Electric
- 2012 – Imperial State Electric – Pop War
- 2013 – Robert Pehrsson's Humbucker – S/T (Solo album)
- 2013 – Imperial State Electric – Reptile Brain Music
- TBA – Death Breath – TBA
- 2015 - Imperial State Electric - Honk Machine
- 2016 - Robert Pehrsson's Humbucker - Long Way To The Light
- 2019 - Robert Pehrsson's Humbucker - Out Of The Dark

== Appearing on ==
- 2009 – Mary's Kids – S/T
- 2010 – Necronaut – S/T
- 2011 – 77 – High Decibels
- 2011 – Slingblade – The Unpredicted Deeds of Molly Black
- 2012 – The Datsuns – Death Rattle Boogie
- 2012 – Bullet – Full Pull
- 2012 – Mary's Kids – Say No!
- 2013 – Black Trip – Goin' Under
- 2013 – Dead Lord – Goodbye Repentance
- 2013 – Dregen – S/T
- 2013 - Black Trip - Goin' Under
- 2015 - Black Trip - Shadowline

== Bands ==
- Masticator
- Runemagick
- Deathwitch
- Tomahawk
- The Preachermen
- Wrecks
- Thunder Express/Dundertåget
- Death Breath
- Imperial State Electric
- Dagger
- Robert Pehrsson's Humbucker
