= Dundertåget =

Swedish rock band

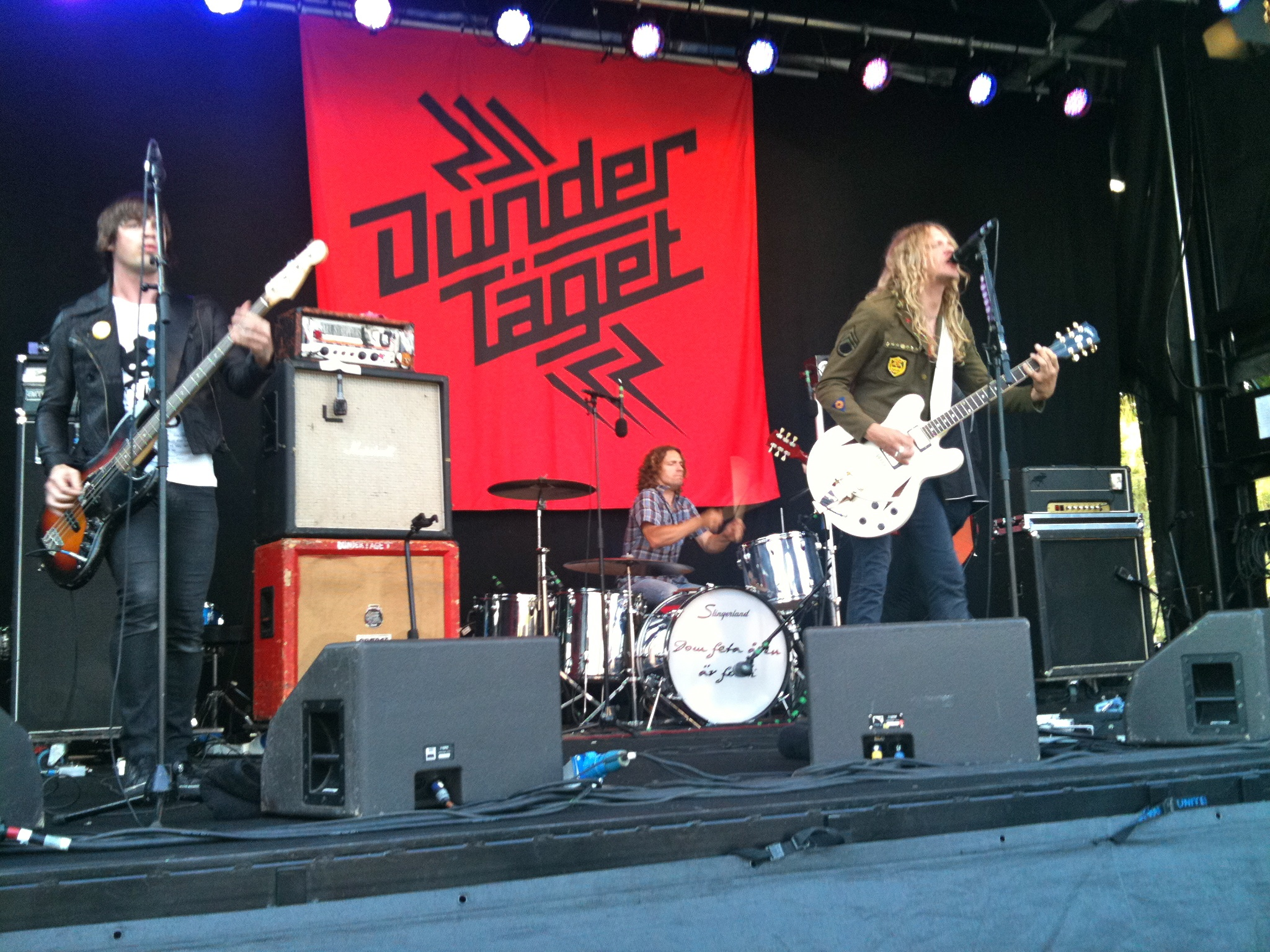
- Dundertåget in 2010

Background information
- Also known as: Thunder Express
- Origin: Stockholm, Sweden
- Genres: Rock, garage rock, hard rock, blues rock, power pop
- Years active: 2004 – 2011
- Label: Razzia Records
- Past members: Robert Dahlqvist; Robert Pehrsson; Jens Lagergren; Jesper Karlsson
- Website: Dundertåget.se

Dundertåget, originally known as Thunder Express, was a Swedish rock band formed in 2004 by Robert Dahlqvist. They released four albums before disbanding in 2011.

== History ==
The band was formed by Dahlqvist in 2004 as a side project to highlight his lead guitar and lead vocal skills, and for performing when his full-time band The Hellacopters were on break. The band was originally named Thunder Express, after a song by MC5. They were influenced by that band plus The Rolling Stones, Cheap Trick, The Faces, and ZZ Top. The band also included guitarist Robert Pehrsson, bassist Jens Lagergren, and drummer Jesper Karlsson.

Originally performing in English, Thunder Express released the albums We Play for Pleasure in 2004 and Republic Disgrace in 2007. In 2008 they decided to switch to their native Swedish for titles and lyrics, and changed their name to Dundertåget (a rough translation of "Thunder Express").

Under their new name they released the album Skaffa ny Frisyr in 2009, which earned the band a Grammis nomination for Best Rock Act of the Year. Their fourth overall album Dom Feta Åren är Förbi was released in 2010, featuring a guest appearance by singer Nina Ramsby. Dundertåget disbanded in 2011, with Dahlqvist and Pehrsson moving to other projects associated with The Hellacopters. Dahlqvist also released some solo material shortly before his death in 2017.

== Members ==
- Robert Dahlqvist – lead vocals, lead guitar
- Robert Pehrsson – rhythm guitar, backing vocals
- Jens Lagergren – bass, backing vocals
- Jesper Karlsson – drums, percussion

== Discography ==
=== as Thunder Express ===
- We Play for Pleasure (2004)
- Republic Disgrace (2007)

=== as Dundertåget ===
- Skaffa ny Frisyr (2009)
- Dom Feta Åren är Förbi (2010)

== See also ==
- List of The Hellacopters members projects
