= Olidous Operettas =

Studio album by The County Medical Examiners
- Released: 2007
- Recorded: 2006
- Genre: Goregrind
- Length: 29:54
- Label: Relapse
- Producer: The County Medical Examiners

The County Medical Examiners chronology
Reeking Rhapsodies for Chorale, Percussion, and Strings (EP) (2004)	Olidous Operettas (2007)

Olidous Operettas is the second full-length album from The County Medical Examiners, as well as their first on Relapse Records. This is also the first album in the history of Relapse Records to feature a "scratch-n-sniff" CD face. According to the liner notes the odor of "corpse reek" on the CD face was donated by John Doe #4502.

== Track listing ==
No.	Title	Length
1.	"Casper's Dictum"	4:11
2.	"Morgagnic Anatomics"	4:13
3.	"Necrotic Apologues"	4:15
4.	"Blunt Force Flight"	4:18
5.	"The Virchow Postmortem Procedure"	3:51
6.	"Expeditious Evisceratory Mishap"	1:54
7.	"Maturating Decompositional Gas"	3:37
8.	"Kaleidoscopic Malacia"	3:31
9.	"Decomp-Aerosol Perfume Excrete" (Japanese bonus track)

== Personnel ==
- Dr. Morton Fairbanks - guitars, vocals
- Dr. Guy Radcliffe - bass, vocals
- Dr. Jack Putnam - drums, vocals

== Production ==
- Arranged & Produced By The County Medical Examiners
- Recorded, Engineered & Mixed By Matthew Widener
