= Where Ironcrosses Grow =

Studio album by Dismember
- Released: July 27, 2004
- Genre: Death metal
- Length: 38:14
- Label: Karmageddon Media

Dismember chronology
Hate Campaign (2000)	Where Ironcrosses Grow (2004)	The God That Never Was (2006)

Professional ratings
Review scores
Source	Rating
Allmusic	3/5 stars
Noise.fi	3/5 stars
Scream Magazine	4/6 stars
Metal.de	8/10 stars
Rock Hard	8/10 stars

Where Ironcrosses Grow is the sixth album by Swedish death metal band Dismember.

== Track listing ==
No.	Title	Length
1.	"Where Ironcrosses Grow"	2:35
2.	"Forged with Hate"	2:55
3.	"Me-God"	4:20
4.	"Tragedy of the Faithful"	3:47
5.	"Chasing the Serpent"	4:13
6.	"Where Angels Fear to Tread"	4:43
7.	"Sword of Light"	3:24
8.	"As the Coins upon Your Eyes"	3:30
9.	"Children of the Cross"	5:08
10.	"As I Pull the Trigger"	3:38
Total length:		38:14
