= Dismemberment (illusion) =

1935 stage illusion by Edward Massey

Dismemberment is a stage illusion, designed and patented by the magician Edward M. Massey in 1935.

== Basic Effect ==
The illusion, as described in Massey's patent, involves a large torus—or doughnut-shaped—apparatus. Placed on edge to face the audience, the assistant's head extends from one side of the ring and feet on the opposite, meaning the assistant's torso is visible traversing across the center of the ring. The torus is then rotated, which seems to rotate along with the person's head and feet (as they would if attached to the outside of the ring)—but while the torso remains stationary in its original horizontal position. This seems to suggest that the assistant has been "dissociated" into three separate portions.

== Exposure ==
The Masked Magician (Val Valentino) performed the Dismemberment and revealed the method in Breaking the Magician's Code: Magic's Biggest Secrets Finally Revealed (2008).
