= Impurity (Fleshcrawl album) =

Studio album by Fleshcrawl
- Released: 31 May 1994
- Recorded: December 1993 at Unisound Studio in Finspang, Sweden
- Genre: Death metal
- Length: 34:48
- Language: English
- Label: Black Mark
- Producers: Fleshcrawl, Dan Swanö

Fleshcrawl chronology
Descend into the Absurd (1992)	Impurity (1994)	Bloodsoul (1996)

Professional ratings
Review scores
Source	Rating
Metal Storm	link

Impurity is the second studio album by the German death metal band Fleshcrawl. It was their first album to feature guitarist Mike Hanus, brother of founding member Stefan Hanus and last to feature founding bass guitarist Markus Amann, and it is the only Fleshcrawl album thus far that does not bear the "carved-in-flesh" Fleshcrawl logo.

This album is different from the preceding Descend into the Absurd in that it is somewhat more melodic and musically organized, thus making it closer to the Swedish subgenre of death metal in relation than their earlier releases, which carry a more generic death metal sound. As is typical of their mid-1990s albums, and of mid-1990s Swedish/melodic death metal in general, Impurity is characterized by rapid bass drum rolls that alternate with slower, more intense patterns, particularly to counter the mid-to-high tempo guitar riffs. However, the sound of this album is unique among similar bands of the same time in that the drums are toned somewhat higher than usual, resulting in a "tinny" sound not unlike that of many mid-1990s black metal bands.

The major lyrical themes of this album are consistent with their previous releases, and tend to focus on grim, dark subjects, as is common in death metal, such as evil, death, slavery to dark forces ("Subordinate"), sacrifice ("Center of Hate"), and homicide and genocide ("Incineration").

== Track listing ==
1. "From the Dead to the Living" – 02:33
2. "Withering Life" – 02:37
3. "Reincarnation" (Demigod cover) – 04:42
4. "Subordinate" – 03:35
5. "Disfigured" – 02:17
6. "After Obliteration" – 01:12 (instrumental)
7. "Stiffen Souls" – 03:36
8. "Center of Hate" – 03:59
9. "Inevitable End" – 04:29
10. "Incineration" – 05:48

== Personnel ==
- Alex Pretzer – vocals
- Mike Hanus – guitar
- Stefan Hanus – gitar
- Markus Amann – bass
- Bastian Herzog – drums

=== Additional personnel ===
- Rickard Alriksson – backing vocals on "Disfigured"
- Dan Swanö – backing vocals on "Incineration" and keyboards on "After Obliteration & "Incineration"

=== Production ===
- Produced by Fleshcrawl & Dan Swanö
- Recorded and mixed at Unisound Studio in Finspång, Sweden, December 1993
- Engineered by Dan Swanö. Mixed by Fleshcrawl & Dan Swanö
- All music & lyrics by Fleshcrawl, except "Reincarnation" by Demigod (Laitinen/Linden/Parviainen/Taatila) and "After Obliteration" by Dan Swanö
- Cover photo by Getha Weeber, all other pics by Claudia Eckhard, Günter Hellwig and Christina Weikmann. Graphic work by Stefan Hanus, Alex Pretzer, Manfred & Nina Ottow.
