= Soulskinner =

Studio album by Fleshcrawl
- Released: 15 January 2002
- Recorded: 17 September – 2 October 2001 at Studio Underground in Västerås, Sweden
- Genre: Death metal
- Length: 43:26
- Language: English
- Label: Metal Blade
- Producer: Fleshcrawl

Fleshcrawl chronology
As Blood Rains from the Sky... We Walk the Path of Endless Fire (2000)	Soulskinner (2002)	Made of Flesh (2004)

Soulskinner is the sixth studio album by the German death metal band Fleshcrawl. The last to feature founding guitarist Stefan Hanus.

== Track listing ==
1. "Soulskinner" – 3:48
2. "Dying Blood" – 6:32
3. "Carved in Flesh" – 4:27
4. "Breeding the Dead" – 3:09
5. "The Forthcoming End" – 5:17
6. "Deathvastation" – 4:02
7. "Legions of Hatred" – 4:04
8. "Forced to Kill" – 3:56
9. "Rotten" – 4:43
10. "Metal Gods" (Judas Priest cover) – 3:33

== Line up ==
- Sven Gross – vocals
- Tobias Schick – bass
- Stefan Hanus – guitar
- Mike Hanus – guitar
- Bastian Herzog – drums

=== Production ===
- Produced by Fleshcrawl
- Recorded and mixed at Studio Underground, Västerås, Sweden, 17 September – 2 October 2001
- Engineered by Pelle Saether and Lars Linden
- Mixed by Pelle Saether & Fleshcrawl
- Mastered by Achim Köhler at Indiscreet-Audio, Hohengehren, Germany.
- All music and lyrics by Fleshcrawl, except "Metal Gods", originally by Judas Priest (Glenn Tipton / Rob Halford / K.K. Downing)
- Cover artwork by Uwe Jarling. Photo by Thomas Kärcher
- Live pics by Kerstin Rössler & Andreas Vogt
- Layout by Stefan & Mike Hanus. Graphic work by Stefan Hanus
