= Bloodred Massacre =

Studio album by Fleshcrawl
- Released: 13 October 1997
- Recorded: 11–23 August 1997 at The Abyss studio in Grangärde-Pärlby, Sweden
- Genre: Death metal
- Length: 33:57
- Language: English
- Label: Black Mark
- Producers: Fleshcrawl, Peter Tägtgren

Fleshcrawl chronology
Bloodsoul (1996)	Bloodred Massacre (1997)	As Blood Rains from the Sky... (2000)

Bloodred Massacre is the fourth studio album by the German death metal band Fleshcrawl, released in 1997. It is their first release to feature vocalist Sven Gross, who performed with the band until his death in 2021.

This album, although somewhat different from the previous Fleshcrawl releases, is highly archetypal of the band's general 1990s sound. It is more rhythmic than its predecessors, helping to fortify the band's stake in the melodic death metal genre, and is strongly characterized by agile and smooth, yet sometimes dramatic, patterning transitions, medium-to-high tempo cyclic riffs that sometimes resemble speed metal, baritonic death growls, and rapid double bass drum rolls, typical of death metal. The general themes of the album remain consistent with earlier releases and cover such concepts as violent death, hell-born rebirth ("Hellspawn"), misanthropy ("Bloodred Massacre"), deception ("The Messenger"), and eternal damnation ("Through the Veil of Dawn").

== Track listing ==
1. "Hellspawn" – 3:51
2. "Dark Dimension" – 4:39
3. "Bloodred Massacre" – 3:43
4. "Awaiting the End" – 5:21
5. "The Messenger" – 3:04
6. "Through the Veil of Dawn" – 2:58
7. "Necrophiliac" (Slayer cover) – 3:41
8. "Beyond Belief" – 5:08
9. "Slaughter at Dawn" – 1:30

== Personnel ==
- Sven Gross – vocals
- Mike Hanus – guitar, bass
- Stefan Hanus – guitar
- Bastian Herzog – drums

=== Production ===
- Produced by Fleshcrawl & Peter Tägtgren
- Recorded and mixed at The Abyss studio, Grangärde-Pärlby, Sweden, 11–23 August 1997
- Engineered by Peter Tägtgren and Mikael Hedlund
- Mixed by Fleshcrawl & Peter Tägtgren
- Mastered by Peter in de Betou at Cuttingroom, Solna, Sweden
- All music and lyrics by Fleshcrawl, except "Necrophiliac", originally by Slayer (Hanneman/King)
- Cover artwork by Juha Vuorma
- Layout by Stefan & Mike Hanus. Graphic work by Stefan Hanus (Orca Graphics).
