= Carnage (band) =

Swedish death metal band

- Left to right: Jeppe Larsson, Johan Liiva, Michael Amott, Johnny Dordevic

Background information
- Also known as: Global Carnage
- Origin: Växjö, Sweden
- Genres: Death metal; grindcore (early)
- Years active: 1988–1991
- Labels: Necrosis, Earache
- Spinoffs: Dismember, Arch Enemy
- Past members: Michael Amott; Johan Liiva; Jeppe Larsson; Matti Kärki; Fred Estby; David Blomqvist; Johnny Dordevic

Carnage was a Swedish death metal band formed in 1988 by Michael Amott and Johan Liiva. The members of the group would later form Dismember and Arch Enemy. They released one album before disbanding in 1991.

== History ==
Michael Amott and Johan Liiva founded Carnage in Växjö, Sweden at the end of 1988. They released two-widely traded demos, The Day Man Lost and Infestation of Evil in 1989. Plagued by lineup changes, Carnage released their only album, Dark Recollections, in 1990 when Amott was the sole remaining founding member. The album was released as a split CD with Cadaver's Hallucinating Anxiety on Necrosis Records, a subdivision of Earache Records, and was re-released with bonus tracks in 2000.

Amott went on to join Carcass, and later formed Arch Enemy with Johan Liiva and Spiritual Beggars. Matti Kärki, David Blomqvist, and Fred Estby went on to reform Dismember.

== Band members ==
- Michael Amott – guitar (1988–1990)
- Johan Liiva – bass, vocals (1988)
- Jeppe Larsson – drums (1988)
- Matti Kärki – vocals (1989–1990)
- Fred Estby – drums (1989–1990)
- David Blomqvist – guitar (1989–1990)
- Johnny Dordevic – bass (1989–1990)

== Discography ==
- The Day Man Lost (1989 demo)
- Live in Stockholm (1989 EP)
- Infestation of Evil (1989 demo)
- Dark Recollections (1990)
