= Richard Cabeza =

Swedish musician

Richard Cabeza (a.k.a. Richard Daemon) is a Swedish musician. He played bass in various death metal bands, including Unanimated, Dismember, Carbonized, and Murder Squad. He was also the vocalist of the band General Surgery. In 2002, Cabeza was the touring bassist of Dark Funeral. After leaving Sweden he resided in Dallas, Texas, where he formed the band Rape, Pillage and Burn. He now lives in Belgium 2023.

== Dismember ==
Cabeza was asked to join Dismember in Spring of 1990.

== Influences ==
Cabeza was introduced to music through punk rock at age 5, and was introduced to heavy metal through Judas Priest, Iron Maiden and Kiss. His older brother was a bassist.
