= Fred Estby =

Swedish drummer

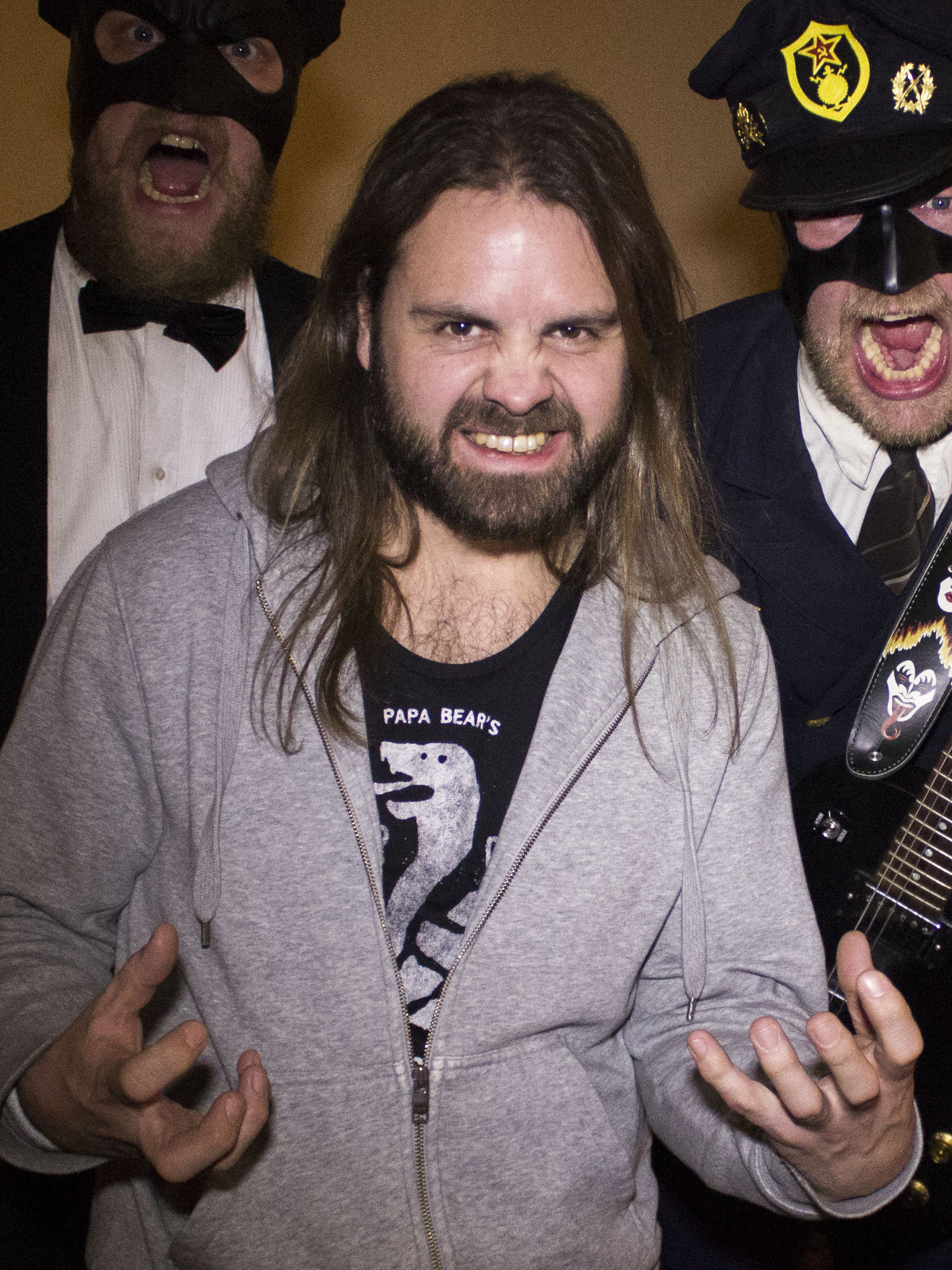
- Estby in 2013

Background information
- Born: Fredrik John Estby; 14 March 1972 (age 54); Stockholm, Sweden
- Genres: Death metal; heavy metal
- Occupations: Musician; songwriter; record producer
- Instrument: Drums
- Years active: 1988–present
- Member of: Dismember; Ekstasis
- Formerly of: Carnage; Daemon; Death Breath; Dismemberizer; Necronaut; Parodi; Shubniggaraut; Terra Firma; The A-Bombs; The Clint Eastwood Experience; The Dagger

Fred Estby (born 14 March 1972) is a Swedish musician best known as the drummer and main songwriter of the death metal band Dismember. He has also worked as a record producer on occasion.

== Career ==
Estby originally played drums in the band Carnage. He has appeared in various other projects including The A-Bombs (drums), The Clint Eastwood Experience (drums), Daemon (vocals), and Shubniggurat (vocals), Dismemberizer (drums), Parodi (guitar), Death Breath (vocals). He contributed vocals to the band Centinex of the album Subconscious Lobotomy, and appeared as a guest singer with Entombed in 1997 during a show in Stockholm where he sang "Left Hand Path". He also played drums The Dagger, a hard rock/heavy metal band from Stockholm formed in 2009 by Estby, David Blomqvist, Tobias Cristiansson and Jani Kataja. In 2022, he joined death metal band Ekstasis, which also includes vocalist Damien Moyal.
