= Dismember (band) =

Swedish death metal band

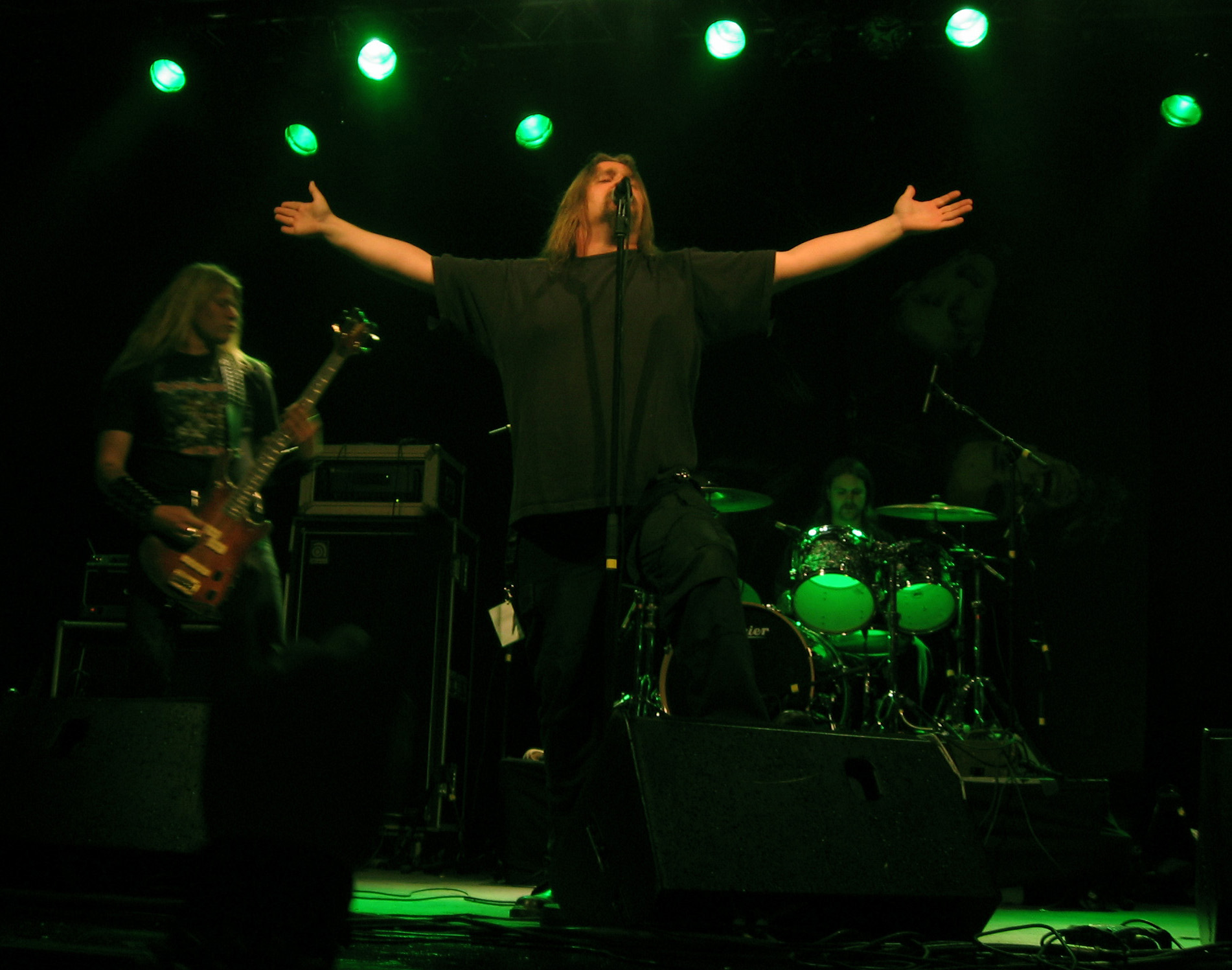
- Dismember performing in 2005

Background information
- Origin: Stockholm, Sweden
- Genre: Death metal
- Years active: 1988–2011, 2019–present
- Labels: Regain, Karmageddon, Nuclear Blast
- Members: Fred Estby; David Blomqvist; Robert Sennebäck; Matti Kärki; Richard Cabeza
- Past members: Martin Persson; Tobias Cristiansson; Thomas Daun; Sharlee D'Angelo; Magnus Sahlgren; Erik Gustafsson; Johan Bergebäck
- Website: dismember.se

Dismember is a Swedish death metal band from Stockholm, formed in 1988. They split up in 2011 and reunited in 2019. Pioneers of Swedish death metal, Dismember is considered one of the country's "big four", with Entombed, Grave, and Unleashed.

== History ==
=== Formation and Nuclear Blast era (1988–2002) ===
The band formed in Stockholm in 1988. After a hiatus, during which several members joined Carnage, the band began recording in earnest in 1991. They released their debut album, Like an Ever Flowing Stream, that year. The album is heralded as a milestone for the burgeoning Swedish death metal scene and established the band's fanbase, which was bolstered by the controversy surrounding the song "Skin Her Alive". The track prompted an obscenity charge in the United Kingdom, against which the band successfully defended themselves.

In 1992, Dismember released the Pieces EP, and the following year continued with second album Indecent & Obscene, which featured the song "Dreaming in Red". The "Dreaming in Red" videoclip was shown on MTV's Headbangers Ball. According to an interview with fellow Nuclear Blast group Benediction in metallian.com, they and Dismember got into a business dispute and eventually a physical altercation at this stage over tour arrangements and monies owed.

Like many other Scandinavian death metal bands, Dismember softened their sound in the mid-1990s, with 1995's more melodic Massive Killing Capacity getting a good public response. In 1997, they attempted to return to their previous style with the EP Misanthropic, which was a preview of the full-length album Death Metal. That album was released later in 1997 and became a sales disappointment. Their last album for Nuclear Blast was 2000's Hate Campaign.

=== Switching labels (2003–2006) ===
Around 2003, Dismember signed with Karmageddon Records. In 2004, they released their sole album with that label, Where Ironcrosses Grow, which some thought sounded close to Hate Campaign and was inspired by Iron Maiden and Autopsy.

They switched record companies in 2005, signing to Regain Records, which bought the rights to their earlier albums and released them as luxury digipak editions. In 2006, Dismember released their seventh album, The God That Never Was, which continued the style of its predecessor. The band spent February on the road in Europe. In November 2006, Dismember toured Europe as part of the Masters of Death tour, with Grave, Unleashed, Entombed, and Exterminator.

=== Split with Fred Estby and final album (2007–2010) ===
After the release of The God That Never Was and some touring, Estby left the band "after long and careful consideration". In a posting on the official site on 20 April 2007, Estby cited touring demands and family needs as key reasons for him leaving the band. His statements appears as, "My decision to put my family in first hand makes it impossible to keep on touring and commit to the band full time. I want to thank all the fans, friends, bands and all the other cool people I've met through the years and I wish Dismember all the best in the future. Fred."

In April 2008, they released their eighth album, Dismember.

Dismember released the two-disc DVD Under Blood Red Skies in late July 2009. The live concerts were filmed in the Netherlands and at the 2008 Party San Open Air Festival in Bad Berka, Germany. The DVD included a documentary and interviews with band members. Erik Danielsson of Trident Art created the cover art.

=== Breakup and reunion (2011–present) ===
On 16 October 2011, bassist Tobias Cristiansson stated that Dismember had broken up: "After 23 years, Dismember have now decided to quit. We wish to thank all our fans for your support."

On a possible reunion, drummer Fred Estby told Invisible Oranges in August 2016, "People were telling me that all the time. So maybe we should try to do some shows and get everything back. We always owned our rights to the albums and shirts, but there's still loose ends to tie up. I just wanted to set the record straight and hopefully do some shows in the future."

A reunion was teased in August 2018, with the band posting random photos on their Facebook account. It was later officially announced, on 14 January 2019, that the original Dismember lineup had reunited and would perform together for the first time in over 20 years at Scandinavia Deathfest that October.

In a May 2021 interview MetalBite.com, Estby stated that Dismember might consider releasing their first studio album in over a decade in either 2022 or 2023: "I hope we get out of this situation soon so that we can play some shows and we wanna get more shows going across the globe, a lot of territories that we haven't booked shows for yet and I hope that's gonna happen as soon as this is all over. And maybe we'll have a new record out in a year or two." Estby later stated in 2024 that, although the band had material written for a new album, efforts to complete it were hindered by the band members residing in different countries. As of 2026, no new album has been released.

In July 2022, the band resigned to Nuclear Blast Records and started reissuing their back catalog digitally, starting with Like an Ever Flowing Stream.

On August 17, 2024, the band played a Like an Ever Flowing Stream setlist in Brooklyn with Vomitory, Undergang, Malignancy, and Morpheus Descends opening. Later that year, the band ruled out the possibility of full-length tours. Etsby said, "We don't do more than two shows in one weekend. If we start touring again, you're gonna start seeing the bad sides of being away from your family and your home and your work, and you can't take off from work. We all have careers that we don't wanna give up. So, that's number one." He stated that they were interested in keeping live performances limited to prevent the band from becoming a chore for them.

== Musical style ==
Alex Distefano of OC Weekly wrote: "The band's mix of raging violence, ultra mechanical speed and technical intensity has made for some gut busting, jaw breaking death metal. Over the years, with seven additional albums, the band grew darker, angrier [and] faster."

== Members ==
Current members

- David Blomqvist – lead guitar (1988, 1990–2011, 2019–present), rhythm guitar (2003–2005), bass (1988–1990, 2005–2006)
- Fred Estby – drums (1988–2007, 2019–present)
- Robert Sennebäck – rhythm guitar (1988–1998, 2019–present), lead guitar (1988–1990), vocals (1988–1989)
- Matti Kärki – vocals (1989–2011, 2019–present)
- Richard Cabeza (a.k.a. Richard Diamon/Daemon) – bass (1990–1998, 2000–2004, 2019–present)

Former members

- Erik Gustafsson – bass (1988)
- Magnus Sahlgren – rhythm guitar (1998–2003)
- Sharlee D'Angelo – bass (1998–2000)
- Johan Bergebäck – bass (2004–2005)
- Martin Persson – rhythm guitar (2005–2011), bass (2005–2006)
- Tobias Cristiansson – bass (2006–2011)
- Thomas Daun – drums (2007–2011)

== Discography ==
=== Albums ===
- Like an Ever Flowing Stream (1991)
- Indecent & Obscene (1993)
- Massive Killing Capacity (1995)
- Death Metal (1997)
- Hate Campaign (2000)
- Where Ironcrosses Grow (2004)
- The God That Never Was (2006)
- Dismember (2008)

=== Singles and EPs ===
- "Skin Her Alive" (single, 1991)
- Pieces (EP, 1992)
- Casket Garden (EP, 1995)
- Misanthropic (EP, 1997)

=== Demos ===
- Dismembered (1988)
- Last Blasphemies (1989)
- Rehearsal (1989)
- Reborn in Blasphemy (1990)

=== DVDs and videos ===
- Live Blasphemies (DVD, 2004)
- Under Blood Red Skies (DVD, 2009)

== Bibliography ==
- Daniel Ekeroth. Swedish Death Metal. Brooklyn: Bazillion Points Books, 2008
- Mudrian, Albert. Choosing Death: the Improbable History of Death Metal and Grindcore. New York: Feral House, 2004
