= Matti Kärki =

Swedish singer

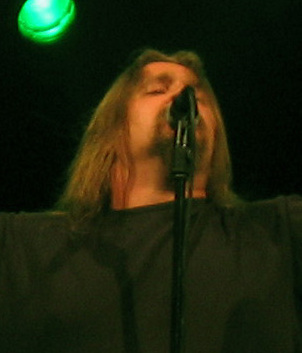
- Kärki in 2005

Background information
- Born: 13 December 1972 (age 53); Sweden
- Genres: Death metal
- Occupation: Musician
- Instruments: Vocals, bass guitar
- Years active: 1988-present

Matti Kärki (born 13 December 1972) is a Swedish singer who is best known for his work with Dismember. Before he joined Dismember in 1991, he was the singer in the Swedish band Carnage (1989–1990). The first band fronted by Kärki was Therion in 1989. He also appears with the Autopsy-inspired Murder Squad since 1993. Furthermore, he was part of the experimental band Carbonized from 1988 to 1990. Kärki appeared as a guest-singer of Entombed and sang "But Life Goes On" on the Entombed show in Sala on 24 June 1990. Moreover, he was the bass player for General Surgery from 1988 to 1990, and joined again in early 2000 when the band was temporarily resurrected to record a song for the Carcass tribute album Requiems of Revulsion.
