= 1992 in heavy metal music =

This is a timeline documenting the events of heavy metal in the year 1992.

== Events ==
- Alice in Chains release their widely popular concept album, Dirt.
- Motörhead's drummer Phil Taylor finally leaves after recording "Ain't No Nice Guy" for the March or Die album. The drummer on that album is Tommy Aldridge, who was replaced by Mikkey Dee after recording the album.
- Metallica frontman James Hetfield suffers second and third-degree burns due to a pyrotechnic accident during the Guns N' Roses/Metallica Stadium Tour.
- Living Colour's bassist Muzz Skillings leaves and is replaced by Doug Wimbish.
- On April, 20, The Freddie Mercury Tribute Concert is held. Top heavy metal/hard rock acts such as Guns N' Roses, Def Leppard, Metallica, Extreme and the heavy metal parody band Spinal Tap perform, as well as heavy metal/hard rock legends such as Robert Plant (Led Zeppelin), Roger Daltrey (The Who), and Tony Iommi (Black Sabbath).
- Body Count sparks nationwide controversy over the song from their self-titled debut album, "Cop Killer".
- Vince Neil leaves Mötley Crüe and is replaced by John Corabi
- Slayer drummer Dave Lombardo is replaced by Paul Bostaph.
- Fantoft Stave Church near Bergen, Norway is destroyed by Varg Vikernes of Burzum on June 6. Other church burnings attributed to black metal musicians also took place throughout Scandinavia.

== Newly formed bands ==
- Aborym
- Alarum
- Altar
- Am I Blood
- Ancient
- The Atomic Bitchwax
- Beseech
- Beyond Twilight
- Black Messiah
- Blockheads
- Bloodlet
- Bloodthorn
- Boris
- Cage
- Candiria
- Callenish Circle
- Carpathian Forest
- Cavity
- Cephalic Carnage
- Charon
- Cruachan
- Cubanate
- Darkseed
- Deinonychus
- Dew-Scented
- Dies Irae
- Disciple
- Discordance Axis
- Disgorge
- Edguy
- Embodyment
- Esoteric
- Evoken
- Fight
- Fimbulwinter
- Freak Kitchen
- Freak of Nature
- Gates of Ishtar
- Godgory
- Gorgoroth
- Gotthard
- Grand Belial's Key
- Graveworm
- Harvey Milk
- Helheim
- Hey
- In the Woods...
- Infernum
- Jimmie's Chicken Shack
- Judas Iscariot
- Jungle Rot
- Legion of the Damned (as Occult)
- Lethargy
- Lord Belial
- Lordi
- Malignancy
- Meathook Seed
- Memento Mori
- Memory Garden
- Moonspell
- Morifade
- Mystic Circle
- Mysticum
- Naglfar
- Nasum
- Necrophagist
- Nefilim
- Nidingr
- Obtest
- On Thorns I Lay
- P.O.D.
- Quo Vadis
- Rudra
- Sacramentum
- Saratoga
- Sirrah
- Skinless
- Sons of Otis
- Souls at Zero
- Sponge
- Stone Sour
- The 3rd and the Mortal
- The Chasm
- Tito & Tarantula
- Today Is the Day
- Trelldom
- Tristitia
- Troll
- Ultimatum
- Urgehal
- Vince Neil
- Vision of Disorder
- Weezer
- Wolfgang

== Reformed bands ==
- Mercyful Fate

== Albums ==
- 24-7 Spyz – Strength in Numbers
- AC/DC – AC/DC Live (live)
- Alice in Chains – Dirt
- Alice in Chains – Sap (EP)
- Amorphis - The Karelian Isthmus
- Anathema - The Crestfallen (EP)
- Anthem – Domestic Booty
- Anvil – Worth the Weight
- Asphyx - Crush the Cenotaph (EP)
- At the Gates – The Red in the Sky Is Ours
- Atrocity - Todessehnsucht
- Autopsy – Acts of the Unspeakable
- Babylon A.D. – Nothing Sacred
- Bad4Good – Refugee
- Bangalore Choir – On Target
- Bang Tango – Aint No Jive Live
- Benediction - Dark is the Season (EP)
- Biohazard – Urban Discipline
- Black Sabbath – Dehumanizer
- Blind Guardian – Somewhere Far Beyond
- Body Count – Body Count
- Bolt Thrower – The IVth Crusade
- Bon Jovi – Keep the Faith
- Brain Dead – From the Ecstasy
- Brutal Truth - Extreme Conditions Demand Extreme Responses
- Burzum – Burzum
- Candlemass – Chapter VI
- Cannibal Corpse – Tomb of the Mutilated
- Carcass - Tools of the Trade (EP)
- Cathedral - Soul Sacrifice (EP)
- Celtic Frost – Parched with Thirst Am I and Dying (comp)
- Comecon - Megatrends in Brutality
- Count Raven - Destruction of the Void
- Cro-Mags – Alpha Omega
- Damn Yankees – Don't Tread
- Darkthrone – A Blaze in the Northern Sky
- Danzig – Danzig III: How the Gods Kill
- Def Leppard – Adrenalize
- Deicide – Legion
- Deliverance – Stay of Execution
- Demolition Hammer – Epidemic of Violence
- Dirty Looks – Five Easy Pieces
- Dismember - Pieces (EP)
- Dream Theater – Images and Words
- Drive – Diablero
- Earthshaker – Earthshaker
- Edge of Sanity - Unorthodox
- Edwin Dare – Unthinkable Deed
- Electric Boys – Groovus Maximus
- Elegy – Labyrinth Of Dreams
- Exhorder – The Law
- Exodus – Force of Habit
- Extreme – III Sides to Every Story
- Faith No More – Angel Dust
- Faster Pussycat – Belted, Buckled and Booted
- Faster Pussycat – Whipped!
- Fatal Opera - Fatal Opera
- Fear Factory – Soul of a New Machine
- FireHouse – Hold Your Fire
- FM - Aphrodisiac
- The Gathering - Always...
- Godflesh – Pure
- Gorefest – False
- Maestro Alex Gregory – Paganini's Last Stand
- Grave - You'll Never See...
- Gun – Gallus
- Gwar – America Must Be Destroyed
- Hardline – Double Eclipse
- Heavens Gate – Hell for Sale!
- Heavens Gate – More Hysteria (EP)
- Helmet – Meantime
- Darren Housholder – Darren Housholder
- Hypocrisy – Penetralia
- Incantation - Onward to Golgotha
- Immortal – Diabolical Fullmoon Mysticism
- Impetigo - Horror of the Zombies
- Iron Maiden – Fear of the Dark
- Kik Tracee – Field Trip
- Killers – Murder One
- King's X – King's X
- Kiss – Revenge
- Krabathor - Only Our Death Is Welcome...
- Kreator – Renewal
- Kyuss – Blues for the Red Sun
- Lacrimosa – Einsamkeit
- L.A. Guns – Cuts
- Lawnmower Deth - The Return of the Fabulous Metal Bozo Clowns
- Life Sex & Death – The Silent Majority
- Little Caesar – Influence
- Loudness – Loudness
- Love/Hate – Wasted In America
- Lynch Mob – Lynch Mob
- Tony MacAlpine – Freedom to Fly
- Malevolent Creation – Retribution
- Yngwie Malmsteen – Fire and Ice
- Manowar – The Triumph of Steel
- Massacre - Inhuman Condition (EP)
- Marduk - Dark Endless
- Megadeth – Countdown to Extinction
- Mekong Delta - Kaleidoscope
- Mercyful Fate - Return of the Vampire
- Ministry – Psalm 69: The Way to Succeed and the Way to Suck Eggs
- M.O.D. - Rhythm of Fear
- Monster Magnet – Tab (EP)
- Monstrosity – Imperial Doom
- Mordred - Vision (EP)
- Mortification - Scrolls of the Megilloth
- Motörhead – March ör Die
- My Dying Bride – As the Flower Withers
- My Dying Bride – Symphonaire Infernus et Spera Empyrium (EP)
- Napalm Death – Utopia Banished
- Necrophagist – Requiems of Festered Gore (demo)
- Nembrionic - Themes on an Occult Theory (EP)
- Neurosis – Souls at Zero
- Next (MX) - Pelea o Muere
- Nine Inch Nails – Broken (EP)
- Nine Inch Nails – Fixed (EP)
- Nocturnus – Thresholds
- Non-Fiction – In the Know
- Nuclear Assault - Live at the Hammersmith Odeon
- Obituary – The End Complete
- Oomph! – Oomph!
- Pantera – Vulgar Display of Power
- Pan.Thy.Monium - Dawn of Dreams
- Paradise Lost – Shades of God
- Pitchshifter – Submit (EP)
- Pretty Maids - Sin-Decade
- Pro-Pain – Foul Taste of Freedom
- Prong - Whose Fist Is This Anyway (EP)
- Psychotic Waltz – Into the Everflow
- Racer X – Extreme Volume II Live (live)
- Rage – Trapped!
- Rage Against the Machine – Rage Against the Machine
- RAMP – Thoughts
- Re-Animator - That Was Then...This Is Now
- Reverend – Live (live EP)
- Riot - Live in Japan
- Rollins Band – The End of Silence
- Sadus – A Vision of Misery
- Saigon Kick – The Lizard
- Saint Vitus - C.O.D.
- Saints & Sinners – Saints & Sinners
- Samael - Blood Ritual
- Saxon – Forever Free
- The Screaming Jets – Tear of Thought
- Sinister - Cross The Styx
- Skid Row – B-Side Ourselves (EP)
- Skyclad - A Burnt Offering for the Bone Idol
- Slaughter – The Wild Life
- Sleeze Beez – Powertool
- Slik Toxik – Doin' the Nasty
- Sodom – Tapping the Vein
- Solitude Aeturnus – Beyond the Crimson Horizon
- Spinal Tap – Break Like the Wind
- Spread Eagle – Open To The Public
- Steelheart – Tangled in Reins
- Stone Temple Pilots – Core
- Izzy Stradlin – Izzy Stradlin and The Ju Ju Hounds
- Stratovarius – Twilight Time
- Suicidal Tendencies – Art of Rebellion
- T-Ride – T-Ride (album)
- Tankard – Stone Cold Sober
- Testament – The Ritual
- The Black Crowes – The Southern Harmony and Musical Companion
- Therapy? – Pleasure Death
- Therapy? – Nurse
- Therion - Beyond Sanctorum
- Tiamat – Clouds
- TNT – Realized Fantasies
- Tora Tora – Wild America
- Tourniquet – Pathogenic Ocular Dissonance
- Triumph – Edge of Excess
- Trixter – Hear!
- Trouble – Manic Frustration
- T.T. Quick – Thrown Together Live (live)
- Type O Negative - The Origin of the Feces
- Ugly Kid Joe – America's Least Wanted
- Unleashed – Shadows in the Deep
- Unruly Child – Unruly Child
- Vader – The Ultimate Incantation
- Vengeance Rising - Released Upon the Earth
- Viper – Evolution
- Viper Brazil – Vipera Sapiens (EP)
- Vital Remains – Let Us Pray
- Von – Satanic Blood
- Von Groove – Von Groove
- W.A.S.P. – The Crimson Idol
- Warrant – Dog Eat Dog
- Warrior Soul – Salutations from the Ghetto Nation
- White Zombie – La Sexorcisto: Devil Music Volume One
- Wildside – Under the Influence
- Xentrix - Kin

== Disbandments ==
- Armored Saint (reformed in 1999)
- Atheist (reformed in 1993)
- Britny Fox (reformed in 2000)
- Europe (Hiatus until December 31, 1999, then full reformation with John Norum at guitar on October 2, 2003)
- Nightfall
- Nitro (reformed in 2016)
- Ratt (reformed in 1996)
- Stryper (reformed in 2003)
- White Lion (reformed in 1999)

Preceded by 1991	Heavy Metal Timeline; 1992	Succeeded by 1993
