= Martin van Drunen =

Dutch death metal singer

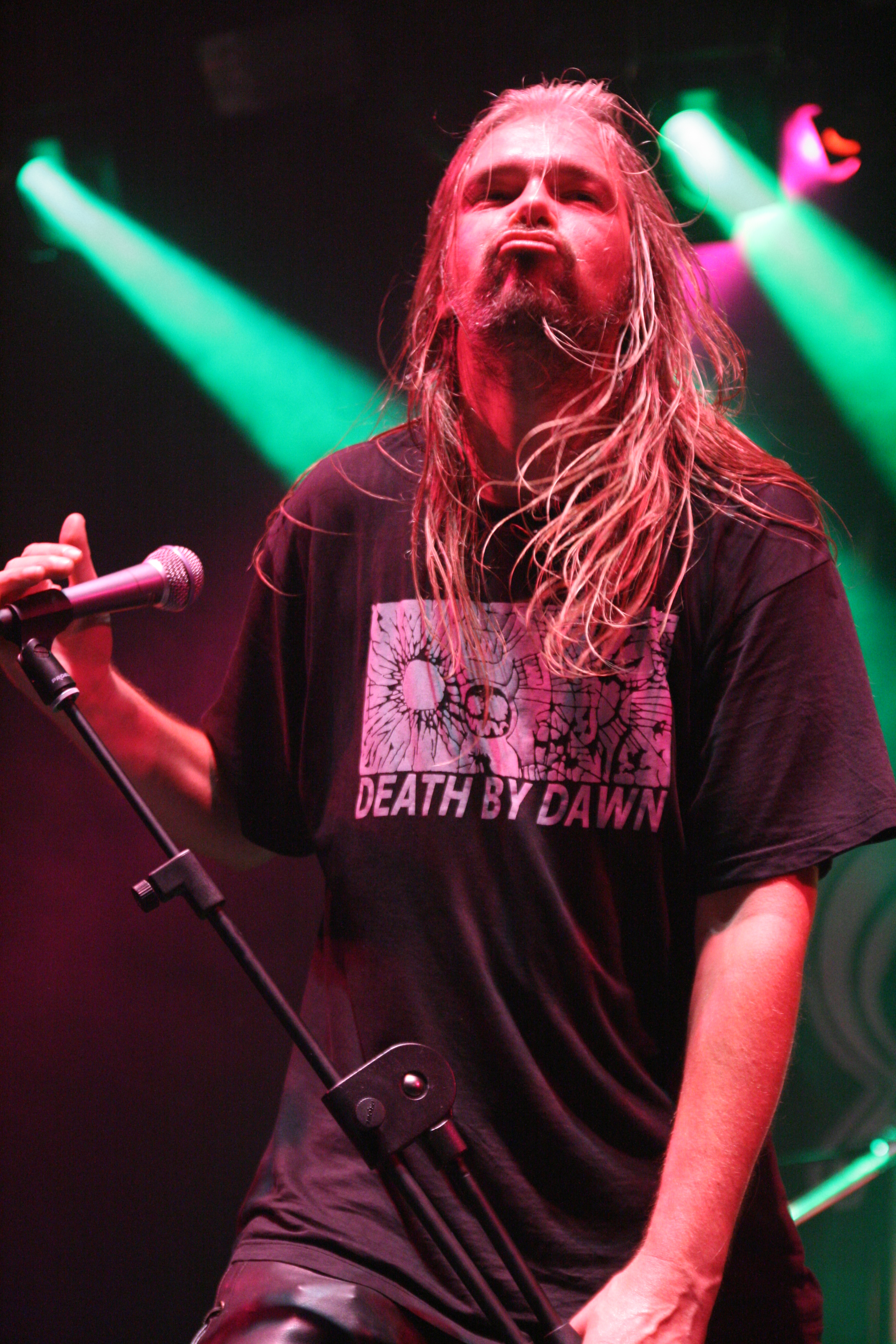
- Van Drunen performing with Asphyx at The Fridge in London, 2007

Background information
- Born: 1966 (age 59–60); Uden, Netherlands
- Origin: Enschede, Netherlands
- Genres: Death metal
- Occupation: Musician
- Instruments: Vocals, bass (early)
- Years active: 1986–present
- Member of: Asphyx, Grand Supreme Blood Court
- Formerly of: Hail of Bullets, Pestilence

Martin van Drunen (born 1966) is a Dutch death metal vocalist from Enschede, Overijssel. He is known for his tenures in the bands Pestilence (1987–1990), Asphyx (1992–present), and Bolt Thrower (1994–1997).

Van Drunen was Pestilence's vocalist and live bassist. He recorded two albums with the band before departing. He then joined Asphyx as the singer and bassist, but since 1992 has abandoned the bass to focus solely on vocals. In 1994, Van Drunen became the vocalist of Bolt Thrower. He did two tours with them, but never recorded an album.

Some journalists consider van Drunen to be among the greatest vocalists in extreme metal. His vocals in Pestilence drew comparisons to the early work of Chuck Schuldiner of Death. His vocals on Asphyx records are said to be higher in pitch.

== Early life ==
Van Drunen was born in Uden, in the south of the Netherlands. He was an accidental child, and his two sisters are 10 and 11 years older than him. His mother died when he was five years old. His father was in the Dutch Air Force and was relocated to the Twenthe Airbase when he was seven, so the family moved to Twente, near Enschede.

== Career ==
Van Drunen began in the Enschede band Pestilence. He was the vocalist, and also performed the bass duties live. He already knew guitarist Patrick Mameli, who played in a neighbourhood cover band. He recorded two albums with them, Malleus Maleficarum and Consuming Impulse. He left the band in 1990, after a tour of the United States with Death and Carcass. Van Drunen believed that Mameli was being too controlling, and during the tour, he felt insulted when Mameli accused of him of being an alcoholic and performing poorly live. Van Drunen also disliked the band's plan to record the next Pestilence album with Scott Burns at Florida's Morrissound Studios, because he thought his production would not fit the band's sound well.

After his departure from Pestilence, van Drunen joined Asphyx as the singer and bass player in 1990 (in 1992, he would abandon his position as bass player to focus solely on vocals) and recorded six studio albums in total. He performed the vocals on Comecon's second album Converging Conspiracies in 1993 and then formed his own band called Submission. In 1994, he was asked to replace Karl Willetts in the UK death metal band Bolt Thrower. Van Drunen did two tours with Bolt Thrower, but he left in 1997 because he did not feel like a part of the band, and also at the time he was suffering from alopecia and disliked going on stage with bald spots, but other band members did not want to cancel shows just for that reason.

In 2006, an "all-star" death metal band by the name Hail of Bullets was formed with van Drunen doing vocals, ex-Houwitser bass player Theo van Eekelen, Gorefest drummer Ed Warby and both Thanatos guitarists Paul Baayens and Stephan Gebédi. In May 2008, they released an album called …Of Frost and War. In 2009, van Drunen performed guest vocals on The Project Hate MCMXCIX's album The Lustrate Process. In October 2010, Hail of Bullets released their second album On Divine Winds.

Van Drunen has said on multiple occasions that he will never rejoin Pestilence, once describing the band as "a disgrace to what it once was" with no passion for the music anymore, only the money.

== Discography ==
=== With Pestilence ===
- Malleus Maleficarum (1988)
- Consuming Impulse (1989)

=== With Asphyx ===
Albums

- The Rack (1991)
- Last One on Earth (1992)
- Death...The Brutal Way (2009)
- Deathhammer (2012)
- Incoming Death (2016)
- Necroceros (2021)

EPs & Others

- Crush the Cenotaph (EP) (1992)
- Death... The Brutal Way (7" advance single) (2008)
- Live Death Doom (live DVD) (2010)

=== With Comecon ===
- Converging Conspiracies (1993)

=== With Death By Dawn ===
- One Hand, One Foot and a Lot of Teeth (2006)

=== With Hail of Bullets ===
- Hail of Bullets (demo)
- …Of Frost and War (2008)
- Warsaw Rising (EP) (2009)
- On Divine Winds (2010)
- III: The Rommel Chronicles (2013)

=== With Grand Supreme Blood Court ===
- Bow Down Before the Blood Court (2012)
