= Hail of Bullets =

Dutch death metal band

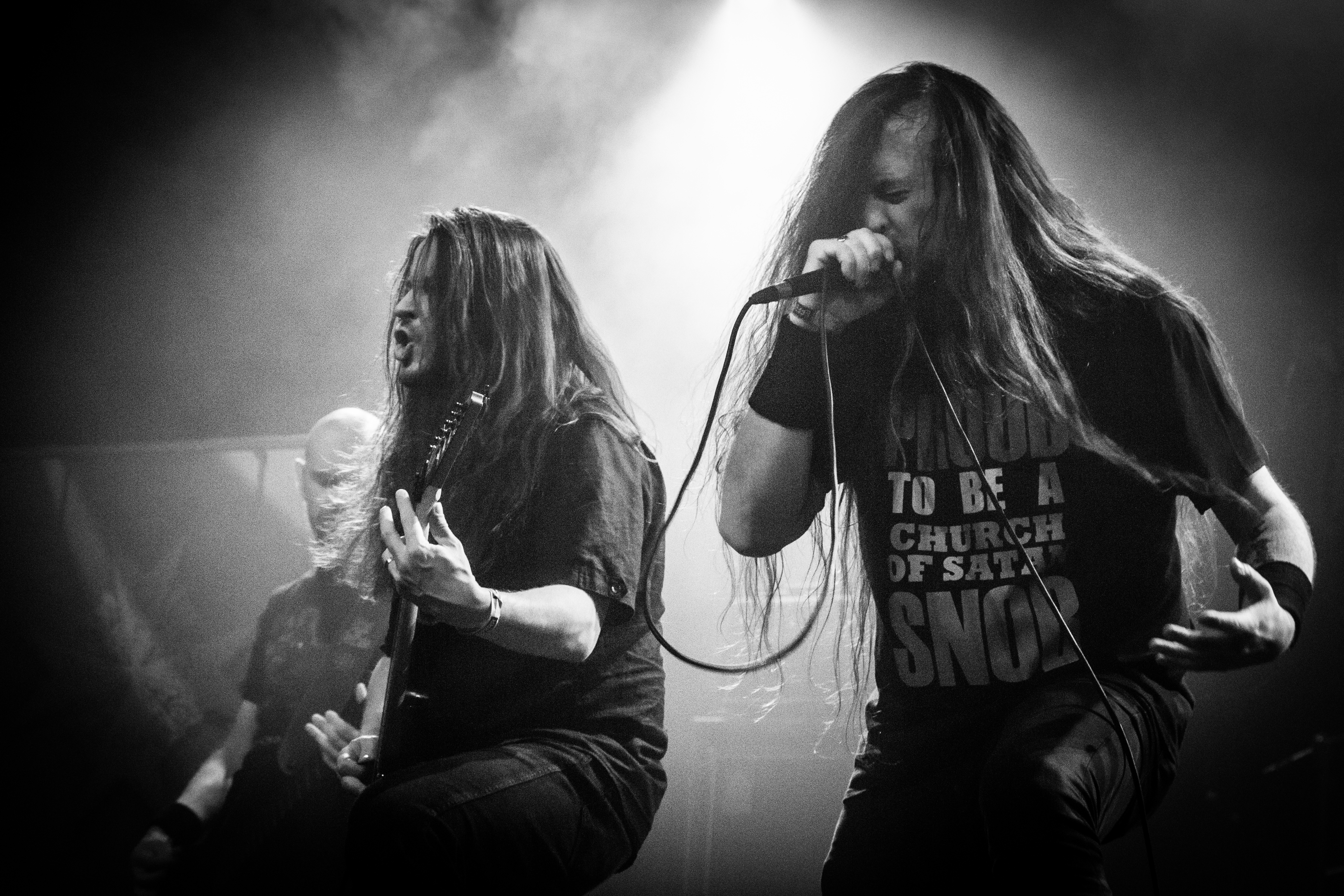
- Hail of Bullets at Eindhoven Metal Meeting 2016

Background information
- Origin: Rotterdam, Netherlands
- Genre: Death metal
- Years active: 2006–2017
- Label: Metal Blade
- Spinoffs: Grand Supreme Blood Court
- Spinoff of: Asphyx; Thanatos; Gorefest
- Members: Dave Ingram; Ed Warby; Theo van Eekelen; Stephan Gebédi; Paul Baayens
- Past members: Martin van Drunen
- Website: hailofbullets.com

Hail of Bullets was a Dutch death metal supergroup from Rotterdam. The band's lyrics deal with the Second World War, based on the research of vocalist Martin van Drunen, described as the band's "resident historian". The band has released three albums via Metal Blade Records.

== History ==
Hail of Bullets formed at the end of 2006 as an old-school death metal band when guitarist Stephan Gebédi recruited singer Martin van Drunen, drummer Ed Warby, bassist Theo van Eekelen and guitarist Paul Baayens. The members knew each other from previous and present bands like Asphyx, Gorefest, Thanatos, and Houwitser. Old-school death metal bands like Autopsy, Massacre, Bolt Thrower, early Death, and Celtic Frostinfluenced Hail of Bullets. Warby related that the band formed "after a night of hard drinking" when the hungover members decided to "bring back the old school values that we felt were sorely missing from modern day death metal."

In July 2007, the band recorded a four-song promotional CD. Dan Swanö produced it at Unisound Studios. Metal Blade Records released the band's debut album …Of Frost and War in May 2008. The album focused on the Eastern Front during World War II, from both the German and Soviet perspectives as the tide of the battle turned at Stalingrad.

The debut album was followed by a six-track mini-album in July 2009, Warsaw Rising, which featured two new songs, a cover version of Twisted Sister's "Destroyer", and three live tracks. More shows followed and the band first visited the USA at 2009's Maryland Deathfest.

In the beginning of 2010, the band started work on its second full-length album, about the Pacific Campaign of World War II. Mick Koopman provided the artwork. Warby produced the album and Swanö mixed it. On Divine Winds was released in October 2010. The album entered the German album charts and was voted 'album of the month' in metal magazines such as Rock Hard (Germany), Legacy (Germany), and Terrorizer (UK).

The band spent 2011 playing prestigious European Summer festivals like Hellfest, Wacken Open Air, Summer Breeze, Party.San Open Air festival, and Brutal Assault.

In 2013, the band announced that it would return to the studio in February to record its third full-length album, released on 25 October 2013 via Metal Blade Records. Dan Swanö mixed and mastered the album with producer Ed Warby. III: The Rommel Chronicles was based on German Field Marshal Erwin Rommel. Dutch artist Erik Wijnands provided the cover art.

At the end of 2015, Hail of Bullets parted ways with singer Martin van Drunen because of personal issues. Dave Ingram (ex-Bolt Thrower/Benediction, Down Among the Dead Men) sang for the band's appearance at the Maryland Deathfest. Following the band's set, Ingram was announced as a permanent replacement.

The band announced their disbandment in March 2017.

== Members ==
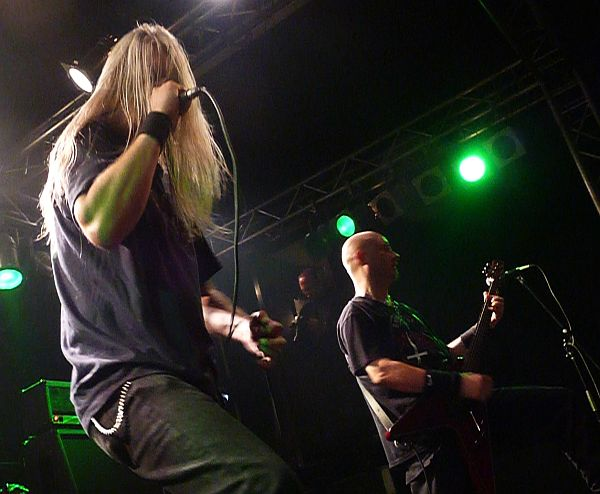
Martin van Drunen and Stephen Gebédi in 2009

=== Final lineup ===
- Paul Baayens – guitars (2006–2017)
- Stephan Gebédi – guitars (2006–2017)
- Theo Van Eekelen – bass guitar (2006–2017)
- Ed Warby – drums (2006–2017)
- Dave Ingram – vocals (2016–2017)

=== Former members ===
- Martin van Drunen – vocals (2006–2015)

== Discography ==
=== Demo albums ===
- Hail of Bullets (self-released, 2007)

=== EPs ===
- Warsaw Rising (Metal Blade, 2009)

=== Albums ===
- …Of Frost and War (Metal Blade, 2008)
- On Divine Winds (Metal Blade, 2010)
- III: The Rommel Chronicles (Metal Blade, 2013)
