= III: The Rommel Chronicles =

Studio album by Hail of Bullets
- Released: 28 October 2013
- Studio: Sandlane Studios (drums), The Warbunker (guitars and bass), Harrow Studios (vocals)
- Genre: Death metal
- Length: 45:48
- Label: Metal Blade Records
- Producer: Ed Warby

Hail of Bullets chronology
On Divine Winds (2010)	III: The Rommel Chronicles (2013)

Professional ratings
Review scores
Source	Rating
About.com	4/5 stars
Allmusic	3.5/5 stars
Exclaim!	8/10

III: The Rommel Chronicles is the third and final full-length studio album by Hail of Bullets, an old school death metal band formed by current and former members of Asphyx and Gorefest. It continues the band's conceptual focus upon the Second World War, with the album theme revolving around the life of German Field Marshal Erwin Rommel.

== Concept ==
Unlike previous Hail of Bullet albums, which focused on a particular theatre of World War II, the band's third album focused on German Field Marshal Erwin Rommel. Drummer Ed Warby suggested that the African theatre "seemed like the most logical subject to tackle, but we didn't want to do another concept album just like the previous two. So Martin [van Drunen, vocals] came up with the idea to focus on Rommel instead, which enabled us to incorporate Africa into the story yet broaden the scope significantly". While the band was initially concerned about writing an album focused on Rommel, fearing "possibility of a ban in Germany, or a backlash from the anti-fascism movement", Warby contended that "anyone with half a brain can tell we're not glorifying a Nazi here".

== Track listing ==
No.	Title	Length
1.	"Swoop of the Falcon"	5:20
2.	"Pour le Mérite"	4:14
3.	"DG-7"	6:25
4.	"To the Last Breath of Man and Beast"	3:11
5.	"DAK"	3:45
6.	"The Desert Fox"	5:20
7.	"Tobruk"	4:26
8.	"Farewell to Africa"	2:51
9.	"The Final Front"	4:45
10.	"Death of a Field Marshal"	5:31
Total length:		45:48

== Personnel ==
- Martin van Drunen - vocals
- Stephan Gebedi - guitars
- Paul Baayens - guitars
- Ed Warby - drums
- Theo van Eekelen - bass
