= Boudewijn Vincent Bonebakker =

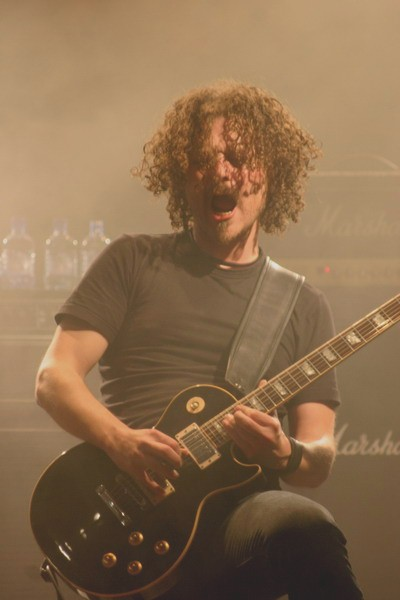

Background information
- Born: 16 April 1968 (age 58); Goes, Zuid-Beveland, Netherlands
- Genres: Rock, death metal
- Occupations: Musician, Teacher
- Instrument: Guitar
- Years active: 1990-present

Boudewijn Bonebakker (born 1968) is a Dutch guitarist, songwriter, and teacher. He is best known as the former guitarist of Gorefest, an extreme metal band, from 1991 to 2008. After the band broke up, he started a new band called Gingerpig, whose music spanned blues, funk, soul, and hard rock. In 2017, he joined the band Monomyth.

== Early life ==
He was raised in the town of Goes but moved to Breda at the age of 18.

== Career ==
He bought his first guitar at the age of sixteen. His father told him "if you want to keep that stringed instrument, you had better learn to make some angry sound noise out of it." He played with Stefan de Kroon (Racoon, Sjolmord) and Bert Hanssens (Hannibal) in the Stooges-like band 'the Yamahamamamas'. After the band's disbandment, he joined a band named LOOD, an industrial/noise band. LOOD took its influences from the music of Big Black, The Birthday Party, Rollins Band and Voivod. The band however did not last very long. In 1991, he joined Gorefest to replace Alex van Schaik.

After the break-up of Gorefest, Bonebakker took full course education in classical guitar at the Tilburg conservatory and got his degree and focused on teaching in his hometown. He was asked to form a Thin Lizzy tribute band for a local commemoration festival in 2004 and asked Ed Warby, bassist Peter Vink and singer/guitar player Ross Curry to join him. The group performed several times under the name Live and Dangerous. Shortly thereafter Jan-Chris and Boudewijn spoke for the first time in years and buried the hatchet. Gorefest was reunited. After two albums, which show a step back to death metal form, Gorefest had grown apart again and quit for a second time. This time for good.

=== Gingerpig ===
The purchase of a Hammond organ, towards the end of 2008, inspired Bonebakker to start Gingerpig. Not so much to justify the purchase of his Hammond, but to make rock as he believes it should be made.

"I've come to a point where I want to make genuine music, without too many constraints. Not some product manufactured with hard disc recording to cater to a carefully selected target audience. I want to record music that is human, organic and genuine and I want to do it with a band. As it used to be done, really." (Bonebakker)

When the time came to put together a new band, the first person Bonebakker got in touch with was drummer Ries Doms, quickly followed by bass player Sytse Roelevink. For his Hammond he turned to Jarno van Es, a pianist he had once seen maniacally working the keys in a smoke-filled local jazz den.

"I knew what sound I was looking for, so I needed a very specific type of musician for each instrument. For the drums I wanted one of those old-school, heart-and-soul, Zappa-style rollers, for the bass I tended more towards the Who and for the keys I was looking for a Jon Lord or a Keith Emerson. But pretty soon a lot of soul was thrown into the mix." (Bonebakker)

They started intense rehearsals to flesh out the songs. After an unreleased demo and brief series of performances, Doms decided to leave the band because he needed to focus on his other projects. Called in to replace him for a few gigs, jazz rock drummer and personal friend Maarten Poirters added such a range of possibilities to Gingerpig's pallet that Bonebakker asked him to join the band.

Together with producer Pieter Kloos, known for his work with The Devil's Blood, Vanderbuyst, 35007 and Motorpsycho, Gingerpig recorded eight tracks at Eindhoven's legendary "The Void" studio. No hard disc recording, no antiseptic production, just good old fashioned recording live on tape. "Think of the Allman Brothers Band, or the Faces. Exactly like it was done in the late sixties or early seventies. That’s why we just had to work with Pieter Kloos. Our ideas coincided almost 100%. Pieter stands for analogue recording, just like us. He is all about genuine sound. The whole album was recorded live, except for the vocals. Not the easiest way to work, I can assure you, but one that has resulted in a pure and unadulterated sound experience." (Bonebakker)

The first half of 2013 Gingerpig's second album is released. The band let go of their more improvisatory side with the departure of the keyboard player. "Hidden from view" shows a more compact, song orientated band. Gingerpig now being a trio, the guitar has taken back its main role in Bonebakker's music. Vocal wise he has become a fully matured rock singer.

The album Ghost on the Highway is released in 2015 and is followed by a tour through Europe with Kamchatka.

By the end of October 2017 Gingerpig issues the following statement in Facebook:

"After eight years, three released albums and halfway a fourth in the making, we've decided to park Gingerpig. Agendas, personal life in general, managing the band, it couldn't be matched with the creative flow any more. We've lost the spark to keep the dream alive and to keep Gingerpig going.

It's been one hell of a dream, we tried to stake our claim of relevance in the music world, a lot of the time it really felt like going against the grain, but the reality of it got the better of us. Blood is thick and one never knows if the spark will ignite again, but for now we'll leave it to rest."

Around that same time Boudewijn joins the instrumental space-rock collective Monomyth from The Hague. With Monomyth, the album Orbis Quadrantis is recorded which is released in September 2019. The album receives much critical acclaim.

== Discography ==
=== with Gorefest ===
- False (1992)
- The Eindhoven Insanity (1993)
- Erase (1994)
- Soul Survivor (1996)
- Chapter 13 (1998)
- La Muerte (2005)
- Rise To Ruin (2007)

=== with Gingerpig ===
- Demo (unreleased 2008)
- The Ways Of The Gingerpig (2011)
- Hidden From View (2013)
- Ghost On The Highway (2015)

=== with Monomyth ===
- Orbis Quadrantis (2019)
