= On Divine Winds =

Studio album by Hail of Bullets
- Released: 12 October 2010
- Recorded: Unisound Studio, Örebro, Sweden
- Genre: Death metal
- Length: 48:03
- Label: Metal Blade Records
- Producer: Dan Swanö

Hail of Bullets chronology
…Of Frost and War (2008)	On Divine Winds (2010)	III: The Rommel Chronicles (2013)

Professional ratings
Review scores
Source	Rating
About.com	4/5 stars
AllMusic	4/5 stars
Metal-Temple	8/10

On Divine Winds is the second album from Hail of Bullets, an old school death metal band formed by current and former members of Asphyx and Gorefest. On Divine Winds continued the band's focus upon the Second World War, this time focusing upon the Pacific Campaign. The album title is a reference to the English translation of "Kamikaze" and was produced by Dan Swanö.

== Background ==
Drummer Ed Warby said that the main difference between the first album and On Divine Winds was that the band "semi-subconsciously" incorporated more melody into the music. Warby attributed this emphasis on melody to the subject matter of the album:

The Pacific has more epic connotations and as such translates into huge musical themes in our heads, whereas the Eastern front topic on the last full-length album inspired a more bleak, stripped down musical style.

== Track listing ==
All music and lyrics by Hail of Bullets.

No.	Title	Length
1.	"The Eve of Battle"	1:06
2.	"Operation Z"	4:37
3.	"The Mukden Incident"	4:12
4.	"Strategy of Attrition"	4:57
5.	"Full Scale War"	5:19
6.	"Guadalcanal"	3:25
7.	"On Coral Shores"	5:10
8.	"Unsung Heroes"	5:14
9.	"Tokyo Napalm Holocaust"	5:20
10.	"Kamikaze"	4:27
11.	"To Bear the Unbearable"	4:16

== Personnel ==
Hail of Bullets

- Martin van Drunen – vocals
- Stephan Gebedi – guitars
- Paul Baayens – guitars
- Ed Warby – drums
- Theo van Eekelen – bass

Technical personnel

- Dan Swanö – mixing and mastering
- Chris van der Valk – drums and vocal recording
- Ed Warby – guitars and bass recording

Design personnel

- Mick Koopman – cover art and layout
- Daniel Horibogen – photography
- Cherie Goewie – photography
- Tom Jaschke – photography
- Christian Baeriswyl – photography
