= The Rack =

The Rack may refer to:

- The Rack (1915 film), an American silent drama film
- The Rack (1956 film), a courtroom drama starring Paul Newman
- The Rack (album), the 1991 debut album by Asphyx
- "The Rack" (The Professionals), a 1978 episode of the crime-action drama series

== See also ==
- Rack (disambiguation)
