= Soulburn =

Dutch death metal/black-doom band

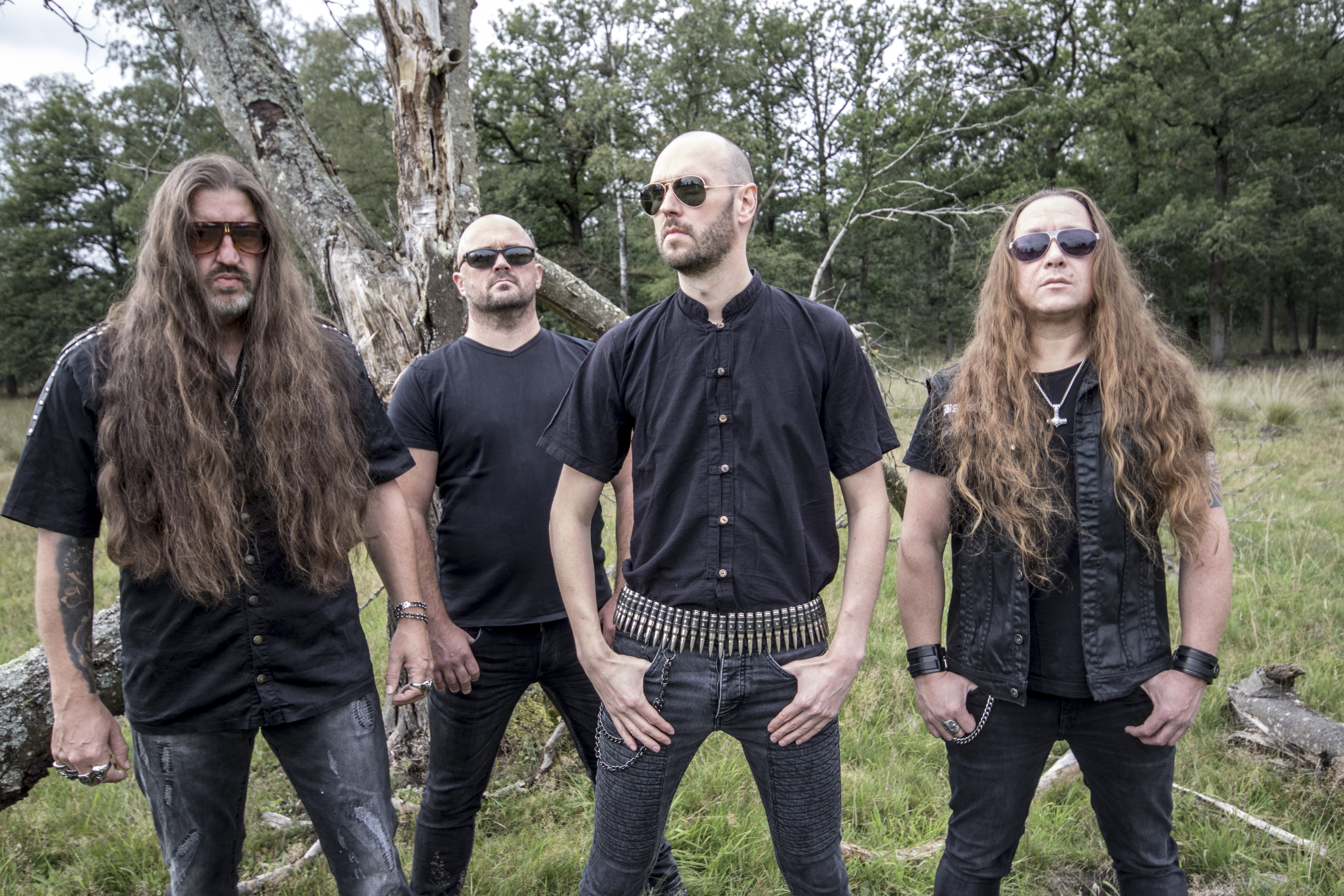
- Soulburn 2020

Background information
- Origin: Netherlands
- Genres: Death metal, black-doom
- Years active: 1996–1999, 2013–present
- Label: Century Media Records
- Spinoffs: Grand Supreme Blood Court
- Spinoff of: Asphyx
- Members: Marc Verhaar; Twan van Geel; Eric Daniels; Remco Kreft
- Past members: Wannes Gubbels; Bob Bagchus
- Website: www.facebook.com/official.soulburn/

Soulburn is a Dutch death metal/black-doom band.

== History ==
Soulburn formed after the dissolution of Dutch death metal band Asphyx in the mid-90s, when founding members Eric Daniels (guitars) and Bob Bagchus (drums) looked for a separate outlet for their Bathory and Venom admiration. After a demo and the Feeding On Angels debut album via Century Media Records in 1998, which featured singer and bassist Wannes Gubbels (Pentacle), Soulburn disbanded when Asphyx reformed and released On the Wings of Inferno in 2000 with the same line-up.

Sixteen years after their debut album, Soulburn reformed with a new line-up featuring Eric Daniels (guitars) and Bob Bagchus (drums), with Twan van Geel (Legion Of The Damned) as vocalist/bassist and Remco Kreft (Nailgun Massacre) as second guitarist to record their second album, The Suffocating Darkness. It was recorded with Harry Wijering (Harrow Productions) and mixed and mastered by Dan Swanö at Unisound Studios. The front cover was designed by Timo Ketola (Watain, Deathspell Omega, etc.) and additional art was provided by Roberto Toderico (Asphyx, etc.). A video clip for the song “In Suffocating Darkness”, off The Suffocating Darkness, is available online.

Soulburn released a split 7-inch EP with Desaster in 2015 featuring the track “The Lats Monument Of God”. Soulburn released their third album, Earthless Pagan Spirit, on November 18, 2016, via Century Media Records. This album was recorded in The Netherlands at Harrow Studio as well as Double Noise Studio and then mixed and mastered by Magnus "Devo" Andersson at Endarker Studio in Sweden (Marduk, Ofermod, etc.).

In June 2018, Bob Bagchus departed Soulburn. He was replaced with Marc Verhaar.

Soulburn released their fourth album, Noa’s D'ark, in November 2020.

On June 12, 2026, the band released their fifth album, Quantifying Cosmic Doom.

== Band members ==
=== Current members ===
- Eric Daniels - guitars (1996-1999, 2013–present)
- Twan van Geel - bass, vocals (2014–present)
- Remco Kreft - guitars (2014–present)
- Marc Verhaar - drums (2018–present)

=== Past members ===
- Wannes Gubbels - bass, vocals (1997-1999)
- Bob Bagchus - drums (1996-1999, 2013–2018)

== Discography ==
=== Studio albums ===
- Feeding on Angels (1998)
- The Suffocating Darkness (2014)
- Earthless Pagan Spirit (2016)
- Noa's D'ark (2020)
- Quantifying Cosmic Doom (2026)

=== Singles (7-inch) ===
- Split 7" with Desaster (2015)
- Carpe Noctem" 2-track (2018)

=== Extended plays (12-inch) ===
- Demo 1996 (2016)

=== Demos ===
- Demo 1996 (1996)
