= Chapter 13 (album) =

Studio album by Gorefest
- Released: 23 February 1998
- Recorded: Netherlands
- Genre: Death 'n' roll
- Length: 51:20
- Label: SPV/Steamhammer

Gorefest chronology
Soul Survivor (1996)	Chapter 13 (1998)	La Muerte (2005)

Professional ratings
Review scores
Source	Rating
AllMusic	4/5 stars

Chapter 13 is the fifth studio album released by Dutch death metal band Gorefest. It was released in 1998. Stylistically, this album continues the death 'n' roll style of the previous album. Despite being poorly received by fans, this album remains a favorite among the band members.

== Track listing ==
1. "Chapter Thirteen" – 3:05
2. "Broken Wing" – 4:04
3. "Nothingness" – 2:23
4. "Smile" – 3:08
5. "The Idiot" – 3:37
6. "Repentance" – 5:04
7. "Bordello" – 2:54
8. "F.S. 2000" – 6:09
9. "All Is Well" – 3:30
10. "Unsung" – 5:54
11. "Burn Out" – 3:15
12. "Super Reality – 3:16
13. "Serve the Masses" – 5:01

== Band members ==
- Jan-Chris de Koeijer – vocals, bass guitar
- Frank Harthoorn – guitar
- Boudewijn Vincent Bonebakker – guitar
- Ed Warby – drums
- Rene Merkelback – mellotron and grand piano
