= Ritzerfeld =

Ritzerfeld is a surname of German origin.

== List of people with the surname ==
- Hartmut Ritzerfeld (1950–2024), German painter
- Jörg Ritzerfeld (born 1983), German ski jumper

== See also ==
- Roterfeld
- Ritzer
