= Death...The Brutal Way =

Studio album by Asphyx
- Released: June 2009 (Europe); September 2009 (USA)
- Recorded: Winter of 2008–2009
- Studio: Sonic Assault Studio
- Genre: Death metal; death-doom
- Length: 48:51
- Label: Century Media; Ibex Moon
- Producer: Asphyx

Asphyx chronology
On the Wings of Inferno (2000)	Death...The Brutal Way (2009)	Deathhammer (2012)

Professional ratings
Review scores
Source	Rating
About.com	4.5/5 stars
Blabbermouth	8/10 stars

Death...The Brutal Way is the seventh album by Asphyx. It was released in June 2009 in Europe by Century Media Records. and in the US by Ibex Moon. A limited edition of 1000 copies contains a bonus DVD featuring the band's reunion show from the 2007 Party.San Open Air festival in Bad Berka, Germany. It was their first album in nine years since their 2000 album, On the Wings of Inferno, and their first album since 1992’s Last One on Earth to feature vocalist Martin van Drunen.

== Track listing ==
- All songs written and arranged by Asphyx.

No.	Title	Length
1.	"Scorbutics"	4:26
2.	"The Herald"	3:33
3.	"Bloodswamp"	3:56
4.	"Death The Brutal Way"	3:52
5.	"Asphyx II (They Died As They Marched)"	6:40
6.	"Eisenbahnmörser"	5:42
7.	"Black Hole Storm"	5:35
8.	"Riflegun Redeemer"	5:04
9.	"Cape Horn"	6:53
10.	"The Saw, The Torture, The Pain"	3:10
Total length:		48:51

== Personnel ==
Asphyx

- Martin van Drunen - lead vocals
- Paul Baayens - guitar
- Bob Bagchus - drums
- Wannes Gubbels - bass guitar, backing vocals

Production

- Frank Klein Douwel - engineering, recording
- Dan Swanö - mastering, mixing
- Mick Koopman - artwork
- Mira Born - photography
