= Erase (album) =

Studio album by Gorefest
- Released: July 1994
- Recorded: T & T Studio, Gelsenkirchen, Germany, January - March 1994; Studio Zeezicht, Spaarnwoude, Netherlands, January 1994
- Genre: Death metal, death 'n' roll
- Length: 42:10
- Label: Nuclear Blast
- Producer: Pete "Peewee" Coleman

Gorefest chronology
False (1992)	Erase (1994)	Soul Survivor (1996)

Professional ratings
Review scores
Source	Rating
AllMusic	4/5 stars

Erase is the third studio album by Dutch death metal band Gorefest. It was released in 1994 via Nuclear Blast. While primarily death metal, the album incorporates some slower and more mid-paced ideas reminiscent of heavy metal and is seen as a transition into the death 'n' roll sound heard on the band's later releases.

== Track listing ==
No.	Title	Length
1.	"Low"	5:01
2.	"Erase"	5:49
3.	"I Walk My Way"	4:33
4.	"Fear"	4:33
5.	"Seeds of Hate"	5:01
6.	"Peace of Paper"	4:34
7.	"Goddess in Black"	6:16
8.	"To Hell and Back"	6:23
9.	"Raven" (bonus track)	3:07
10.	"Horrors in a Retarded Mind '94" (bonus track)	3:54
Total length:		42:10

== Band members ==
- Jan Chris de Koeijer – vocals, bass guitar
- Frank Harthoorn – guitar
- Boudewijn Bonebakker – guitar
- Ed Warby – drums
