= Humiliation (band) =

Malaysian death metal band

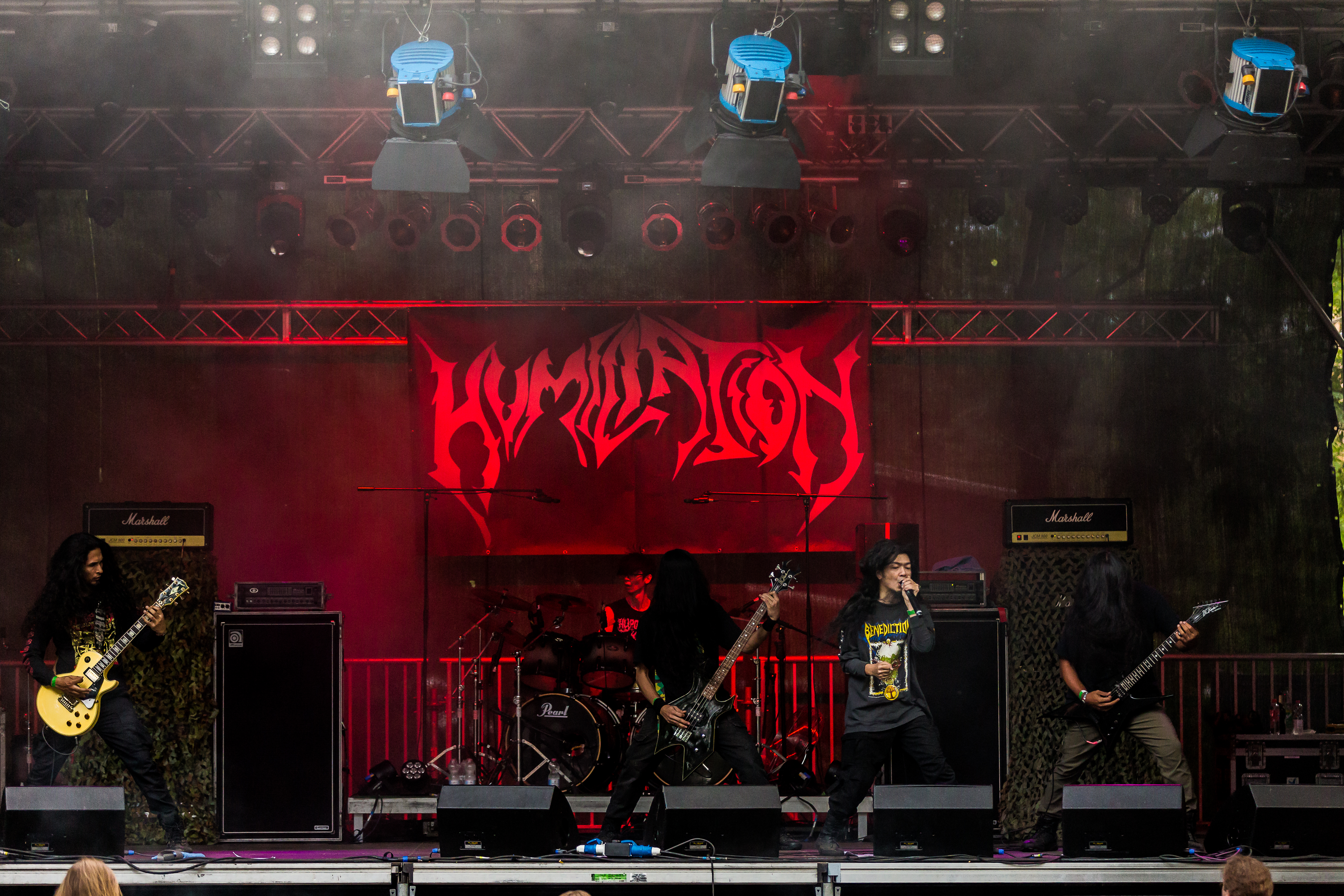
Humiliation in Germany, 2019.

Humiliation is a Malaysian death metal band.

The band was founded in 2009. Releasing albums frequently, their brand of death metal is slow and groovy in the vein of Bolt Thrower and Asphyx.

In the early-to-mid-2010s, the band often got less fortunate album reviews in Europe. Powermetal.de scored 2009's Face the Disaster as 4 out of 10; Metal.de gave that a 3, followed by 5 out of 10 to 2013's Turbulence From the Deep.

Norway's Scream Magazine gave 2015's Battalion a 2 out of 6 score. Wrote the reviewer, "the material is completely devoid of exciting elements and times where one gets carried away. The whole thing is so bereft of ideas that it is a crying shame". Metal Hammer Norway gave an even worse rating to Turbulence From the Deep, 2 out of 10. The reviewer detracted points for what he perceived boring and unoriginal fare.

Blabbermouth rated Turbulence From the Deep higher, 6 out of 10, and was joined by Rock Hard which bestowed the score 7 on both Face the Disaster and Battalion. Webzine Teeth of the Divine reviewed Humiliation's albums as consistently great.
