= Rise to Ruin =

Studio album by Gorefest
- Released: 3 August 2007
- Recorded: Excess Studios, Rotterdam, March 2007; Vocals recorded at Antfarm, Aarhus, April 2007 by Tue Madsen
- Genre: Death metal
- Length: 48:41
- Label: Nuclear Blast
- Producer: Gorefest

Gorefest chronology
La Muerte (2005)	Rise to Ruin (2007)

Professional ratings
Review scores
Source	Rating
AllMusic	4/5 stars

Rise to Ruin is the seventh and final studio album by Dutch death metal band Gorefest. It was released in 2007 through Nuclear Blast. The album was released on 25 September 2007 in the US.

== Track listing ==
1. "Revolt" – 5:27
2. "Rise to Ruin" – 4:48
3. "The War on Stupidity" – 4:14
4. "A Question of Terror" – 5:35
5. "Babylon's Whores" – 9:09
6. "Speak When Spoken To" – 4:19
7. "A Grim Charade" – 5:08
8. "Murder Brigade" – 4:15
9. "The End of It All" – 5:46

=== Bonus tracks digipak edition ===
10. "Surrealism" – 04:29
11. "Dehumanization" – 03:32

== Band members ==
- Jan Chris de Koeijer – vocals, bass guitar
- Frank Harthoorn – guitar
- Boudewijn Bonebakker – guitar
- Ed Warby – drums
- Jacob Bredhal – additional vocals on "Revolt" and "Speak When Spoken To"
