= Mindloss =

Studio album by Gorefest
- Released: 11 August 1991
- Recorded: Stonesound Studios, Roosendaal, Netherlands, 1991
- Genre: Death metal
- Length: 43:11
- Label: Foundation 2000 Records
- Producer: Colin Richardson

Gorefest chronology
Mindloss (1991)	False (1992)

Professional ratings
Review scores
Source	Rating
AllMusic	2.5/5 stars

Mindloss is the first studio album by Dutch death metal band Gorefest. It was released in 1991 by the small Dutch label Foundation 2000 Records and reissued by Nuclear Blast in 1993. It was reissued again in 2005 as a double-CD which includes the Tangled in Gore and Horrors in a Retarded Mind demos on disc two. The album was released in the US in 1992 by Pavement Music.

== Track listing ==
All songs written by Gorefest.

No.	Title	Length
1.	"Intro"	1:02
2.	"Mental Misery"	5:05
3.	"Putrid Stench of Human Remains"	4:18
4.	"Foetal Carnage"	5:02
5.	"Tangled in Gore"	4:34
6.	"Confessions of a Serial Killer"	5:33
7.	"Horrors in a Retarded Mind"	4:00
8.	"Loss of Flesh"	3:46
9.	"Decomposed"	5:51
10.	"Gorefest"	4:00
Total length:		43:11

== Personnel ==
Gorefest

- Jan-Chris de Koeijer – vocals, bass guitar
- Alex van Schaik – guitar
- Frank Harthoorn – guitar
- Marc Hoogendoorn – drums

Production

- Jan Chris de Koeijer – cover concept
- Pete Steward – engineering, mixing
- Willem Steentjes – engineering
- Mark Fritsma – executive producer
- Colin Richardson – producer
- Lupo – cover concept, design, layout, photography
