= La Muerte (album) =

Studio album by Gorefest
- Released: 28 October 2005
- Recorded: Netherlands
- Genre: Death metal
- Length: 64:39
- Label: Nuclear Blast

Gorefest chronology
Chapter 13 (1998)	La Muerte (2005)	Rise to Ruin (2007)

Professional ratings
Review scores
Source	Rating
AllMusic	2.5/5 stars

La Muerte (Spanish for "The Death") is the sixth studio album by Dutch death metal band Gorefest. It was Recorded in July 2005 at Excess Studios in Rotterdam, Holland, Netherlands. Mixed in August 2005 at Antfarm Studio in Aarhus, Denmark. Produced by Gorefest released in 2005 via Nuclear Blast. It was also released by Night of the Vinyl Dead in May 2006 as a double black vinyl with a colour insert, limited to 500 hand-numbered copies. This album is sees the band return to the death metal style of their early albums, like "False".

== Track listing ==
1. "For the Masses" – 4:47
2. "When the Dead Walk the Earth" – 4:46
3. "You Could Make Me Kill" – 5:45
4. "Malicious Intent" – 5:47
5. "Rogue State" – 7:09
6. "The Call" – 4:52
7. "Of Death and Chaos (A Grand Finale)" – 4:14
8. "Exorcism" – 4:09
9. "Man to Fall" – 3:50
10. "The New Gods" – 4:08
11. "'till Fingers Bleed" – 5:18
12. "La Muerte" – 9:54

== Band members ==
- Jan Chris de Koeijer – vocals, bass guitar
- Frank Harthoorn – guitar
- Boudewijn Bonebakker – guitar
- Ed Warby – drums
