= Soul Survivor (Gorefest album) =

Studio album by Gorefest
- Released: 19 April 1996
- Recorded: R.S. 29, Waalwijk, Netherlands; November–December 1995
- Genre: Death 'n' roll
- Length: 44:46
- Label: Nuclear Blast
- Producer: Oscar Holleman and Gorefest

Gorefest chronology
Erase (1994)	Soul Survivor (1996)	Chapter 13 (1998)

Professional ratings
Review scores
Source	Rating
AllMusic	4.5/5 stars

Soul Survivor is the fourth studio album by Dutch death metal band Gorefest, released in 1996 via Nuclear Blast. The album shows Gorefest moving into a hard rock-influenced sound, eschewing all elements of metal except for the death growls of Jan-Chris de Koeijer, thus this album is often regarded as an example of death 'n' roll.

== Track listing ==
1. "Freedom" (Boudewijn Bonebakker, Jan Chris de Koeyer, Ed Warby) 4:32
2. "Forty Shades" (Bonebakker, de Koeyer, Warby) 4:14
3. "River" (Bonebakker, de Koeyer, Warby) 4:33
4. "Electric Poet" (Bonebakker, de Koeyer, Warby) 4:20
5. "Soul Survivor" (Bonebakker, de Koeyer) 4:30
6. "Blood Is Thick" (de Koeyer, Frank Harthoon) 3:41
7. "Dog Day" (Bonebakker, de Koeyer, Harthoon) 2:51
8. "Demon Seed" (Bonebakker, de Koeyer, Warby) 3:46
9. "Chameleon" (Bonebakker, de Koeyer) 2:45
10. "Dragon Man" (Bonebakker, de Koeyer) 6:38

=== Bonus tracks ===
11. "Tired Moon" 4:26
12. "Goddess in Black" (orchestral version) 6:34

== Band members ==
- Jan-Chris de Koeijer – vocals, bass guitar
- Frank Harthoorn – guitar
- Boudewijn Bonebakker – guitar
- Ed Warby – drums
- Rene Merkelbach – mellotron and grand piano
