= Grand Supreme Blood Court =

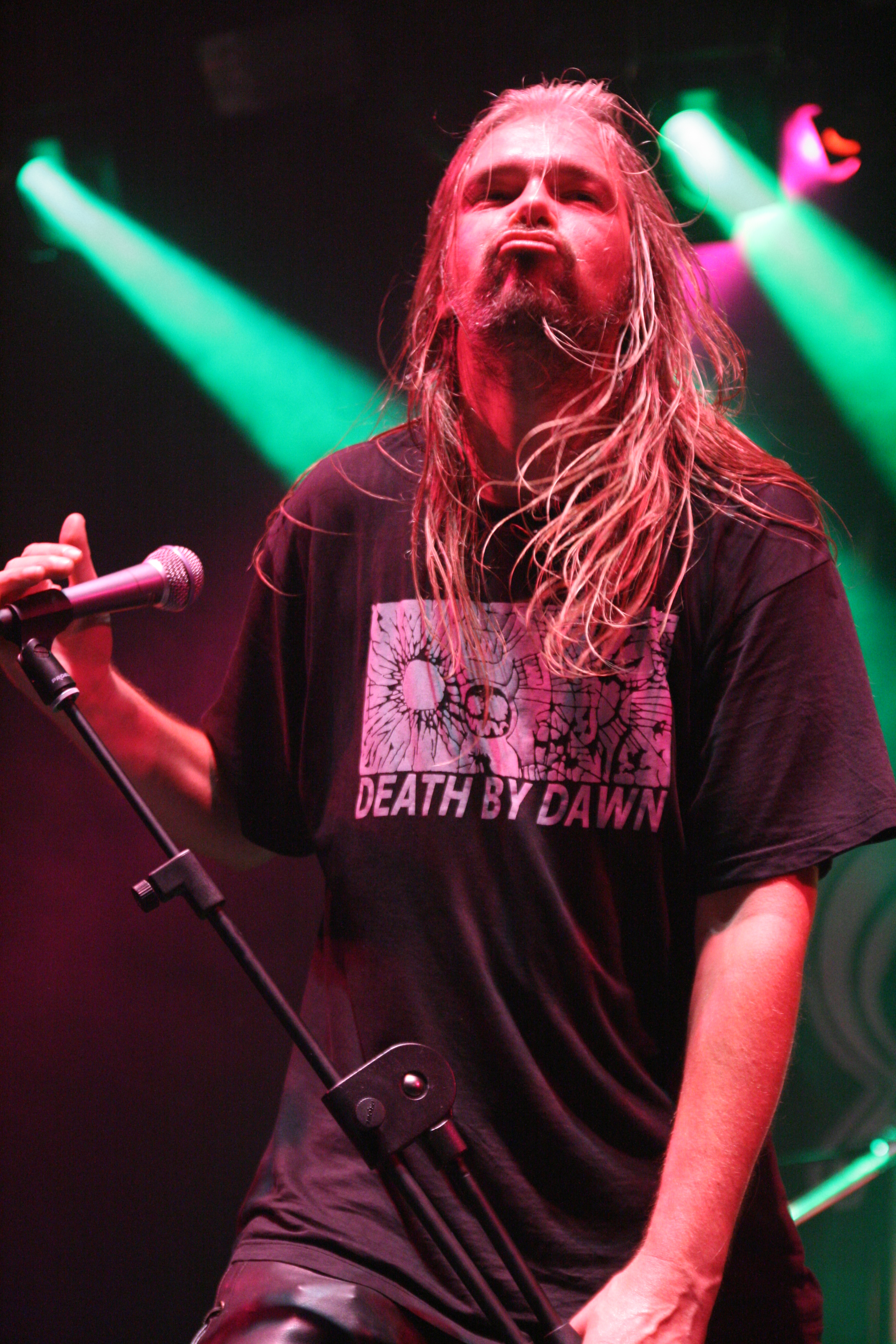

Background information
- Origin: Twente, Overijssel, Netherlands
- Genres: Death metal; death/doom
- Years active: 2009–present
- Labels: Century Media
- Spinoff of: Asphyx; Soulburn; Hail of Bullets; Bolt Thrower
- Members: Bob Bagchus; Eric Daniels; Alwin Zuur; Martin van Drunen; Remco Kreft
- Past members: Theo van Eekelen
- Website: Official Facebook page

Grand Supreme Blood Court are a Dutch death metal band from Twente, Overijssel. Their first studio album, Bow Down Before the Blood Court, was released through Century Media Records on 12 November 2012. They are currently working on their second album for a mid-to-late 2017 release., however, as of April 2018, its actual release window is unknown.

== Band members ==
Current

- Bob Bagchus (Grand Magistrate Bagchus) - drums (2009–present)
- Eric Daniels (Grand Judge Daniels) - guitars (2009–present)
- Alwin Zuur (Grand Registrar Zuur) - guitars (2009–present)
- Martin van Drunen (Grand Prosecutor van Drunen) - Vocals (2009–present)
- Remco Kreft (Grand Executioner Kreft) - bass (2013–present)

Former

- Theo van Eekelen (Grand Executioner van Eekelen) - bass (2009-2013)

== Discography ==
=== Studio albums ===
- Bow Down Before the Blood Court (2012)
