= Fable Frolic =

Studio album by Comecon
- Released: July 5, 1995
- Recorded: December 1994 at Sunlight Studios
- Genre: Death metal
- Length: 55:30
- Label: Century Media
- Producer: Tomas Skogsberg, Fred Estby

Comecon chronology
Converging Conspiracies (1993)	Fable Frolic (1995)

Fable Frolic is the third and final studio album by Swedish death metal band Comecon. It was released in 1995 via Century Media Records.

Contrary to the album credits, the drums were recorded using a drum computer; Jonas Fredriksson who is listed as a drummer does not exist. The vocals are handled by Marc Grewe of Morgoth.

== Track listing ==
No.	Title	Length
1.	"Soft, Creamy Lather"	3:49
2.	"How I Won the War"	3:17
3.	"Bovine Inspiration"	3:08
4.	"Frogs"	4:03
5.	"Ways of Wisdom" (Serves Two)	3:09
6.	"Propelling Scythes"	3:25
7.	"The Family Album"	2:49
8.	"Imploder"	3:14
9.	"It Wears Me Down"	2:40
10.	"Anaconda Charms Grass Snake"	3:20
11.	"Icons of Urine"	3:00
12.	"Sunday Stroll"	3:23
13.	"Canvas of History"	5:38
Total length:		46:55

Note: After the last track, "Canvas of History", there is roughly a minute of silence.

== Credits ==
- Rasmus Ekman – guitar, bass
- Pelle Ström – guitar, bass
- Marc Grewe – vocals
