= ...Of Frost and War =

Studio album by Hail of Bullets
- Released: May 12, 2008
- Studio: Excess Studios, Rotterdam, Holland
- Genre: Death metal
- Length: 52:50
- Label: Metal Blade Records
- Producer: Dan Swanö

Hail of Bullets chronology
...Of Frost and War (2008)	On Divine Winds (2010)

Professional ratings
Review scores
Source	Rating
About.com	4/5 stars
AllMusic	3.5/5 stars

...Of Frost and War is the debut studio album by Dutch death metal band Hail of Bullets. It was released on May 12, 2008, by Metal Blade Records.

The album is a concept album about the fighting in the Eastern Front of World War II between German and Soviet forces, starting with Operation Barbarossa and ending with the Battle of Berlin.

== Track listing ==
All lyrics are written by Hail of Bullets; all music is composed by Hail of Bullets

No.	Title	Length
1.	"Before the Storm (Barbarossa)"	2:00
2.	"Ordered Eastward" (featuring Dan Swanö)	4:42
3.	"The Lake Ladoga Massacre"	4:45
4.	"General Winter"	5:52
5.	"Advancing Once More"	5:07
6.	"Red Wolves of Stalin"	5:06
7.	"Nachthexen"	4:25
8.	"The Crucial Offensive (19-11-1942, 7.30 AM)"	4:21
9.	"Stalingrad"	5:03
10.	"Inferno at the Carpathian Mountains"	4:58
11.	"Berlin"	6:31
Total length:		52:50

== Personnel ==
Hail of Bullets

- Martin van Drunen - vocals
- Stephan Gebedi - guitars
- Paul Baayens - guitars
- Ed Warby - drums
- Theo van Eekelen - bass

Production

- Mick Koopman - artwork
- Hans Pieters - engineering, engineering (vocals)
- Dan Swanö - mastering, mixing
- Eugene Straver - photography
- Chris van der Valk - engineering (vocals)
