= Comecon (band) =

Swedish death metal band

- Origin: Stockholm, Sweden
- Genres: Death metal
- Years active: 1990–1995
- Labels: Century Media, Chicken Brain
- Members: Rasmus Ekman; Pelle Ström
- Past members: Lars-Göran Petrov; Martin van Drunen; Marc Grewe
- Website: www.abc.se/~re/COMECON/Comecon.html

Comecon was a Swedish death metal project founded in 1990. The band consisted of two guitarists, a drum computer, and a different session singer on each album. The debut album featured the Swede Lars-Göran Petrov, who was dismissed from Entombed. Their second album was sung by Dutchman Martin van Drunen (Asphyx). German Marc Grewe, from Morgoth, handled vocals on their final album. Tomas Skogsberg produced all three albums.

== Discography ==
- Split album with Merciless (1991)
- Megatrends in Brutality (1992)
- Converging Conspiracies (1993)
- Fable Frolic (1995)

== Members ==
- Rasmus Ekman – guitar, bass
- Pelle Ström – guitar, bass
- Lars-Göran Petrov – vocals (1992)
- Martin van Drunen – vocals (1993)
- Marc Grewe – vocals (1995)
