= Converging Conspiracies =

Studio album by Comecon
- Released: 9 November 1993
- Recorded: August–September 1993 at Sunlight Studios
- Genre: Death metal
- Length: 45:11
- Label: Century Media
- Producer: Tomas Skogsberg

Comecon chronology
Megatrends in Brutality (1992)	Converging Conspiracies (1993)	Fable Frolic (1995)

Converging Conspiracies is the second album by the Swedish death metal band Comecon, through Century Media Records. It was released in 1993. Contrary to the album credits, the drums were recorded using a drum computer; Fredrik Pålsson who is listed as a drummer does not exist. The photograph shows an unrecognizable friend of the band. The cover art is the painting The (Little) Tower of Babel by Pieter Bruegel the Elder.

== Track listing ==
No.	Title	Length
1.	"Democrator"	4:15
2.	"The Ethno-Surge"	3:13
3.	"Community"	3:43
4.	"Aerie"	4:21
5.	"Bleed/Burn"	3:52
6.	"Morticide"	3:24
7.	"Worms"	3:35
8.	"Pinhole View"	3:31
9.	"The Whole World"	4:06
10.	"God Told Me To" (Dr. Know cover)	2:02
11.	"Dipstick"	3:59
12.	"The House That Man Built"	5:10
Total length:		49:11

== Credits ==
- Rasmus Ekman – guitar, bass
- Pelle Ström – guitar, bass
- Martin van Drunen – vocals
