= Roterfeld =

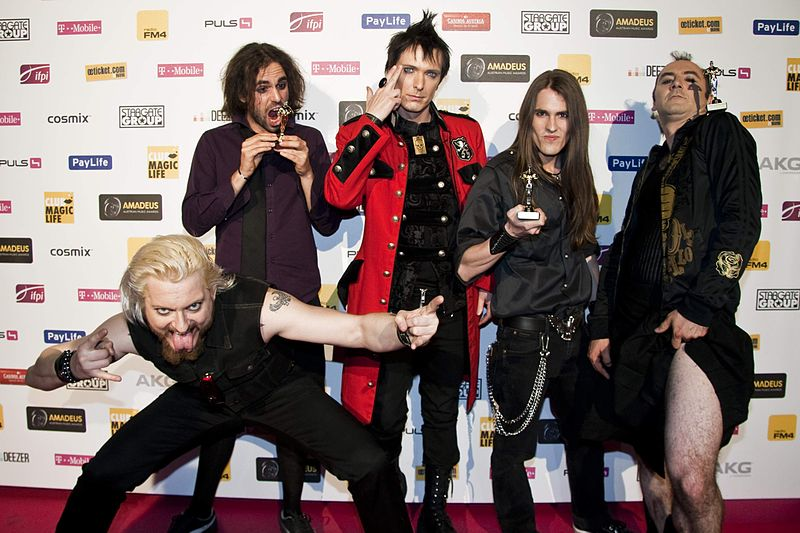
- Roterfeld at the Amadeus Awards 2012

Background information
- Genres: Dark Rock
- Years active: 2011–present
- Members: Aaron Roterfeld; Marc Filler; Amandas Nadel; Thomas Pfaller; André Schwarz
- Website: www.roterfeld.com

Roterfeld is a rock band from Vorarlberg, Austria, founded in 1990 by singer and front-man Aaron Roterfeld.

== History ==
The band started as a solo act with Aaron Roterfeld producing its debut album, Blood Diamond Romance, with producers including the Berman Brothers, Hiili Hiilesmaa and Frank Bornemann. On September 20, 2011, Roterfeld's first music video for the single "Great New Life" appeared. Finally, on October 14, 2011, Roterfeld's debut album, Blood Diamond Romance, was released. His song, "Stop", debuted at No. 3 in the German Club Charts (DAC) and in the following weeks, climbed to number 2. It was the highest chart entry ever for an Austrian artist in the German Club Charts.

In November 2011, "Great New Life" was selected for the film The Twilight Saga: Breaking Dawn – Part 1, leading Roterfeld to start an Unplugged - Tour through Austrian cinemas by playing "Great New Life" before the film screenings. He traveled to Innsbruck, Vienna, Graz, Salzburg and Linz. On tour, Roterfeld worked with guitarist Marc Filler, who had previously collaborated with him on the debut album. Roterfeld was voted "Best Newcomer 2011" by the readers of Sonic Seducer.

On May 1, 2012, the music video for Don't Be Afraid of the Dark was released. This video featured Amandas Nadel, Thomas Pfaller, Andre Schwarz and Leandra Ophelia Dax. From then on, they were officially members of the live band. Their live debut took place in the Remise in Bludenz on June 6, 2012. It was followed by appearances at major events such as Nova Rock, Blackfield Festival, M'era Luna Festival, Summer Breeze and the Dark Storm Festival. For unknown reasons Dax no longer left after the Summer Breeze Festival. Nevertheless, this group remained one of the best newcomers of 2011.

== Awards ==
In 2012, Roterfeld was nominated for the Amadeus Austrian Music Award 2012 in the category "Hard & Heavy".

== Style ==
Their music is a mix of Dark Rock and Alternative Pop.

The music on the album Blood Diamond Romance ranges from hard distorted guitar riffs, to orchestral sounds and synthesizer, to purely acoustic songs. The songs are composed exclusively by Aaron Roterfeld. Apart from one exception, the lyrics are in English. The song Don't Be Afraid of the Dark has been released in a German version.

== Discography ==
=== Albums ===
- Blood Diamond Romance (October 14, 2011, Premium Records/Soulfood)
- Don't Be Afraid of The Dark (Released in 2011)
- Sealed With a Kiss (Released in 2011)
- Going Down (Released in 2011)
- You and Me in Agony (Released in 2011)
- Stop (Released in 2011)
- Blood Diamond Romance II (Released in 2011)

=== Singles ===
- "Great New Life" (September 30, 2011, Premium Records/Soulfood)

== Movies ==
From September 27 to 29, 2012, Roterfeld played the song "Great New Life" for the film Edge Becs by the Viennese filmmaker Harald Huto on the roof of the Vienna Sargfabrik.

The independent film was released in February 2013. In the movie Aaron Roterfeld also plays a small supporting role in which he meets the pop singer Falco in a fictional situation in the Vienna Drahdiwaberlgasse.
