= False (album) =

Studio album by Gorefest
- Released: 15 October 1992
- Recorded: Ron Konings' studio, Vrouwenpolder, Netherlands
- Genre: Death metal
- Length: 46:07
- Label: Nuclear Blast
- Producer: Colin Richardson

Gorefest chronology
Mindloss (1991)	False (1992)	Erase (1994)

Professional ratings
Review scores
Source	Rating
AllMusic	4/5 stars

False is the second studio album by Dutch death metal band Gorefest. It was released in 1992 via Nuclear Blast.

== Track listing ==
No.	Title	Length
1.	"The Glorious Dead"	4:36
2.	"State of Mind"	5:37
3.	"Reality - When You Die"	6:33
4.	"Get-A-Life"	4:27
5.	"False"	4:37
6.	"Second Face"	5:18
7.	"Infamous Existence"	5:41
8.	"From Ignorance to Oblivion"	5:00
9.	"The Mass Insanity"	4:18
Total length:		46:07

Digipak edition
No.	Title	Length
10.	"Tired Moon"
11.	"Reality - When You Die / Forty Shades" (live)
12.	"Demon Seed" (live)
13.	"Erase" (live)
14.	"Goddess in Black" (live)

== Personnel ==
Gorefest

- Jan-Chris de Koeijer – vocals, bass
- Frank Harthoorn – guitar
- Boudewijn Bonebakker – guitar
- Ed Warby – drums

Production

- Hannah Bear – photography
- Mid – cover art
- Repro Desaster – artwork (cover realization)
- Markus Staiger – executive producer
- Pete Coleman – engineering, mixing
- Colin Richardson – engineering, producer, recording
- Ton Homans – photography
