= Asphyx (album) =

Studio album by Asphyx
- Released: July 16, 1994
- Recorded: January and February 1994
- Studio: "Stage One Studio", Bühne, Germany
- Genre: Death metal; death-doom
- Length: 59:18
- Label: Century Media
- Producer: Asphyx & Andy Classen

Asphyx chronology
Last one on Earth (1992)	Asphyx (1994)	God Cries (1996)

Asphyx is the third studio album by Dutch death metal band Asphyx. It was released by Century Media Records in 1994. It is the band’s second and last album with Ron van Paul on bass, the only album with van Paul on vocals, and the only album to feature drummer Sander van Hoof and keyboardist Heiko Hanke.

The song “Valleys In Oblivion” was used in The Inbetweeners in the episode Spa Time.

== Track listing ==
No.	Title	Length
1.	"Prelude of the Unhonoured Funeral"	3:54
2.	"Depths of Eternity"	7:01
3.	"Emperors of Salvation"	4:59
4.	"'Til Death Do Us Apart"	6:17
5.	"Initiation into the Ossuary"	9:49
6.	"Incarcerated Chimaeras"	5:01
7.	"Abomination Echoes"	2:43
8.	"Back into Eternity"	6:43
9.	"Valleys in Oblivion"	7:16
10.	"Thoughts of an Atheist"	5:23
Total length:		59:18

== Personnel ==
=== Asphyx ===
- Sander van Hoof - drums
- Eric Daniels - guitars
- Ron van Pol - bass, vocals
- Heiko Hanke - keyboards

=== Additional personnel ===
- Tony Brookhuis - lead guitar and intro on "Thoughts of an Atheist"

Production

- Andy Classen - producer, mixing, engineering
- Axel Hermann - cover art
- R. Kampf - executive producer

(Note: Sander van Hoof is actually Roel Sanders (at the time also in Malignant together with Ron van Pol so they choose this "stage name")
