= Embrace the Death =

Studio album by Asphyx
- Released: November 19, 1996
- Recorded: 1990 (Tracks 1–12); 1989 at Frankie's Recording Kitchen in Nieuwleusen, Netherlands (Tracks 13–14)
- Genre: Death metal; death-doom
- Length: 51:58
- Label: Century Media

Asphyx chronology
God Cries (1996)	Embrace the Death (1996)	On the Wings of Inferno (2000)

Embrace the Death is a rough mix and the fifth studio album by Dutch death metal band Asphyx. It was recorded in 1990 and intended as their first album, but it was not released. In 1996, Century Media Records eventually released this album, including the Mutilating Process EP.

== Track listing ==
No.	Title	Length
1.	"Intro"	1:21
2.	"Embrace the Death"	4:01
3.	"The Sickened Dwell"	3:58
4.	"Streams of Ancient Wisdom"	3:25
5.	"Thoughts of an Atheist"	4:59
6.	"Crush the Cenotaph"	4:25
7.	"Denying the Goat"	3:48
8.	"Vault of the Vailing Souls"	5:03
9.	"Circle of the Secluded"	5:35
10.	"To Succubus a Whore"	1:57
11.	"Eternity's Depths"	3:40
12.	"Outro"	0:50
13.	"Mutilating Process"	4:27
14.	"Streams of Ancient Wisdom"	4:29
Total length:		51:58

== Personnel ==
- Theo Loomans – vocals, bass guitar
- Eric Daniels – guitar
- Bob Bagchus – drums
