= Bow Down Before the Blood Court =

Studio album by Grand Supreme Blood Court
- Released: 9 November 2012 (Germany), 12 November 2012 (Europe), 20 November 2012 (North America)
- Genre: Death metal, death/doom
- Length: 48:55
- Label: Century Media Records

Professional ratings
Review scores
Source	Rating
Metal Forces	9/10 stars
Blistering	8/10 stars
Metal Temple	7/10 stars
Metal Underground	3.5/5 stars

Bow Down Before the Blood Court is the first studio album by Dutch death metal band Grand Supreme Blood Court. It was released on 12 November 2012 through Century Media Records. The album was made available on CD, vinyl and digital download.

== Track listing ==
No.	Title	Length
1.	"All Rise!"	04:25
2.	"Bow Down Before the Blood Court"	03:46
3.	"There Shall Be No Acquittance"	03:31
4.	"Veredictum Sanguis"	05:05
5.	"Behead the Defence"	03:06
6.	"Grand Justice, Grand Pain (instrumental)"	02:14
7.	"Fed to the Boars"	04:19
8.	"Circus of Mass Torment"	05:08
9.	"Public Castration"	03:06
10.	"Piled Up for the Scavengers"	04:21
11.	"...and Thus the Billions Shall Burn"	09:54
Total length:		48:55

== Personnel ==
Grand Supreme Blood Court

- Theo van Eekelen - bass
- Martin van Drunen - vocals
- Alwin Zuur - guitars
- Eric Daniels - guitars
- Bob Bagchus - drums

Miscellaneous staff

- Mick Koopman - logo
- Lena Wurm - layout
- Frank Klein Douwel - engineering
- Harry Wijering - engineering
- Dan Swanö - mixing, mastering
- Axel Hermann - cover art
- Jeanette "Jeanny" Petrocchi - photography
