= Deathhammer =

Studio album by Asphyx
- Released: February 27, 2012 (Europe); February 28, 2012 (USA)
- Studios: Harrow Studio (drums and vocals); The Morser Studio (guitars and bass)
- Genres: Death metal; death-doom
- Length: 47:18
- Label: Century Media
- Producer: Asphyx

Asphyx chronology
| Death...The Brutal Way (2009) | Deathhammer (2012) | Incoming Death (2016) |

Professional ratings
Review scores
| Source | Rating |
|---|---|
| Blabbermouth | 8.5/10 |
| Exclaim! | Favourable |
| Metal Hammer Germany | 6/7 |
| Metal.de | 9/10 |
| Powermetal.de | 9/10 |
| Rock Hard | 9.5/10 |

Deathhammer is the eighth studio album by Dutch death-doom band Asphyx. The album was released on February 27, 2012 in Europe and February 28, 2012 in USA through Century Media. It is also the last studio album to feature founding member Bob Bagchus, who left from the band in order to spend more time with his family and replaced by Stefan Hüskens. Deathhammer received very good reviews in the metal press.

== Track listing ==
| No. | Title | Length |
|---|---|---|
| 1. | "Into the Timewastes" | 3:40 |
| 2. | "Deathhammer" | 2:27 |
| 3. | "Minefield" | 7:28 |
| 4. | "Of Days When Blades Turned Blunt" | 3:22 |
| 5. | "Der Landser" | 6:54 |
| 6. | "Reign of the Brute" | 2:59 |
| 7. | "The Flood" | 3:03 |
| 8. | "We Doom You to Death" | 6:44 |
| 9. | "Vespa Crabro" | 2:50 |
| 10. | "As the Magma Mammoth Rises" | 7:51 |
| Total length: | | 47:18 |

Jewelcase CD preorder version bonus tracks
| No. | Title | Length |
|---|---|---|
| 11. | "Death the Brutal Way" (7" Version, 2008) | 3:38 |
| 12. | "Os Abysmi Vel Daath" (Celtic Frost cover, 7" 2008) | 4:52 |

Limited edition mediabook bonus disc
| No. | Title | Length |
|---|---|---|
| 1. | "Der Landser" (German Version) | 6:56 |
| 2. | "Death the Brutal Way" (2008 version) | 3:39 |
| 3. | "Os Abysmi Vel Daath" (Celtic Frost cover) | 4:52 |
| 4. | "Bestial Vomit" (Majesty cover) | 2:59 |
| 5. | "We Doom You to Death" (2010 version) | 6:43 |

== Personnel ==
=== Asphyx ===
- Martin van Drunen - Vocals
- Paul Baayens - Guitars
- Alwin Zuur - Bass
- Bob Bagchus - Drums

=== Production ===
- Paul Baayens – recording (guitars and bass)
- Harry Wijering – recording (drums and vocals)
- Dan Swanö – mixing, mastering
- Axel Hermann – cover artwork, illustrations, handwriting
- Carsten Drescher – layout
- César Valladares – inlay illustrations
