= Blockheads (French band) =

French heavy metal band

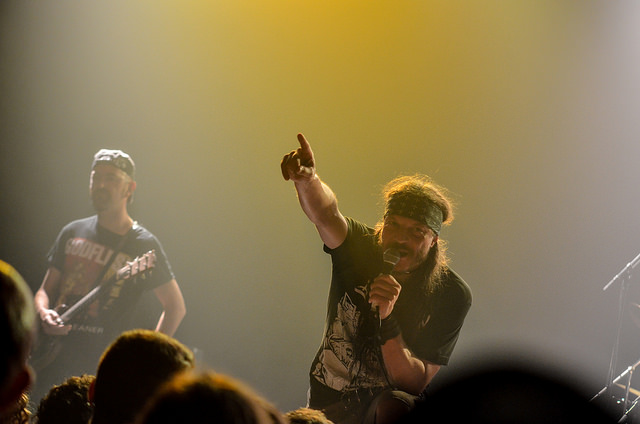
- Blockheads at Rock Your Brain on 18 October 2014

Background information
- Origin: Nancy, France
- Genres: Grindcore
- Years active: 1992–present
- Labels: Bones Brigade; Overcome Records
- Members: Xavier Chevalier (vocals); Fred (guitar); Raphael (guitar); Raph (bass); Nico (drums)
- Past members: Ben (guitar); Xaxa (bass); Oli (drums); Pierre (guitar); Bruno (bass); Benoît (drums); Ludo (guitar); Payot (bass); Antoine (guitar)
- Website: blockheads-grindcore.fr

Blockheads are a French grindcore band.

== Band history ==
Blockheads were formed in 1992 and released their first demo, Haaashaastaak, in 1993. In 1995, they released their first studio album, Last Tribes, and another album, Watch Out, followed in 1998. This achievement was made after the band had experienced some line-up difficulties.

In 2000, Blockheads signed with Bones Brigade, a label which specializes in extreme music. Their first two albums were re-released together on Bones Brigade under the title, From Womb to Genocide. A third album was released in 2001, Human Parade, and in the next few years, the band participated in numerous festivals, causing them to become known as an important grindcore band in the European extreme music scene. The band is still actively touring as of 2024.

During their career, the band has played concerts with such notable acts as Napalm Death, Nasum, Obituary, Entombed, Sick of it All, Carcass, and Soulfly.

== Current lineup ==
- Xavier "Xav" Chevalier - vocals (1992–present)
- Fred - guitar, vocals (1992–present)
- Nico - drums, vocals (1997–present)
- Erik - bass, vocals (2008–present)
- Raphaël Fazi - guitar (2002–2012, 2020–present)

== Past members ==
- Oli - drums (1992-1993)
- Ben - guitar, vocals (1992-1996)
- Benoit - drums, vocals (1994-1996)
- Ludo - guitar, vocals (1997-1999)
- Payot - bass, vocals (1997-2002)
- Antoine Bussière - guitar, vocals (2002-2004)
- Raph "Faz" - bass, vocals (2002-2008)
- Raph Junior - guitar (2005-2009)

== Discography ==
- Haaashaastaak demo (1993)
- Last Tribes LP (1995, self-produced)
- Blockheads/Mastic Scum split 7-inch with Mastic Scum (1997, Stuhlgang Records)
- Watch Out LP (1998, self-produced)
- From Womb to Genocide LP (2000, Bones Brigade)
- Human Parade LP (2001, Bones Brigade)
- Blockheads/Nostromo split with Nostromo (2002, Shogun Records)
- Shapes of Misery LP (2006, Overcome Records)
- The World is Dead LP (2013)
- Trip To The Void (2021, Bones Brigade Records and LIXIVIAT Records)
