= Mysticum =

Norwegian industrial black metal band

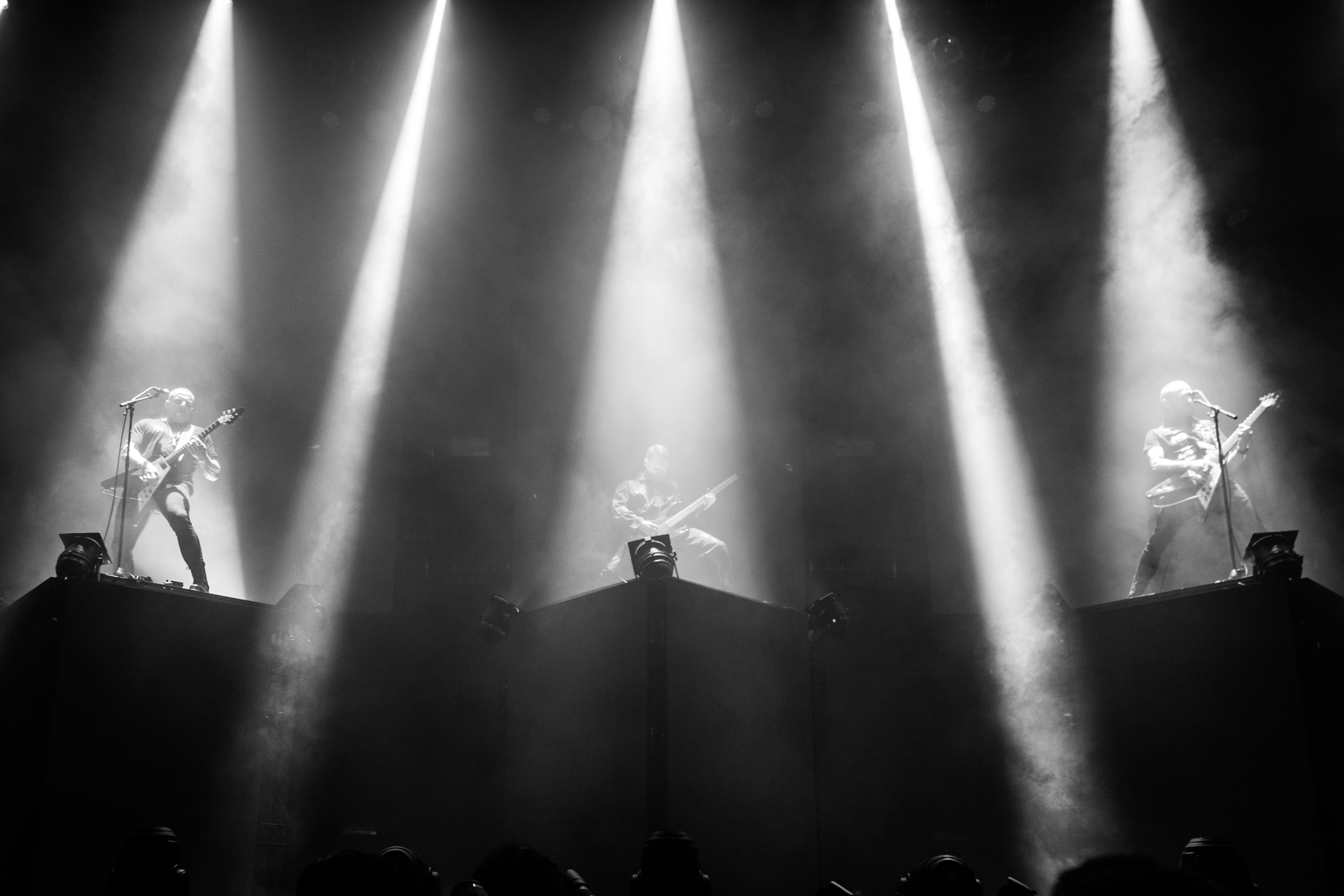
- Mysticum at Roadburn Festival 2017

Background information
- Origin: Asker, Norway
- Genres: Industrial black metal
- Years active: 1992-present
- Label: Peaceville Records
- Members: Preben «Prime Evil» Mulvik, Benny «Herr General Cerastes» Laumann, Robin «Dr. Best» Malmberg
- Past members: Jan Axel «Hellhammer» Blomberg, Ivar Bjørnson
- Website: www.mysticum.com

Mysticum is a Norwegian industrial black metal band from Asker. They formed in 1992 under the name Sabazios, but changed shortly after with the demo release of "Medusa's Tears" in 1993. They are known as pioneers of the industrial black metal subgenre.

== Line-up ==
=== Current ===
- Preben "Prime Evil" Mulvik, also known as "Ravn" or "Svartravn" (Raven) - vocals, guitar
- Benny "Herr General Cerastes" Laumann - vocals, guitar, programming
- Robin "Dr. Best" Malmberg - bass guitar, programming

=== Past ===
- Jan Axel "Hellhammer" Blomberg - drums (Never recorded. As stated by the band, computer-controlled drums is created with the sound to match their style. Hellhammer was just briefly in the band's line-up.)
- Ivar Bjørnson - guitars

== Discography ==
Name	Year	Type
Medusa's Tears	1993	Demo
Wintermass	1993	Demo
Mysticum / Ulver	1994	Split album with Ulver
Piss Off!!!	1995	Demo
Mysticum (Best Of)	1995	Compilation
In the Streams of Inferno	1996	Full studio album
Black Magic Mushrooms / The Habit of Fear	2003	Split album with Audiopain
Lost Masters of the Universe	2004	Compilation
Planet Satan	2014	Full studio album
Never Stop the Madness: The Roadburn Inferno	2018	Live album
