= Megatrends in Brutality =

Studio album by Comecon
- Released: 25 August 1992
- Recorded: May–June 1991 at Sunlight Studios
- Genre: Death metal
- Length: 40:16
- Label: Century Media
- Producer: Tomas Skogsberg

Comecon chronology
Megatrends in Brutality (1992)	Converging Conspiracies (1993)

Megatrends in Brutality is the debut album of the Swedish death metal band Comecon. It was released in 1992 on Century Media Records. Contrary to the album credits, the drums were recorded using a drum machine; Anders Green who is listed as a drummer does not exist. The photograph shows an unrecognizable friend of the band. The order of the tracks on the album sleeve is wrong; the correct order is shown below.

== Track listing ==
1. "The Dogdays" – 3:01
2. "Wash away the Filth" – 3:31
3. "Slope" – 3:12
4. "Teuton Tantrums" – 3:13
5. "The Mule" – 2:17
6. "Armed Solution" – 4:36
7. "The Future Belongs to Us" – 3:45
8. "Conductor of Ashes" – 3:51
9. "Good Boy Benito" – 3:57
10. "Omnivorous Excess" – 4:10
11. "Ulcer" – 4:16

== Credits ==
- Rasmus Ekman – guitar, bass
- Pelle Ström – guitar, bass
- Lars-Göran Petrov – vocals
