= The Rack (album) =

Studio album by Asphyx
- Released: 13 April 1991
- Recorded: Harrow Production, Losser, Holland.
- Genre: Death metal; death-doom
- Length: 37:33
- Label: Century Media
- Producer: Harry Wijering, Robert Kampf

Asphyx chronology
Mutilating Process (1989)	The Rack (1991)	Crush the Cenotaph (1992)

Professional ratings
Review scores
Source	Rating
AllMusic	3/5 stars

The Rack is the debut studio album by Dutch death metal band Asphyx. It was released in 1991 by Century Media Records. This is the band’s only studio album to feature vocalist Martin van Drunen additionally playing bass.

== Track listing ==
No.	Title	Length
1.	"The Quest of Absurdity"	1:21
2.	"Vermin"	4:02
3.	"Diabolical Existence"	3:55
4.	"Evocation"	5:31
5.	"Wasteland of Terror"	2:16
6.	"The Sickening Dwell"	4:15
7.	"Ode to a Nameless Grave" (instrumental)	2:55
8.	"Pages in Blood"	4:08
9.	"The Rack"	9:06
Total length:		37:33

2006 Re-release Bonus Live Tracks
No.	Title	Length
10.	"The Quest for Absurdity"	0:30
11.	"Vermin"	3:46
12.	"Evocation"	4:57
13.	"Diabolical Existence"	3:22
14.	"Ode to a Nameless Grave"	2:26
15.	"The Sickening Dwell"	3:51
16.	"Wasteland of Terror"	2:31
17.	"Pages in Blood"	4:06
18.	"The Rack"	8:17
19.	"Rite of Shades"	3:52
20.	"Crush the Cenotaph"	4:01

== Personnel ==
Asphyx

- Martin van Drunen - vocals, bass guitar
- Eric Daniels - guitar
- Bob Bagchus - drums

Production

- Robert Kampf - executive producer
- Harry Wijering - mixing, producer
- Marion Wiggers - photography
- Martin van Drunen - lyrics
- Theo Loomans - lyrics
- Axel Hermann - cover art
