= Morifade =

Swedish power metal band

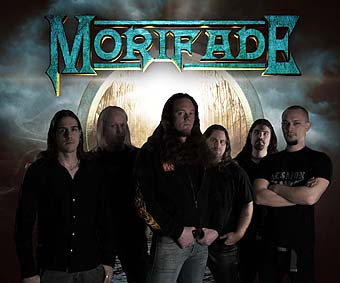

Background information
- Origin: Linköping, Sweden
- Genres: Power metal
- Years active: 1992–2015
- Labels: Loud N' Proud Records; Hammerheart Records; Karmageddon Media; IceWarrior Records/Alive; Candlelight Records
- Past members: Kristian Wallin; Robin Arnell; Mathias Kamijo; Henrik Weimedal; Kim Arnell; Fredrik Eriksson; Stefan Petersson; Jesper Johansson; Fredrik Johansson; Adrian Kanebäck; Christian Stinga-Borg
- Website: morifade.com

Morifade was a power metal band formed in 1992 in Linköping, Sweden.

== Biography ==
The band was first formed under the name Gothic by Jesper Johansson (lead vocals and guitar), Fredrik Johansson (guitar) and Kim Arnell (drums). Soon after, they were joined by Henrik Weimedal (bass). In late 1996, Christian Stinga-Borg joined the band as lead vocalist and Johansson became a full-time guitarist. In 1998, they issued the EP Across the Starlit Sky under the new moniker Morifade.

Shortly after the EP was released, Stinga-Borg departed and was replaced by Stefan Petersson. This lineup released the full-length album Possession of Power in 1999. Later that year, Fredrik Johansson departed and was replaced by ex-Nephenzy guitarist Adrian Kanebäck, and the band added keyboardist Fredrik Eriksson. The EP Cast a Spell was released in 2000. Kanebäck then left the band and was replaced by Robin Arnell (Kim Arnell's younger brother).

Morifade signed to Hammerheart Records and released the album Imagainarium in 2002. The band then moved to Candlelight Records and released Domi<>Nation in 2004. This was a loose concept album based on Brave New World and 1984. AllMusic called the album "the sort of grandiose, overblown power metal offering that most rock critics -- not all, but most -- loved to hate back in the '70s and '80s."

In 2004, Petersson left and was replaced by Kristian Wallin. Jesper Johansson also quit the band and was replaced by former Pain and Hypocrisy guitarist Mathias Kamijo. After a seven-year hiatus, Morifade released the album Empire of Souls in 2011. The band broke up in 2015, with Robin Arnell, Mathias Kamijo, and Kim Arnell forming the new band Prime Creation in 2017.

== Discography ==
- The Hourglass (1995)
- Across the Starlit Sky (1998)
- Possession of Power (1999)
- Cast a Spell (2000)
- Imaginarium (2002)
- Domi<>Nation (2004)
- Empire of Souls (2011)

== Members ==
- Kim Arnell, drums (1992–2015)
- Henrik Weimedal, bass (1992–2015)
- Fredrik "Frippe" Eriksson, keyboards (1999–2015)
- Robin Arnell, guitars (2001–2015)
- Kristian Wallin, vocals (2004–2015)
- Mathias Kamijo, guitars (2005–2015)

Former members

- Christian Stinga-Borg, vocals (1992–1998)
- Fredrik Johansson, vocals, guitars (1992–1999)
- Jesper Johansson, guitars (1992–2005)
- Adrian Kanebäck, guitars (1999–2001)
- Stefan Petersson, vocals (1998–2004)
