= Crush the Cenotaph =

EP by Asphyx
- Released: June 20, 1992
- Recorded: Woodhouse Studio, Dortmund 1991; November 30, 1991, in Stockholm, Sweden
- Genre: Death-doom
- Length: 21:30
- Label: Century Media

Asphyx chronology
The Rack (1991)	Crush the Cenotaph (1992)	Last One on Earth (1992)

Crush the Cenotaph is an EP by Dutch death metal band Asphyx. It was released in 1992 by Century Media Records.

== Track listing ==
No.	Title	Length
1.	"Crush the Cenotaph"	3:55
2.	"Rite of Shades"	3:08
3.	"The Krusher"	5:59
4.	"Evocation" (live)	5:38
5.	"Wasteland of Terror" (live)	2:50
Total length:		21:30

Tracks 1, 2 and 3 were recorded at Woodhouse Studio, Dortmund, 1991.
Tracks 4 and 5 were recorded live on November 30, 1991, in Stockholm, Sweden.

== Personnel ==
- Martin van Drunen - vocals, bass guitar
- Eric Daniels - guitar
- Bob Bagchus - drums
