= Last One on Earth =

Studio album by Asphyx
- Released: October 1, 1992
- Recorded: 1992
- Studio: Harrows Studios in Netherlands
- Genre: Death metal; death-doom
- Length: 40:11
- Label: Century Media
- Producer: Asphyx, Harry Wijering

Asphyx chronology
Crush the Cenotaph (1992)	Last One on Earth (1992)	Asphyx (1994)

Last One on Earth is the second studio album by Dutch death metal band Asphyx. It was released in 1992 by Century Media Records. The album was ranked the 15th greatest death metal album of the 1990s by Kerrang!, who commented, "The band’s use of calculated stomping rhythms makes the album creepy and agonising".

== Background ==
Martin van Drunen recorded the vocals alone in the studio without realizing he was already booted from the band. The vocals were intended to be recorded by new bassist Ron van Pol. However, the other members of Asphyx thought the vocal tracks were fine with Martin singing so they were kept and the lyrics to be sung by van Pol were yet to be written so van Drunen's lyrics were kept as well.

== Track listing ==
No.	Title	Length
1.	"M.S. Bismarck"	5:03
2.	"The Krusher"	5:52
3.	"Serenade in Lead"	3:28
4.	"Last One on Earth"	7:10
5.	"The Incarnation of Lust"	4:47
6.	"Streams of Ancient Wisdom"	3:36
7.	"Food for the Ignorant"	4:49
8.	"Asphyx (Forgotten War)"	5:26
Total length:		40:11

== Personnel ==
Asphyx

- Martin van Drunen - vocals
- Ron van Pol - bass guitar
- Eric Daniels - guitar
- Bob Bagchus - drums

Production

- Harry Wijering - Engineering, Producer
- Stefanie Esser - Photography
- Claus C. Pilz - Layout
- Axel Hermann - Cover art
