= On the Wings of Inferno =

Studio album by Asphyx
- Released: 27 March 2000
- Recorded: November–December 1999
- Studio: Harrow Production Studio, Losser, Netherlands
- Genre: Death metal; death-doom
- Length: 29:11
- Label: Century Media
- Producer: Erik de Boer, Harry Wijering

Asphyx chronology
Embrace the Death (1996)	On the Wings of Inferno (2000)	Death...The Brutal Way (2009)

On the Wings of Inferno is the sixth studio album by Dutch death metal band Asphyx. It was released in 2000 by Century Media Records. Short after its release, Asphyx disbanded again, and On the Wings of Inferno would be their final studio album until they reunited in 2007 and released the seventh album, Death...The Brutal Way, in 2009.

This album was re-released on 13 November 2009 as a remastered version.

== Track listing ==
No.	Title	Length
1.	"Summoning the Storm"	5:18
2.	"The Scent of Obscurity"	2:56
3.	"For They Ascend..."	2:50
4.	"On the Wings of Inferno"	4:26
5.	"06/06/2006"	2:26
6.	"Waves of Fire"	2:05
7.	"Indulge in Frenzy"	2:56
8.	"Chaos in the Flesh"	3:12
9.	"Marching towards the Styx"	3:02
Total length:		29:11

== Personnel ==
Asphyx

- Eric Daniels - guitar
- Bob Bagchus - drums
- Wannes Gubbels - vocals, bass guitar

Production

- Axel Hermann - artwork, design
- Erik de Boer - engineer, producer
- Harry Wijering - engineer, producer
- Ulf Horbelt - re-master
