= Houwitser =

Dutch death metal band

Houwitser ("Howitzer") is a Dutch death metal band. The band released several albums, among others, two on Osmose Productions and two on Displeased Records.

The band split in 2004, the members proceeding with other projects. The band later reformed and put out a two-track promo in 2009. In 2010, one of the tracks were re-recorded with Kam Lee on guest vocals, which would be included on the full-length Bestial Atrocity in 2010.

== Discography ==
- Death... but Not Buried (1999)
- Embrace Damnation (2000)
- Rage Inside the Womb (2002)
- Damage Assessment (2003)
- Sledgehammer Redemption (single, 2009)
- Bestial Atrocity (2010)
- Sentinel Beast (2024)

The band also contributed to Seven Gates of Horror, a tribute album to Possessed.
