= Summer Breeze Festival UK =

Music festival in Liddington, UK

Summer Breeze Festival
- Genre: Folk, indie, pop, rock, ska, roots
- Dates: July
- Locations: Liddington, near Swindon, England
- Years active: 2007–present
- Website: summerbreezegardenparty.co.uk

The Summer Breeze Festival, later rebranded as the Summer Breeze Garden Party, is an annual independent, non-profit music festival held at Warren Farm in Liddington, near Swindon, in the United Kingdom. It was first held in 2007, with an audience of around 150 people; by 2012, attendance had grown to around 2,000. The festival supports up-and-coming bands and local music alongside established acts. It is run on a voluntary basis, with profits either donated to charity or reinvested in the event. Past lineups have included KT Tunstall, Vintage Trouble, and Toploader.
