= Ed Warby =

Dutch metal drummer

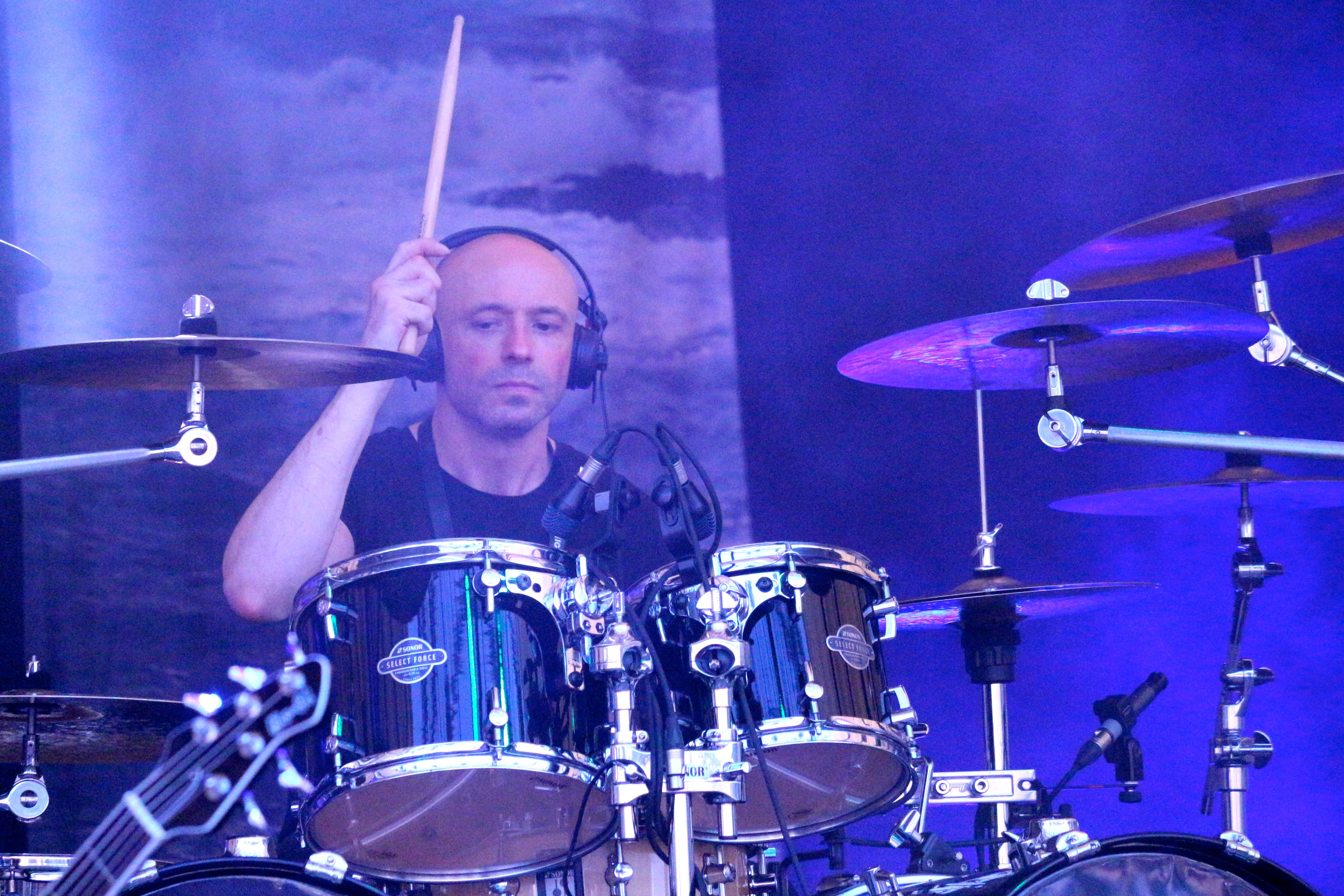
- Warby performing in 2015

Background information
- Born: Edward Robert Warbie; 7 March 1968 (age 58)
- Origin: Rotterdam, Netherlands
- Genres: Death metal, progressive metal, symphonic metal, doom metal, heavy metal, power metal, death 'n' roll
- Occupation: Drummer
- Member of: Ayreon, Star One, VUUR
- Formerly of: Gorefest, Elegy, Hail of Bullets
- Website: edwarby.com

Edward R. Warby (born 7 March 1968) is a Dutch musician, best known as the drummer for death metal band Gorefest and progressive rock/metal project Ayreon.

He also appeared in the band Agressor in 1982 and joined the Eindhoven-based metal band Elegy in 1987. Warby moved to Gorefest in 1992, where he replaced the former drummer just before the recording sessions of "False", he had to learn all themes and develop his work in just two weeks, which he managed to achieve in a matter so fast that producer Colin Richardson nicknamed him Fast Eddy. After Gorefest split up in 1999, he took part in the re-united Gorefest in 2004.

In 1998, Arjen Anthony Lucassen asked Warby to perform on his album Into the Electric Castle, because Arjen was impressed with Warby's works with Gorefest. From that moment on, Warby had performed on Ayreon's every album, except for Universal Migrator Part 1: The Dream Sequencer and Transitus. He also performed on the re-recording of Actual Fantasy (the original recording featured a computerized set of drums). He's also a member, since its creation in 2002, of Lucassen's band Star One and has also performed in his latest solo album Lost in the New Real.

He helped the Dutch pop band Krezip during the recordings of "Days Like This" in 2002. He also helped German band Love Like Blood with three songs of their album "Snakekiller", in 1998. In 2005 he played live with the Dutch gothic metal band After Forever while their actual drummer André Borgman was recovering from cancer.

In 2008, Warby began a doom metal project named The 11th Hour, and released the album The Burden of Grief in 2009. All guitars, bass, drums, keyboards and clean vocals are performed by Warby, with the additional growls contributed by Rogga Johansson (Ribspreader). The Burden of Grief is a concept album, "about a man about to die from a lung disease."

== Discography ==
=== With The 11th Hour ===
- The Burden of Grief (2009)
- Lacrima Mortis (2012)

=== With Arjen Anthony Lucassen ===
- Lost in the New Real (2012)

=== With Vuur ===
- In This Moment We Are Free – Cities (2017)

=== With Hail of Bullets ===
- …Of Frost and War (2008)
- On Divine Winds (2010)
- III: The Rommel Chronicles (2013)

=== With Elegy ===
- Labyrinth of Dreams (1992)

=== With Gorefest ===
- False (Nuclear Blast 1992)
- The Eindhoven Insanity (Nuclear Blast 1993)
- Erase (Nuclear Blast 1994)
- Fear EP (1994)
- Soul Survivor (Nuclear Blast 1996)
- Freedom EP (1996)
- Chapter 13 (SPV 1998)
- La Muerte (2005)
- Rise to Ruin (2007)

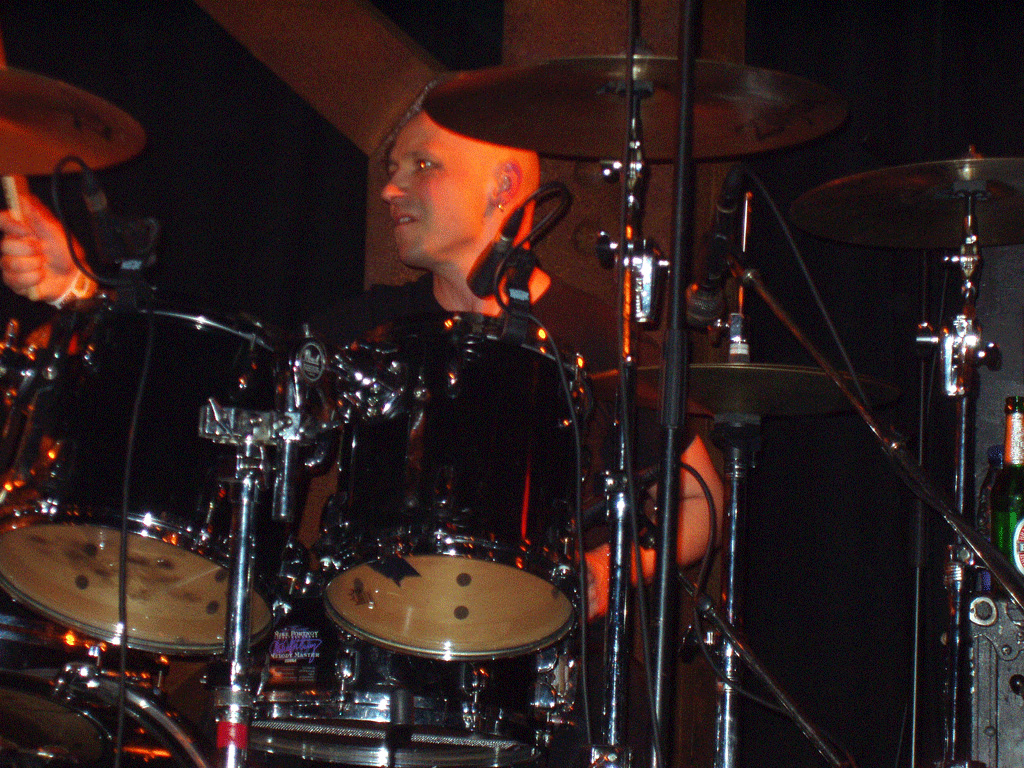
Warby playing at "The Waterfront", Rotterdam

=== With Ayreon ===
- Into the Electric Castle (1998)
- Universal Migrator Part 2: Flight of the Migrator (2000)
- The Human Equation (InsideOut 2004)
- Actual Fantasy (Revisited) (InsideOut 2005)
- 01011001 (2008)
- The Theory of Everything (2013)
- The Theater Equation (live, 2016)
- The Source (2017)
- Ayreon Universe – The Best of Ayreon Live (live, 2018)
- Electric Castle Live and Other Tales (live, 2020)
- 01011001 – Live Beneath the Waves (live, 2024)

=== With The Gentle Storm ===
- The Diary (2015)

=== With Lana Lane ===
- Secrets of Astrology (2000)

=== With Star One ===
- Space Metal (InsideOut 2002)
- Live on Earth (InsideOut 2003)
- Victims of the Modern Age (InsideOut 2010)
- Revel in Time (InsideOut 2022)

=== Guest appearances ===
==== With Love Like Blood ====
- Snakekiller (on 3 songs) (1998)

==== With Krezip ====
- Days Like This (2002)
