= Thanatos (band) =

Dutch extreme metal band

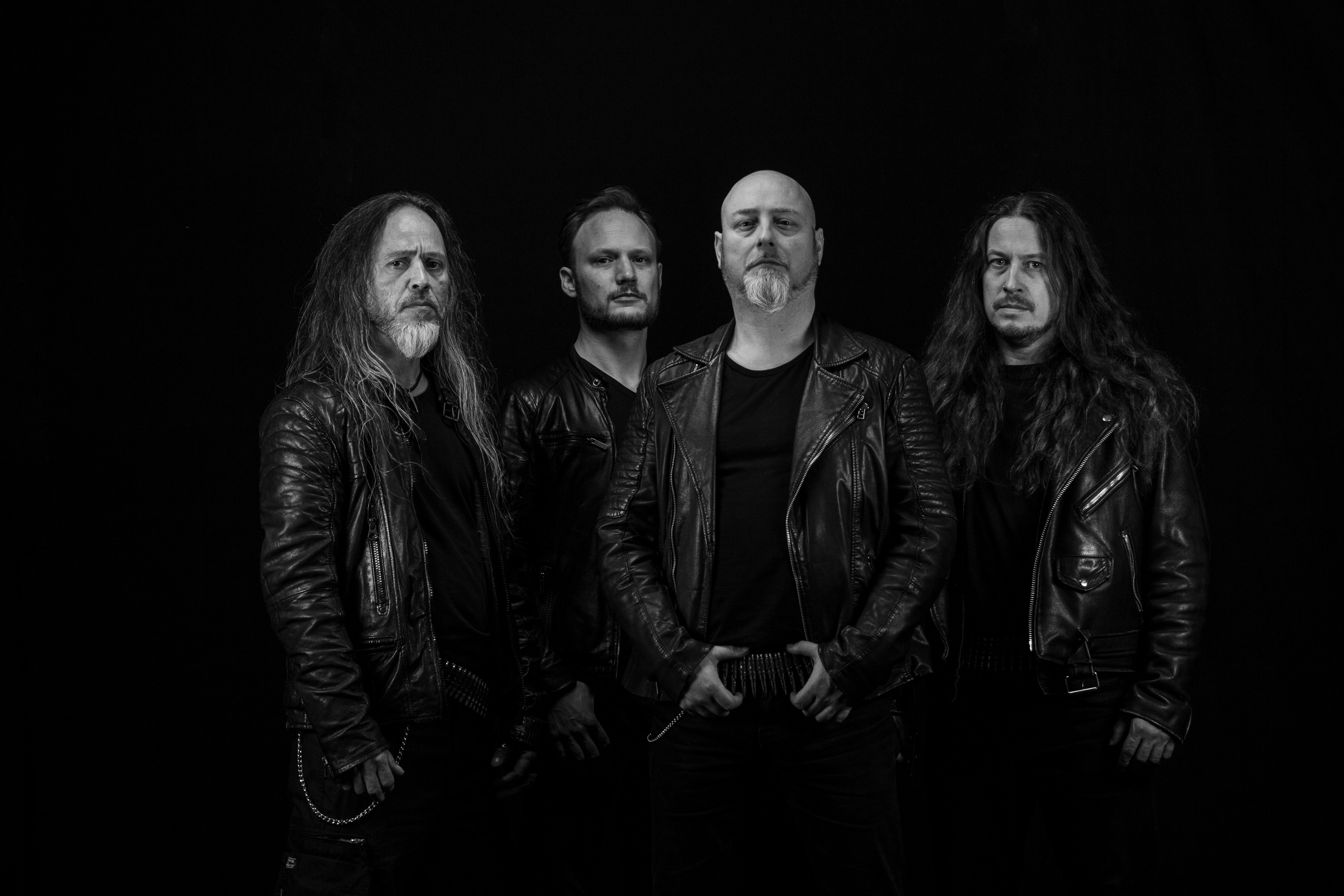
- Official band photo from 2014

Background information
- Origin: Rotterdam, Netherlands
- Genres: Thrash metal, death metal
- Years active: 1984–1992, 1999–2022
- Label: Listenable Records
- Past members: Stephan Gebédi; Paul Baayens; Martin Ooms; Mous Mirer; Aad Kloosterwaard; André Scherpenberg; Ed Boeser; Erwin De Brouwer; Marcel Van Arnhem; Marco de Groot; Mark Staffhorst; Remco De Maaijer; Remo Van Arnhem; Rob De Bruijn; Theo Van Eekelen
- Website: thanatos.info

Thanatos was a Dutch death/thrash metal band formed Rotterdam in 1984. They have released seven studio albums.

== History ==
Dating back to 1984, Thanatos is the oldest death metal band from the Netherlands. Their second album, Realm of Ecstasy, received positive reviews from Dutch music magazine Oor and various international magazines for its compositions and arrangements. After line-up changes and problems with distribution, promotion, and ownership of the rights to the second album, Thanatos folded in 1992, following the cancellation of a tour with Cannibal Corpse and Exhorder.

In 1999, founding member Stephan Gebédi revived the band and signed with Hammerheart Records. After re-releasing the first two albums with demo and live tracks, the band's third album, Angelic Encounters, was released in 2000. In 2002, a mini-CD with original songs and covers from Celtic Frost and Possessed was released by Baphomet. After a few shows in Greece and a short tour with Pungent Stench, the band recorded their fourth album, Undead. Unholy. Divine, described as a return to 1980s metal in the style of Slayer and Possessed, with the addition of blast beats. A fifth album, Justified Genocide, was postponed when the band's label, Black Lotus Records, went bankrupt. Dan Swano finished the mix for the CD. To celebrate more than twenty years of activity, Thanatos released a limited-edition box containing Emerging from the Netherworlds, Realm of Ecstasy, and Angelic Encounters, besides 56 bonus tracks and 19 videos, on Chinese label AreaDeath Productions.

In February 2009, the band revealed details of their upcoming album, Justified Genocide, released on 15 March in Europe and 6 April in the UK and Ireland.

Century Media Records signed the band in 2012. They planned to re-release the band's five studio albums in 2012 and 2013, but the label offered the band a new recording contract that resulted in a new studio album in 2014, Global Purification. This coincided with the band's 30th anniversary. In 2019, Thanatos celebrated their 35th anniversary with a double-CD compilation album, a 7-inch vinyl EP, and a special show in Rotterdam, featuring former band members. Later that year, they signed with French label Listenable Records and recorded their seventh studio album, Violent Death Rituals, released in March 2020.

== Members ==
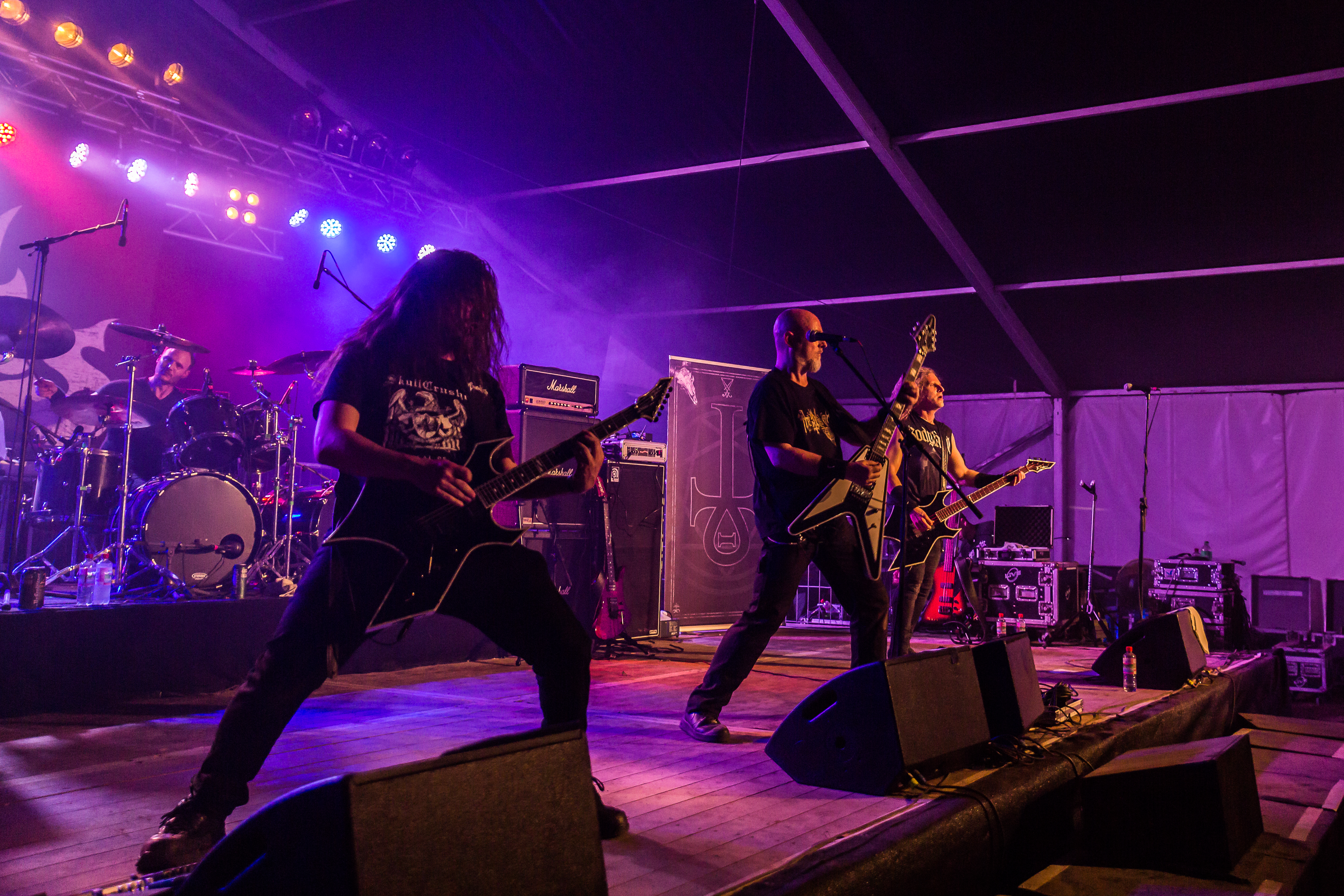
Thanatos performing in 2019

=== Final Lineup ===
- Stephan Gebédi – vocals, guitar (1984–1992, 1999–2022)
- Paul Baayens – guitar (1999–2022)
- Mous Mirer – bass (2019–2022)
- Martin Ooms – drums (2017–2022)

=== Former Members ===
- Marcel van Arnhem – drums (1984–1985)
- Remco de Maaijer – guitar (1984–1985)
- André Scherpenberg – bass (1986–1987)
- Rob de Bruin – drums (1986)
- Remo van Arnhem – drums (1986–1992)
- Erwin de Brouwer – bass (1987), guitar (1988–1992)
- Mark Staffhorst – guitar (1987)
- Ed Boeser – bass (1988–1992)
- Theo van Eekelen – bass (1999–2001)
- Aad Kloosterwaard – drums (1999–2001)
- Marco de Groot – drums (2009–2012)
- Yuri Rinkel – drums (2001–2009, 2012–2017)
- Marco de Bruin – bass (2001–2019)

== Discography ==
=== Demos ===
- Speed Kills (1984)
- Rebirth (1986)
- The Day Before Tomorrow (1987)
- Official Live Tape 1987 (1987)
- Omnicoitor (1989)

=== Studio albums ===
- Emerging from the Netherworlds (1990)
- Realm of Ecstasy (1992)
- Angelic Encounters (2000)
- Undead. Unholy. Divine. (2004)
- Justified Genocide (2009)
- Global Purification (2014)
- Violent Death Rituals (2020)

=== Live album ===
- Official Live Tape 1987 (2011 CD reissue)

=== Compilation albums ===
- Thanatology: Terror from the Vault (2019)
- Four Decades of Death (2024)

=== EPs ===
- Beyond Terror (2002)
- The Burning of Sodom/...And Jesus Wept (2006)
- Thanatos/Asphyx 7-inch split EP; Thanatos: Re-animation (Sacrifice cover) / Asphyx: Bestial Vomit (Majesty cover) (2011)
- Blind Obedience/Thanatos (2019)
