= Gorefest =

Dutch death metal band

- Origin: Goes, Netherlands
- Genres: Death metal, death 'n' roll
- Years active: 1989–1998, 2004–2009
- Labels: Nuclear Blast
- Past members: Jan-Chris de Koeijer; Boudewijn Bonebakker; Frank Harthoorn; Ed Warby; Alex van Schaik; Marc Hoogendoorn; Rene Merkelbach

Gorefest was a Dutch death metal band from Goes, Zeeland. It was founded in 1989 by Jan-Chris de Koeijer, Frank Harthoorn, Alex van Schaik and Marc Hoogendoorn.

== Career ==
=== Early works (1989-1994) ===
Within two months of its formation, Gorefest recorded their first demo. A Dutch independent label, Foundation 2000, signed them for one album. Before recording Mindloss, they released another demo in 1990, which received positive feedback. As a supporting act for Carcass they traveled through Belgium and the Netherlands impressing the metal-scene also on stage. Colin Richardson was the producer of 1991's album Mindloss.

Before they toured with Revenant from New Jersey, guitarist Alex van Schaik was replaced by Boudewijn Vincent Bonebakker. Not satisfied with Foundation 2000, Gorefest signed a contract in 1992 with Nuclear Blast. Hoogendoorn quit because of incidents during the Mindloss-tour and drummer Ed Warby (who came from the power metal band Elegy) took his place two weeks before recording sessions of False which was also produced by Colin Richardson. The album sold relatively well in the Netherlands and Germany for a band of the genre. In the months to come, they completed a European tour with Deicide and Atrocity, playing in Germany, Sweden, Spain, Czech Republic, Slovakia and England. In 1993, Gorefest played a show at the Dynamo Open Air at Eindhoven. The Eindhoven Insanity was released soon thereafter, featuring this performance. Also in 1993, they toured North America as a supporting act for metal band Death. Their Insanity Tour closed with a show in Mexico City, Mexico.

Erase was recorded in 1994, with producer Pete Coleman and revealed a different attitude towards traditional death metal. As a result, public opinion towards Gorefest was divided. Erase, however, proved to be a success as international sales went well through 1994 and 1995. The band reached a broader set of countries in the following tours.

=== Change in style and subsequent split (1994-1998) ===
In the Fear EP and "Freedom" single, Gorefest revealed new tracks showing that they wanted to drastically expand upon the musical changes they had applied in Erase (De Koeijer declared in some interviews that he even had thoughts about taking singing lessons). This would be confirmed in 1996 with the rock-influenced album Soul Survivor – a total departure from their roots even showing traces of pop – and a very similar album Chapter 13 in 1998.

They abandoned their heavy image and the graphics for these works were less extreme. Many fans turned their backs on them and the sales of the album were relatively poor, thus they split up in 1998.

=== Return and final disbandment (2004-2009) ===
Gorefest reformed in 2004 and played various summer festivals in 2005. The band came out with a new album, La Muerte. They produced the album themselves, with mixing handled by Tue Madsen at Antfarm Studios.

In 2006, De Koeyer appeared at Epica's concert in Paradiso (Amsterdam) as a guest grunter on the song "Consign to Oblivion" (A New Age Dawns #3).

The next album, Rise to Ruin, was released in August 2007. The American release was licensed to Candlelight Records.

On 15 June 2009, the band announced that they were calling it quits again, stating that they felt they had gone as far with the band as they could.

== Members ==
Final lineup

- Jan Chris de Koeijer – vocals, bass (1989–1998, 2004–2009)
- Frank Harthoorn – guitar (1989–1998, 2004–2009)
- Boudewijn Bonebakker – guitar (1991–1998, 2004–2009)
- Ed Warby – drums (1991–1998, 2004–2009)

Previous members

- Marc Hoogendoorn – drums (1989–1991)
- Alex van Schaik – guitar (1989–1991)
- René Merkelbach – keyboards (1996–1998)

== Discography ==
=== Studio albums ===
- Mindloss (1991)
- False (1992)
- Erase (1994)
- Soul Survivor (1996)
- Chapter 13 (1998)
- La Muerte (2005)
- Rise to Ruin (2007)

=== EPs and singles ===
- Live Misery (1992)
- Fear (1994)
- Freedom (1996)

=== Compilations ===
- To Hell and Back – A Goreography (2005)
- False/Erase (2005)

=== Live albums ===
- The Eindhoven Insanity (1993)
