= Asphyx =

Dutch death metal band

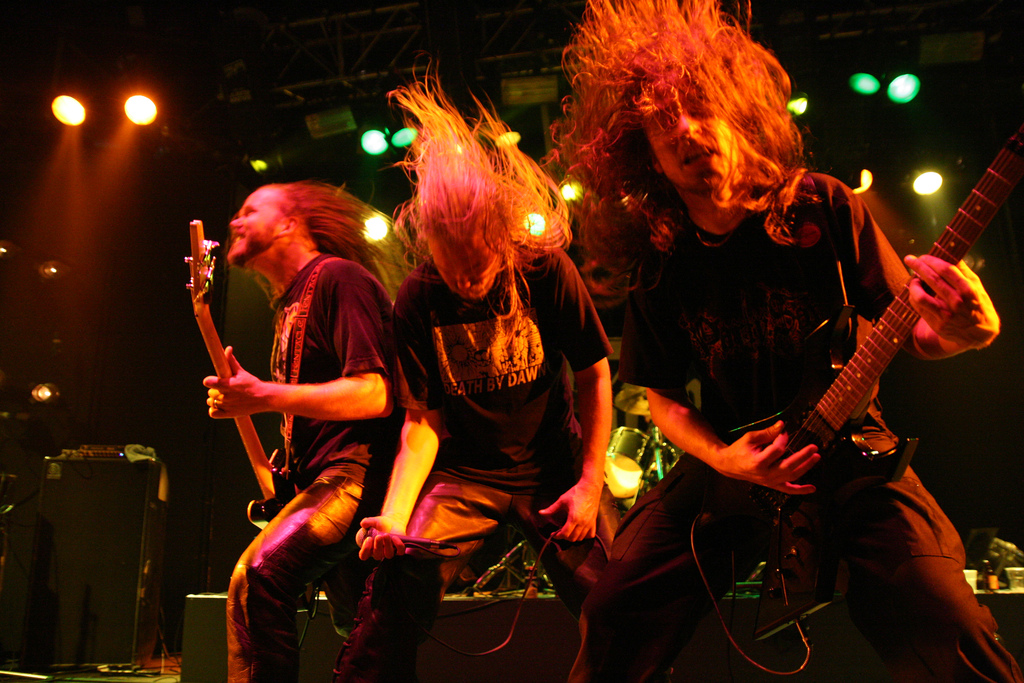
- Asphyx performing in London, 2007

Background information
- Origin: Oldenzaal, Overijssel, Netherlands
- Genres: Death metal; death-doom
- Years active: 1987–1994; 1995–1996; 1997–2000; 2007–present
- Label: Century Media
- Spinoffs: Soulburn; Hail of Bullets; Grand Supreme Blood Court
- Members: Martin van Drunen; Paul Baayens; Alwin Zuur; Stefan Hüskens
- Past members: Bob Bagchus; Tony Brookhuis; Eric Daniels; Joost; Chuck Colli; Theo Loomans; Ron van Pol; Sander van Hoof; Heiko Hanke; Ronny van der Wey; Wannes Gubbels
- Website: asphyx.nl

Asphyx is a Dutch death/doom metal band formed in Oldenzaal, Overijssel in 1987 by Bob Bagchus and Tony Brookhuis. Since 2014, no original members remain in the band. Vocalist Martin van Drunen is the only current member to have appeared on their debut album.

== History ==
Bob Bagchus and Tony Brookhuis formed the band in 1987. Joost was recruited for vocals and bass, but was replaced with Chuck Colli after the release of the first demo, Carnage Remains. This line-up released the Enter the Domain demo, after which Eric Daniels joined as a second guitarist. In March 1989, Theo Loomans replaced Colli and the band recorded the Crush the Cenotaph demo. Brookhuis left the band and the remaining three recorded Embrace the Death, an album that went unreleased because of label problems.

After leaving Pestilence in the early 1990s, Martin van Drunen joined Asphyx, and the band signed to Century Media Records. After the release of their first album, The Rack, they toured Europe with Entombed, followed by a tour with Bolt Thrower and Benediction in 1992. Shortly after recording the second album, Last One on Earth, van Drunen left the band, to be replaced with Ron van der Pol. Bagchus left the band too and Sander van Hoof replaced him.

In 1994, the band released its third, self-titled album, disbanding shortly after. In 1995, Loomans and Bagchus reformed Asphyx and recorded God Cries. Around the same time, the album Embrace the Death (recorded in 1990) was released, and the band broke up again. In 1998, Loomans died after a train struck his car (with circumstances suggesting an act of suicide). Later, Bagchus and Daniels founded Soulburn in collaboration with Pentacle singer and bassist Wannes Gubbels. The group recorded and released Feeding on Angels. In 1999, they renamed the project Asphyx and recorded the On the Wings of Inferno album with the same line up. Asphyx disbanded again in 2000.

In January 2007, the band reunited with van Drunen, Gubbels, Paul Baayens and Bagchus. They did not intend to record a new album, but focused on live performances. In January 2008, they recorded a cover of a Celtic Frost song and a new song called "Death...The Brutal Way". In July 2008, they announced that they were preparing new material. Death...The Brutal Way was released in June 2009 by Century Media. It was released in North America by Ibex Moon Records on 18 August 2009, becoming the distributor's best seller.

On 30 November 2011, Asphyx finished recording their eighth studio album, Deathhammer, set to be released on 27 February 2012 in Europe and 28 February 2012 in North America via Century Media Records.

In March 2014, founding member Bob Bagchus departed the band, leaving the group with no original members. Drummer Stefan Hüskens replaced him.

On 14 October 2015, Asphyx announced that they were working on a new album at the end of November to follow up Deathhammer, and would begin their first tour at Latin America.

== Band members ==
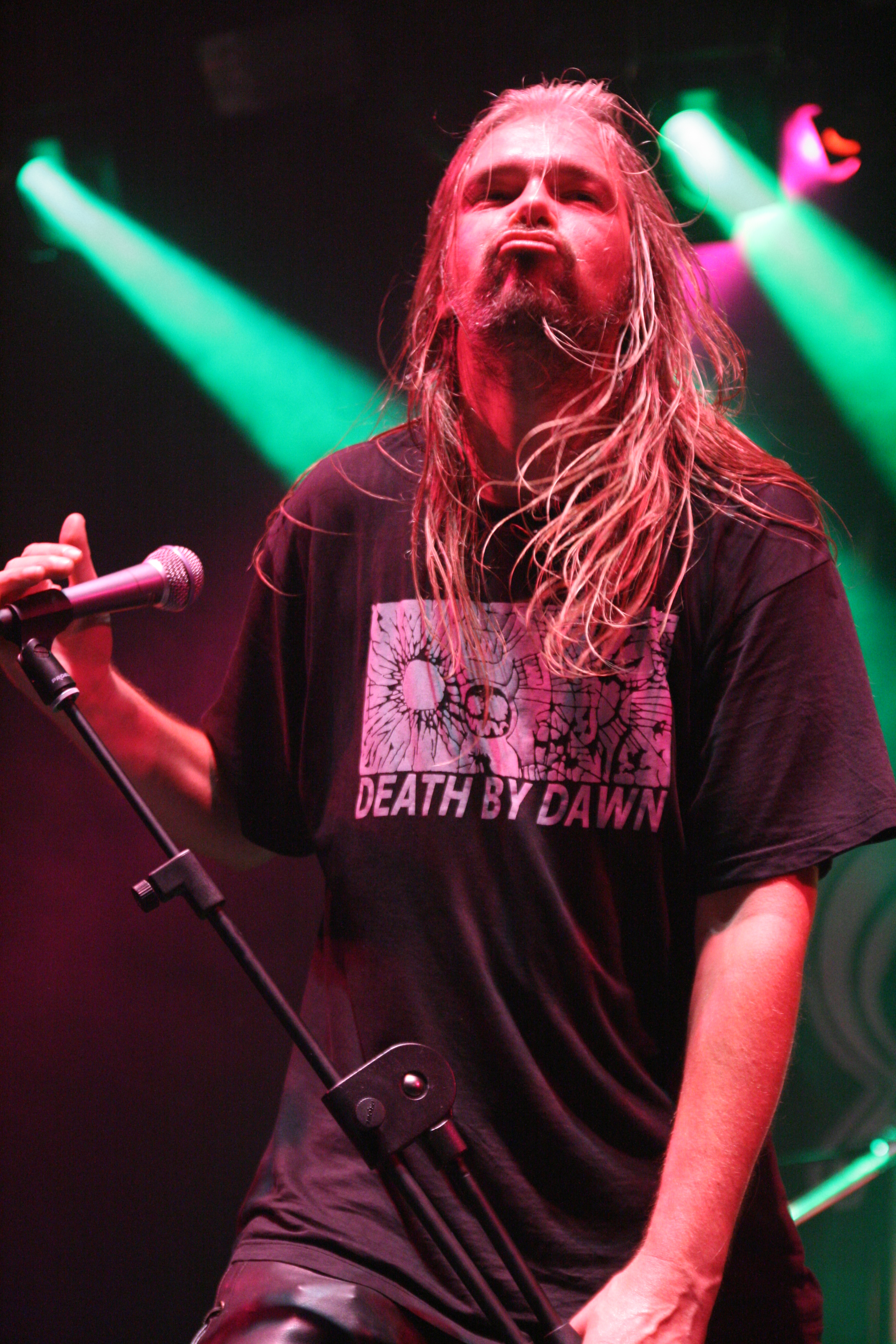
Martin van Drunen in concert, 2007

=== Current members ===
- Martin van Drunen – vocals (1990–1992, 2007–present), bass (1990–1992)
- Paul Baayens – guitar (2007–present)
- Alwin Zuur – bass (2010–present)
- Stefan Hüskens – drums (2014–present)

=== Former members ===
- Tony Brookhuis – guitar (1987–1989)
- Bob Bagchus – drums (1987–1993, 1995–1996, 1997–2000, 2007–2014)
- Eric Daniels – guitar (1989–1995, 1996, 1997–2000)
- Joost – vocals, bass (1987–1988)
- Chuck Colli – vocals, bass (1988–1989)
- Theo Loomans – vocals, bass, guitar (1989–1990, 1995–1996; died 1998)
- Ron van Pol – vocals, bass (1992–1994)
- Sander van Hoof – drums (1993–1994)
- Heiko Hanke – keyboards (1994)
- Ronny van der Wey – guitar (1988–1989, 1995)
- Wannes Gubbels – vocals (1997–2000); bass (1997–2000, 2007–2010)

== Discography ==
=== Studio albums ===
- The Rack (1991)
- Last One on Earth (1992)
- Asphyx (1994)
- God Cries (1996)
- Embrace the Death (1996; recorded in 1990)
- On the Wings of Inferno (2000)
- Death...The Brutal Way (2009)
- Deathhammer (2012)
- Incoming Death (2016)
- Necroceros (2021)

=== Live albums ===
- Live Death Doom (2010 double live album and DVD)

=== Extended plays (EPs) ===
- Crush the Cenotaph (1992)
- Servants of Death (2016)

=== Singles ===
- Mutilating Process (1989)
- Death the Brutal Way (2008)
- Reign of the Brute (2012)
- Deathibel (2016)

=== Demos ===
- Carnage Remains (1988)
- Enter the Domain (1989)
- Crush the Cenotaph (1989)
- Promo '91 (1991)
- Promo '95 (1995)
