= Jan-Chris de Koeijer =

- Also known as: Jan Chris de Koeyer
- Born: 20 October 1966 (age 59); Yerseke, Netherlands
- Genres: Death metal
- Occupation: Musician
- Instruments: Vocals, bass
- Years active: 1989-present

Jan-Chris de Koeijer or Jan Chris de Koeyer (born 20 October 1966, Yerseke) is a Dutch bass player and singer. He is best known for his position in Gorefest. He also co-founded the band.

He provided vocals for Ayreon's 1995 debut album, The Final Experiment.

After the disbandment, De Koeyer focused on a studio project called ColdPopCulture, together with Iljan Mol.

In 2004, he took part in the re-united Gorefest.

In 2006, he appeared at EPICA's concert in Paradiso (Amsterdam) as a guest grunter on the song Consign to Oblivion (A New Age Dawns #3).
