= 2025 in Nordic music =

The following is a list of notable events and releases that happened in Nordic music in 2025.

== Events ==
- 4 January – The Finlandia Hall in Helsinki officially reopens, following the completion of a renovation project that began in 2022.
- 6 January – Finnish DJ Yotto broadcasts his first hour-long show, "Yotto's Odd World", on Europe's One World Radio, specialising in electronic dance music.
- 16 January – Norway's Kristine Tjøgersen is one of the recipients of the Ernst von Siemens Composer Prizes for 2025.
- 29 January – 1 February – The Bodø Jazz Open takes place in Norway, featuring Susanne Lundeng, Arve Henriksen, Cornelis Vreeswijk, Rebekka Bakken and others.
- 2 February – At the 67th Annual Grammy Awards, Norwegian sound engineer Morten Lindberg is among nominees for the Grammy award for Best Immersive Audio Album for his work on Henning Sommerro's Borders and Pax by Nina T. Karlsen, Ensemble 96 & Current Saxophone Quartet, and for Producer of the Year, Classical, for Borders, Pax and Mor (Karen Haugom Olsen & Nidaros Domkor).
- 21 February – Norwegian metal band Sarke announce that they have broken up.
- 8 March – In the final of Sweden's 65th Melodifestivalen, with a new voting format, KAJ is the act selected to represent the country at the Eurovision Song Contest, with the song "Bara bada bastu".
- 10 March – The Norwegian Radio Orchestra announces the appointment of Holly Hyun Choe as its next principal conductor, with effect from January 2026; she will be the first female conductor to hold the post.
- 17 March – Guitarist Anders Nyström leaves the Swedish band Katatonia, which he co-founded in 1991.
- May – Heavy metal band My Dying Bride are due to return to live performance, with Finland's Mikko Kotamäki replacing Aaron Stainthorpe.
- 17 May – In the final of the 69th Eurovision Song Contest, Sweden take fourth place with "Bara bada bastu", performed by KAJ, which tops the singles charts in Finland, Norway and Sweden. Finland finish in 11th place, Norway 18th and Iceland 25th. Denmark are eliminated at the semi-final stage.
- September – The Finnish Music Publishers Association (MPA Finland) holds its annual awards ceremony. Winners include Lara Poe and Joel Järventausta, Saimaa. Darude, Outi Tarkiainen and KAJ.
- 7 October – The Swedish Radio Symphony Orchestra appoints Andrés Orozco-Estrada as its next chief conductor, beginning with the 2026–2027 season.
- 7 November – Nominees for the 68th Annual Grammy Awards are announced; they include Swedish metal band Ghost in the Best Metal Performance category and Norway's Morten Lindberg in the Producer of the Year (Classical) and Best Immersive Audio Album category. Swedish composer Ludwig Göransson is nominated in the Best Instrumental Composition for "Why You Here / Before the Sun Went Down".
- 26 November – Finnish clarinetist Kari Kriikku announces that he is retiring from musical performance.

== Classical works ==
- Anders Hillborg – Hell Mountain (Homage to Mahler)
- Bent Sørensen and Jon Fosse – Asle og Alida (opera)
- Anna S. Þorvaldsdóttir – Cello concerto, Before we fall

== Top hit singles ==
- Björk, Rosalía, and Yves Tumor – "Berghain" (#1 Spain; #4 Portugal)
- Isac Elliot – "Ai että" (#1 Finland)
- Klara Hammarström – "On and On and On" (#1 Sweden)
- Benjamin Hav featuring Lukas Graham – "Du ligner din mor" (#1 Denmark)
- Omar featuring Mumle – "Hele vejen"
- Peg Parnevik – "Spelar ingen roll" (#1 Sweden)
- Molly Sandén – "Blåögd" (#8 Sweden)
- Rasmus Seebach & Artigeardit – "Sandheden" (#1 Denmark)
- Tjuvjakt & Fanny Avonne – "Tusen spänn" (#1 Sweden)
- Turisti – "Diana" (#1 FInland)
- Anton Westerlin featuring Annika – "Blodigt" (#1 Denmark)

== Albums released ==
=== January ===
| Day | Artist | Album | Label | Notes | Ref. |
|---|---|---|---|---|---|
| 10 | The Halo Effect | March of the Unheard | Nuclear Blast | | |
| 24 | Avatarium | Between You, God, the Devil and the Dead | AFM Records | | |
| 24 | Sven-Åke Johansson | Stumps | Trost Records | Second version of 2022 album | |
| 25 | Wardruna | Birna | | "She-Bear" theme | |

=== February ===
| Day | Artist | Album | Label | Notes | Ref. |
|---|---|---|---|---|---|
| 7 | Marko Hietala | Roses from the Deep | Nuclear Blast | | |
| 7 | Majestica | Power Train | Nuclear Blast | First album for four years | |
| 14 | Dawn of Solace | Affliction Vortex | | | |
| 14 | Dynazty | Game of Faces | Nuclear Blast | | |
| 28 | Arion | The Light That Burns the Sky | Ranka Kustannus, Avalon Label / Marquee Inc., RPM | | |

=== March ===
| Day | Artist | Album | Label | Notes | Ref. |
|---|---|---|---|---|---|
| 7 | Balance Breach | Save Our Souls | Out of Line Music | | |
| 7 | Carnal Forge | The Fractured Process | ViciSolum Productions | EP; last release before the death of bassist Lars Lindén | |
| 21 | Lordi | Limited Deadition | Reigning Phoenix Music | | |
| 28 | Svartsyn | Vortex of the Destroyer | Reigning Phoenix Music | | |

=== April ===
| Day | Artist | Album | Label | Notes | Ref. |
|---|---|---|---|---|---|
| 25 | Liv Kristine | Amor Vincit Omnia | Metalville Records | | |
| 25 | Yngwie Malmsteen | Tokyo Live | Music Theories Recordings | Live album | |

=== May ===
| Day | Artist | Album | Label | Notes | Ref. |
|---|---|---|---|---|---|
| 9 | Candlemass | Black Star | Napalm Records | EP | |
| 16 | KAJ | The Sauna Collection | Warner Music Sweden | Compilation album | |
| 16 | Tarja Turunen | Circus Life | earMUSIC | Live album | |
| 23 | ...And Oceans | The Regeneration Itinerary | Season of Mist | | |
| 30 | Ellen Arkbro | Nightclouds | Blank Forms Editions | Collaboration with Microtub | |

=== June ===
| Day | Artist | Album | Label | Notes | Ref. |
|---|---|---|---|---|---|
| 6 | Nicholas Collon (conductor); Finnish Radio Symphony Orchestra | Sibelius Symphony No 5. Two Serenades | Ondine | Violin soloist: Christian Tetzlaff | |
| 6 | Gaahls Wyrd | Braiding the Stories | Season of Mist | | |
| 6 | Katatonia | Nightmares as Extensions of the Waking State | Napalm Records | First album without Anders Nyström | |
| 6 | John Lundvik | Dance Cry Laugh Smile | Warner Music Sweden | EP | |
| 6 | Volbeat | God of Angels Trust | Vertigo Records, Republic Records, Universal Records | First studio album without Rob Caggiano | |
| 20 | Helheim | HrabnaR / Ad Vesa[s | Dark Essence Records | | |

=== July ===
| Day | Artist | Album | Label | Notes | Ref. |
|---|---|---|---|---|---|
| 13 | Molly Sandén | Strawberry Blonde | Milkshake, Sony Music | | |

=== August ===
| Day | Artist | Album | Label | Notes | Ref. |
|---|---|---|---|---|---|
| 13 | Baest | Colossal | | | |
| 13 | Unleashed | Fire Upon Your Lands | Napalm Records | All tracks written by Johnny Hedlund and Fredrik Folkare. | |

=== September ===
| Day | Artist | Album | Label | Notes | Ref. |
|---|---|---|---|---|---|
| 5 | Before the Dawn | Cold Flare Eternal | Reaper Entertainment | | |
| 5 | Eleine | We Stand United | Reigning Phoenix Music | EP | |
| 26 | Amorphis | Borderland | Reigning Phoenix Music | | |
| 26 | Zara Larsson | Midnight Sun | Sommer House, Epic Records | Featuring MNEK and Kabba | |
| 26 | Vintersorg | Vattenkrafternas Spel | Hammerheart Records | | |
| 30 | Ribspreader | As Gods Devour | Xtreem Music | | |

=== October ===
| Day | Artist | Album | Label | Notes | Ref. |
|---|---|---|---|---|---|
| 3 | Bloodred Hourglass | We Should Be Buried Like This | Out of Line Music | | |
| 3 | Hooded Menace | Lachrymose Monuments of Obscuration | Season of Mist | | |
| 3 | Ofermod | Drakosophia | Shadow Records | | |
| 10 | Nils Patrik Johansson | War and Peace | Metalville Records | Solo album | |

=== November ===
| Day | Artist | Album | Label | Notes | Ref. |
|---|---|---|---|---|---|
| 7 | Centinex | With Guts and Glory | Black Lion Records | | |
| 7 | Nektar | Om du behöver mig | | | |
| 7 | Omnium Gatherum | May the Bridges We Burn Light the Way | Sony Music Entertainment Sweden | | |
| 21 | Bloodbound | Field of Swords | Napalm Records | First release on Napalm | |

=== December ===
| Day | Artist | Album | Label | Notes | Ref. |
|---|---|---|---|---|---|
| 5 | Blood Red Throne | Siltskin | Soulseller Records | | |
| 12 | Rotten Sound | Mass Extinction | Season Of Mist | EP | |

== Deaths ==
- 4 January – Árni Grétar Jóhannesson (Futuregrapher), Icelandic electronic musician, 41 (injuries resulting from car accident)
- 5 January – Fredrik Lindgren, Swedish heavy metal musician, 53 (undisclosed causes)
- 7 January – Ragne Wahlquist, Swedish heavy metal musician, 69
- 30 January – Leif "Loket" Olsson, Swedish television and radio host and dansband singer, 82
- 17 February – Nannie Porres, Swedish jazz singer, 85
- 20 February – Ilkka Kuusisto, Finnish composer, choirmaster and opera manager
- 1 March – Sindre Nedland, Norwegian heavy metal vocalist, 40 (cancer)
- 25 March – Tapani Kansa, Finnish singer, 76 (complications from gallbladder surgery)
- 9 April (probable) – Terje Venaas, Norwegian jazz bassist (born 1947)
- 10 April – Niklas Eklund, Swedish classical trumpeter (born 1969)
- 12 April – Steindór Andersen, Icelandic musician (born 1954)
- 22 April – Odd Magne Gridseth, Norwegian jazz bassist, 65
- 30 April – Kari Løvaas, Norwegian opera singer (born 1939)
- 20 May
  - Michael B. Tretow, Swedish record producer associated with ABBA, 80
  - Per Nørgård, Danish composer and music theorist, 92
- 2 June – Birgit Carlstén, Swedish singer and actress, 75
- 7 June – Axel Skalstad, Norwegian jazz drummer, 32
- 15 June – Sven-Åke Johansson, Swedish free jazz drummer and composer, 81/2
- 19 June
  - Anne Marie Børud, Norwegian singer, 76
  - Geirr Lystrup, Norwegian singer and writer, 76
- 2 July – Sven Lindahl, Swedish musician, radio and TV presenter, 88
- 9 August – Bjørn Kjellemyr, Norwegian jazz bassist, 74
- 13 August – Klaus Wirzenius, Finnish bassist, 37
- 20 August – Frank Øren, Norwegian singer, 59
- 16 September – Tomas Lindberg, Swedish death metal singer, 52 (adenoid cystic carcinoma)
- 20 September – Ivar Bøksle, Norwegian singer and accordionist, 78
- 25 October – Björn Andrésen, Swedish actor and musician, 70
- 9 November – Göran Ringbom, Swedish musician, 81
- 10 November – Robert Skrolsvik, Norwegian vocalist (Bjelleklang), 65
- 14 November – Lasse Norres, Finnish music and entertainment producer, 73
- 30 November – Dag Spantell, Norwegian singer, 75
- 12 December – Marilyn Mazur, American-born Danish percussionist, 70
- 26 December – Pate Mustajärvi, Finnish rock singer, 69 (bowel cancer)
