= Midvinterblot (album) =

Studio album by Unleashed
- Released: 2006
- Genre: Death metal
- Length: 46:29
- Label: SPV/Steamhammer

Unleashed chronology
Sworn Allegiance (2004)	Midvinterblot (2006)	Hammer Battalion (2008)

Professional ratings
Review scores
Source	Rating
Allmusic	3.5/5 stars

Midvinterblot is the eighth studio album by the Swedish death metal band Unleashed. It was released in 2006 by Steamhammer Records (a division of SPV Records).

== Track listing ==
No.	Title	Length
1.	"Blood of Lies"	2:39
2.	"This Is Our World Now"	3:21
3.	"We Must Join With Him"	4:00
4.	"Midvinterblot"	2:59
5.	"In Victory or Defeat"	2:40
6.	"Triumph of Genocide"	3:13
7.	"The Avenger"	3:14
8.	"Salvation for Mankind"	2:54
9.	"Psycho Killer"	2:16
10.	"The Witch"	3:18
11.	"I Have Sworn Allegiance"	2:41
12.	"Age of the Warrior"	3:35
13.	"New Dawn Rising"	2:49
14.	"Loyalty and Pride"	3:09
15.	"Valhalla Awaits"	3:35
Total length:		46:29

The song "Age of the Warrior" is made with the titles of all Unleashed albums previous to Midvinterblot: Where No Life Dwells, Across the Open Sea, Shadows in the Deep, Victory, Warrior, Hell's Unleashed, and Sworn Allegiance.
