= Homy Hogs =

Swedish punk band

Homy Hogs were a Swedish punk band formed in Bro, Upplands-Bro Municipality, in 1979, and were active until 1988 with some breaks. They are considered true Swedish pioneers in hardcore punk together with bands like Anti Cimex, Mob 47 and Headcleaners. This foremost considers their first releases, the album Nöje For Nekrofiler from 1981 and the EP Smash Overdose from 1982. Also the demo cassette Ljudfientlighet from 1980. After those, the band played more regular punk rock and other styles. They also made some recordings and an album under the fictitious alter ego band name Werewolves on Wheels, taken from the title of their second album, idea-influenced by various concept albums. Homy Hogs are also known as characters in cartoonist Joakim Lindengren's comics. The album Nöje för nekrofiler (English: ”Fun for necrophiles”) was recorded and produced in 1981 by Mats “Subbe” Söderberg and released on the band's DIY label No Records. LT later started the record label Burn Records and ran it together with Fredrik Lindgren (aka Freddie Eugene). In 1997 LT appeared guesting on backing vocals on the album The Downhill Blues by the punk band Loud Pipes, with members from legendary Swedish death metal bands Unleashed, Entombed, Merciless and others. LT (”Leffe”) and Gördis also appear in the author Stig Larsson's autobiographical novel När det känns att det håller på ta slut. The original drummer Palle Krüger has played with different bands in Norway after his time in the Homy Hogs, made solo albums, and also been a session musician, among others with Staffan Hellstrand.

== Band members ==
=== 1979-1982 ===
- LT Hog (Carl Leif Thunberg) - Guitar/Vocals
- Gördis (Göran Käll) - Bass
- Palle Krüger - Drums
- Drulle Moschta (Olle Ede) - vocals (1981-1982)
- Pettan Enoga (Peter Danielsson) - vocals (1980)
- Kirran (Patrik Christiansson) - Vocals (1979)

=== 1983-1984 ===
- LT Hog - Vocals/Guitar
- Gördis - Drums
- Palle Krüger - Guitar
- Pettan Enoga - Guitar
- Porra Lindengren - Bass

=== 1984-1988 ===
- LT Hog - Vocals/Guitar
- Gördis - Drums
- Porra Lindengren - Guitar
- Nandor Hegedüs - Bass (Also in TST)

== Discography ==
=== Studio albums ===
- Nöje for nekrofiler (1981)
- Werewolves on Wheels (Demo-album) (1986)
- Werewolves on Wheels versus everything that moves (1988)

=== Cassette ===
- Ljudfientlighet (1980)

=== Cassette-EP ===
- Smash Overdose (1982)

=== Demo ===
- High Drive (1984)

=== 7” ===
- Demolition Beat/I wanna destroy (1983)
- Rokker Triplane/High Drive (1988)
- Rokker Triplane (1-sided on cirkular sawblade) (1992)
- Tonight Alright (Split with Union Carbide Productions & G.O.L.D.)(King Kong EP-series 2, 1992)
- Smash Overdose (Split with Fylgja) (2008)

=== 12” ===
- Homy Hogs wanna destroy (1987)
- Demolition Beat/I wanna destroy (1988)

=== Compilations ===
- Youthanasia II (1984)
- Killed by Hardcore vol. 3 (1989)
- Ultimate Swedish Slash & Burn vol. 2 (1996) (As "Down In Flames")
- Hardcore History vol. 7 (N/A)
- Hardcore History vol. 10 (N/A)
- RYM Ultimate Box Set: Swedish Hardcore (2009)
- Bloodstains Across The World #4 (2019)
- Bloodstains Across The World #5 (2019) (As The Incredible Hogs)

== Literature ==
- Peter Jandreus. 2008. The Encyclopedia of Swedish Punk 1977-1987. Stockholm: Premium Publishing.
- Peter Kagerland. 2012. Ny Våg: Svensk Punk/New Wave/Synth 1977-1982. Stockholm: Premium Publishing.
- David Andersson. 2023. Råpunk: The Birth of Swedish Hardcore 1981-89. Edited by Justin Hallström & Caroline Södergren London: No Good Ltd.
