= Stig Larsson =

Stig Larsson may refer to:

- Stig Larsson (author) (Stig Håkan Larsson; born 1955) literary author
- Stieg Larsson (Karl Stig-Erland Larsson; 1954–2004) author of the Millennium trilogy of crime novels and far-left activist
- Stig Larsson (ice hockey) (born 1947) of Djurgårdens IF and Sweden national team
- Stig Olav Larsen (born 1973) Norwegian footballer

== See also ==
- Stieg Larsson
