= The Hunt for White Christ =

Studio album by Unleashed
- Released: October 26, 2018
- Recorded: April – May 2018
- Studio: Chrome Studios (Stockholm, Sweden)
- Genre: Death metal
- Length: 41:39
- Label: Napalm
- Producer: Fredrik Folkare

Unleashed chronology
Dawn of the Nine (2015)	The Hunt for White Christ (2018)	No Sign of Life (2021)

Singles from The Hunt for White Christ
- 1. "Lead Us Into War" Released: September 1, 2018; 2. "The Hunt for White Christ" Released: October 25, 2018

The Hunt for White Christ is the 13th studio album by Swedish death metal band Unleashed, released on October 26, 2018, via Napalm.

The Hunt for White Christ is based on conceptual storyline written by bassist and vocalist Johnny Hedlund about the world of Odalheim and their Midgard warriors, sharing the same story with As Yggdrasil Trembles (2010), Odalheim (2012) and Dawn of the Nine (2015).

== Track listing ==
All lyrics are written by Johnny Hedlund; all music is composed by Fredrik Folkare.

No.	Title	Length
1.	"Lead Us Into War"	3:28
2.	"You Will Fall"	3:35
3.	"Stand Your Ground"	3:15
4.	"Gram"	4:10
5.	"Terror Christ"	3:54
6.	"They Rape the Land"	4:00
7.	"The City of Jorsala Shall Fall"	4:12
8.	"The Hunt for White Christ"	2:36
9.	"Vidaurgelmthul"	3:24
10.	"By the Western Wall"	4:17
11.	"Open to All the World"	4:48
Total length:		41:39

== Personnel ==
Unleashed

- Johnny Hedlund – vocals, bass
- Fredrik Folkare – lead guitar
- Tomas Måsgard – rhythm guitar
- Anders Schultz – drums

Production

- Fredrik Folkare – production, mixing
- Erik Mårtensson – mastering
- Pär Olofsson – cover art
- Joakim Sterner – design
- Jens Rydén – photography

== Charts ==
Chart (2018)	Peak position
Belgian Albums (Ultratop Flanders)	149
Belgian Albums (Ultratop Wallonia)	165
German Albums (Offizielle Top 100)	52
Swiss Albums (Schweizer Hitparade)	87
