= Carl L. Thunberg =

Swedish historian

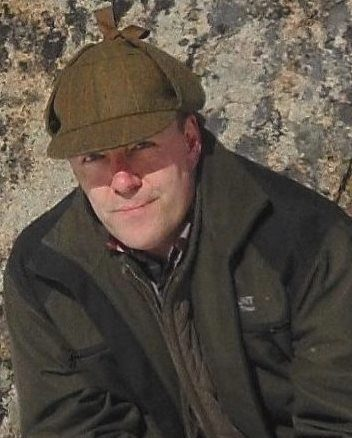
- Carl L. Thunberg in 2013.
- Born: 25 October 1963 (age 62); Lidingö, Sweden
- Occupation: Popular historian

Carl Leif Torbjörn Hugo Erik Johan Erskine Thunberg, FSAScot (born 25 October 1963) is a Swedish popular historian active in cultural heritage protection, and was one of the founders of Blue Shield Sweden from 2023 to 2024, through which process Sweden established its own national committee within Blue Shield International in 2024. As a writer, he has primarily focused on subjects related to the Viking Age and the Middle Ages.

== Biography ==
Thunberg was a punk rock musician during his youth. In 1979 he co-founded the pioneering hardcore punk band Homy Hogs. In this context he became a recurring character in the early comics of Joakim Lindengren. He also appears in Stig Larsson's autobiographical novel När det känns att det håller på ta slut. In the 1990s he ran the indie record label Burn Records with metal guitarist Fredrik Lindgren. He also made a guest appearance on Lindgren's punk band Loud Pipes' debut album The Downhill Blues in 1997.

Thunberg was educated at the University of Gothenburg and Uppsala University. He has lectured on didactic method for history as a school subject. Thunberg became a fellow of the Society of Antiquaries of Scotland in 2016.

Thunberg has in particular worked in various ways in the field of cultural environment work and heritage protection. From 2010 to 2012 he took part in the policy struggle to preserve the archaeological reconstructions at Gene fornby near Örnsköldsvik in Sweden.

=== 2020s ===
In 2021, Thunberg took part in evaluating two controversial findings presented by archaeologist Sven Rosborn: the Curmsun Disc and a transcription of an alleged medieval manuscript. Thunberg's assessment was that extensive further research would be required to make a judgment on authenticity.

In 2022 he was appointed chair of Västernorrlands Museum. In 2023 Thunberg became chair of the Swedish antiquities fund Stiftelsen Björkå AB Fornminnesfond, a foundation for financial contributions to science within archaeological areas, and research grants for scholarly projects involving protected historic buildings, archaeological sites and ancient remains.

In 2023 Thunberg joined the working group for Blue Shield Sweden's inclusion in Blue Shield International. In 2024 the Swedish National Committee was approved as Blue Shield's 34th national committee. Thunberg was then appointed to the newly formalized board of Blue Shield Sweden.

In 2025, Thunberg was elected to the first duly constituted regular board of directors of Blue Shield Sweden, following the initial startup period, and was also appointed authorized signatory and treasurer.

== Selected publications ==
- Gene fornby: The Ancient Village of Gene(2013). In: EXARC Journal Digest 2013. ISSN 2212-523X.
- Slaget på Fyrisvallarna i ny tolkning (2012) [The Battle of Fýrisvellir in a New Interpretation] ISBN 978-91-981859-5-9, ISBN 978-91-981859-7-3.
- Att tolka Svitjod (2012) [To interpret Svitjod] ISBN 978-91-981859-4-2, ISBN 978-91-637-5725-9.
- Särkland och dess källmaterial (2011) [Serkland and its Source Material] ISBN 978-91-981859-3-5, ISBN 978-91-637-5727-3.
- Ingvarståget och dess monument (2010) [The Ingvar Expedition and its Monuments] ISBN 978-91-981859-2-8, ISBN 978-91-637-5724-2.

== Distinctions ==
- (Sweden) The Royal Patriotic Society's large medal in gold (PatrSstGM) (2008)
- (Hungary) Knight of the Hungarian Order of Vitéz (2024)
