= Loud Pipes (band) =

Swedish band

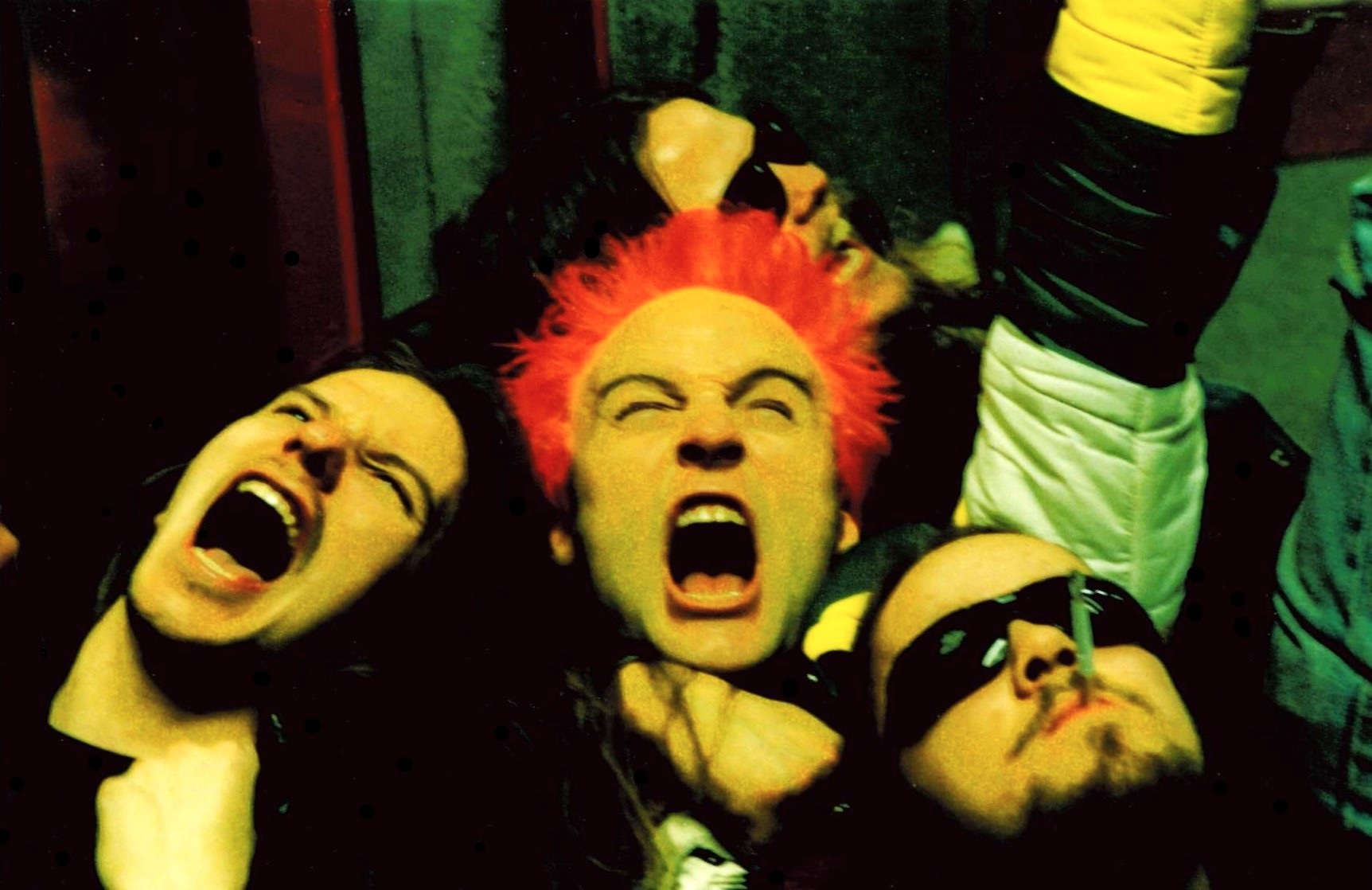
Loud Pipes in the Stockholm subway 1994. From L to R clockwise: Fredrik Lindgren ("Freddie Eugene"), Fredrik Karlén, Peter Stjärnvind. In the middle: Nandor Condor.

Loud Pipes (aka Loudpipes) were a Swedish hardcore punk band, active from 1994 to 1997, founded by Fredrik Lindgren (aka Freddie Eugene), and consisting of members from famous Swedish death metal and thrash metal bands (Unleashed, Merciless, Entombed, and Unanimated). They made one album, one EP and a split-single during their existence, and also appeared on several compilation records. The members of the band were Fredrik Lindgren, Fredrik Karlén, Peter Stjärnvind, and Nandor Condor. They were initially signed with the Swedish label Burn Records, which Lindgren later also co-managed, and from 1996 with the French label Osmose Productions. Drunk Forever (1995) was produced by the band and Tomas Skogsberg, and also features a talk intro by Jari 'Finn-fan' Juho of legendary fanzine Sika Äpärä. Downhill Blues (1997) was produced by the band and Nico Elgstrand ('Flat Cap Tiger'), and included guest backing vocalists Izmo Ledderfejs and 'Leffe Slaktsvärdsvin' (Leffe Hog; i.e. Carl L. Thunberg). Fredrik Lindgren died on 5 January 2025, at the age of 53.

== Members ==
- Fredrik Lindgren (aka Freddie Eugene): Guitar/Backing vocals
- Fredrik Karlén: Bass/Backing vocals
- Peter Stjärnvind: Drums/Backing vocals
- Nandor Condor: Vocals

== Discography ==
Studio albums

- 1995: Drunk Forever (CD EP)
- 1997: The Down Hill Blues

7" Vinyls

- 1995: Loud Pipes / Essoasso – Stupid Stupid / In Tradition (Split single)
- 1997: Headbangers Against Disco Vol. III (V/A EP)

Various artists compilations

- 1996: Ultimate Swedish Slash And Burn Volume II (V/A)
- 1996: Frank Wants You To Join The 1996 Punk Rock'N'Roll Horrorshow (V/A)
- 1997: The World Domination II (V/A)
- 1998: The World Domination III (V/A)
- 1998: Osmose Productions (V/A Promo)
- 1998: Hard N' Heavy Vol. 1 (V/A)
