= Spir Mountain Cairns =

Bronze age cairns in Sweden

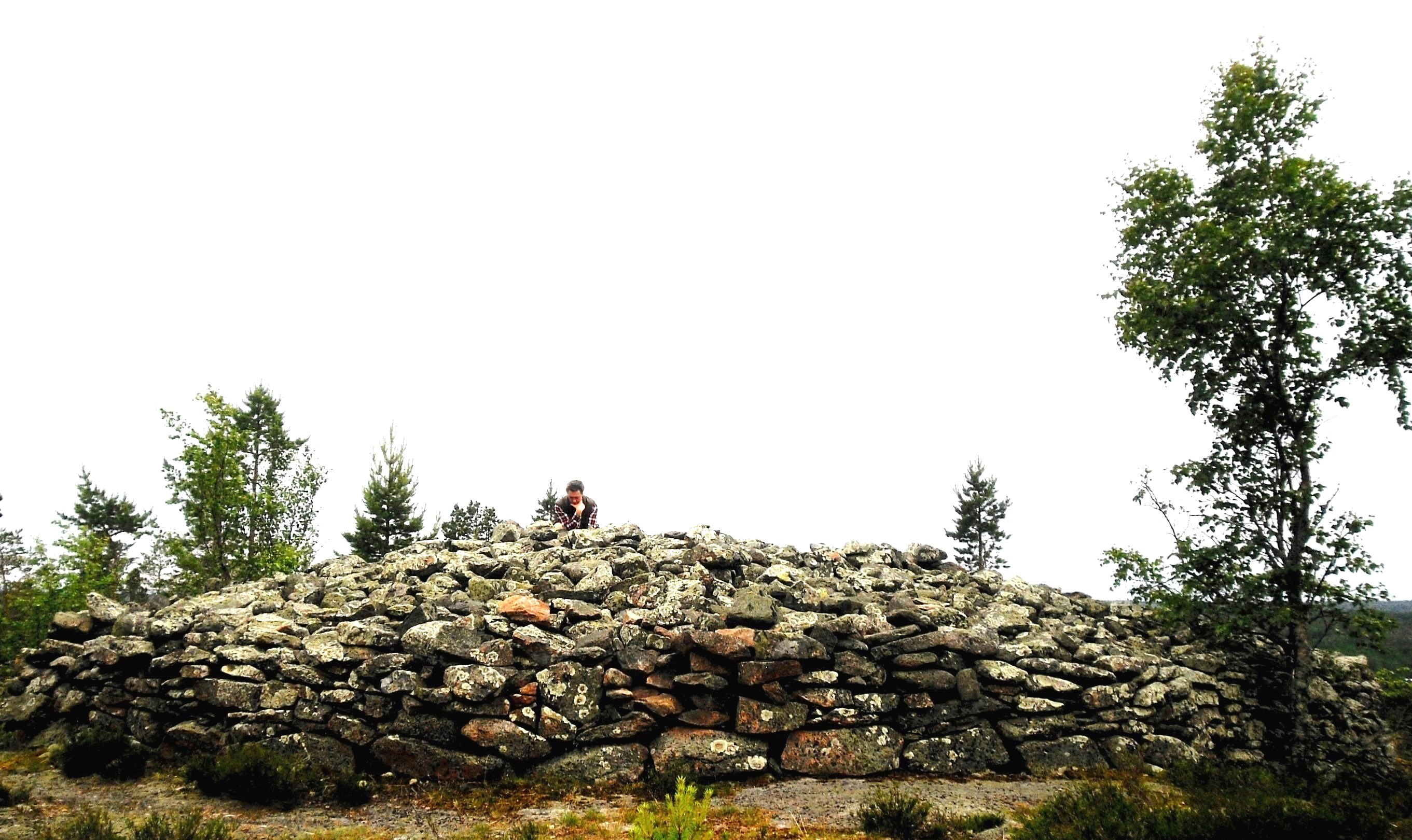
The larger of the Spir Mountain Cairns during inventory 2013 by archaeologist Carl L. Thunberg.

The Spir Mountain Cairns (Swedish: Spirbergsrösena) are two well preserved Bronze Age cairns in Ångermanland, Norrland, Sweden, built as graves and burial monuments, with burial cists interred. The ancient site is located at the top of the mountain Spirberget by Lake Mosjön in the Grundsunda parish, north of Örnsköldsvik at the High Coast in Ångermanland. The name Spirbergsrösena (English: The Spir Mountain Cairns) was introduced by archaeologist Carl L. Thunberg as a formal name concept for the site in 2014 before a public lecture on behalf of the Swedish National Heritage Board, in connection with that year's Swedish national "Archaeology Day".
