= Death in Pieces =

Studio album by Centinex
- Released: 29 May 2020
- Genre: Swedish death metal
- Length: 32:35
- Label: Agonia Records

Centinex chronology
Doomsday Rituals (2016)	Death in Pieces (2020)	With Guts and Glory (2025)

Death in Pieces is the eleventh studio album by the Swedish death metal band Centinex, released in 2020 on Agonia Records.

It marked Centinex's return four years after the preceding album. The only remaining member of the band was Martin Schulman, with all other members being new for this album.

== Reception ==
Rock Hard were rather impressed, grading the album as 8.5 out of 10. The same score was given by Powermetal.de, whose reviewer praised the songwriting as exciting. "Here, the music isn't relentlessly relentless from beginning to end; instead, breaks and tempo changes are skillfully incorporated", resulting in "a surprisingly diverse collection of songs". Metal.de was only slightly below that with an 8/10 score. Centinex played "typical, memorable death metal" with passion and soul, rendering an "energetic" and "incredibly fresh" output.

Metal Hammer Germany only bestowed 3 out of 7 points on Death in Pieces. The album suffered from a "lack of ideas", with Centinex paying too much "tribute" to Florida death metal bands. "Innovation and variety fall by the wayside", the reviewer opined. Albeit the album felt unnecessary, it also offered "some enjoyment here and there".

In Sweden, the newspaper Nya Wermlands-Tidningen called Centinex "meat and potatoes death". The record was "quite good", but with Centinex following "the template for this type of death metal", the reviewer got no kick out of it. However, the rather short playing time paved the way for multiple listens.

== Track listing ==
No.	Title	Length
1.	"Only Death Remains"	2:48
2.	"Derelict Souls"	3:58
3.	"God Ends Here"	2:55
4.	"Tomb of the Dead"	3:51
5.	"Human Torch"	2:58
6.	"Pieces"	2:08
7.	"Cauterized"	3:08
8.	"Beyond the Dark"	3:28
9.	"Sacrifice"	3:38
10.	"Skin Turning Grey"	3:43
