= Västernorrlands Museum =

Regional museum in Sweden

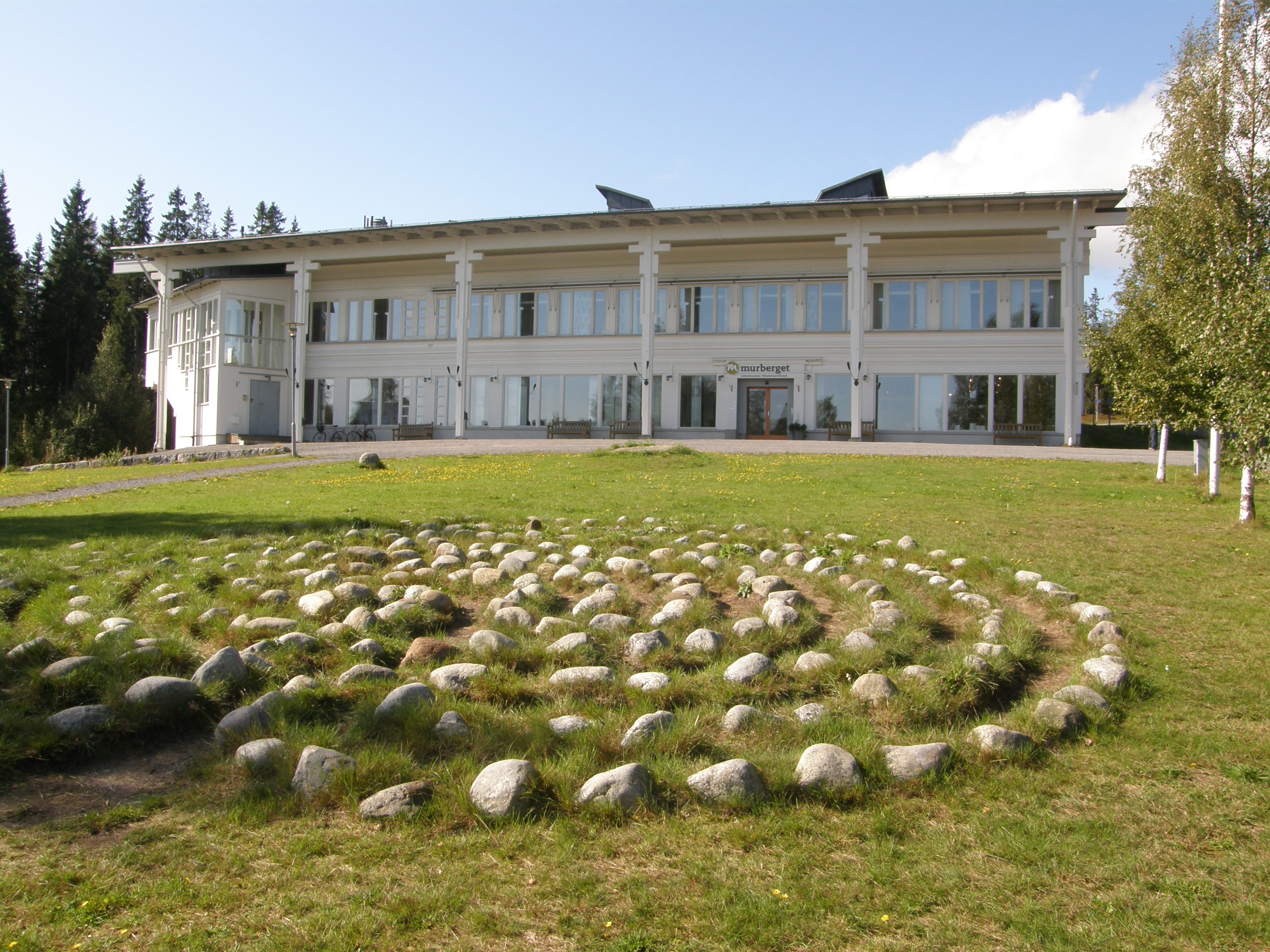
Västernorrlands Museum. The head office building in Härnösand.

Västernorrlands Museum (Swedish: Västernorrlands Museum a.k.a. Länsmuseet Västernorrland) is the official museum of Västernorrland, Sweden. As one of Sweden's 24 county museums, Västernorrlands Museum is an authority with the official responsibility for preserving the cultural heritage of Västernorrland and transmitting its history. The collections are based on history, archaeology, ethnology, culture and art. The museum's head office is currently located at Härnösand in Härnösand Municipality. Among the museum's many activities, the extensive exhibition activities are one of the most important. Other very important activities concern the preservation of old buildings and the care of the county's cultural heritage environments and archaeological sites, a work that is carried out in collaboration with the County Administrative Board of Västernorrland (Swedish: Länsstyrelsen Västernorrland). The museum serves all inhabitants in the county. It documents both prehistorical and historical structures in the county and promotes the visiting of them. The current museum director is Åsa Stenström and the current chair is Carl L. Thunberg. Among the areas covered by the museum is the UNESCO World Heritage Site of the High Coast area (Swedish: Höga Kusten).

== History ==
The history of the museum began in 1880 when Bishop Lars Landgren took the first initiative on founding a museum. On 27 February that year the Vesternorrlands läns museisällskap (English: The Vesternorrland county museum society) was formed. The first collection consisted of 66 exotic objects from the South Seas and South America, donated by captain Daniel Norlin. After Bishop Landgren's death in 1888, the museum society led a waning existence for two decades. In 1909 Theodor Hellman initiated Föreningen för norrländsk hembygdsforskning (English: The Association for Northern Homeland Research). Hellman's vision was to create a northern farming community in miniature and a center for research and teaching about culture, history and nature in northern Sweden. The great role model at the time was Skansen in Stockholm, created by Artur Hazelius. Hellman was the museum's director until 1946. In 1947, the former's son Bo Hellman took over as director of the museum, and during his time the urban development at Murbergstorget was added. He also developed the archaeological activity and started a documentation of the archaeological settlement of the entire county of Västernorrland. The open-air museum Murberget, which is one of the parts of the Västernorrlands Museum, has ever since 1929 been the second largest open-air museum in Sweden, after Skansen.

== Museum directors ==
- 1909–1946: Theodor Hellman
- 1947–1976: Bo Hellman
- 1977–2000: Tommy Puktörne
- 2001–2012: Bengt Edgren
- 2012–2015: Lillian Rathje
- 2015: Robert Olsson
- 2016–2026: Jenny Samuelsson
- 2026: Karin Forsell (Interim director)
- 2026 – : Åsa Stenström

== Chairs ==
- 1978–1979: Helge Sundin
- 1980–1991: Rut Sandström
- 1992–2006: Kerstin Nygren
- 2007–2010: Kenneth Westin
- 2011–2014: Sverker Ågren
- 2015–2018: Brita Wessinger
- 2019–2022: Thomas Näsholm
- 2023 – : Carl L. Thunberg

== See also ==
- Stockholm County Museum
