= Good Evening, Mr. Wallenberg =

- Directed by: Kjell Grede
- Written by: Kjell Grede
- Produced by: Katinka Faragó
- Starring: Stellan Skarsgård
- Cinematography: Esa Vuorinen
- Release date: 5 October 1990
- Running time: 118 minutes
- Country: Sweden
- Language: Swedish

Good Evening, Mr. Wallenberg (Swedish: God afton, Herr Wallenberg – En Passionshistoria från verkligheten) is a 1990 film about Swedish World War II diplomat Raoul Wallenberg, who was instrumental in saving the lives of thousands of Hungarian Jews from the Holocaust. He is played by Stellan Skarsgård.

The film won four awards at the 26th Guldbagge Awards: Best Film (Katinka Faragó), Best Direction (Kjell Grede), Best Screenplay (Kjell Grede), and Best Cinematography (Esa Vuorinen). It was also entered into the 41st Berlin International Film Festival. The film was selected as the Swedish entry for the Best Foreign Language Film at the 63rd Academy Awards, but was not accepted as a nominee.

== Cast ==
- Stellan Skarsgård as Raoul Wallenberg
- Katharina Thalbach as Mária
- Károly Eperjes as László Szamosi
- Miklós Székely B. as Ferenc Moser
- Erland Josephson as Rabbi
- Franciszek Pieczka as Papa
- Jesper Christensen as Officer at Watteau
- Ivan Desny as General Schmidthuber (a portrayal of real-life Pál Szalai)
- Géza Balkay as Gábor Vajna
- Percy Brandt as Swedish Ambassador
- Tamás Jordán as member of the Jewish Council
- Andor Lukáts as Father at the train
- Gábor Reviczky as Officer at the Gate
- László Soós as Adolf Eichmann
- Franciska Györy as Júlia
- Zsuzsa Szabó as Lilith
- László Csákányi as Gimpel
- István Mészáros as Pál

== See also ==
- List of submissions to the 63rd Academy Awards for Best Foreign Language Film
- List of Swedish submissions for the Academy Award for Best Foreign Language Film
