= Sworn Allegiance =

Studio album by Unleashed
- Released: July 26, 2004
- Genre: Death metal
- Length: 44:41
- Label: Century Media

Unleashed chronology
Hell's Unleashed (2002)	Sworn Allegiance (2004)	Midvinterblot (2006)

Professional ratings
Review scores
Source	Rating
Allmusic	4.5/5 stars

Sworn Allegiance is the seventh studio album by the Swedish death metal band Unleashed. It was released in 2004 on Century Media Records, their last recording for the label.

== Track listing ==
All songs written by Unleashed.

No.	Title	Length
1.	"Winterland"	3:03
2.	"Destruction (of the Race of Men)"	2:56
3.	"Only the Dead"	3:59
4.	"The Longships Are Coming"	4:10
5.	"Helljoy"	3:05
6.	"Insane for Blood"	4:00
7.	"I Bring You Death"	3:21
8.	"Attack!"	1:40
9.	"C.E.O."	2:28
10.	"One Night in Nazareth"	3:13
11.	"Praised Be the Lord"	2:25
12.	"Metalheads"	3:14
13.	"To Miklagård"	3:42
14.	"Long Live the Beast"	3:25
Total length:		44:41

== Personnel ==
- Johnny Hedlund – vocals, bass
- Fredrik Folkare – guitar
- Tomas Olsson – guitar
- Anders Schultz – drums
