= Subconscious Lobotomy =

Studio album by Centinex
- Released: October 1992
- Recorded: July 1992
- Genre: Death metal
- Length: 35:26
- Label: Underground Records
- Producer: Tomas Skogsberg; Centinex

Centinex chronology
End of Life (demo) (1991)	Subconscious Lobotomy (1992)	Malleus Maleficarum (1996)

Professional ratings
Review scores
Source	Rating
Metal.de	8/10 stars
Powermetal.de	8.5/10 stars
Metal Temple	5/10 stars

Subconscious Lobotomy is the debut album by Swedish death metal band Centinex. The original CD version was only pressed to 1000 copies worldwide. It was re-released in 2013.

== Track listing ==
No.	Title	Length
1.	"Blood On My Skin"	5:33
2.	"Shadows Are Astray"	3:28
3.	"Dreams Of Death"	2:47
4.	"Orgy In Flesh"	5:13
5.	"End Of Life"	4:30
6.	"Bells Of Misery"	4:09
7.	"Inhuman Dissections Of Souls"	4:39
8.	"The Aspiration"	3:04
9.	"Until Death Tear Us Apart"	2:03

== Personnel ==
- Andreas Evaldsson – guitar
- Joakim Gustavsson – drums
- Erik Håkansson – vocals
- Martin Schulman – bass
- Mattias Lamppu – vocals
