= Doomsday Rituals =

Studio album by Centinex
- Released: 2016
- Genre: Swedish death metal
- Length: 32:10
- Label: Agonia Records

Centinex chronology
Redeeming Filth (2014)	Doomsday Rituals (2016)	Death in Pieces (2020)

Doomsday Rituals is the tenth studio album by the Swedish death metal band Centinex, released in 2016 on Agonia Records.

== Reception ==
Powermetal.de rated the album with 8 out of 10 points, stating that the band avoided being "boring", "dull" or "uninspired" by drawing the listener in with "magical groove". Without "fiddling" and "sprawling", the band set out for "simplicity" and the result was a "must-have for fans of groovy death metal with powerful vocals". The same score was given by Dead Rhetoric, noting that Centinex had gone back to their roots with "ultra-simplistic", "meat-and-potatoes" death metal. Abandoning melody and experiments, the band did achieve "groove, momentum, and heaviness".

Rock Hard were rather unimpressed, grading the album as 6 out of 10. Likewise, Metal Hammer bestowed 2.5 out of 5 points on Doomsday Rituals. After reforming, the band had adopted a "far more straightforward and accessible form of death metal with big fat power chords and no blastbeats. It’s music the band could have written in their sleep, and that safe yet quite effective move has been repeated here". Doomsday Rituals "lacks ambition" and bore witness to a band that stayed "inside their comfort zone".

In Sweden, Slavestate gave 4 points, stating that expectations were high after Redeeming Filth, but that Doomsday Rituals exceeded those expectations.

== Track listing ==
No.	Title	Length
1.	"Flesh Passion"	3:15
2.	"From Intact to Broken"	2:36
3.	"Dismemberment Supreme"	3:21
4.	"Generation of Flies"	3:46
5.	"The Shameful Few"	3:38
6.	"Doomsday"	2:09
7.	"Exist to Feed"	3:16
8.	"Death Decay Murder"	3:44
9.	"Sentenced to Suffer"	2:44
10.	"Faceless"	3:41
