= 26th Guldbagge Awards =

Annual Swedish film awards ceremony

- Date: 11 February 1991
- Site: Palladium, Stockholm, Sweden

Highlights
- Best Picture: Good Evening, Mr. Wallenberg

The 26th Guldbagge Awards ceremony, presented by the Swedish Film Institute, honored the best Swedish films of 1990, and took place on 11 February 1991. Good Evening, Mr. Wallenberg directed by Kjell Grede was presented with the award for Best Film.

== Awards ==
- Best Film: Good Evening, Mr. Wallenberg by Kjell Grede
- Best Director: Kjell Grede for Good Evening, Mr. Wallenberg
- Best Actor: Börje Ahlstedt for The Rabbit Man
- Best Actress: Malin Ek for The Guardian Angel
- Best Screenplay: Kjell Grede for Good Evening, Mr. Wallenberg
- Best Cinematography: Esa Vuorinen for Good Evening, Mr. Wallenberg
- Best Foreign Language Film: Time of the Gypsies by Emir Kusturica
- Creative Achievement:
  - Marie-Louise De Geer Bergenstråhle
  - Mattias Nohrborg
