= Centinex =

Swedish death metal band

- Origin: Sweden
- Genres: Death metal, melodic death metal
- Years active: 1990–2006; 2014–present
- Labels: Candlelight, Cold, Repulse
- Members: Johan Ahlberg; Ronnie Bergerstahl; Johan Jansson; Jonas Kjellgren; Martin Schulman
- Website: centinex.net

Centinex is a Swedish death metal band formed in 1990. They disbanded on 12 April 2006. They were scheduled to perform their final concert in Eskilstuna, Sweden, on 13 May 2006, but cancelled. Some members went on to form death metal band Demonical. In January 2014, Centinex reformed. They were scheduled to tour in 2025, however these plans were postponed due to lead vocalist Henka Andersson undergoing chemotherapy after being diagnosed with Hodgkin's lymphoma. The band's most recent album, With Guts and Glory, was also postponed due to this. Prior to the album's release, the band stated: "This record is about pleasing ourselves first and foremost. We didn’t try to chase trends or expectations. We simply wrote the music we love. Heavy, intense, and with no apologies." AllMusic described the band as "less expressive" than other Swedish death metal bands such as In Flames or At the Gates.

== Band members ==
=== Current line-up ===
- Martin Schulman – bass
- Jörgen Kristensen – guitar
- Florian Rehn – drums
- Henka Andersson – vocals

=== Former members ===
- Alexander Högbom – vocals
- Erik Håkansson- vocals (1992)
- Mattias Lamppu – vocals (1990–1998)
- Johan Jansson – vocals (1998–2006)
- Lasse Eriksson – vocals
- Andreas Evaldsson – guitar (1990–1998)
- Kenneth Wiklund – guitar (1997–2001)
- Jonas Kjellgren – guitar (1998–2006)
- Daniel Fägnefors – guitar (1993)
- Joakim Gustavsson – drums (1992–1993)
- Kennet Englund – drums (2000–2003) (Uncanny)
- Ronnie Bergerståhl – drums (2003–2006)
- Fred Estby – drums (Dismember, Carnage, Terra Firma)

== Discography ==
=== Studio albums ===
- Subconscious Lobotomy (1992)
- Malleus Maleficarum (1996)
- Reflections (1997)
- Reborn Through Flames (1998)
- Hellbrigade (2000)
- Diabolical Desolation (2002)
- Decadence – Prophecies of Cosmic Chaos (2004)
- World Declension (2005)
- Redeeming Filth (2014)
- Doomsday Rituals (2016)
- Death in Pieces (2020)
- With Guts and Glory (2025)

=== Compilations ===
- Bloodhunt / Reborn Through Flames (2003)

=== Demos, singles and EPs ===
- End of Life (demo, 1991)
- Under the Blackened Sky (demo, 1993)
- Transcend the Dark Chaos (EP, 1994)
- Sorrow of the Burning Wasteland/Diabolical Ceremonies (split, 1995)
- Shadowland (single, 1998)
- Bloodhunt (EP, 1999)
- "Apocalyptic Armageddon" (single, 2001)
- Hail Germania (split, 2003)
- "Deathlike Recollections" (single, 2003)
- Live Devastation (EP, 2004)
- Teutonische Invasion (EP, 2013)
- The Pestilence (EP, 2022)
