= Hammer Battalion =

Studio album by Unleashed
- Released: June 9, 2008
- Genre: Death metal
- Length: 44:28
- Label: Steamhammer
- Producer: Fredrik Folkare

Unleashed chronology
Midvinterblot (2006)	Hammer Battalion (2008)	As Yggdrasil Trembles (2010)

Professional ratings
Review scores
Source	Rating
About.com	4/5 stars

Hammer Battalion is the ninth studio album by the Swedish death metal band Unleashed. It was recorded at Fredrik Folkare's recording studio in Sweden and released on 10 June 2008, by Steamhammer (a division of SPV records). A music video was shot for Black Horizon, and it debuted on MTV Headbangers blog.

== Track listing ==
No.	Title	Length
1.	"The Greatest of All Lies"	3:22
2.	"Long Before Winter's Call"	3:51
3.	"Your Children Will Burn"	2:57
4.	"Hammer Battalion"	3:29
5.	"This Day Belongs to Me"	2:38
6.	"Marching Off to War"	3:50
7.	"Entering the Hall of the Slain"	3:33
8.	"Black Horizon"	3:54
9.	"Carved in Stone"	3:19
10.	"Warriors of Midgard"	3:35
11.	"Midsummer Solstice"	3:06
12.	"Home of the Brave"	2:51
13.	"I Want You Dead"	4:03
Total length:		44:28

== Personnel ==
- Johnny Hedlund – vocals, bass
- Fredrik Folkare – lead guitar
- Tomas Måsgard – rhythm guitar
- Anders Schultz – drums
