= Dawn of the Nine =

Studio album by Unleashed
- Released: 27 April 2015
- Recorded: September 2014, January 2015 at Chrome Studios, Stockholm
- Genre: Death metal
- Length: 44:52
- Label: Nuclear Blast
- Producer: Fredrik Folkare

Unleashed chronology
Odalheim (2012)	Dawn of the Nine (2015)	The Hunt for White Christ (2018)

Dawn of the Nine is the 12th studio album by the Swedish death metal band Unleashed. It was released on 27 April 2015 by Nuclear Blast Records.

== Reception ==
Professional ratings
Review scores
Source	Rating
MetalSucks	3.5/5 stars
Louder Than War	7/10 stars
Metal Storm	7/10 stars
Metal Hammer	3.5/5 stars

Dawn of the Nine received positive reviews upon its release. Metal Sucks gave the album 3.5 out of 5 stars, commenting: "there is minimal respite from the full-on, brutal assault of uptempo, ultra-precise tech-death drumming and expert riffage/shreddy guitar soloing that will melt just about any face" whilst adding praise to the simplicity of the album with "there is a tasteful simplicity to the album’s stripped-down songwriting". Louder Than War rated the album 7 out of 10, calling the album: "a solid effort, and it certainly deserves your listen". Metal Hammer gave the album 3.5 out of 5 stars, commenting: "Viking veterans get older, wiser and meaner".

== Track listing ==
All lyrics are written by Johnny Hedlund; all music is composed by Fredrik Folkare.

No.	Title	Length
1.	"A New Day Will Rise"	3:51
2.	"They Came to Die"	3:13
3.	"Defenders of Midgard"	4:37
4.	"Where Is Your God Now?"	4:24
5.	"The Bolt Thrower"	3:49
6.	"Let the Hammer Fly"	4:10
7.	"Where Churches Once Burned"	5:18
8.	"Land of the Thousand Lakes"	4:15
9.	"Dawn of the Nine"	6:41
10.	"Welcome the Son of Thor!"	4:34
Total length:		44:52

== Personnel ==
Unleashed

- Johnny Hedlund – vocals, bass
- Fredrik Folkare – lead guitar
- Tomas Olsson – rhythm guitar
- Anders Schultz – drums

Production

- Fredrik Folkar – Engineering, Production
- Pär Olofsson – Cover art
- Erik Martensson – Mastering
- Soile Siirtola – Photography
- Joakim Sterner – Layout
