= The Rabbit Man =

Kaninmannen
- Film poster
- Directed by: Stig Larsson
- Written by: Stig Larsson
- Produced by: Peter Kropenin
- Starring: Leif Andrée; Börje Ahlstedt; Stina Ekblad
- Music by: Dror Feiler
- Release date: 28 September 1990
- Running time: 97 minutes
- Country: Sweden
- Language: Swedish

The Rabbit Man (Swedish: Kaninmannen) is a 1990 Swedish drama-psychological thriller directed by Stig Larsson, about a rapist whose father unknowingly investigates his crimes for a commercial television programme. The film sparked controversy because of its nude scenes and difficult subject, handled with an unconventional narrative style.

The title refers to a nickname given by newspapers to a real rapist Larsson read about in the 1970s, who lured young girls into his apartment by telling them he was keeping rabbits there that he wanted to save from being exposed to animal testing.

Börje Ahlstedt won the award for Best Actor for his part as the rapist's father at the 26th Guldbagge Awards.

== Selected cast ==
- Leif Andrée - Hans Nääs
- Börje Ahlstedt - Bengt Nääs
- Stina Ekblad - Lollo
- Eva Engström - Maud
- Björn Gedda - Gunnar Dahlgren
- Erika Ullenius - Carla
- Krister Henriksson - Alexandersson
- Johan Rabaeus - Thommy

== Production ==
The boys and girls appearing in the gym and locker room scenes weren't professional actors but real students at Kvarnbackaskolan in Kista, as well as other schools in Stockholm. In the sequence in which Leif Andrée's character is bullied by his pupils, Stig Larsson made it clear that the boys had to hit Andrée as hard as they wanted. "We managed it on the first shot. They hit me and threw the ball in my head. It was really violent. I had a sore ass for several weeks afterwards," Andrée said.
