= Leif Andrée =

Swedish actor

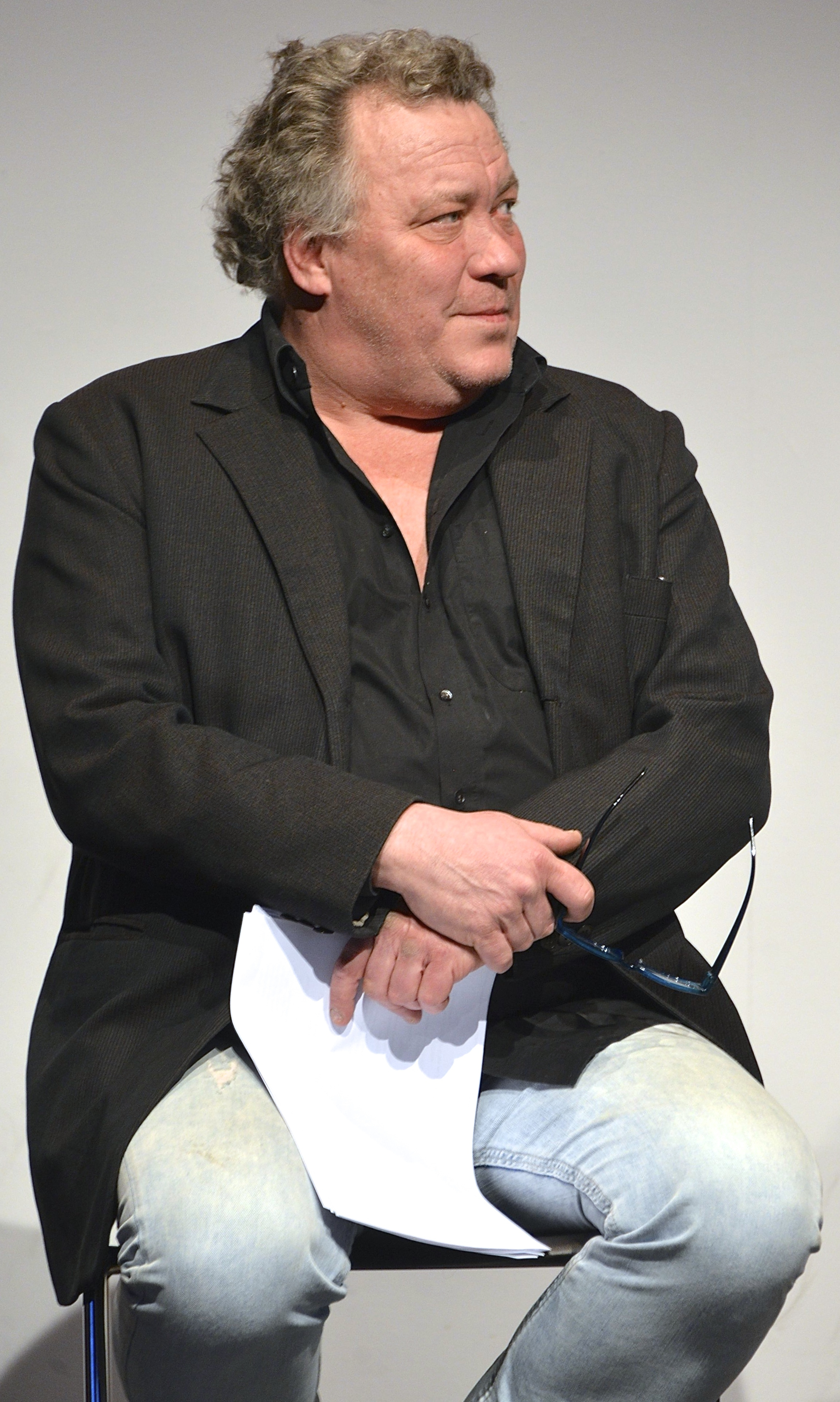
- Leif Andrée in 2013.
- Born: Leif Allan Johansson; 29 January 1958 (age 68); Stockholm, Sweden
- Occupation: Actor
- Years active: 1984–present
- Spouse: Sophia Artin
- Children: 4

Leif Allan Andrée (born Leif Allan Johansson 29 January 1958 in Stockholm) is a Swedish actor.

Andrée has been engaged at Teater Galeasen, National Swedish Touring Theatre, Chinateatern, Stockholm City Theatre and Unga Riks.

== Films ==
- Kvinnorna på taket (1989)
- 1989 – 1939
- The Rabbit Man (1990)
- 1990 – Blackjack
- "Harry Lund" lägger näsan i blöt! (1991)
- Mord och passion (1991)
- Luigis Paradis (1991)
- 1992 – Blueprint
- Min store tjocke far (1992)
- 1993 – Chefen fru Ingeborg
- 1994 – Den vite riddaren
- Sommaren (1995)
- Kalle Blomkvist - Mästerdetektiven lever farligt (1996)
- 1997 – Pelle Svanslös
- The Last Contract (1998)
- 1998 – Pip-Larssons
- 1998 - S:t Mikael
- 1998 - Rederiet
- 1999 – Eva & Adam
- Tomten är far till alla barnen (1999)
- Dykaren (2000)
- Hur som helst är han jävligt död (2000)
- Pelle Svanslös och den stora skattjakten (2000)
- Once in a Lifetime (2000)
- Om inte (2001)
- 2001 – Kaspar i Nudådalen
- Beck – Mannen utan ansikte (2001)
- 2002 – Stora teatern
- Psalmer från köket (2003)
- Number One (2003)
- 2003 – Details
- Finding Nemo (2003 - Swedish voice of Marlin)
- Om jag vänder mig om (2003)
- 2003 – c/o Segemyhr
- 2004 – The Return of the Dancing Master
- Lilla Jönssonligan på kollo (2004)
- Kyrkogårdsön (2004)
- Kim Novak badade aldrig i Genesarets sjö (2005)
- Vinnare och förlorare (2005)
- Den utvalde (2005)
- Mun mot mun (2005)
- 2005 – Coachen
- 2005 - Lasermannen
- Inga tårar (2006)
- Wallander – Jokern (2006)
- 2006 – Världarnas bok
- 2007 – Gynekologen i Askim
- Gud, lukt och henne (2008)
- 2008 – Värsta vännerna
- 2008 - Livet i Fagervik
- 2008 - Oskyldigt dömd
- Kommisarie Späck (2010)
- 2012 - Äkta Människor
- 2012 - Nobel's Last Will
- 2012 - Brave (Swedish voice of King Fergus)
- 2014 - Rio 2 (Swedish voice of Eduardo)
