= Autisterna =

Book by Stig Larsson

- First edition
- Author: Stig Larsson
- Language: Swedish
- Published: 1979
- Publisher: Alba
- Publication place: Sweden

Autisterna (Swedish for Autistic People) is a 1979 novel by Swedish writer Stig Larsson.
