= Decadence – Prophecies of Cosmic Chaos =

Studio album by Centinex
- Released: 13 February 2004
- Recorded: July and August 2003
- Studios: Black Lounge Studios (Avesta, Sweden)
- Genres: Melodic death metal, death metal
- Length: 40:23
- Label: Candlelight
- Producer: Centinex

Centinex chronology
Diabolical Desolation (2002)	Decadence – Prophecies of Cosmic Chaos (2004)	World Declension (2005)

Decadence – Prophecies of Cosmic Chaos is the sixth studio album by Swedish death metal band Centinex. It was released on 13 February 2004 through Candlelight Records.

== Reception ==
Professional ratings
Review scores
Source	Rating
AllMusic	4/5 stars
Blabbermouth.net	7.5/10
Scream Magazine	4/6 stars
Noise.fi	3/5 stars
Heavymetal.dk	8/10

Borlänge Tidning from the band's native Dalecarlia wrote that the predecessor Diabolical Desolation was flawless, but that Centinex managed to follow through and even improve slightly on Decadence. Melodic death metal could "simply not be done a lot better".

== Track listing ==
All music is composed by Centinex.

No.	Title	Lyrics	Music	Length
1.	"Arrival of the Spectrum Obscure"	Martin Schulman		4:03
2.	"Misanthropic Darkzone"	Schulman		4:34
3.	"Hollowsphere"	Schulman		4:42
4.	"Target: Dimension XII"	Schulman	Peter Bjärgö	4:30
5.	"Deathstar Unmasked"	Schulman		4:12
6.	"A Dynasty of Obedience"	(Instrumental)		2:02
7.	"Mechanical Future"	Johan Ahlberg		5:06
8.	"Cold Deep Supremacy"	Johan Jansson		5:07
9.	"New World Odyssey"	Martin Schulman		6:07
Total length:				40:23

== Credits and personnel ==
Centinex

- Martin Schulman – bass
- Jonas Kjellgren – guitar
- Johan Jansson – vocals
- Johan Ahlberg – guitar
- Kennet Englund – drums

Guest musician

- Mikael Danielsson – vocals (track 4)

Other staff

- Jonas Kjellgren – mixing, mastering
- Steve Beatty – executive producer
- Edward Christie – executive producer
- Per Gustafsson – cover art, layout
- Eric Horval – artwork (vinyl), layout
