= No Sign of Life =

Studio album by Unleashed
- Released: 12 November 2021
- Studio: Chrome Studios, Stockholm, Sweden
- Genre: Death metal
- Length: 39:19
- Label: Napalm Records
- Producer: Fredrik Folkare

Unleashed chronology
The Hunt for White Christ (2018)	No Sign of Life (2021)	Fire Upon Your Lands (2025)

Singles from Coherence
- 1. "The King Lost His Crown" Released: 2021; 2. "Where Can You Flee?" Released: 2021; 3. "You Are the Warrior!" Released: 2021

No Sign of Life is the 14th studio album by the Swedish death metal band Unleashed. It was released by the music label Napalm Records on 12 October 2021.

== Background ==
No Sign of Life was recorded at Chrome Studios in Stockholm, Sweden. It was produced and mixed by Fredrik Folkare. It was mastered by Erik Martensson. Three music videos were released for the album. The videos for "The King Lost His Crown" and "Where Can You Flee?" are lyric videos, while the video for "You Are the Warrior!" is a typical music video.

The album is a concept album based on vocalist/bassist Johnny Hedlund's unpublished novel that takes place in the world of Odalheim. There's a single plot that runs through it, and it's the same one that runs across the band's prior four releases. This isn't just another death metal album; it's the fifth installment of a gigantic, epic Viking mythological saga set after Ragnarok.

The band while speaking about the album said "It is our hope that our warriors all over the world will enjoy the new album just like they have our previous ones. We have, as always, tried to stick to our roots while testing our steel to develop the genre of Viking death metal even further. Hail Odin!"

== Reception ==
Professional ratings
Review scores
Source	Rating
Distorted Sound	8/10
Rock N' Load	10/10

The album was well received by both fans and critics. Joseph Mitchell of Rock 'N' Load said "The album "No Sign Of Life" is unrivaled. Even after 14 full-length albums, the band still has so much to contribute and create. Unleashed has been able to improve their sound since their inception. Unleashed have been able to build albums with longevity and write albums that are crushing and catchy to this day, whilst many bands have made big genre shifts or recycle the same content over and over." Furthermore, Tim Bolitho-Jones of Distorted Sound said "This is old school death metal at its finest, played rapidly, aggressively, and heavily."

== Track listing ==
No Sign of Life track listing
No.	Title	Lyrics	Music	Length
1.	"The King Lost His Crown"	Johnny Hedlund	Fredrik Folkare	3:37
2.	"The Shepherd Has Left the Flock"	Johnny Hedlund	Fredrik Folkare	4:07
3.	"Where Can You Flee?"	Johnny Hedlund	Fredrik Folkare, Tomas Masgard	3:06
4.	"You Are the Warrior!"	Johnny Hedlund	Fredrik Folkare	4:26
5.	"No Sign of Life"	Johnny Hedlund	Fredrik Folkare	3:26
6.	"The Highest Ideal"	Johnny Hedlund	Fredrik Folkare	3:04
7.	"Midgard Warriors for Life"	Johnny Hedlund	Fredrik Folkare	3:46
8.	"Did You Struggle With God?"	Johnny Hedlund	Fredrik Folkare	2:41
9.	"Tyr Wields the Sword"	Johnny Hedlund	Fredrik Folkare	2:37
10.	"It Is Finished"	Johnny Hedlund	Fredrik Folkare	3:19
11.	"Here at the End of the World"	Johnny Hedlund	Fredrik Folkare	5:04

== Personnel ==
Unleashed

- Johnny Hedlund – vocals, bass
- Fredrik Folkare – lead guitar
- Tomas Masgard - rhythm guitar
- Anders Schultz – drums

Production

- Fredrik Folkare – producer, mixing
- Erik Mårtensson - mastering

== Charts ==
Chart performance for No Sign of Life
Chart (2021)	Peak position
German Albums (Offizielle Top 100)	59
