= Gene fornby =

Archaeological site in Sweden

Coordinates: 63°15′N 18°42′E

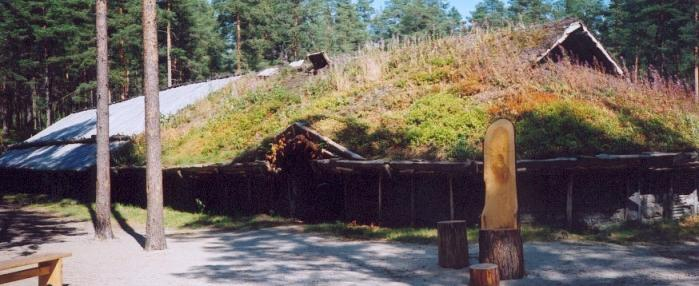
Reconstructed longhouse at Gene Fornby

Gene Fornby is a reconstructed Iron Age settlement just outside Örnsköldsvik, in Västernorrland County, Sweden.

== History ==
The earliest traces of human activity found in the area date back to the Nordic Bronze Age, but the settlement itself dated back to the Roman Iron Age, from around the years 400-600 AD. At the time of its occupation, the settlement was located at what was then the shoreline, but due to the post-glacial rebound in the area, the waterline is now about 500 metres (1,600 ft) away from the settlement.

== Excavation ==
Historically it was known that there were burial mounds on top of Genesmon, but it was not until the 1960s that they were investigated for the first time by the archaeologist Evert Baudou. Graves believed to be those of chieftains from the years 100-600 AD have been found. Gene Fornby was laid bare during archaeological excavations conducted by the University of Umeå between 1977 and 1988. The excavation revealed various buildings including a forge, believed to have been one of the largest forges in prehistoric Scandinavia. Traces of iron production and processing were uncovered as well as bronze casting and a textile works.

== Reconstruction ==
In 1991, work began on reconstructing the farm on Genesmon. A principal feature is the reconstructed longhouse. The facility opened in 1991 and became a popular tourist attraction during the summer months. All the houses are open to the public. The facility is operated by the Örnsköldsvik Museum & Art Gallery.

== Other sources ==
- Baudou, Evert (1992) Norrlands forntid : ett historiskt perspektiv (Höganäs: CEWE-forlaget) ISBN 978-91-7119-239-4
- Edblom, Lena (2004) Långhus i Gene (Institutionen för Arkeologi och Samiska Studier, Umeå universitet) ISBN 91-7305-646-4
- Lindqvist Anna-Karin and Ramqvist, Per H. (1993) Gene – en stormansgård från äldre järnålder i mellannorrland (Umeå universitet)
- Ramqvist, Per H. (1983) On the origin, function and development of sedentary Iron Age settlement in Northern Sweden (Umeå universitet) ISBN 978-91-7174-145-5
- Thunberg, Carl L. (2013) "Gene fornby: The Ancient Village of Gene", EXARC Journal Digest 2013 (Eindhoven: EXARC Journal) ISSN 2212-523X
