= Hell's Unleashed =

Studio album by Unleashed
- Released: April 29, 2002
- Genre: Death metal
- Length: 43:45
- Label: Century Media

Unleashed chronology
Warrior (1997)	Hell's Unleashed (2002)	Sworn Allegiance (2004)

Professional ratings
Review scores
Source	Rating
Allmusic	4/5 stars

Hell's Unleashed is the sixth studio album by the Swedish death metal band, Unleashed. It was released in 2002 on Century Media Records, after a five-year break from recording.

== Track listing ==
All songs written by Unleashed, unless stated otherwise

No.	Title	Length
1.	"Don't Want to Be Born"	2:54
2.	"Hell's Unleashed"	2:15
3.	"Demoneater"	3:54
4.	"Fly Raven Fly"	4:15
5.	"Mrs. Minister"	3:01
6.	"Joy in the Sun"	3:05
7.	"Demons Rejoice"	3:07
8.	"We'll Come for You"	3:08
9.	"Triggerman"	2:34
10.	"Dissection Leftovers"	2:47
11.	"Peace, Piece by Piece"	1:58
12.	"Burnt Alive"	4:01
13.	"Your Head is Mine"	3:32
14.	"Made in Hell"	3:14
Total length:		43:45

== Personnel ==
- Johnny Hedlund – vocals, bass
- Fredrik Folkare – guitar
- Tomas Olsson – guitar
- Anders Schultz – drums
