= As Yggdrasil Trembles =

Studio album by Unleashed
- Released: March 19, 2010
- Genre: Death metal
- Label: Nuclear Blast
- Producer: Fredrik Folkare

Unleashed chronology
Hammer Battalion (2008)	As Yggdrasil Trembles (2010)	Odalheim (2012)

Professional ratings
Review scores
Source	Rating
Allmusic	4/5 stars
Metal Hammer Germany	4/7
Metal.de	7/10

As Yggdrasil Trembles is the tenth studio album by the Swedish death metal band Unleashed. It was released on March 19, 2010 by Nuclear Blast Records.

== Track listing ==
All lyrics are written by Johnny Hedlund; all music is composed by Fredrik Folkare, except "Wir Kapitulieren Niemals" by Johnny Hedlund.

No.	Title	Length
1.	"Courage Today, Victory Tomorrow!"	3:54
2.	"So It Begins..."	3:24
3.	"As Yggdrasil Trembles"	4:52
4.	"Wir Kapitulieren Niemals"	3:26
5.	"This Time We Fight"	3:02
6.	"Master of the Ancient Art"	3:48
7.	"Chief Einherjar"	3:41
8.	"Return Fire"	4:04
9.	"Far Beyond Hell"	3:18
10.	"Dead to Me"	2:46
11.	"Yahweh and the Chosen Ones"	3:52
12.	"Cannibalistic Epidemic Continues"	4:59

Limited edition bonus track
No.	Title	Writer(s)	Length
13.	"Evil Dead" (Death cover)	Chuck Schuldiner	2:32

== Personnel ==
- Johnny Hedlund – vocals, bass
- Fredrik Folkare – lead guitar
- Tomas Måsgard – rhythm guitar
- Anders Schultz – drums
