= Where No Life Dwells =

Studio album by Unleashed
- Released: 17 May 1991
- Recorded: April 1991, Woodhouse Studios, Dortmund Germany
- Genre: Death metal
- Length: 36:49
- Label: Century Media
- Producer: Waldemar Sorychta

Unleashed chronology
Where No Life Dwells (1991)	Shadows in the Deep (1992)

Professional ratings
Review scores
Source	Rating
Allmusic	4/5 stars

Where No Life Dwells is the debut album by the Swedish death metal band Unleashed. It was released in 1991 by Century Media Records, and was produced by Waldemar Sorychta, who would go on to produce more Century Media acts such as Lacuna Coil.

== Critical reception ==
Jason Anderson of AllMusic rated the album 4 out of 5 stars, writing in part, "Pure and enthusiastic, this disc plays like an audio textbook for those interested in the state and design of early-'90s death metal excess... As death metal debuts go, this is a very impressive one from the stylistically myopic but musically consistent Unleashed."

== Track listing ==
- All Songs Written By Johnny Hedlund.

No.	Title	Length
1.	"Where No Life Dwells"	0:47
2.	"Dead Forever"	3:00
3.	"Before the Creation of Time"	3:49
4.	"For They Shall Be Slain"	3:20
5.	"If They Had Eyes"	3:52
6.	"The Dark One"	3:39
7.	"Into Glory Ride"	3:21
8.	"...And the Laughter Has Died"	3:22
9.	"Unleashed"	3:25
10.	"Violent Ecstacy"	3:13
11.	"Where Life Ends"	4:59
Total length:		36:49

== Personnel ==
Unleashed

- Johnny Hedlund: bass guitar, vocals
- Fredrik Lindgren: guitar
- Tomas Olsson: guitar
- Anders Schultz: drums, percussion

Production

- Executive Producer: R. Kampf
- Produced By Waldemar Sorychta
- Recorded & Engineered By Siggi Bemm
