= Odalheim =

Studio album by Unleashed
- Released: 24 April 2012
- Genre: Death metal
- Length: 42:54
- Label: Nuclear Blast
- Producer: Fredrik Folkare

Unleashed chronology
| As Yggdrasil Trembles (2010) | Odalheim (2012) | Dawn of the Nine (2015) |

Odalheim is the 11th studio album by the Swedish death metal band Unleashed. It was released on 24 April 2012 by Nuclear Blast Records.

== Track listing ==
| No. | Title | Length |
|---|---|---|
| 1. | "Fimbulwinter" | 4:11 |
| 2. | "Odalheim" | 4:29 |
| 3. | "White Christ" | 3:12 |
| 4. | "The Hour of Defeat" | 3:10 |
| 5. | "Gathering the Battalions" | 3:06 |
| 6. | "Vinland" | 3:58 |
| 7. | "Rise of the Maya Warriors" | 2:40 |
| 8. | "By Celtic and British Shores" | 3:49 |
| 9. | "The Soil of Our Fathers" | 4:55 |
| 10. | "Germania" | 3:33 |
| 11. | "The Great Battle of Odalheim" | 5:51 |

== Reception ==
Professional ratings
Review scores
| Source | Rating |
|---|---|
| Allmusic | 4/5 stars |

== Personnel ==
- Johnny Hedlund – vocals, bass
- Fredrik Folkare – lead guitar
- Tomas Måsgard – rhythm guitar
- Anders Schultz – drums
