= Om du behöver mig =

Studio album by Nektar
- Released: 7 November 2025
- Recorded: 2025
- Studio: Kungsten Studios (Gothenburg)
- Genres: Indie rock, alternative rock
- Length: 38:30
- Label: Sony Music
- Producer: Henrik Scheer

Nektar chronology
Magnolia (2024)	Om du behöver mig (2025)

Singles from Om du behöver mig
- 1. "Faller"; 2. "Den enda du har" 3. "Ge mig allt du har"

Professional ratings
Review scores
Source	Rating
Aftonbladet	4/5 stars
Göteborgs-Posten	4/5 stars

Om du behöver mig (Swedish for If You Need Me) is the second studio album by Swedish indie rock band Nektar. It was released on 7 November 2025.

== Track listing ==
All lyrics are written by Ilean Arvman except; "Faller", "November" and "Om du behöver mig" written by Ilean Arvman and Zion Merking.

Om du behöver mig track listing
No.	Title	Music	Length
1.	"Myrornas krig" (War of the Ants)	Ilean Arvman	3:26
2.	"Faller" (Falling)	Arvman	3:08
3.	"November"	Arvman, Zion Merking	3:48
4.	"Ge mig allt du har" (Give Me All You Have)	Arvman	3:13
5.	"Ossian"	Arvman	3:45
6.	"Drömmar av glas" (Dreams of Glass)	Arvman	2:21
7.	"Wien (allt som vi blev)" (Vienna (All That We Became))	Arvman	3:44
8.	"Aska" (Ash)	Arvman	3:19
9.	"Den enda du har" (The Only One You Have)	Arvman	4:46
10.	"Om du behöver mig" (If You Need Me)	Arvman, Merking	6:55

== Personnel ==
Credits adapted from the liner notes of Om du behöver mig.

Nektar

- Ilean Arvman Nelson – music, lyrics, vocals, guitar
- Leo Larsson – guitar
- Elliot Axelsson Olsson – bass
- Zion Merking – music on track 3, 10, lyrics on track 2, 3, 10, keyboards, percussion
- Isak Zander – drums

Additional musicians

- Alvis Arvman Nelson – backing vocals on track 10
- Beatrice Scholl – backing vocals on track 10
- Maria Douneni Cronholm – cello

Technical

- Henrik Scheer – producer, recording, mixing on track 6, 8
- György Barocsai – mixing on track 1–5, 7, 9, 10
- Kristoffer Göransson – mastering

== Charts ==
Weekly chart performance for Om du behöver mig
Chart (2025)	Peak position
Swedish Albums (Sverigetopplistan)	11
