= Across the Open Sea =

Studio album by Unleashed
- Released: July 1993
- Recorded: EMI Studios, Stockholm, 1993
- Genre: Death metal
- Length: 37:29
- Label: Century Media

Unleashed chronology
Shadows in the Deep (1992)	Across the Open Sea (1993)	Victory (1995)

Professional ratings
Review scores
Source	Rating
Allmusic	4/5 stars

Across the Open Sea is the third studio album by the Swedish death metal band, Unleashed. It was released in 1993 on Century Media Records. It was produced by the band itself.

== Critical reception ==
Jason Anderson of AllMusic gave the album a score of four stars out of five, and said: "Listeners fond of Unleashed will find no significant fault with Across the Open Seas and are encouraged to locate the combined version if they don't already own either of these early-'90s Euro death staples."

== Track listing ==
All songs written by Unleashed, unless stated otherwise

No.	Title	Length
1.	"To Asgaard We Fly"	3:54
2.	"Open Wide"	3:12
3.	"I Am God"	4:33
4.	"The One Insane"	3:03
5.	"Across the Open Sea"	2:45
6.	"In the Northern Lands"	3:53
7.	"Forever Goodbye (2045)"	2:27
8.	"Execute Them All"	3:20
9.	"Captured"	3:47
10.	"Breaking the Law" (Judas Priest cover)	2:13
11.	"The General"	4:22
Total length:		37:29

== Personnel ==
- Johnny Hedlund – vocals, bass
- Fredrik Lindgren – guitar
- Tomas Olsson – guitar
- Anders Schultz – drums

Guest musicians

- Stefan Westberg – organ on Across the open sea
