= Stig Olav Larsen =

Norwegian footballer (born 1973)

Personal information
- Date of birth: 29 September 1973 (age 53)
- Place of birth: Bergen, Norway
- Height: 6 ft 1 in (1.85 m)
- Position: Striker

Senior career*
Years	Team	Apps	(Gls)
- Fana IL
1997–1998	→ Hartlepool United	4	(0)
- * Club domestic league appearances and goals

Stig Olav Larsen (born 26 September 1973) is a Norwegian former football player.

Playing for Fana IL, he was loaned to Hartlepool United in December 1997, playing four league games and one Football League Trophy game, all as a substitute.
