= Fire Upon Your Lands =

Studio album by Unleashed
- Released: 15 August 2025
- Studio: Chrome Studios, Stockholm, Sweden
- Genre: Death metal
- Length: 38:05
- Label: Napalm
- Producer: Fredrik Folkare

Unleashed chronology
No Sign of Life (2021)	Fire Upon Your Lands (2025)

Singles from Fire Upon Your Lands
- 1. "War Comes Again" Released: 21 May 2025; 2. "Hold Your Hammers High!" Released: 19 June 2025; 3. "A Toast to the Fallen" Released: 18 July 2025; 4. "To My Only Son" Released: 14 August 2025

Fire Upon Your Lands is the 15th studio album by the Swedish death metal band Unleashed. It was released by the music label Napalm Records on 15 August 2025.

== Background ==
As with the previous albums, Fire Upon Your Lands was recorded at Chrome Studios in Stockholm, Sweden. It was produced and mixed by Fredrik Folkare. It was mastered by Erik Martensson. The album is a concept album based on vocalist/bassist Johnny Hedlund's unpublished novel that takes place in the world of Odalheim. There's a single plot that runs through it, and it's the same one that runs across the band's prior five releases. It's the sixth installment of a gigantic, epic Viking mythological saga set after Ragnarok.

On 21 May 2025, Unleashed released the first single "War Comes Again" while also announcing their new album Fire Upon Your Lands. On 19 June, they released the second single "Hold Your Hammers High!" On 18 July, Unleashed released the third single "A Toast to the Fallen". On 14 August, the band released the fourth single "To My Only Son".

== Track listing ==
All lyrics are written by Johnny Hedlund; all music is composed by Hedlund and Fredrik Folkare.

Fire Upon Your Lands track listing
No.	Title	Length
1.	"Left for Dead"	3:30
2.	"A Toast to the Fallen"	3:03
3.	"The Road to Haifa Pier"	3:03
4.	"War Comes Again"	4:02
5.	"Fire Upon Your Lands"	2:58
6.	"Loyal to the End"	3:17
7.	"Midjardarhaf"	3:53
8.	"Hail the Varangians!"	2:46
9.	"To My Only Son"	3:24
10.	"Hold Your Hammers High!"	4:05
11.	"Unknown Flag"	4:00
Total length:		38:05

== Personnel ==
Credits adapted from Tidal.

=== Unleashed ===
- Fredrik Folkare – electric guitar, production, mixing, engineering, mastering
- Johnny Hedlund – lead vocals, bass guitar, engineering
- Tomas Måsgard – electric guitar, engineering
- Anders Schultz – drums, engineering

=== Additional contributor ===
- Erik Mårtensson - mastering

== Charts ==
Chart performance for Fire Upon Your Lands
Chart (2025)	Peak position
Austrian Albums (Ö3 Austria)	14
German Albums (Offizielle Top 100)	25
German Rock & Metal Albums (Offizielle Top 100)	10
Polish Albums (ZPAV)	92
Swiss Albums (Schweizer Hitparade)	89
