= Warrior (Unleashed album) =

Studio album by Unleashed
- Released: June 5, 1997
- Recorded: March 1997
- Studio: EMI Studios, Stockholm, Sweden
- Genre: Death metal
- Length: 41:10
- Label: Century Media
- Producer: Fredrik Andersson, Unleashed

Unleashed chronology
Victory (1995)	Warrior (1997)	Hell's Unleashed (2002)

Professional ratings
Review scores
Source	Rating
Allmusic	3/5 stars

Warrior is the fifth studio album by the Swedish death metal band, Unleashed. It was released in 1997 on Century Media Records.

== Track listing ==
All songs written by Unleashed, unless stated otherwise

No.	Title	Length
1.	"Warmachine"	1:58
2.	"In Hellfire"	2:35
3.	"Mediawhore"	3:28
4.	"Down Under Ground"	2:52
5.	"My Life for You"	2:09
6.	"Death Metal Victory"	2:14
7.	"Hero of the Land"	3:13
8.	"Löngt Nid"	5:22
9.	"Born Deranged"	3:02
10.	"I Have Returned"	3:27
11.	"Ragnarok"	5:01
12.	"Your Pain my Gain"	1:36
13.	"The End"	4:13
Total length:		41:10

== Personnel ==
- Johnny Hedlund – vocals, bass
- Fredrik Folkare – guitar
- Tomas Olsson – guitar
- Anders Schultz – drums
