= Nektar (Swedish band) =

Swedish indie rock band

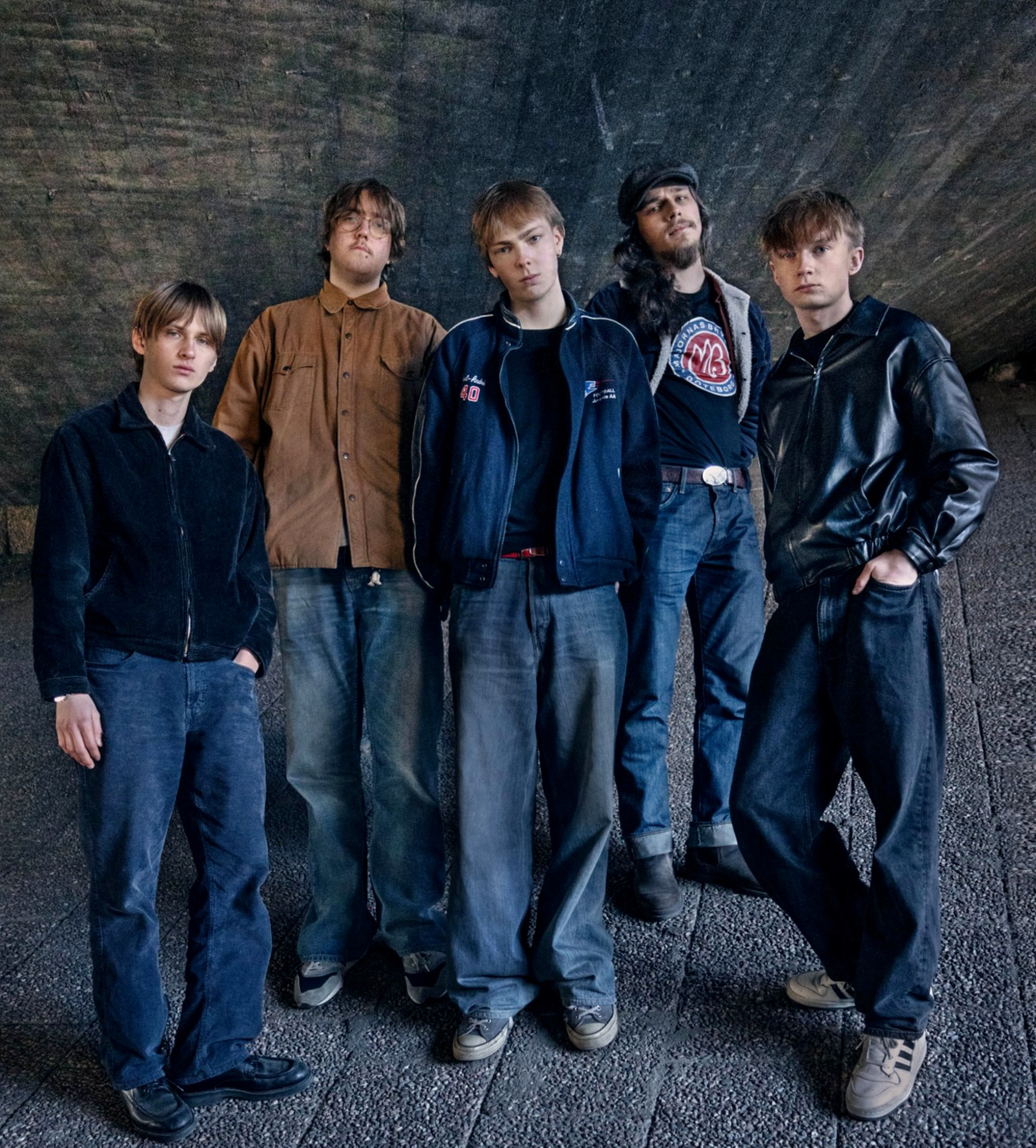
- Nektar in 2025

Background information
- Origin: Gothenburg, Sweden
- Genres: Indie rock, alternative rock
- Years active: 2023–present
- Label: Sony
- Members: Ilean Arvman Nelson; Leo Larsson; Elliot Axelsson Olsson; Zion Merking; Nils Hoff
- Past members: Isak Zander
- Website: nektar-gbg.com

Nektar is a Swedish indie rock band, formed in Gothenburg in 2023.

== History ==
The band was formed in late 2023. Their debut album Magnolia was released in September 2024. In March 2025, the band won a GAFFA Award for Breakthrough of the Year.

In June 2025, the band signed a contract with Sony Music. On 8 August, they released the single "Faller". In November 2025, Nektar released their second studio album, Om du behöver mig (Swedish for "If You Need Me"). The album was nominated for the 2026 Grammis Award for "Best Rock" and "Best Newcomer".

== Band members ==
Current members

- Ilean Arvman Nelson – lead vocals, guitars (2023–present)
- Leo Larsson – guitars (2023–present)
- Elliot Axelsson Olsson – bass (2023–present)
- Zion Merking – keyboards, percussion (2023–present)
- Nils Hoff – drums (2026–present)

Former members

- Isak Zander – drums (2023–2025)

== Discography ==
Studio albums

- Magnolia (2024)
- Om du behöver mig (2025)

Singles

- Sitt ner (lilla jag) (2024)
- Älskar dig (oändligt föralltid) (2024)
- Ord Mot Ord (2025)
- Faller (2025)
- Den enda du har (2025)
- Ge mig allt du har (2025)
- Norrort (2026)
