= Victory (Unleashed album) =

Studio album by Unleashed
- Released: February 27, 1995
- Recorded: EMI Studios, Stockholm, November – December 1994
- Genre: Death metal
- Length: 34:00
- Label: Century Media

Unleashed chronology
Across the Open Sea (1993)	Victory (1995)	Warrior (1997)

Victory is the fourth studio album by the Swedish death metal band Unleashed. It was released in 1995 on Century Media Records.

== Critical reception ==
Professional ratings
Review scores
Source	Rating
AllMusic	4.5/5 stars
Rock Hard	9.5/10

In 2005, Victory was ranked number 309 in Rock Hard magazine's book of The 500 Greatest Rock & Metal Albums of All Time.

== Track listing ==
All songs written by Unleashed, unless stated otherwise

No.	Title	Length
1.	"Victims of War"	4:13
2.	"Legal Rapes"	3:10
3.	"Hail the New Age"	3:09
4.	"The Defender"	3:19
5.	"In the Name of God"	3:44
6.	"Precious Land"	5:00
7.	"Berserk"	1:55
8.	"Scream Forth Aggression"	3:54
9.	"Against the World"	3:00
10.	"Revenge"	2:36
Total length:		34:00

== Personnel ==
- Johnny Hedlund – vocals, bass
- Fredrik Lindgren – guitar
- Tomas Olsson – guitar
- Anders Schultz – drums
