= Terra Firma (band) =

Stoner metal band from Sweden

- Origin: Sweden
- Genre: Stoner metal
- Labels: The Music Cartel; Steamhammer Records

Terra Firma was a stoner metal band formed in 1995 in Stockholm, Sweden. The group was founded as a side-project by lead vocalist Christian Lindersson (of Count Raven and Saint Vitus) and guitarist Fredrik Lindgren (of Unleashed). Terra Firma also featured the band members Izmo Hedlund on drums and Nico Moosebeach on bass, who later moved onto Entombed. The band recorded two albums, a couple of vinyl singles and appeared on a couple of compilation CDs and split 7-inch vinyl. Terra Firma played shows in Sweden and undertook European tours with band such as Atomic Bitchwax, Cathedral, Orange Goblin, Dozer, Masters of Reality, Blackshine, Dismember, Murder Squad, Entombed and Mammoth Volume. Terra Firma later broke up and Lindgren started a new band called Harms Way.

== Band members ==
- Lord Chritus - vocals
- Fredrik Lindgren - guitar
- Izmo Ledderfejs - drums
- Nico Moosebeach - bass

== Discography ==
=== Studio albums ===
- Terra Firma CD (1999 The Music Cartel)
- Harms Way CD (2001 Steamhammer Records)

=== Singles/EPs ===
- Spiral Guru Pic Disc 7-inch (1999 The Music Cartel)
