= Göran Ringbom =

Swedish musician (1944–2025)

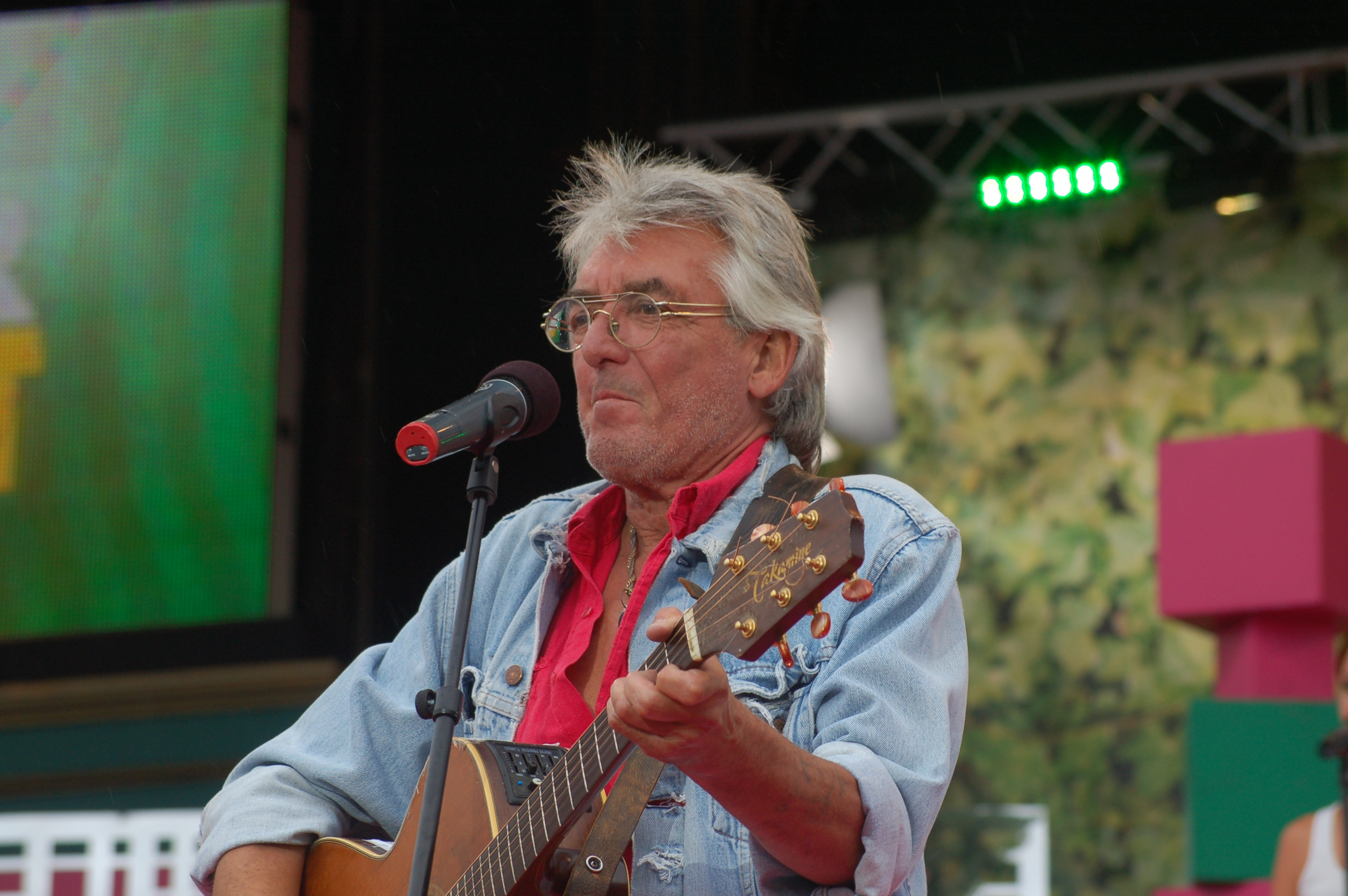
- Born: 8 June 1944; Gotland, Sweden
- Died: 9 November 2025 (aged 81); Gotland, Sweden
- Occupation: Musician
- Years active: 1976–2025
- Known for: Di sma undar jårdi

Göran Ringbom (8 June 1944 – 9 November 2025) was a Swedish musician.

== Life and career ==
Ringbom was born in Halla, Gotland on 8 June 1944. He was educated as a family therapist at Uppsala University, and for a period, ran his own restaurant and a hotel in Hamra. He was self-taught on guitar and piano and at the age of 12 he started a music group, and became a full-time musician in 1976.

Ringbom was lead singer and one of the frontmen of Di sma undar jårdi, known for the song "Snabbköpskassörskan". He left the group in 1988. He was a frequent guest in Vänersborg's Eminenta Storband.

Throughout his career, he recorded a total of 12 LPs and studio albums.

Ringbom died on 9 November 2025, at the age of 81.
