= Bjelleklang =

Norwegian a cappella vocal group

Bjelleklang (Norwegian: lit. Bell Timbre, coll. Jingle Bells) is a Norwegian a cappella vocal group formed in Lørenskog in 1986.

The group performs both songs with only a cappella and songs with guitar or other unconventional music instruments like stir pans or pots. The repertoire includes songs written by its members and cover songs with Norwegian lyrics, often translated from English with a humoristic twist.

Their first album, Dæng Dæng, was released in 1991; as of January 2015 they have published eight studio albums and one best-of album, all produced by Håkon Iversen. The debut album and several others have gone gold or platinum. Holiholihooo ..., released in 1992, is their best-selling album, with more than 70,000 copies sold, and the single "Gud! hvor du er deilig" sold 40,000.

"Feit" (1990), "Hyttetur" (1991), "Mercedes Benz" (1992) and "Gummihatt" (1994) reached the top 10 on the VG-lista singles chart, and "Gud! Hvor du er deilig" (1996) reached #1. On the albums chart, Dæng dæng (1991), Holiholihooo ... (1992), Ypper'u donk (1994) and Kort ved øra (1996) reached the top 5.

Singer Robert Skrolsvik died from amyotrophic lateral sclerosis on 10 November 2025, at the age of 65.

== Members ==
- Finn Evensen (1986–present)
- Per Henrik Gusrud (1999–present)
- Carl Einar Traaen (2002–present)

=== Former members ===
- Ole Jørgen Holt Hanssen (1986–1999)
- Jon Haaland (1986–1996)
- Arvid Rønsen Ruud (1986–1995)
- Geir Havenstrøm (1986–1987)
- Ketil Hustad (1987–1990)
- Øystein Skre (1996–2001)
- Frank Øren (1989–2025; his death)
- Robert Skrolsvik (1986–2025; his death)

== Discography ==
- Dæng Dæng (BMG Ariola, 1991)
- Holiholihooo … (BMG Ariola, 1992)
- Ypperu’ Donk (BMG Ariola, 1994)
- Synger svart (BMG Ariola, 1995)
- Kort ved øra (BMG Ariola, 1996)
- Kjære landsmenn (RCA, 1997)—best-of
- Spis meg rå (BMG Ariola, 1998)
- Jul med Bjelleklang (Columbia, 1999)
- Sokker i sandaler (Big Box Music, 2006)
- Menn, menn, menn (Big Box Music, 2009)
