= Fredrik Lindgren (musician) =

Swedish musician (1971–2025)

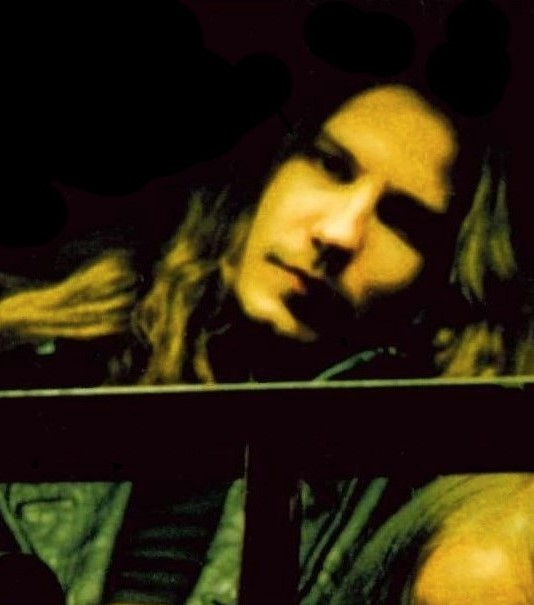
- Fredrik Lindgren in 1994.

Background information
- Also known as: Freddie Eugene
- Born: 1 February 1971; Stockholm, Sweden
- Died: 6 January 2025 (aged 53)
- Genres: Death metal, Heavy metal, Stoner rock, Punk rock
- Occupation: Musician
- Instrument: Guitar
- Years active: 1989–2025

Fredrik Eugén Lindgren (1 February 1971 – 5 January 2025), also known as Freddie Eugene, Fast Freddie Shark, and Freddie Flamethrower, was a Swedish musician. He played guitar and composed music and lyrics in various Swedish bands, including Unleashed, Loud Pipes, Terra Firma, Celestial Pain, Born of Fire, Harms Way, and Atlantic Tide.

== Life and career ==
Lindgren was a founding member and lead guitarist of death metal pioneers Unleashed in 1989 and played across the band’s first four studio albums: Where No Life Dwells (1991), Shadows in the Deep (1992), Across the Open Sea (1993), and Victory (1995). His performances can also be heard on the live albums Live in Vienna ’93 (1993) and Eastern Blood – Hail to Poland (1996). After leaving Unleashed, Lindgren became involved with several other Swedish bands, including Loud Pipes, Terra Firma, Celestial Pain, Born of Fire, Harms Way, and Atlantic Tide. In the 1990s, he also co-managed the indie record label Burn Records with Carl L. Thunberg (’Leffe Hog’), which among other things released the Ultimate Swedish Slash & Burn album series. Lindgren died on 5 January 2025, at the age of 53.

== Discography ==
=== Unleashed ===
Studio albums

- 1991: Where No Life Dwells
- 1992: Shadows in the Deep
- 1993: Across the Open Sea
- 1995: Victory

Live albums

- 1993: Live in Vienna '93
- 1996: Eastern Blood, Hail to Poland

Compilation albums

- 1992: Masters of Brutality
- 2008: Viking Raids (The Best Of 1991-2004)

Boxed sets

- 2003: ...And We Shall Triumph in Victory
- 2008: Immortal Glory (The Complete Century Media Years)

=== Loud Pipes ===
- 1995: Drunk Forever
- 1997: The Down Hill Blues

=== Terra Firma ===
- 1999: Terra Firma
- 2001: Harms Way

=== Harms Way ===
- 2006: Oxytocin

=== Atlantic Tide ===
- 2009: Eyestroids / Bad Acid Queen (7")
- 2013: Way Of Living / Aeons Of Hell (7")
- 2013: Psychic Vampire / Massacre (7")
