= När det känns att det håller på ta slut =

Book by Stig Larsson

- First edition
- Author: Stig Larsson
- Language: Swedish
- Set in: Stockholm, Sweden
- Published: 2012
- Publisher: Albert Bonniers Förlag
- Publication place: Sweden

När det känns att det håller på ta slut is a 2012 novel by Swedish writer Stig Larsson.
