= Shadows in the Deep =

Studio album by Unleashed
- Released: 1992
- Genre: Death metal
- Length: 40:15
- Label: Century Media
- Producer: Waldemar Sorychta

Unleashed chronology
Where No Life Dwells (1991)	Shadows in the Deep (1992)	Across the Open Sea (1993)

Professional ratings
Review scores
Source	Rating
Allmusic	3/5 stars
Metalstorm	(9.5/10)

Shadows in the Deep is the second album by the Swedish death metal band Unleashed. It was released in 1992 by Century Media Records.

The album was dedicated to Swedish black metal singer Per "Dead" Yngve Ohlin who had committed suicide a year prior.

== Music ==
The album's music has been described as "muscular" and "intense".

== Reception and legacy ==
Jason Anderson of AllMusic gave the album three stars out of five. He said: "Only a subtle improvement upon their first release, some might consider this a relatively constrained effort, but no fans of Unleashed -- or their European death metal genre -- should be disappointed with Shadows in the Deep."

Nirvana unofficially recorded a brief cover of the song "Onward Into Countless Battles", labeled "Meat".

== Track listing ==
No.	Title	Length
1.	"The Final Silence"	2:54
2.	"The Immortals"	4:23
3.	"A Life Beyond"	4:49
4.	"Shadows in the Deep"	5:02
5.	"Countess Bathory" (Venom cover)	4:02
6.	"Never Ending Hate"	2:32
7.	"Onward into Countless Battles"	4:14
8.	"Crush the Skull"	3:36
9.	"Bloodbath"	4:09
10.	"Land of Ice"	4:33
Total length:		40:15
