= Stig Larsson (author) =

Swedish writer, film writer, director and actor (born 1955)

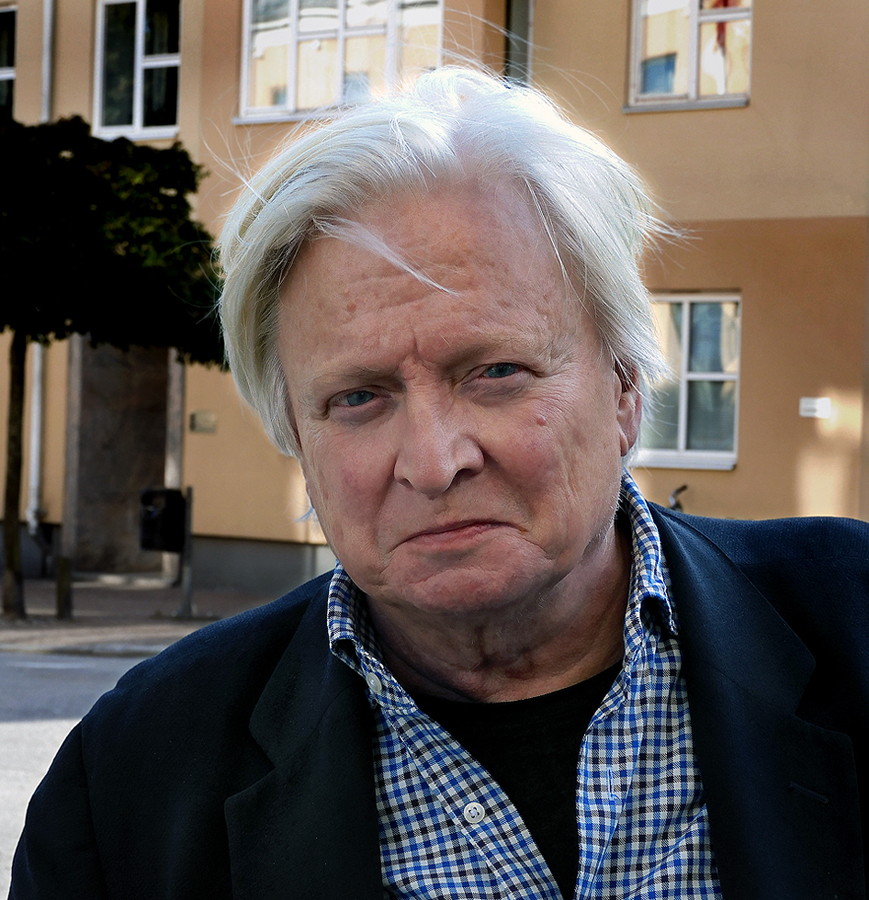
- Stig Larsson in 2021
- Born: Stig Håkan Larsson; 20 July 1955 (age 71); Skellefteå, Sweden
- Occupations: novelist, poet, film director
- Spouse: Natalie Ringler
- Writing career
- Period: 1979–2012
- Genre: Literary
- Notable work: Autisterna

Stig Håkan Larsson (born 20 July 1955) is a Swedish writer of novels, dramas, poetry, political essays and short stories, film writer, director and actor.

== Biography ==
Larsson was born on 20 July 1955, in Skellefteå, Västerbotten County. He grew up in Umeå and currently lives in Stockholm.

In the late 1970s, his namesake and friend, Stieg Larsson, born Stig, the well-known author of the Millennium series, changed slightly the spelling of his first name to avoid confusion with Stig, by then a well-known writer.

Larsson was the founder and a member of the Kris editorial staff.

His debut novel and first success was in 1979 with Autisterna. Since then, Larsson has established himself as one of Sweden's best-known and influential authors. "His instinct for psychological and emotional violence has been compared to that of August Strindberg and Ingmar Bergman."

He has published over 20 books including novels, short stories, and poetry collections. He has also written and directed internationally successful stage plays such as Vd and Systrar, bröder. In 1989, he wrote and directed his feature film debut Ängel, followed by The Rabbit Man in 1990. He has directed TV movies such as Under isen (1991) and Nigger (1991), and written screenplays for films such as Kristian Petris's acclaimed Sommaren (1995).

== Bibliography ==
=== Prose ===
- Autisterna, 1979
- Nyår, 1984
- Introduktion, 1986
- Komedin I, 1989
- Om en död, 1992 (short stories)
- När det känns att det håller på ta slut, 2012

=== Poetry ===
- Minuterna före blicken, 1981
- Den andra resan, 1982
- Samtidigt, på olika platser, 1985
- Deras ordning, 1987
- Händ!, 1988
- Ändras, 1990
- Ett kommande arbete, 1991
- Uttal, 1992
- En andra resa, 1993 (collection)
- Likar, 1993
- Ordningen, 1994 (collection)
- Matar, 1995
- Natta de mina, 1997
- Wokas lax?, 1998
- Helhjärtad tanke, 1999
- Avklädda på ett fält, 2000

=== Drama ===
- VD, 1987
- Pjäser, 1991
- Realism: två pjäser och ett filmmanus, 2011

=== Journalism and essays ===
- Artiklar 1975–2004, 2006
- Folk på ön – With photographs by Ulla Montan, 2017

== Filmography ==
=== Writer ===
1988 VD (TV movie) (play / screenplay)
1989 Ängel (writer)
1989 Miraklet i Valby (writer)
1990 The Rabbit Man (Kaninmannen)
1995 Svinet (TV film)
1995 Sommaren
1997 Grötbögen (TV film)
2000 Jesus lever (TV film)
2009 Metropía (screenplay)

=== Director ===
1988 VD (TV play)
1989 Ängel
1990 Nigger (TV film)
1990 The Rabbit Man (Kaninmannen)
1991 Under isen (TV film)
2007 August (TV film)

=== Actor ===
1984 The Element of Crime (Forbrydelsens element) (Coroner's Assistant)
1989 Ängel (Stig)
2006 Sök (Bo)
