= Unleashed (band) =

Swedish death metal band

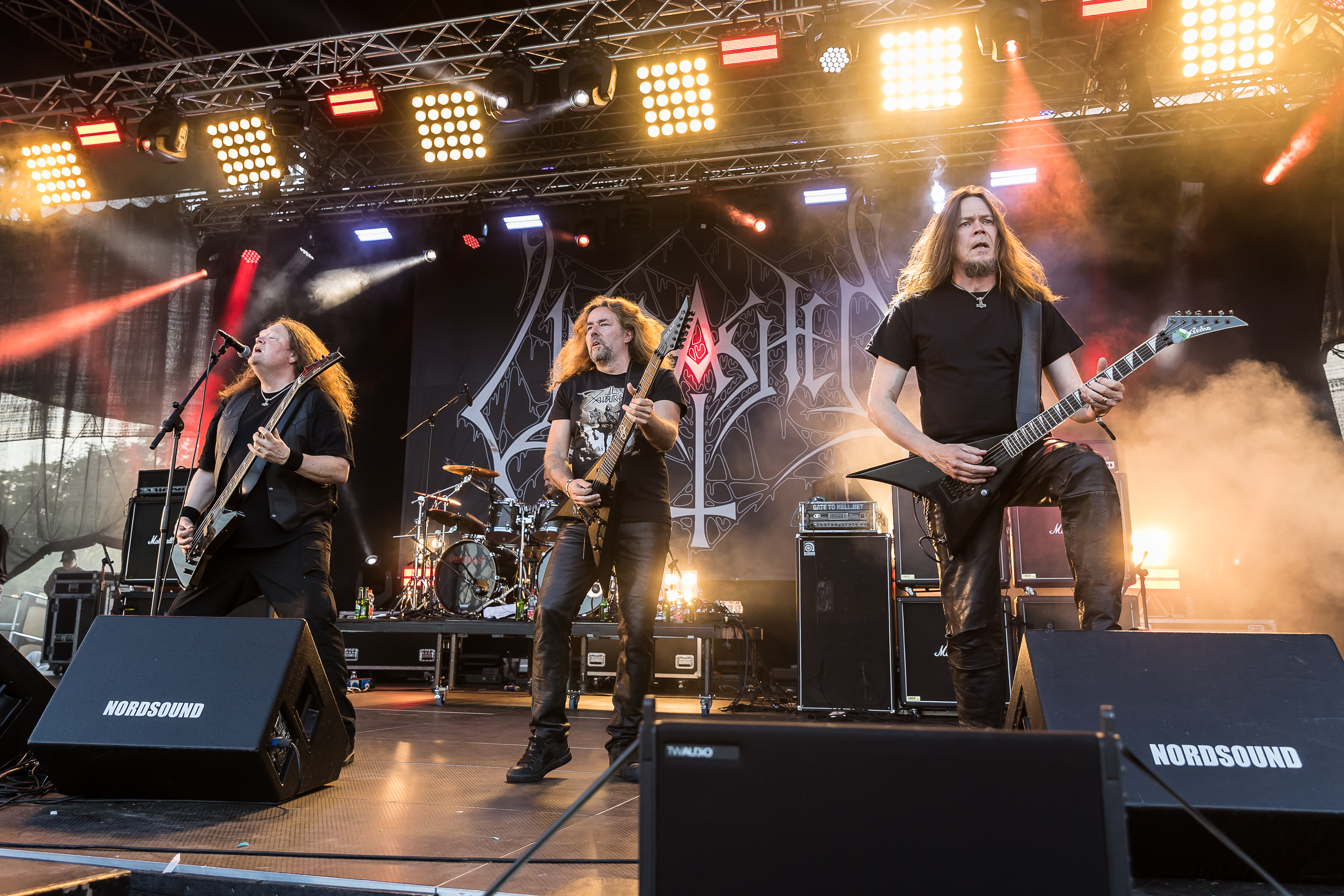
- Unleashed live at Metal Frenzy Open Air 2024 in Gardelegen

Background information
- Origin: Stockholm, Sweden
- Genre: Death metal
- Years active: 1989–present
- Labels: Century Media, Steamhammer, Nuclear Blast, Napalm Records
- Members: Johnny Hedlund; Fredrik Folkare; Tomas Måsgard; Anders Schultz
- Past members: Robert Sennebäck; Fredrik Lindgren
- Website: unleashed.se

Unleashed is a Swedish death metal band formed in 1989 by Johnny Hedlund in Stockholm. Lyrical themes include Viking culture, recollection of a pre-Christian world, and Norse folklore. A number of their recent songs contain references to J. R. R. Tolkien. Unleashed (along with Dismember, Entombed and Grave) is considered one of the "big four" of Swedish death metal.

== History ==
Unleashed was founded in 1989 by vocalist and bassist Johnny Hedlund. Unleashed recorded demos "Revenge" and "Utter Dark", which got them a deal with Century Media Records. In 1991, the band released their debut studio album, Where No Life Dwells, and toured with Morbid Angel in Europe and the US.

In 1992, Unleashed released their second studio album, Shadows in the Deep, including a cover version of Venom's "Countess Bathory". Their next studio albums were Across the Open Sea in 1993 and Victory in 1995, the latter being the last on which guitarist Fredrik Lindgren played. Lindgren focused on punk rock with his band Loud Pipes, consisting of members from Swedish death metal bands. When he left Unleashed, they replaced him with Fredrik Folkare, who played guitar on the fifth Unleashed studio album, Warrior, in 1997.

Bassist/vocalist Johnny Hedlund, founder of the band

The band went on hiatus after 7–8 years of recording and touring. They concentrated on life outside the music business, their side projects, and studying. After a reissue of the band's classics in 2002, the band released the album Hell's Unleashed in the same year, and began to tour again. This was also the year Hedlund came under scrutiny because of allegations that he was a Nazi sympathizer. Dave Grohl of Foo Fighters intended to approach Hedlund for his Probot metal project, but the album producer, Matt Sweeney, discouraged him from doing so because of Hedlund's alleged sympathies. Hedlund branded these accusations as false and stated, Unleashed praises nature, beast and man. Man....regardless of background, place of birth or color of the skin.

In 2004, Unleashed released their seventh studio album, Sworn Allegiance. In October 2006, the band released their eighth studio album, Midvinterblot. Unleashed toured Europe in November 2006 as part of the Masters of Death tour, with Grave, Dismember, and Entombed. On February and March 2007, they headlined a North American tour with Krisiun and Belphegor. June 2008 saw the release of their ninth studio album, Hammer Battalion.

On 24 July 2009, Unleashed signed with Nuclear Blast Records for the release of their tenth album, As Yggdrasil Trembles. In the press statement, the band said, "We are very much looking forward to this new cooperation! The recording of the album is scheduled for October/November this year."

In summer 2010, Unleashed was part of the Summer Breeze Open Air and the With Full Force heavy metal festivals in Germany. The band's 11th studio album, Odalheim, was released on Nuclear Blast Records in April 2012, and their twelfth record, Dawn of the Nine, was released 24 April 2015. In early 2018, Unleashed signed to Napalm Records, through whom they released their next album, The Hunt for White Christ, later that year. In February 2021, the band announced that they were working on their 14th studio album. The resulting No Sign of Life was released in late 2021.

The band played Maryland Deathfest in 2025.

== Musical style ==
Steve Huey of AllMusic described the band's sound as "brutal, unwavering death metal." He also said that the band exhibits "a basic loud-fast-rules death metal style that has remained largely unchanged but always potent."

== Members ==
Unleashed live at Metal Frenzy Open Air 2024

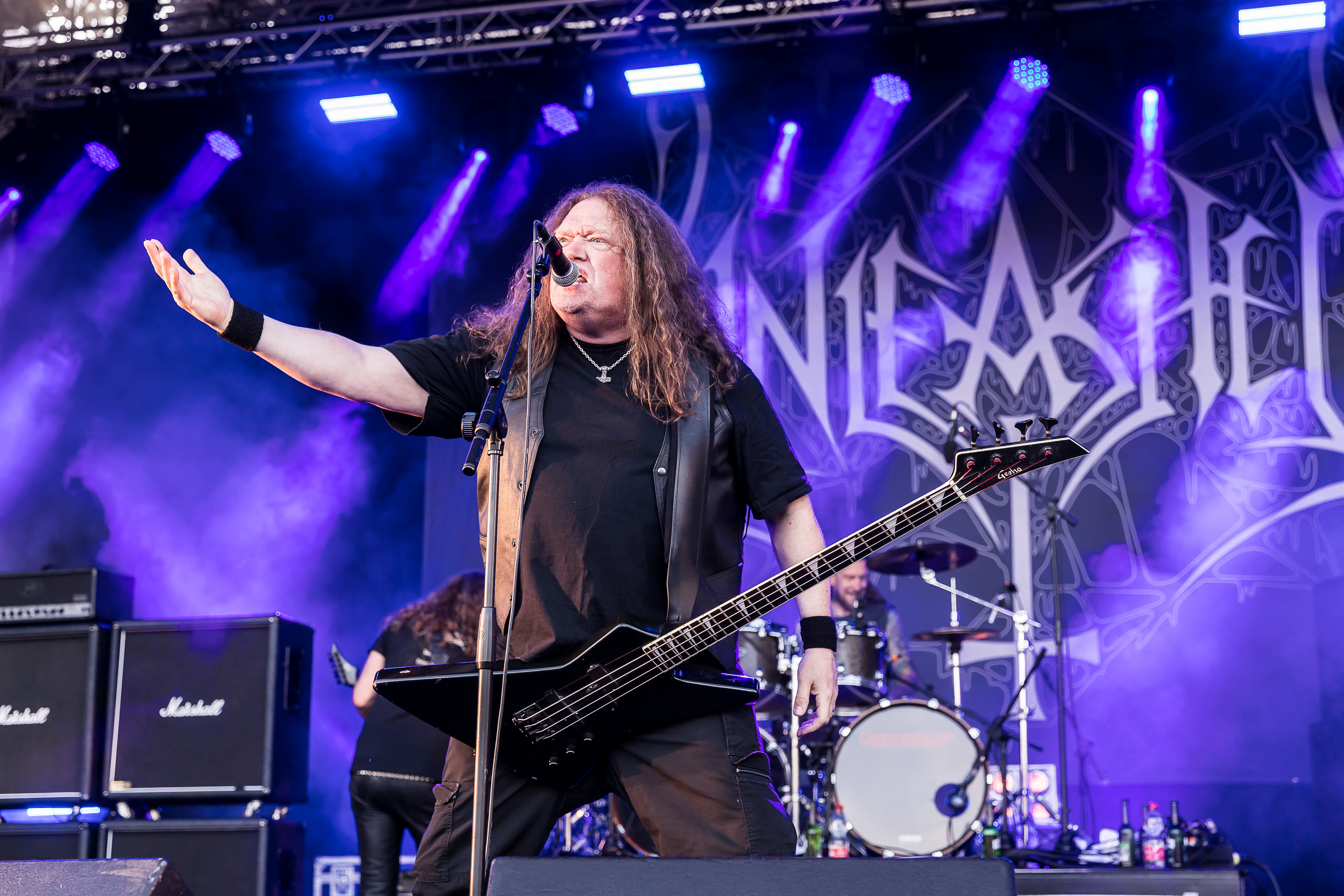
Johnny Hedlund

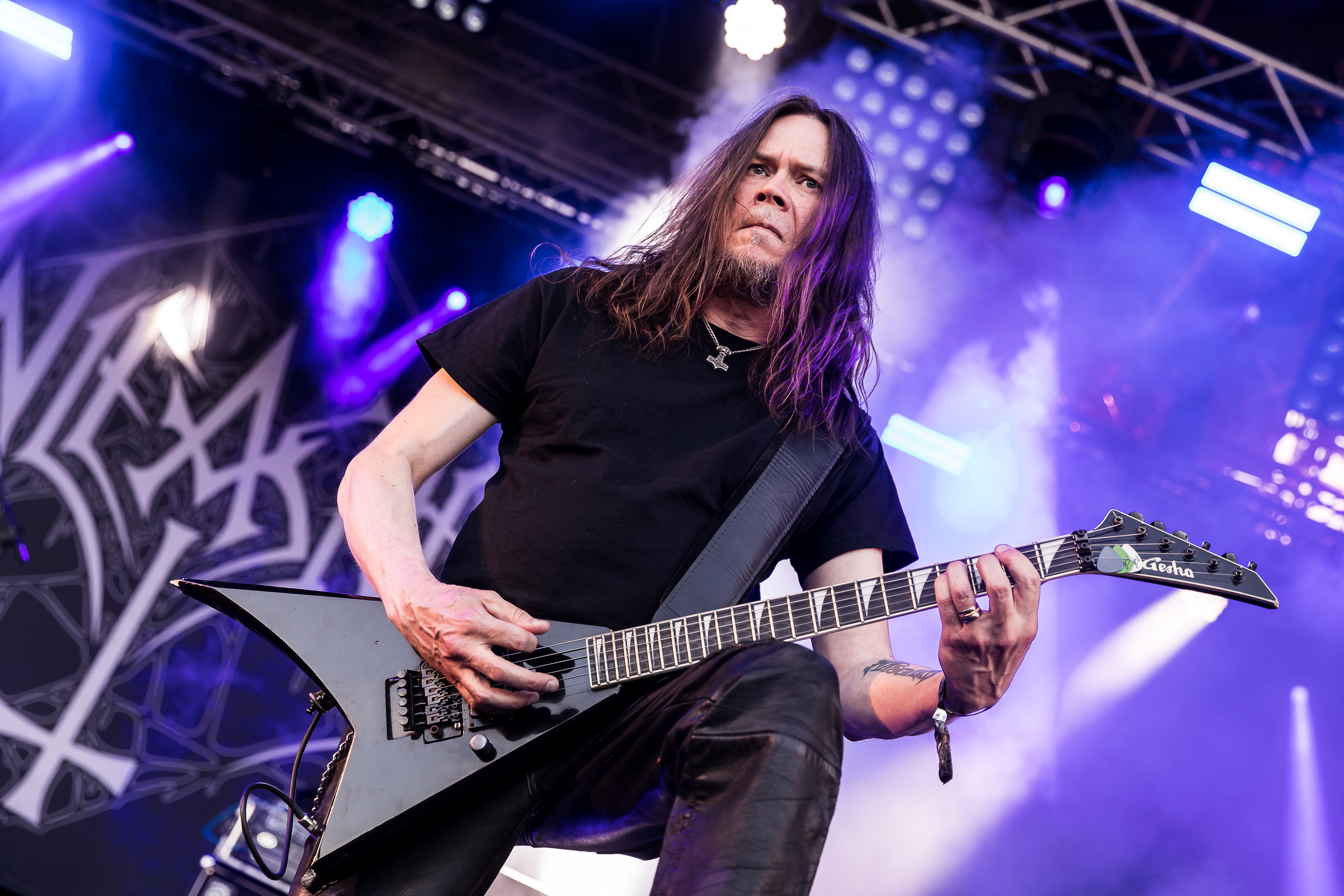
Tomas Måsgard

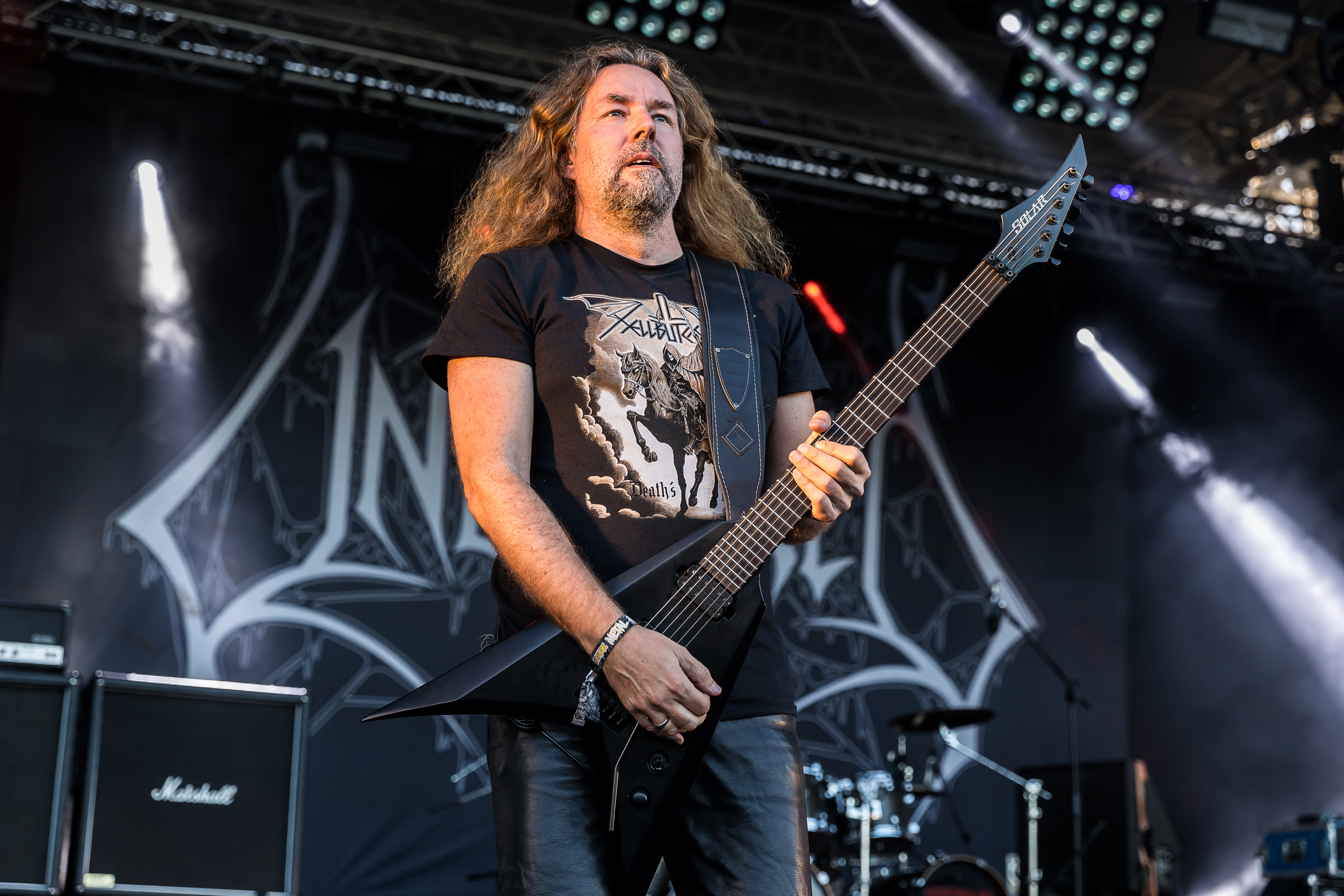
Fredrik Folkare

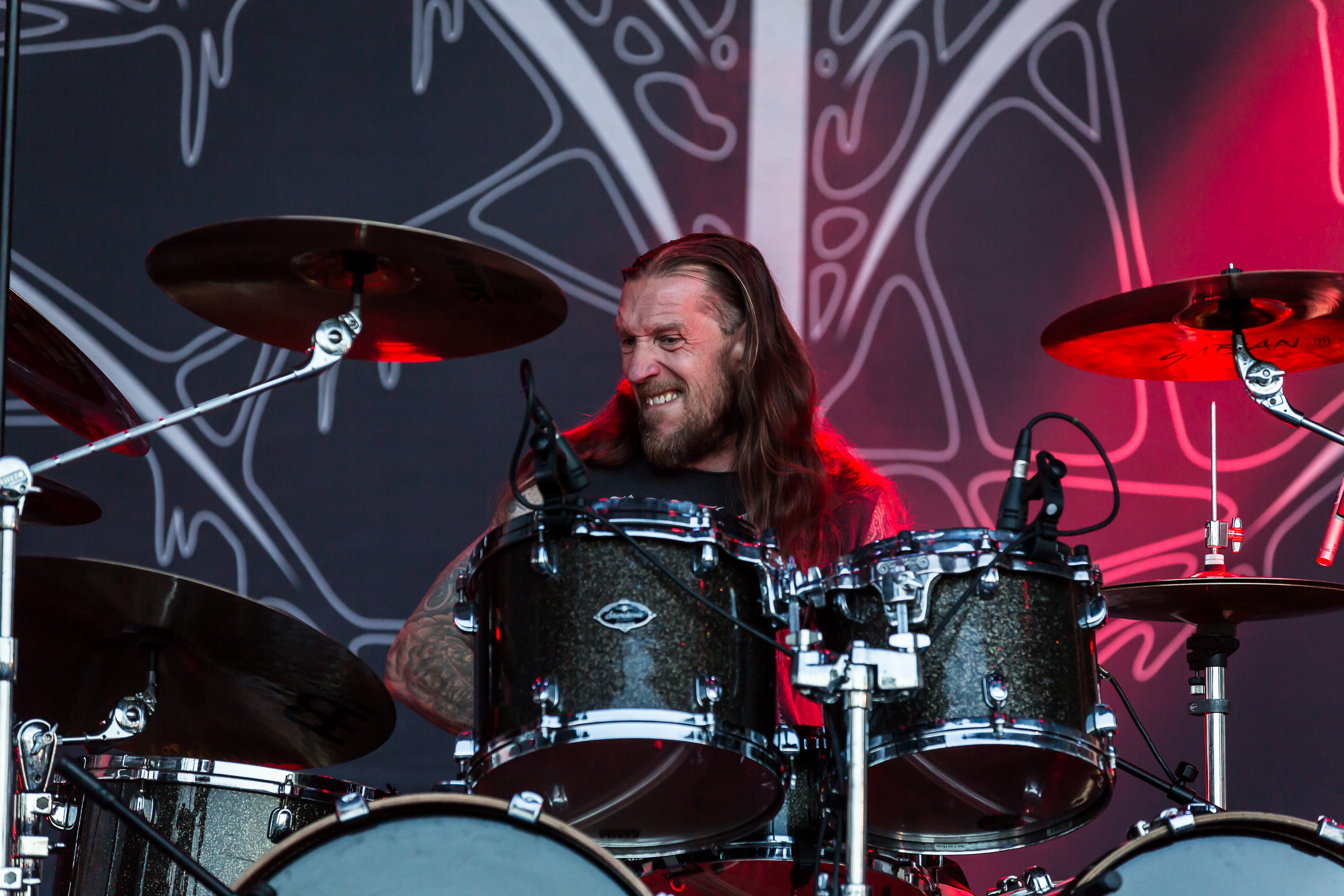
Anders Schultz

=== Current ===
- Johnny Hedlund – vocals, bass (1989–present)
- Anders Schultz – drums (1989–present)
- Tomas Måsgard – rhythm guitar (1990–present)
- Fredrik Folkare – lead guitar (1995–present)

=== Former ===
- Fredrik Lindgren – lead guitar (1989–1995, died 2025)
- Robert Sennebäck – vocals, rhythm guitar (1989–1990)

== Discography ==
=== Studio albums ===
- Where No Life Dwells (1991)
- Shadows in the Deep (1992)
- Across the Open Sea (1993)
- Victory (1995)
- Warrior (1997)
- Hell's Unleashed (2002)
- Sworn Allegiance (2004)
- Midvinterblot (2006)
- Hammer Battalion (2008)
- As Yggdrasil Trembles (2010)
- Odalheim (2012)
- Dawn of the Nine (2015)
- The Hunt for White Christ (2018)
- No Sign of Life (2021)
- Fire Upon Your Lands (2025)

=== EPs and singles ===
- ...And the Laughter Has Died (1991)

=== Live albums ===
- Live in Vienna '93 (1993)
- Eastern Blood Hail to Poland (1996)

=== Compilation albums ===
- Masters of Brutality (Fnac Music, 1992)
- Viking Raids (The Best Of 1991-2004) (2008)

=== Boxed sets ===
- ...And We Shall Triumph in Victory (2003)
- Immortal Glory (The Complete Century Media Years) (2008)
