= List of Candlemass members =

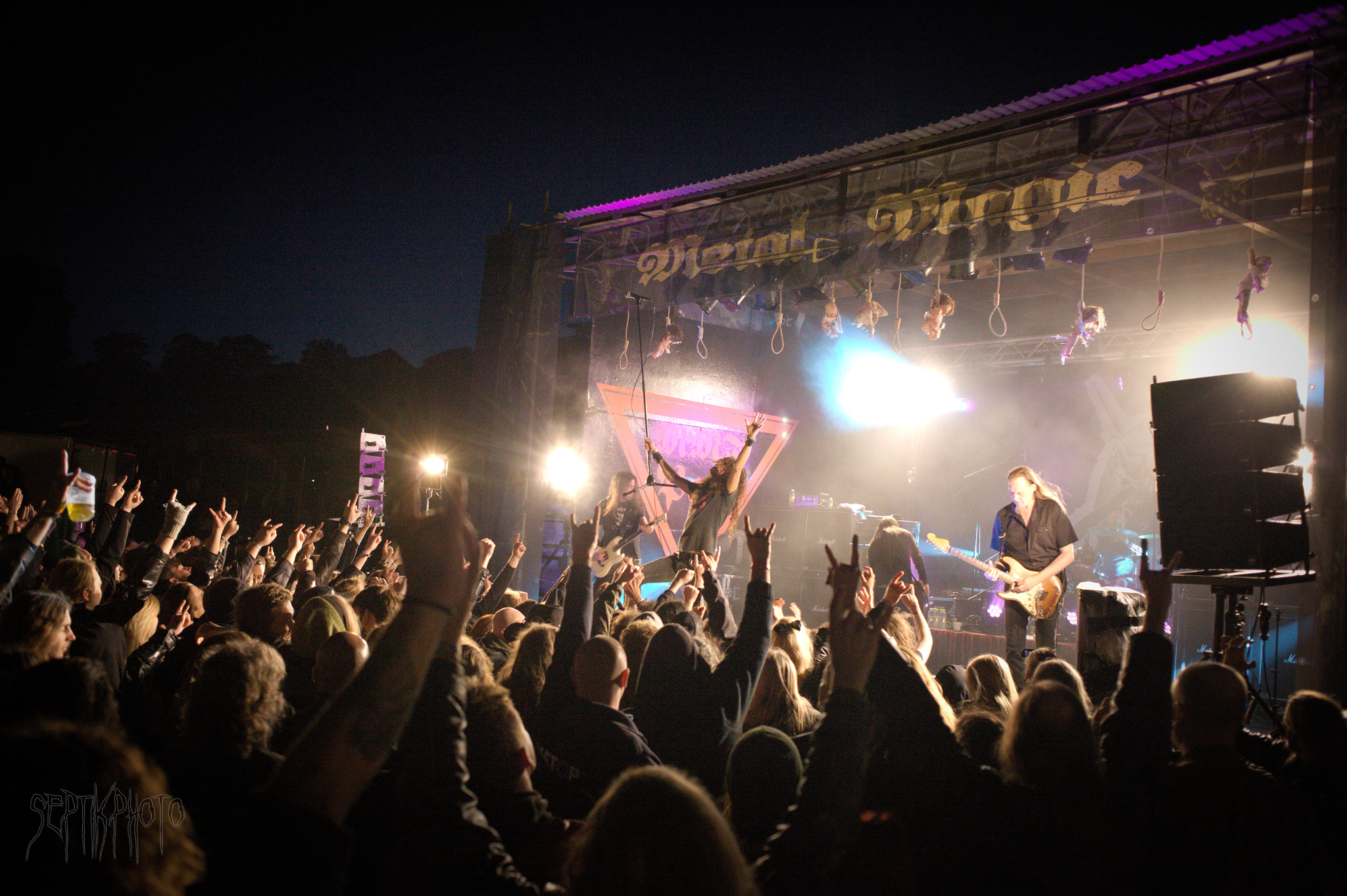
Candlemass performing live in 2015

Candlemass is a Swedish doom metal band from Stockholm. Formed in late 1984, the group originally consisted of bassist and vocalist Leif Edling, guitarist Mats "Mappe" Björkman, and drummer Matz Ekström. The group's current lineup includes Edling on bass, Björkman on rhythm guitar (a constant member, save for 1997–2001), vocalist Johan Längqvist (originally a member in 1986, and since 2018), drummer Jan Lindh, and lead guitarist Lars Johansson (both from 1986 to 1993 and since 2001).

== History ==
Leif Edling founded Candlemass in late 1984 after the breakup of his previous band Nemesis, completing the initial lineup with the addition of guitarist Mats "Mappe" Björkman and drummer Matz Ekström. After three demos in 1985 – the third of which featured lead guitarist Christian Weberyd – the band recorded its debut album Epicus Doomicus Metallicus in early 1986, with Johan Längqvist on vocals and Klas Bergwall on lead guitar. Both new members remained only for the recording of the album, after which they left again, followed shortly by Ekström. Langqvist, Bergwall and Ekström were replaced by Messiah Marcolin, Lars Johansson and Jan Lindh, respectively; just before the recording of 1987's Nightfall, however, Johansson broke his arm and was briefly replaced by Mike Wead, before returning to finish the album.

The lineup of Marcolin, Johansson, Björkman, Edling and Lindh released Ancient Dreams in 1988, Tales of Creation in 1989 and Live in 1990, before Marcolin left Candlemass prior to the recording of Chapter VI, reportedly after an argument with Edling. He was replaced for the album's recording and subsequent touring cycle by Thomas Vikström. The new lineup released Sjunger Sigge Fürst, before Edling disbanded the group in late 1993 ahead of forming Abstrakt Algebra. After releasing one album and recording a second which remained unreleased until 2006, Abstrakt Algebra were disbanded and replaced by a reformed Candlemass, who recorded Dactylis Glomerata with a new lineup composed of Edling alongside vocalist Björn Flodkvist, guitarist Michael Amott, drummer Jejo Perkovic and keyboardist Carl Westholm.

Just a few months after the release of Dactylis Glomerata, Amott was replaced by Mats Ståhl and the band recorded their seventh album, From the 13th Sun. By November 2001, following months of rumours, the 'classic lineup' of Candlemass had reunited, with Messiah Marcolin, Lars Johansson, Mappe Björkman and Jan Lindh all rejoining the group. After releasing Doomed for Live – Reunion 2002, the band reported in May 2004 that they had broken up again due to musical differences. Just six months later, however, they announced that they had reconsidered their decision to break up, and in 2005 released a self-titled studio album. Marcolin claimed in April 2006 that he had left Candlemass again, although he remained with the band until October, when he officially departed due to various ongoing issues.

Marcolin was replaced in January 2007 by Robert Lowe, best known as the frontman of Solitude Aeturnus. With their new lineup, Candlemass released King of the Grey Islands in 2007, Lucifer Rising in 2008 and Death Magic Doom in 2009. In December 2010 and April 2011, original vocalist Johan Längqvist performed with the band to mark the 25th anniversary of Epicus Doomicus Metallicus. Six days before the release of his third full-length album with the band, Psalms for the Dead, Lowe was dismissed from the group due to "the quality of the live performances". He was replaced by Mats Levén, who had previously performed with Edling in Abstrakt Algebra. Levén remained until September 2018, when Längqvist returned full-time for the first time in the band's history.

== Members ==
=== Current ===
Image	Name	Years active	Instruments	Release contributions
	Leif Edling	1984–1993; 1997–present	bass; vocals (1984–1986)	all Candlemass releases
	Mats "Mappe" Björkman	1984–1993; 2001–present	rhythm guitar; lead guitar (1984–1985)	all Candlemass releases from the Witchcraft demo (1985) to Sjunger Sigge Fürst (1993), and from Doomed for Live – Reunion 2002 (2003) onwards; Documents of Doom: Live at Fryshuset 1990 (2002)
	Johan Längqvist	1986 (session); 2010 (live); 2011 (live); 2018–present	vocals	Epicus Doomicus Metallicus (1986); 20 Year Anniversary Party (2007) – appears on five tracks; Epicus Doomicus Metallicus: Live at Roadburn 2011 (2013); all Candlemass releases from The Door to Doom (2019) onwards
	Jan Lindh	1986–1993; 2001–present	drums	all Candlemass releases from the untitled 1987 demo (1987) to Sjunger Sigge Fürst (1993), and from Doomed for Live – Reunion 2002 (2003) onwards
	Lars Johansson	1986–1993; 2001–present	lead guitar	all Candlemass releases from the untitled 1987 demo (1987) to Sjunger Sigge Fürst (1993), and from Doomed for Live – Reunion 2002 (2003) onwards

=== Former ===
Image	Name	Years active	Instruments	Release contributions
	Matz Ekström	1984–1986	drums	all Candlemass releases from the Witchcraft demo (1985) to Epicus Doomicus Metallicus (1986)
	Christian Weberyd	1985	lead guitar	Bewitched demo (1985); Epicus Doomicus Metallicus (1986)
	Klas Bergwall	1986	lead guitar	Epicus Doomicus Metallicus (1986)
	Messiah Marcolin	1986–1991; 2002–2006	vocals	all Candlemass releases from the untitled 1987 demo (1987) to Live (1990), and from Doomed for Live – Reunion 2002 (2003) to The Curse of Candlemass: Live in Stockholm 2003 (2005); Live at the Marquee 1988 (2013); "Dark Are the Veils of Death" (2017); Dynamo Doom (2019)
	Thomas Vikström	1991–1993	vocals	Chapter VI (1992); Sjunger Sigge Fürst (1993); 20 Year Anniversary Party (2007) – appears on six tracks
	Björn Flodkvist	1997–2001	vocals	Dactylis Glomerata (1998); From the 13th Sun (1999); "Nimis" (2001)
	Jejo Perkovic	1997–2001	drums	Dactylis Glomerata (1998); From the 13th Sun (1999); "Nimis" (2001)
	Carl Westholm	1997–1998 (later session)	keyboards	Dactylis Glomerata (1998); From the 13th Sun (1999) – appears on one track only; "Nimis" (2001); Candlemass (2005); King of the Grey Islands (2007); Psalms for the Dead (2012); Candlemass vs. Entombed (2013); The Door to Doom (2019) – appears on one track only; The Pendulum (2020) – appears on two tracks only; Sweet Evil Sun (2022)
	Michael Amott	1997–1998	guitar	Dactylis Glomerata (1998)
	Mats Ståhl	1998–2001	guitar	From the 13th Sun (1999); "Nimis" (2001)
	Robert Lowe	2007–2012	vocals	all Candlemass releases from King of the Grey Islands (2007) to Psalms for the Dead (2012)
	Mats Levén	2012–2018	vocals	20 Year Anniversary Party (2007) – appears on one track only; Psalms for the Dead (2012); Candlemass vs. Entombed (2013); Death Thy Lover (2016); House of Doom (2018); The Door to Doom (2019)

=== Session/Touring musicians ===
Image	Name	Years active	Instruments	Release contributions
	Mike Wead	1987	guitar; keyboards	Wead briefly replaced Johansson when the guitarist broke his arm during the recording of Nightfall (1987).
	Per Wiberg	2013–2019	keyboards; bass	Wiberg played keyboards with the band from 2013 to 2019, he also played bass when Edling was forced to sit out touring.
	Jörgen Sandström	2015–2019	bass	Sandström also played bass from 2015.

== Lineups ==
Period	Members	Releases
Late 1984 – late 1985	Leif Edling – vocals, bass; Mappe Björkman – guitar; Matz Ekström – drums	Witchcraft demo (1985); Studio Garage demo (1985)
Late 1985	Leif Edling – vocals, bass; Christian Weberyd – lead guitar; Mappe Björkman – rhythm guitar; Matz Ekström – drums	Bewitched demo (1985)
Early – mid-1986	Johan Längqvist – vocals; Klas Bergwall – lead guitar; Mappe Björkman – rhythm guitar; Leif Edling – bass; Matz Ekström – drums	Epicus Doomicus Metallicus (1986)
Late 1986 – summer 1987	Messiah Marcolin – vocals; Lars Johansson – lead guitar; Mappe Björkman – rhythm guitar; Leif Edling – bass; Jan Lindh – drums	untitled 1987 demo (1987)
Summer – autumn 1987 (temporary lineup)	Messiah Marcolin – vocals; Mike Wead – lead guitar, keyboards; Mappe Björkman – rhythm guitar; Leif Edling – bass; Jan Lindh – drums	Nightfall (1987) – select tracks; "Dark Are the Veils of Death" (2017)
Autumn 1987 – late 1991	Messiah Marcolin – vocals; Lars Johansson – lead guitar; Mappe Björkman – rhythm guitar; Leif Edling – bass; Jan Lindh – drums	Nightfall (1987); Ancient Dreams (1988); Tales of Creation (1989); 3-Way Thrash (1989); Live (1990); Live at the Marquee 1988 (2013); Dynamo Doom (2019)
Late 1991 – late 1993	Thomas Vikström – vocals; Lars Johansson – lead guitar; Mappe Björkman – rhythm guitar; Leif Edling – bass; Jan Lindh – drums	Chapter VI (1992); Sjunger Sigge Fürst (1993)
Band inactive late 1993 – summer 1997
Summer 1997 – spring 1998	Björn Flodkvist – vocals; Michael Amott – guitar; Leif Edling – bass; Jejo Perkovic – drums; Carl Westholm – keyboards	Dactylis Glomerata (1998)
Summer 1998 – November 2001	Björn Flodkvist – vocals; Mats Ståhl – guitar; Leif Edling – bass; Jejo Perkovic – drums	From the 13th Sun (1999); "Nimis" (2001)
November 2001 – October 2006	Messiah Marcolin – vocals; Lars Johansson – lead guitar; Mappe Björkman – rhythm guitar; Leif Edling – bass; Jan Lindh – drums	Doomed for Live – Reunion 2002 (2003); Essential Doom (2003) – one new track; Candlemass (2005); Live in Stockholm 2003 (2005)
January 2007 – June 2012	Robert Lowe – vocals; Lars Johansson – lead guitar; Mappe Björkman – rhythm guitar; Leif Edling – bass; Jan Lindh – drums	King of the Grey Islands (2007); 20 Year Anniversary Party (2007); Lucifer Rising (2008); Death Magic Doom (2009); Ashes to Ashes (2010); No Sleep 'til Athens (2010); "Don't Fear the Reaper" (2010); Psalms for the Dead (2012)
December 2010, April 2011 (temporary anniversary lineup)	Robert Lowe – vocals; Johan Längqvist – vocals; Lars Johansson – lead guitar; Mappe Björkman – rhythm guitar; Leif Edling – bass; Jan Lindh – drums	Epicus Doomicus Metallicus: Live at Roadburn 2011 (2013)
June 2012 – September 2018	Mats Levén – vocals; Lars Johansson – lead guitar; Mappe Björkman – rhythm guitar; Leif Edling – bass; Jan Lindh – drums	Candlemass vs. Entombed (2013); Death Thy Lover (2016); House of Doom (2018)
September 2018 – present	Johan Längqvist – vocals; Lars Johansson – lead guitar; Mappe Björkman – rhythm guitar; Leif Edling – bass; Jan Lindh – drums	The Door to Doom (2019); The Pendulum (2020); Green Valley Live (2021); Sweet Evil Sun (2022)
