= Doomology =

Studio album by Candlemass
- Released: 20 December 2010
- Recorded: 1987–2007
- Genre: Doom metal, epic doom metal
- Label: Nuclear Blast

Candlemass chronology
Death Magic Doom (2010)	Doomology (2010)

Doomology is a five-CD boxed set released by Swedish doom metal band Candlemass on 20 December 2010 on Nuclear Blast to celebrate their 25th anniversary. It contains two complete live concerts, including the band's first ever show, and three discs of demo recordings and unreleased tracks.

== Track listing ==
=== CD 1 – Jönköping 5/9 1987 ===
1. "Intro"
2. "Crystal Ball"
3. "Under The Oak"
4. "Bewitched"
5. "Demons Gate"
6. "The Well of Souls"
7. "A Sorcerer's Pledge"
8. "Solitude"

=== CD 2 – Buckley Tivoli 1988 ===
1. "Mirror Mirror"
2. "Bewitched"
3. "Solitude"
4. "The Bells of Acheron"
5. "At The Gallows End"
6. "Demons Gate"
7. "Bearer of Pain"
8. "Samarithan"
9. "A Cry From The Crypt"
10. "Dark Are The Veils of Death"
11. "The Well of Souls"
12. "A Sorcerer's Pledge"

=== CD 3 – Demos: White Album 2003–2004 ===
1. "Black Dwarf" (September 2004)
2. "Spellbreaker" (September 2004)
3. "Seven Silver Keys" (December 2004)
4. "Assassin of The Light" (December 2004)
5. "Copernicus" (December 2004)
6. "Witches" (August 2003)
7. "Born In A Tank" (August 2003)
8. "Black Dwarf" (Mats Levén vocals – May 2004)
9. "Spellbreaker" (Mats Levén vocals – May 2004)
10. "Witches" (Tony Martin vocals – October 2004)
11. "Witches" (Doogie White vocals – October 2004)

=== CD 4 – Demos: King of The Grey Islands (Mats Levén vocals) ===
1. "Emperor of The Void"
2. "Devil Seed"
3. "Of Stars And Smoke"
4. "Demonia 6"
5. "Man of Shadows"
6. "Embracing The Styx"
7. "Edgar Grey"

=== CD 5 – Misc Demos 1992–2007 ===
1. "Ebony Throne" (1992)
2. "The Dying Illusion" (1992)
3. "Temple of The Dead" (1992)
4. "The End of Pain" (1992)
5. "Black Dwarf" (2007 vocal auditions)
6. "At The Gallows End" (2007 vocal auditions)
7. "Solitude" (2007 vocal auditions)
8. "Lucifer Dance"
9. "Handklover Och Klarinett"
10. "Vårt Sista Avsked"

== Credits ==
- Leif Edling – bass guitar all tracks
- Lars Johansson – lead guitar all tracks
- Jan Lindh – drums all tracks
- Mats Björkman – rhythm guitar all tracks
- Messiah Marcolin – vocals CD1, CD2, CD3 tracks 1–7
- Mats Levén – vocals CD3 tracks 8–9, CD4
- Tony Martin – vocals CD3 track 10
- Doogie White – vocals CD3 track 11
- Johan Längqvist – vocals CD5 tracks 1–8
- Thomas Vikström – vocals CD5 tracks 9–10
- Rex Gisslén – keyboards CD5 track 10
