= Solitude (Candlemass song) =

Song by Candlemass

from the album Epicus Doomicus Metallicus
- Released: June 10, 1986; 39 years ago
- Recorded: February 1986
- Genre: Epic doom metal
- Length: 5:38
- Label: Black Dragon
- Songwriter: Leif Edling
- Producers: Ragne Wahlquist and Candlemass

"Solitude" is a song by Swedish doom metal band Candlemass. It is the opening track on the band's debut studio album, Epicus Doomicus Metallicus, released in June 1986. It is one of the band's signature songs, and has been a feature of all the band's live setlists since the release of the album.

== Composition and lyrics ==
The song was written by bassist and primary songwriter Leif Edling in 1985 along with the rest of the debut album. The guitar solo in the song, along with those on the rest of the album, is performed by session musician Klas Bergwall. The lyrics are written from the perspective of someone who suffers from severe depression and longs for death.

== Live and notable performances ==
The song is a live staple at Candlemass shows. In recent years, it has been used as the last song of the set. In 2007 and 2013 it was performed with former lead singer Johan Längqvist, and in 2011 it was performed along with the rest of Epicus Doomicus Metallicus at Roadburn Festival in the Netherlands for the live album Epicus Doomicus Metallicus - Live at Roadburn 2011. It has appeared on the live albums Live, Doomed for Live, No Sleep 'til Athens and Ashes to Ashes: Live.

== Personnel ==
- Johan Längqvist – vocals
- Klas Bergwall – lead guitar
- Mats Björkman – rhythm guitar
- Leif Edling – bass
- Mats Ekström – drums
