= The Best of Candlemass: As It Is, as It Was =

Compilation album by Candlemass
- Released: 10 October 1994
- Recorded: 1986–1992
- Genre: Epic doom metal
- Length: 131:51
- Label: Music for Nations

Candlemass chronology
Chapter VI (1993)	The Best of Candlemass: As It Is, as It Was (1994)	Dactylis Glomerata (1998)

Professional ratings
Review scores
Source	Rating
Rock Hard	(mixed)

The Best of Candlemass: As It Is, as It Was is a compilation album by Swedish doom metal band Candlemass. It consists of tracks from the first five studio albums, a live album and a couple of EPs. This compilation was released after their "unofficial" break up.

== Track listings ==
All songs by Leif Edling, except "The End of Pain" by Edling/Lars Johansson.

Disc one

1. "Solitude" – 5:36
2. "Bewitched" – 6:39
3. "Dying Illusion" – 5:49
4. "Demons Gate" – 9:11
5. "Mirror Mirror" (live) – 5:30
6. "Samarithan" – 5:29
7. "Into the Unfanthomed Tower" – 3:04
8. "Bearer of Pain" – 7:24
9. "Where the Runes Still Speak" – 8:39
10. "At the Gallows End" – 5:46
11. "Mourner's Lament" – 6:08

Disc two

1. "A Tale of Creation" – 6:54
2. "Ebony Throne" – 4:23
3. "Under the Oak" – 6:00
4. "Well of Souls" (live) – 5:23
5. "Dark Are the Veils of Death" – 4:04
6. "Darkness in Paradise" – 6:48
7. "The End of Pain" – 4:23
8. "Sorcerer's Pledge" – 10:13
9. "Solitude" (12" version) – 5:47
10. "Crystal Ball" (12" Version) – 5:27
11. "Bullfest" (93 Swedish Party Single) – 3:14
