= Candlemas (disambiguation) =

Candlemas or Candlemass is the Christian feast of the Presentation of Jesus at the Temple.

Candlemas or Candlemass may also refer to:

- Candlemass (band), a Swedish doom metal band
  - Candlemass (album), 2005
- Candlemas Islands, a group of sub-Antarctic Islands
  - Candlemas Island, the main island of that group
- Candlemas Massacre, an incident in King William's War, in 1692
- Candlemas Day (Scotland), a term day in the legal year
