= Chapter VI (album) =

Studio album by Candlemass
- Released: 25 May 1992
- Studio: Montezuma Recording, Stockholm, Sweden
- Genre: Epic doom metal
- Length: 46:28
- Label: Music for Nations
- Producer: Rex Gisslén, Leif Edling

Candlemass chronology
Live (1990)	Chapter VI (1992)	Dactylis Glomerata (1998)

Professional ratings
Review scores
Source	Rating
AllMusic	2/5 stars
Rock Hard	9.0/10

Chapter VI is the fifth studio album by Swedish doom metal band Candlemass, released on 25 May 1992 by Music For Nations.

It was the first Candlemass album not to feature Messiah Marcolin on vocals since 1986's Epicus Doomicus Metallicus. On this one, Thomas Vikström took his place. After poor sales of the album, Candlemass subsequently disbanded in early 1994, only to reform three years later.

== Track listing ==
All tracks are written by Leif Edling, except where noted.

No.	Title	Writer(s)	Length
1.	"The Dying Illusion"		5:52
2.	"Julie Laughs No More"	Leif Edling, Lars Johansson	4:23
3.	"Where the Runes Still Speak"		8:42
4.	"The Ebony Throne"		4:25
5.	"Temple of the Dead"		7:11
6.	"Aftermath"		5:37
7.	"Black Eyes"		5:53
8.	"The End of Pain"	Edling, Johansson	4:23
Total length:			46:28

== Personnel ==
Candlemass

- Thomas Vikström – vocals
- Lars Johansson – lead guitar
- Mats Björkman – rhythm guitar
- Leif Edling – bass guitar, producer
- Jan Lindh – drums

Production

- Rex Gisslén – producer, engineer, mixing
- Tomas Arfert – artwork

== Charts ==
Year	Chart	Position
1992	Swedish Albums Chart	43
