= Robert Lowe (singer) =

American heavy metal singer

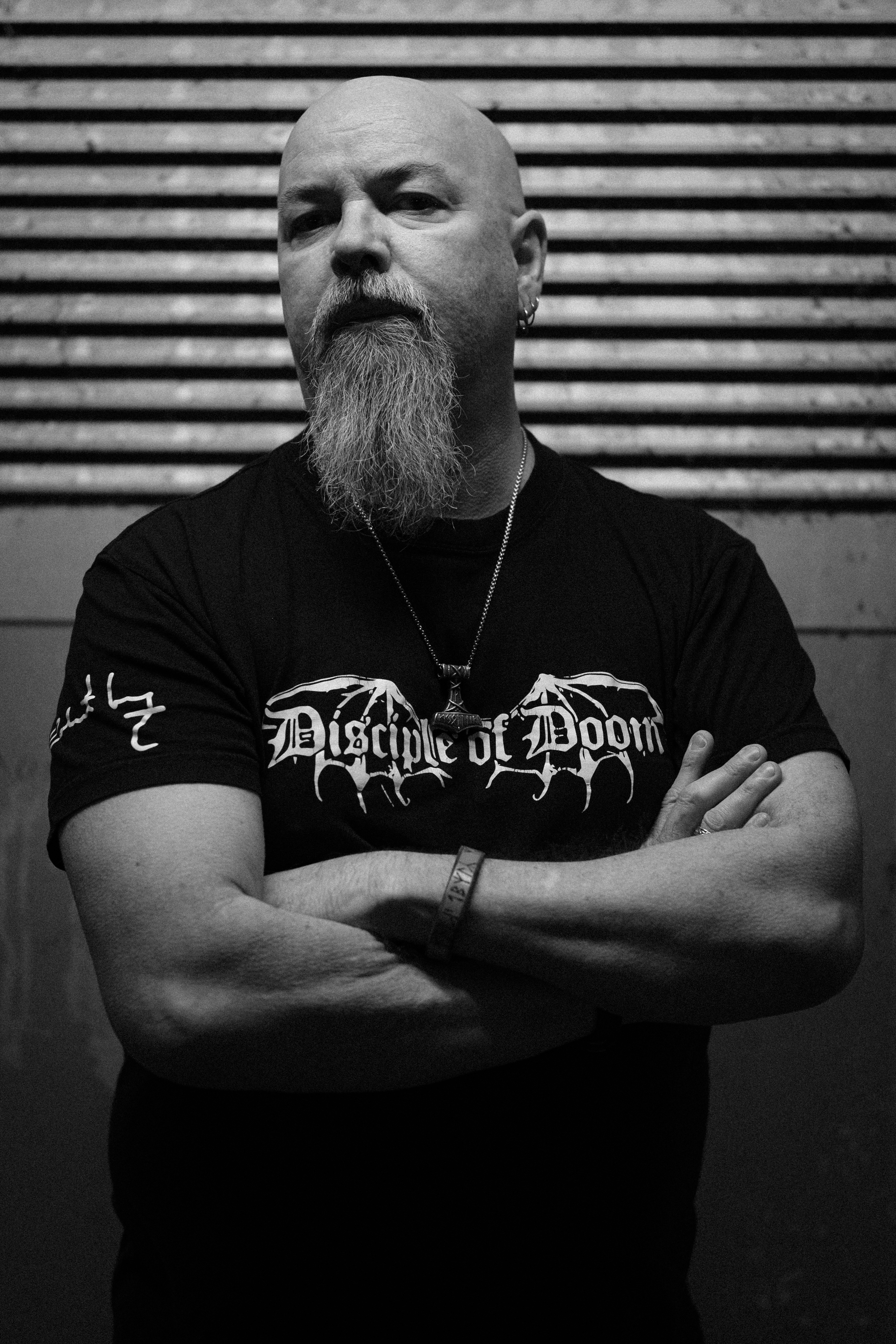
- Robert Lowe in 2026

Background information
- Genres: Epic doom metal; heavy metal
- Occupations: Singer; songwriter
- Years active: 1988–present
- Member of: Disciple of Doom
- Formerly of: Candlemass; Solitude Aeturnus; Tyrant; Grief Collector; Concept of God; Last Chapter

Robert Lowe is an American singer, songwriter, and multi‑instrumentalist, best known as the former vocalist of the doom metal bands Solitude Aeturnus and Candlemass.

== Career ==
=== Solitude Aeturnus ===
Lowe was brought into the band Solitude Aeturnus by his friend Lyle Steadham in 1988, replacing Kris Gabehardt. He is also the main lyricist on later albums. Lowe also appeared as a session singer on the first album of the band Last Chapter. In 1996, he sings on the debut album by trio out of Arlington, Texas: Liquid Sound Company: "Exploring the Psychedelic".

=== Candlemass ===
In January 2007, Leif Edling announced Lowe to be the main vocalist for the band Candlemass, and he recorded the albums King of the Grey Islands (2007), Death Magic Doom (2009), and Psalms for the Dead (2012). He also appeared on EP Lucifer Rising (2008). He was the band's longest-serving vocalist after Messiah Marcolin. In June 2012, Lowe left Candlemass.

=== Guest Work and Collaborations ===
He played bass in two shows with rock band Muthalode.

In 2007, Lowe recorded and released an album with a side project called Concept of God, including fellow former Solitude Aeturnus members. The album was titled Visions and was released by Massacre Records.

A press release dated May 2012 announced Lowe's recruitment for session vocals on the Wagnerian Opera Metal project Lyraka's upcoming album.

In September 2017, he joined the American heavy metal/doom metal band Tyrant.

In April 2019, Grief Collector from Minnesota released their debut album From Dissension to Avowal with Lowe on vocals. In February 2022, the band announced that they had "parted ways" with Lowe.

Lowe was recruited in May 2020 to record vocals for ex-Lyraka composer Andy DiGelsomina's solo album in 2020

=== Disciple of Doom ===
As of 2026, Lowe performs material from his time in Solitude Aeturnus and Candlemass with Brazilian musicians Bruno Luiz (guitar), Fabio Carito (bass), and Rodrigo Abelha (drums). The group performs under the name Disciple of Doom.

== Discography ==
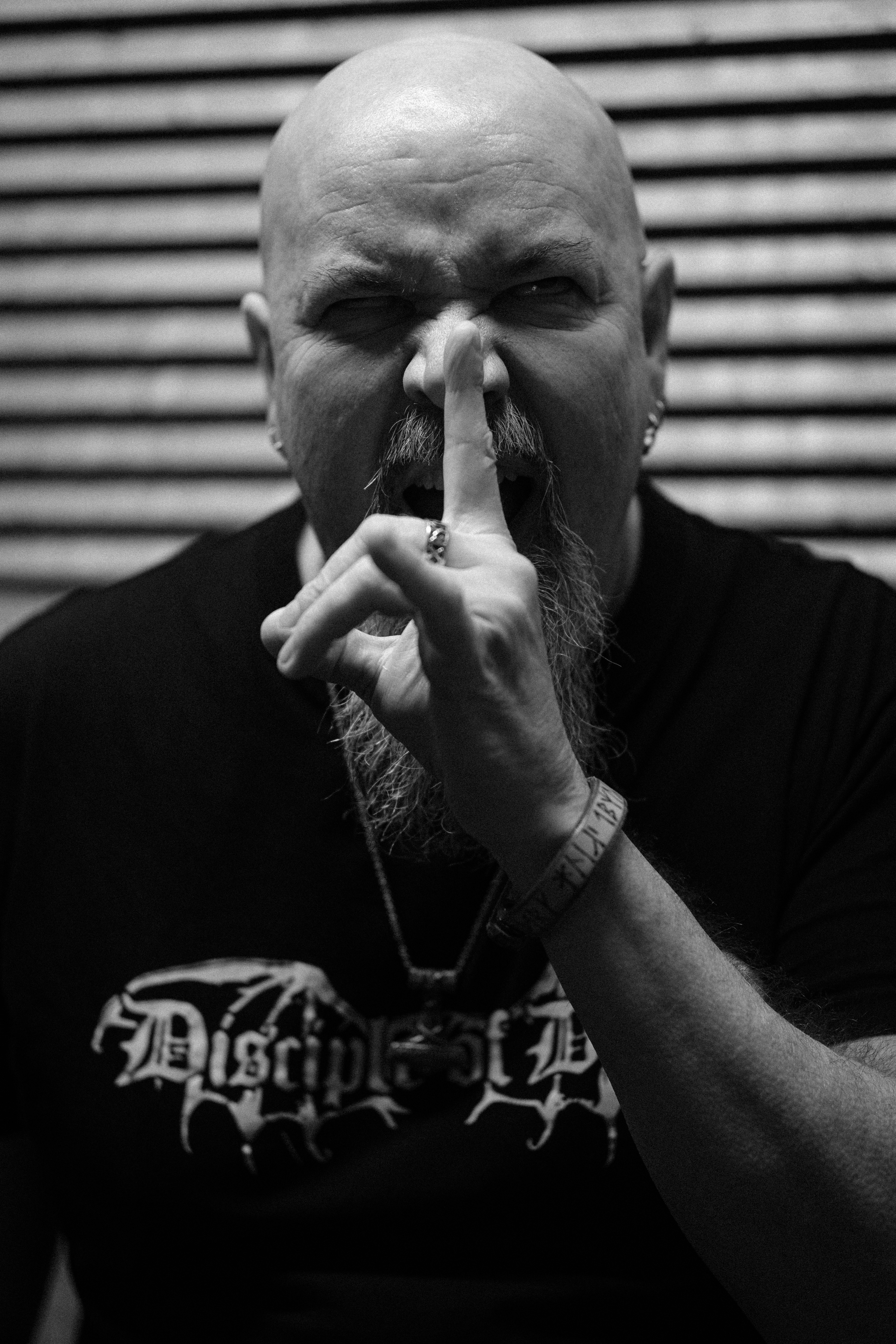
Photoshoot January 2025

=== With Solitude Aeturnus ===
- Into the Depths of Sorrow (1991)
- Beyond the Crimson Horizon (1992)
- Through the Darkest Hour (1994)
- Days of Doom (VHS, 1994)
- Downfall (1996)
- Adagio (1998)
- Alone (2006)
- Hour of Despair (DVD, 2007)

=== With Last Chapter ===
- The Living Waters (1997)

=== With Concept of God ===
- Visions (2007)

=== With Candlemass ===
- King of the Grey Islands (2007)
- Candlemass 20 Year Anniversary (DVD, 2007)
- Lucifer Rising (EP, 2008)
- Death Magic Doom (2009)
- Ashes to Ashes (live CD/DVD, 2010)
- Psalms for the Dead (2012)

=== With Grief Collector ===
- From Dissension to Avowal (2019)
- En Delirium (2021)

=== With Tyrant ===
- Hereafter (2020)

=== With DiGelsomina ===
- Sic Itur Ad Astra (TBA)

== Current Bands ==
- Disciple of Doom

== Past bands ==
- Solitude Aeternus (1988-2026)
- Tyrant (2017-2022)
- Grief Collector (2019-2022)
- Gathered in Darkness (2015-2016)
- Candlemass (2006-2012)
- Muthaldode (2008)
- Kegfish (2005)
- Concept of God (1999-2007)
- Last Chapter (1995-1998)
- Graven Image (1986-1988/1989)
- The Holy (1983-1985)

== External Sites ==
Instagram - Official Page
