= Marcolin (surname) =

Marcolin is a surname. Notable people with this surname include:

- Dario Marcolin (b. 1971), Italian football coach and former football player
- Bror Jan Alfredo Marcolin, also known as Messiah Marcolin (b. 1967), vocalist of the doom metal band Candlemass
