= Tales of Creation =

Studio album by Candlemass
- Released: 25 September 1989
- Recorded: June–July 1989
- Studio: Stockholm Recording, Stockholm, Sweden
- Genre: Epic doom metal
- Length: 42:43
- Label: Music for Nations (UK): Enigma; Metal Blade (US)
- Producer: Candlemass; Mats Lindfors

Candlemass chronology
Ancient Dreams (1988)	Tales of Creation (1989)	Live (1990)

Professional ratings
Review scores
Source	Rating
AllMusic	2.5/5 stars
Collector's Guide to Heavy Metal	7/10
Rock Hard	9.0/10

Tales of Creation is the fourth studio album by Swedish doom metal band Candlemass released on 25 September 1989. It was reissued in 2001 with a bonus CD.

Some of the material from this album ("Dark Reflections", "Under the Oak", "Into the Unfathomed Tower", "Somewhere in Nowhere" and "A Tale of Creation") was originally recorded in 1985 by one of the earliest incarnations of Candlemass. "Under the Oak" is actually a remake of a song from their 1986 debut Epicus Doomicus Metallicus. The cover art is a modified version of Gustave Doré's "The Creation of Light."

Tales of Creation was also the last Candlemass album to feature vocalist Messiah Marcolin until he returned for the self-titled album in 2005.

== Track listing ==
All tracks are written by Leif Edling

No.	Title	Length
1.	"The Prophecy"	1:27
2.	"Dark Reflections"	5:06
3.	"Voices in the Wind"	0:14
4.	"Under the Oak (New Version)"	6:00
5.	"Tears"	4:13
6.	"Into the Unfathomed Tower"	3:04
7.	"The Edge of Heaven"	6:25
8.	"Somewhere in Nowhere"	3:47
9.	"Through the Infinitive Halls of Death"	5:07
10.	"Dawn"	0:25
11.	"A Tale of Creation"	6:55
Total length:		42:43

Remastered CD version bonus tracks
No.	Title	Length
1.	"Dark Reflections" (demo)	3:21
2.	"Under the Oak" (demo)	7:44
3.	"Into the Unfathomed Tower" (demo)	3:10
4.	"Somewhere in Nowhere" (demo)	4:37
5.	"A Tale of Creation" (demo)	5:55
6.	"Interview"	19:29
7.	"Dark Reflections" (video)

== Personnel ==
Candlemass

- Messiah Marcolin - vocals
- Lars "Lasse" Johansson - lead guitars
- Mats "Mappe" Björkman - rhythm guitars
- Leif Edling - bass
- Jan Lindh - drums

Additional musicians

- Jim Bachman - narration
- Jay Larssen - narration

Production

- Mats Lindfors - producer, mixing
- Micke Mårtensson - artwork, layout

== Charts ==
Year	Chart	Position
1989	Swedish Albums Chart	48
