= Abstrakt Algebra =

Swedish metal band

Abstrakt Algebra was a Swedish experimental metal band with influences from power metal and doom metal. It was founded by bassist Leif Edling in 1994, shortly after his main project Candlemass split up.

They made one album, but Edling had already started working on a second album with a different line-up. However, due to the commercial failure of Abstrakt Algebra, Edling reformed Candlemass while taking with him some of the ideas for that second album, as well as drummer Jejo Perkovic. There, materialised on the Dactylis Glomerata album. And as such Abstrakt Algebra was over. That second album, called Abstrakt Algebra II, was later included as a bonus disc in the 2006 re-release of Dactylis Glomerata.

Mats Levén later appeared as the singer of the band Krux, another band by Edling, which has a similar take on the experimentation Edling started with Abstrakt Algebra.

== Members ==
Last line-up

- Mats Levén – vocals
- Patrik Instedt – guitar
- Leif Edling – bass
- Jejo Perkovic – drums
- Carl Westholm – keyboards

Former members

- Mike Wead – guitar
- Simon Johansson – guitar

== Discography ==
- Abstrakt Algebra (1995)
- Abstrakt Algebra II (2006)
