= Ancient Dreams =

Studio album by Candlemass
- Released: 23 November 1988
- Recorded: August 1988
- Studio: Nacka Recording House, Stockholm, Sweden
- Genre: Epic doom metal
- Length: 58:31
- Label: Active; Enigma; Metal Blade
- Producer: Candlemass

Candlemass chronology
Nightfall (1987)	Ancient Dreams (1988)	Tales of Creation (1989)

Professional ratings
Review scores
Source	Rating
AllMusic	3/5 stars
Collector's Guide to Heavy Metal	9/10
Rock Hard	9.0/10

Ancient Dreams is the third studio album by Swedish doom metal band Candlemass, released in 1988 and reissued in 2001 by Powerline Records with a bonus CD. The cover art of the album is a painting made by Thomas Cole, second in his series, "The Voyage of Life", entitled "Youth". Ancient Dreams was the first Candlemass album to chart in the US, debuting at No. 174 on the Billboard 200 album chart.

"Epistle 81" (Märk hur vår skugga), was written by Swedish poet/musician Carl Michael Bellman (1740 – 1795). "Incarnation of Evil" is actually a reworked version of the old Nemesis track "Black Messiah."

The band were not happy with the album's sound mix for which they blamed their then record label. The band felt that the album production had been rushed in order to have the LP released in time for their US tour.

== Track listing ==
All tracks are written by Leif Edling except where noted

No.	Title	Length
1.	"Mirror Mirror"	6:15
2.	"A Cry from the Crypt"	7:24
3.	"Darkness in Paradise"	6:46
4.	"Incarnation of Evil"	7:19
5.	"Bearer of Pain"	7:23
6.	"Ancient Dreams"	7:04
7.	"The Bells of Acheron"	5:21
8.	"Epistle No. 81" (Carl Michael Bellman, arr. Edling)	4:37
9.	"Black Sabbath Medley" (Ozzy Osbourne, Tony Iommi, Geezer Butler, Bill Ward)	6:14
Total length:		58:31

- The track "Black Sabbath Medley" is a CD bonus track and is composed of parts of songs from Black Sabbath, namely: "Symptom of the Universe", "Sweet Leaf", "Sabbath Bloody Sabbath", "Into the Void", "Electric Funeral", "Supernaut", "Black Sabbath".

Remastered CD Version bonus tracks
No.	Title	Length
1.	"Mirror Mirror" (live)	5:20
2.	"The Bells of Acheron" (live)	5:01
3.	"Bearer of Pain" (live)	6:12
4.	"A Cry from the Crypt" (live)	3:36
5.	"Interview"	23:51

== Personnel ==
Candlemass

- Messiah Marcolin – vocals
- Lars Johansson – lead guitar
- Mats Björkman – rhythm guitar
- Leif Edling – bass
- Jan Lindh – drums

Production

- Rex Gisslén – mixing at Montezuma Studios, Stockholm
- Peter Dahl – mastering at Polar Studios, Stockholm
- Wendy Kramer – artwork, graphics
- Micke Lind – remastering
- Micke Mårtensson – artwork, layout
- Ulf Magnusson – photography

== Charts ==
Year	Chart	Position
1989	Swedish Albums Chart	45
1989	Billboard 200 (US)	174
