= Hexenhaus =

Swedish metal band

Hexenhaus is a Swedish technical thrash metal band. They released four albums, three of them on Active Records.

== History ==
The band was formed in Stockholm in 1987. The lineup mostly consisted of members of the former speed metal band Maninnya Blade, spearheaded by guitarist Mike Wead. After the first album, only Wead remained, welcoming four new members. For their third album, the band had yet another new singer as well as a new bass player.

The first three albums were originally released by Active Records, then re-released by Greek label Rock of Angels Records in 2025.

After the dissolution of Hexenhaus, band members formed Memento Mori.

== Discography ==
- A Tribute to Insanity (1988)
- The Edge of Eternity (1990)
- Awakening (1991)
- Dejavoodoo (1997)
