= The Door to Doom =

Studio album by Candlemass
- Released: 22 February 2019
- Recorded: 2018
- Studio: Deep Well Studios (Stockholm, Sweden); The Brick HitHouse (Stockholm, Sweden)
- Genre: Epic doom metal
- Length: 48:43
- Label: Napalm
- Producer: Marcus Jidell

Candlemass chronology
Psalms for the Dead (2012)	The Door to Doom (2019)	Sweet Evil Sun (2022)

The Door to Doom is the twelfth studio album by Swedish doom metal band Candlemass, released on 22 February 2019 via Napalm. It is the band's first full-length studio album since 2012's Psalms for the Dead, marking their longest gap between studio albums, and the first one to feature vocalist Johan Längqvist since 1986's Epicus Doomicus Metallicus. Loudwire named it one of the 50 best metal albums of 2019.

== Track listing ==
All tracks are written by Leif Edling.

No.	Title	Length
1.	"Splendor Demon Majesty"	5:29
2.	"Under the Ocean"	6:12
3.	"Astorolus - The Great Octopus" (featuring Tony Iommi)	6:42
4.	"Bridge of the Blind"	3:43
5.	"Death's Wheel"	6:50
6.	"Black Trinity"	6:05
7.	"House of Doom"	6:26
8.	"The Omega Circle"	7:16
Total length:		48:43

Japanese edition bonus tracks (House of Doom EP)
No.	Title	Length
9.	"House of Doom" (original version)	6:21
10.	"Flowers of Deception"	6:10
11.	"Fortune Teller"	3:12
12.	"Dolls on the Wall"	3:55
Total length:		19:38

== Personnel ==
Candlemass

- Johan Längqvist – vocals
- Mats "Mappe" Björkman – rhythm guitar
- Lars Johansson – lead guitar
- Leif Edling – bass
- Jan Lindh – drums

Additional musicians

- Tony Iommi – guitar solo (track 3)
- Jennie-Ann Smith – backing vocals
- Mats Levén – backing vocals
- Stefan Berggren – backing vocals
- Rickard Nilsson – keyboards (tracks 1, 3, 4)
- Carl Westholm – Mellotron (track 4)
- Andreas "Habo" Johansson – outro drums (track 8)
- Michael Blair – percussion

Production and design

- Marcus Jidell − production, recording
- Niklas Flyckt − mixing
- Svante Forsbäck − mastering
- Erik Rovanperä − artwork
- Beatrice Edling − layout
- Kinan Faham − photography

== Charts ==
Chart (2019)	Peak position
Austrian Albums (Ö3 Austria)	54
Belgian Albums (Ultratop Flanders)	87
Belgian Albums (Ultratop Wallonia)	182
German Albums (Offizielle Top 100)	18
Scottish Albums (OCC)	69
Swedish Albums (Sverigetopplistan)	13
Swiss Albums (Schweizer Hitparade)	29
