= Live (Candlemass album) =

Live album by Candlemass
- Released: 3 October 1990
- Recorded: 9 June 1990
- Venues: Fryshuset, Stockholm, Sweden
- Genre: Epic doom metal
- Length: 75:46 (CD); 81:25 (2-LP)
- Labels: Music for Nations (UK); Metal Blade (US)
- Producers: Leif Edling and Mats Lindfors

Candlemass chronology
Tales of Creation (1989)	Live (1990)	Chapter VI (1992)

Professional ratings
Review scores
Source	Rating
AllMusic	3/5 stars
Collector's Guide to Heavy Metal	7/10
Rock Hard	10.0/10

Live is the first live album by Swedish doom metal band Candlemass, released on 3 October 1990 through Music For Nations in the UK, and through Metal Blade Records in the US.

== Track listing ==
1. "The Well of Souls" - 5:23
2. "Dark Are the Veils of Death" - 4:02
3. "Bewitched" - 4:29
4. "Solitude" - 5:43
5. "Dark Reflections" - 4:44
6. "Under the Oak" - 5:58
7. "Demons Gate" - 8:52
8. "Bells of Acheron" - 5:26
9. "Crystal Ball" - 5:25 (on the 2-LP version only)
10. "Through the Infinitive Halls of Death" - 5:26
11. "Samarithan" - 5:11
12. "Mirror Mirror" - 5:32
13. "At the Gallows End" - 5:30
14. "A Sorcerer's Pledge" 10:13

== 2008 reissue ==
Disc one
Live in Stockholm 09-06-1990

1. "The Well of Souls"
2. "Dark Are the Veils of Death"
3. "Bewitched"
4. "Solitude"
5. "Dark Reflections"
6. "Under the Oak"
7. "Demons Gate"
8. "Bells of Acheron"
9. "Through the Infinitive Halls of Death"
10. "Samarithan"
11. "Mirror Mirror"
12. "At the Gallows End"
13. "A Sorcerer's Pledge"

Disc two
Live at the Dynamo Open Air '88

1. "Solitude"
2. "At the Gallows End"
3. "Crystal Ball"
4. "Dark Are the Veils of Death"
5. "A Sorcerer's Pledge"
6. "Black Sabbath medley"
7. "Crystal Ball" (live Fryshuset '90 LP version)
8. "Bearer of Pain" (live Fryshuset '90 mixing desk bonus track)

== Personnel ==
Candlemass

- Messiah Marcolin - vocals
- Mats Björkman - rhythm guitar
- Lars Johansson - lead guitar
- Leif Edling - bass guitar
- Jan Lindh - drums

Production

- Mats Lindfors - producer, engineer, mixing (1990 Live)
