= King of the Grey Islands =

Studio album by Candlemass
- Released: 22 June 2007
- Recorded: May and August 2006; March 2007 (vocals)
- Studio: Polar Studios, Stockholm; Nomad Studios, Dallas, Texas (vocals)
- Genre: Epic doom metal
- Length: 53:55 (original); 65:15 (digipak version)
- Label: Nuclear Blast
- Producer: Leif Edling and Candlemass

Candlemass chronology
Candlemass (2005)	King of the Grey Islands (2007)	Lucifer Rising (2008)

Professional ratings
Review scores
Source	Rating
AllMusic	3/5 stars
Blabbermouth.net	7.5/10
Chronicles of Chaos	9/10
Exclaim!	(favourable)
Rock Hard	9/10

King of the Grey Islands is the ninth studio album by Swedish doom metal band Candlemass, released on 22 June 2007 through Nuclear Blast Records. It is the first album recorded following the departure of vocalist Messiah Marcolin, who left the band during the pre-production phase of the album. He was replaced by Robert Lowe, who would stay with the band until his departure in June 2012.

A digipak version contains two bonus studio session tracks with Robert Lowe. The album was also released as a double vinyl LP with the bonus track "Edgar Grey". A tin box set edition (limited to 500 copies) was also released, which included a bonus 3" CD with two bonus tracks: "Black Dwarf" and "Demonia 6 (early version)". "Black Dwarf" is a re-recording with Lowe on vocals. These songs also appear on the "Black Dwarf" 7".

Upon its release, the album was met with widespread acclaim from both critics and fans.

== Track listing ==
All tracks are written by Leif Edling

No.	Title	Length
1.	"Prologue"	0:56
2.	"Emperor of the Void"	4:29
3.	"Devil Seed"	5:44
4.	"Of Stars and Smoke"	5:38
5.	"Demonia 6"	6:23
6.	"Destroyer"	7:52
7.	"Man of Shadows"	6:17
8.	"Clearsight"	6:52
9.	"The Opal City"	1:13
10.	"Embracing the Styx"	8:19
Total length:		53:55

Digipak edition bonus tracks
No.	Title	Length
11.	"Solitude"	5:58
12.	"At the Gallows End"	5:22
Total length:		65:15

== Personnel ==
Candlemass

- Robert Lowe – vocals
- Mats Björkman – rhythm guitar
- Lars Johansson – lead guitar
- Leif Edling – bass, producer
- Jan Lindh – drums

Additional musicians

- Carl Westholm – keyboards

Production

- Chris Laney – engineer, post-production fixes
- Andreas Osslund – engineering on track 4
- Peter Tägtgren – mixing at The Abyss in March 2007
- Sören von Malmborg – mastering
- Tomas Arfert – cover design and illustration

== Charts ==
Year	Chart	Position
2007	Swedish Albums Chart	32
2007	German Albums Chart	83
