= Memory Garden =

Swedish metal band

- Origin: Sweden
- Genres: Doom metal, heavy metal, power metal
- Years active: 1992–present
- Label: Vic Records

Memory Garden is a doom metal and heavy metal band from Kumla, Sweden. They were signed to Metal Blade Records until 2002, moved to Vic Records in 2006 and in 2012 returned to metal Blade to record Doomain (2013).

== History ==
The band was formed in December 1992, got signed by the small Swedish label Heathendoom Music, and released Forever EP (1995) and debut full-length Tides (1996), both recorded at Fredman Studios by producer Fredrik Norman. In 1996, joined by guitarist Simon Johansson (ex-Fifth Reason, Abstract Algebra) they were signed by Metal Blade Records and in 1998 released Verdict of Posterity, recorded at the XTC Studios with producer Mike Wead (King Diamond, Mercyful Fate and others).

Following the Scandinavian tour and the appearance at the Wacken Open Air in summer of 1999, Memory Garden in February 2000 recorded Mirage (again with Wead) and supported the album by a host of European shows. Having left Metal Blade in 2002, they remained in touch with Wead who helped them record Carnage Carnival, released in 2008 through Vic Records. The release was followed by numerous festivals around Europe.

In September 2007 bassist Ken Johansson had to quit because of lack of time. The band then found a replacement in young Johan Fredriksson. In late October 2008, shortly after the release of Carnage Carnival, longtime rhythm guitarist and main lyricist Anders Looström left the band because of "personal priorities." Ante Mäkelä was recruited to replace Looström.

In June 2011 Memory Garden started working upon their fifth album in their Kumla studio. Mixed by Dan Swanö at Unisound Studios, Doomain was released in 2013 via Metal Blade Records, to generally positive reviews.

In 2021 Memory Garden released their sixth full-length album "1349", a concept album about "black death" the bubonic plague pandemic of 1349. The album was released by Greek Record label No Remorse Records.

The band is said to have taken their name from the Trouble song "Memory's Garden".

== Members ==
- Stefan Berglund – vocals (1992–present)
- Ante Mäkelä – guitars (2008-)
- Simon Johansson – lead guitar (1996–present)
- Johan Wängdahl – bass (2007–present)
- Tom Björn – drums (1992–present)

=== Former members ===
- Anders Looström – guitars (1992–2008)
- Ken Johansson – bass (1992–2007)
- Rick Gustafsson – guitar (1994–1996)
- Nico Henningsson – guitar/keyboards (1992–1993)

== Discography ==
- Tides (1996, re-released in 2009)
- Verdict of Posterity (1999)
- Mirage (2000)
- Carnage Carnival (2008)
- Doomain (2013)
- 1349 (2021)

=== EPs and singles ===
- Blessed Are the Dead (1994)
- Forever (1995, re-released in 2007)
- Ta någon hårt i hand, så ger vi oss av till tomteland (1995)
- Marion (2004)
