= Sweet Evil Sun =

Studio album by Candlemass
- Released: 18 November 2022
- Studio: Nox Studios (Jakobsberg, Sweden)
- Genre: Doom metal
- Length: 53:50
- Label: Napalm
- Producer: Marcus Jidell

Candlemass chronology
| The Door to Doom (2019) | Sweet Evil Sun (2022) |

Professional ratings
Review scores
| Source | Rating |
|---|---|
| Blabbermouth.net | 8/10 |
| Distorted Sound | 7/10 |
| Metal Hammer | 3/5 stars |
| MetalSucks | 4/5 |
| RockHard | 9/10 |

Sweet Evil Sun is the thirteenth studio album by Swedish doom metal band Candlemass. It was released on 18 November 2022 through Napalm Records. Recording sessions took place at Nox Studios in Jakobsberg. Production was handled by Marcus Jidell.

The album debuted at number 52 in Sweden, number 37 in Switzerland and number 42 in Germany. It also made it to number 19 on the UK Rock & Metal Albums and number 44 on the UK Independent Albums.

== Track listing ==
All tracks are written by Leif Edling.

| No. | Title | Length |
|---|---|---|
| 1. | "Wizard of the Vortex" | 6:02 |
| 2. | "Sweet Evil Sun" | 3:40 |
| 3. | "Angel Battle" | 6:29 |
| 4. | "Black Butterfly" | 5:46 |
| 5. | "When Death Sighs" | 5:59 |
| 6. | "Scandinavian Gods" | 4:36 |
| 7. | "Devil Voodoo" | 7:36 |
| 8. | "Crucified" | 6:23 |
| 9. | "Goddess" | 6:07 |
| 10. | "A Cup of Coffin" (Outro) | 1:12 |
| Total length: | | 53:50 |

== Personnel ==
- Johan Langquist – vocals
- Mats "Mappe" Björkman – guitar
- Lars Johansson – solo guitar
- Leif Edling – songwriter, bass
- Jan Lindh – drums
- Carl Westholm – keyboards
- Stefan Nykvist – back-up vocals
- Kenneth Anger – narrator (track 3)
- Jennie-Ann Smith – chorus vocals (track 5)
- Rickard Nilsson – additional keyboards
- Marcus Jidell – producer, recording
- Ronny Lahti – mixing
- Patrick W. Engel – mastering
- Erik Rovanperä – cover artwork
- Linda Åkerberg – photography
- Johan Wallgren – artwork
- Beatrice Edling – layout

== Charts ==
| Chart (2022) | Peak position |
|---|---|
| German Albums (Offizielle Top 100) | 42 |
| Swedish Albums (Sverigetopplistan) | 52 |
| Swiss Albums (Schweizer Hitparade) | 37 |
| UK Rock & Metal Albums (OCC) | 19 |
| UK Independent Albums (OCC) | 44 |
