= Krux =

Swedish doom metal band

- Origin: Sweden
- Genres: Doom metal
- Years active: 2002–present
- Labels: GMR Music
- Members: Leif Edling; Mats Levén; Peter Stjärnvind; Jörgen Sandström; Fredrik Åkesson; Carl Westholm

Krux is a Swedish doom metal band formed by Leif Edling after Candlemass fell apart for the second time preceding their reunion tour.

The band's formation was announced in March 2002, with the involvement of Entombed members Peter Stjärnvind (drums) and Jörgen Sandström (guitar), Arch Enemy and Spiritual Beggars guitarist Michael Amott and former Red Fun vocalist Tomas Person. With rough demos being recorded at Mikael Åkerfeldt home studio. It was later announced the Amott and Person would only be appearing as guests.

Former Yngwie Malmsteen vocalist Mats Levén was announced as a member of the project in June 2002, alongside the inclusion of lead guitarists Nico Elgstrand and Fredrik Åkesson. A live gig at Kägelbanan in Stockholm, Sweden for May 18 was announced in April 2003.

== Members ==
- Leif Edling – bass (since 2002)
- Mats Levén – vocals (since 2002)
- Peter Stjärnvind – drums (since 2002)
- Jörgen Sandström – guitars (since 2002)
- Fredrik Åkesson – guitars (since 2002)
- Carl Westholm – keyboards (since 2002)

== Discography ==
- Krux (2002)
- Krux: Live (DVD, 2003)
- II (2006)
- III: He Who Sleeps Amongst the Stars (2011)
