= Psalms for the Dead =

Studio album by Candlemass
- Released: 8 June 2012
- Recorded: December 2011
- Studios: B.A.M. Studios, Stockholm, Sweden
- Genre: Epic doom metal
- Length: 50:13
- Label: Napalm
- Producer: Leif Edling

Candlemass chronology
Death Magic Doom (2010)	Psalms for the Dead (2012)	The Door to Doom (2019)

Professional ratings
Review scores
Source	Rating
About.com	4/5 stars
AllMusic	3/5 stars
Brave Words & Bloody Knuckles	7.5/10
Metal Hammer (GER)	6/7
Metal Rules	3.0/5
The Phoenix	3/4 stars
Rock Hard	8.0/10
Sputnikmusic	3.5/5

Psalms for the Dead is the eleventh studio album by Swedish doom metal band Candlemass, released on 8 June 2012. At the time of its release, the band stated that this would be their final album, though bassist and founding member Leif Edling has since retracted this claim. Psalms for the Dead is, however, the last Candlemass album recorded with singer Robert Lowe, who left the band just six days before its release.

The album would become Candlemass' last full-length release in over half a decade, until the 2019 release of their twelfth studio album The Door to Doom; during those seven years, however, the band released two EPs featuring new material: Death Thy Lover (2016) and House of Doom (2018).

== Track listing ==
All tracks are written by Leif Edling.

No.	Title	Length
1.	"Prophet"	6:05
2.	"The Sound of Dying Demons"	5:30
3.	"Dancing in the Temple (of the Mad Queen Bee)"	3:38
4.	"Waterwitch"	7:03
5.	"The Lights of Thebe"	5:49
6.	"Psalms for the Dead"	5:15
7.	"The Killing of the Sun"	4:09
8.	"Siren Song"	5:57
9.	"Black as Time"	6:47
Total length:		50:13

== Personnel ==
Candlemass

- Robert Lowe - vocals
- Mats Björkman - rhythm guitar
- Lars Johansson - lead guitars
- Leif Edling - bass, producer
- Jan Lindh - drums

Additional musicians

- Carl Westholm - keyboards
- Mark Robertson - backing vocals

Production

- Andreas Bauman - engineer
- Chris Laney - engineer, mixing
- Sören von Malmborg - mastering
- Erik Rovanperä - cover art
- Tomas Arfert - additional graphics

== Charts ==
Year	Chart	Position
2012	Swedish Albums Chart	19
2012	German Albums Chart	58
