= Doomed for Live – Reunion 2002 =

Live album by Candlemass
- Released: 2003
- Recorded: 31 August 2002 by SR P3
- Venue: Klubben, Stockholm, Sweden
- Genre: Epic doom metal
- Length: 97:07
- Label: Powerline
- Producer: Nenne Zetterberg, Leif Edling

Candlemass chronology
From the 13th Sun (1999)	Doomed for Live – Reunion 2002 (2003)	Candlemass (2005)

Professional ratings
Review scores
Source	Rating
Rock Hard	(favourable)

Doomed for Live – Reunion 2002 is the second live album by Swedish doom metal band Candlemass, released in 2003 through Powerline Records. It was recorded at Stockholm's Klubben on 31 August 2002.

== Track listing ==
=== Disc one ===
All songs by Leif Edling

1. "Mirror Mirror" – 5:51
2. "Bewitched" – 4:33
3. "Dark Are the Veils of Death" – 4:04
4. "Demons Gate" – 9:23
5. "Under the Oak" – 6:17
6. "At the Gallows End" – 5:33
7. "Samarithan" – 5:15
8. "Dark Reflections" – 4:43
9. "Mourner's Lament" – 4:46
10. "Black Stone Wielder" – 2:54

=== Disc two ===
1. "The Well of Souls" – 8:53
2. "A Sorcerer's Pledge" – 10:24
3. "Bearer of Pain" – 4:26
4. "Ancient Dreams" – 0:30
5. "Somewhere in Nowhere" – 4:32
6. "Solitude" – 7:39
7. "Crystal Ball" – 7:22

== Personnel ==
Candlemass

- Messiah Marcolin - vocals
- Lars Johansson - lead guitar
- Mats Björkman - rhythm guitar
- Leif Edling - bass guitar, producer, mixing
- Jan Lindh - drums

Production

- Nenne Zetterberg - producer
- Staffan Schöijer, Ulf Östling - engineers
- Johan Östling - assistant engineer
- Uffe Östling - mixing
- Janne Waldenmark, Pontus Norgren - ProTools fixes
- Micke Lind - mastering
