= Nightfall (Candlemass album) =

Studio album by Candlemass
- Released: 9 November 1987
- Recorded: July–September 1987
- Studios: Thunderload Studios, Stockholm
- Genre: Epic doom metal
- Length: 46:29
- Label: Axis
- Producer: Candlemass

Candlemass chronology
Epicus Doomicus Metallicus (1986)	Nightfall (1987)	Ancient Dreams (1988)

Singles from Nightfall
- 1. "Samarithan" Released: 28 March 1988 (UK); 2. "At the Gallows End" Released: 1988 (US)

Nightfall is the second studio album by Swedish doom metal band Candlemass, released on 9 November 1987 through Axis Records. After being dropped from the label Black Dragon Records, Candlemass were the first band signed to Axis. The group had a new line-up from their previous album including vocalist Messiah Marcolin, whose decisions became instrumental during the production and release stages of the album.

Two singles were released from Nightfall: "Samarithan" and "At the Gallows End". A music video was directed for the song "Bewitched" by Jonas Åkerlund. The album has been re-released in various formats and was followed up by Ancient Dreams in 1988.

== Production ==
After being dropped from Black Dragon Records due to the disappointing sales of their previous album Epicus Doomicus Metallicus (1986), Candlemass became the first band signed to David Constable's British label Axis Records. Constable had decided to sign the band after being impressed with their demo tape for "Bewitched".

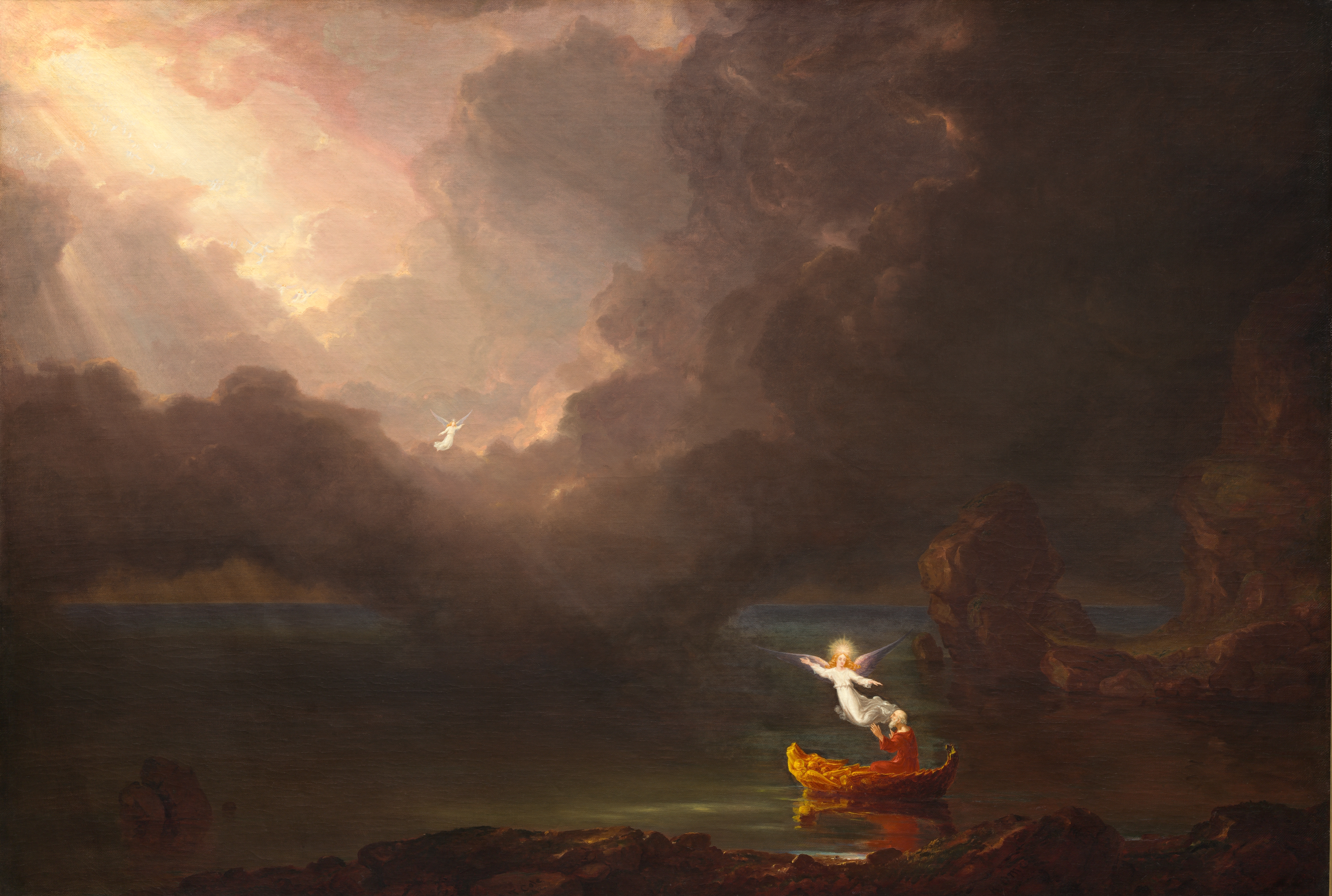
The album art uses Thomas Cole's painting "Old Age" from The Voyage of Life.

The group's line-up had changed since their previous studio recording. Jan Lindh had replaced drummer Mats Ekström who had left the group because he could not find enough time for rehearsals. Lead guitarist Lars Johansson had also joined the band. During a tour in 1987 with King Diamond, Johansson broke his arm and was temporarily replaced by guitarist Mike Wead. The final new band member was vocalist Messiah Marcolin, who phoned Leif Edling to sing an a cappella version of "Solitude" as an audition.

Like the previous album, Nightfall was recorded at Thunderload Studios in Stockholm with Ragne Wahlquist as engineer. Wead's brief membership in Candlemass lead to him allegedly recording rhythm guitar, harmony and acoustic guitars and keyboards on the album, although the only thing that is confirmed by the band as his is the recording of his song "Black Candles". Marcolin's influence was strong and included the recording of the song "Marche Funèbre" on his suggestion, the band's choice of the album cover based on Thomas Cole's paintings "The Voyage of Life", and the title Nightfall, rejecting Edling's original title for the album Gothic Stone. The song "Samarithan" was originally written during the recording sessions for Epicus Doomicus Metallicus, but was rejected by former group member Mats Ekström.

After completing the sessions at Thunderload, which lasted from July to September 1987, the recordings were mixed by Mats Lindfors at Stockholm Recording Studio.

== Release ==
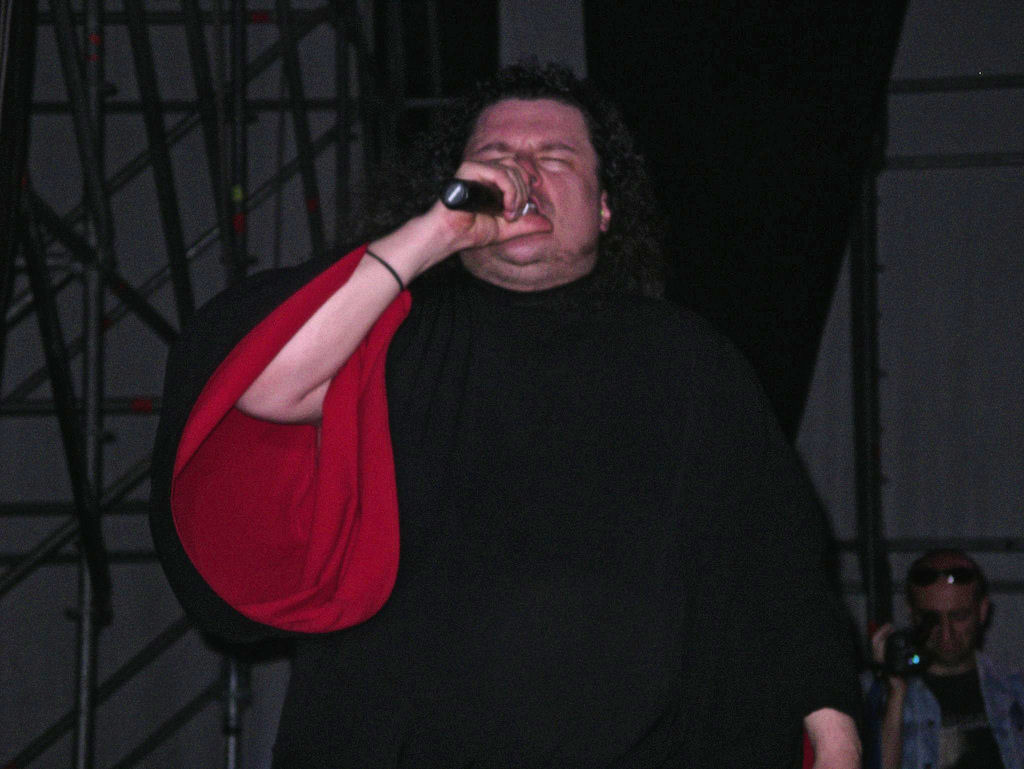
New vocalist Messiah Marcolin came up with the album's title.

Nightfall was released on 9 November 1987 by Axis Records on vinyl and CD. In 1988, the album was released in the USA by Metal Blade Records. Two singles were released from Nightfall in 1987. The first was for "Samaraithan" which was released on both 7-inch and 12-inch vinyl. Music for Nations and Metal Blade Records released "At the Gallows End" as a 12-inch single in 1988.

A music video was directed by Jonas Åkerlund for the song "Bewitched" in 1988. "Bewitched" was the first music video by Åkerlund, who was previously a member of the Swedish black metal group Bathory. Åkerlund would go on to make music videos for other Swedish bands like Whale and Roxette, as well as international musicians such as Metallica, U2 and Lady Gaga. The video also featured an appearance from future Mayhem vocalist Pelle "Dead" Ohlin.

In the 2000s, the album was re-released in Sweden by Powerline Records, including demo tracks, live versions of songs and a music video for the song "Bewitched". In 2007, the album was re-issued by Peaceville Records with similar bonus tracks.

== Reception ==
Professional ratings
Review scores
Source	Rating
AllMusic	4.5/5 stars
Collector's Guide to Heavy Metal	8/10
Metal Forces	9.9/10
Metal Storm	9.5/10
Rock Hard	8.5/10

Like the band's debut album, Nightfall was met with universal acclaim by both music critics and fans. In a contemporary review, Metal Forces editor Bernard Doe called the album "an essential buy for any true metal fan" and lauded Candlemass for mixing "some early Black Sabbath (circa Master of Reality), some early Rainbow (circa Rising) and some Metallica", and adding "plenty of their own original style to produce a unique sound." Rock Hard reviewed positively the album, but recognized that the "sluggish" rhythms and Marcolin's "clean and high voice" could not please everyone.

In a modern review, Metal Storm staff writer remarked the progress made by the band from their debut album in making "more complex and atmosphere/emotion-evoking" music and called Nightfall a "masterpiece." AllMusic's Eduardo Rivadavia review compared the album favorably to the group's previous work, stating that it "managed to break even more new ground by introducing the operatic bellowing of new vocalist Messiah Marcolin, whose religious lyrics found the perfect match in the slow, grinding power chords written by bassist Leif Edling." He found the work "cohesive", despite Candlemass "can't resist thrashing out just a tad" on the songs "At the Gallow's End" and "Dark Are the Veils of Death" Canadian critic Martin Popoff wrote that Nightfall sounds very similar to Candlemass' debut album and its style is a mix of "the slowest portions from Tony Iommi's first five years riffs", Trouble's "sleepiest moments" and St. Vitus' "downer ideas". He added that "a few uptempo ideas would have helped" to raise his score.

== Track listings ==
All tracks are written by Leif Edling, except where noted.

Side one
No.	Title	Length
1.	"Gothic Stone" (instrumental)	0:48
2.	"The Well of Souls"	7:27
3.	"Codex Gigas" (instrumental)	2:20
4.	"At the Gallows End"	5:48
5.	"Samarithan"	5:30

Side two
No.	Title	Writer(s)	Length
6.	"Marche funèbre" (instrumental)	Frédéric Chopin	2:22
7.	"Dark Are the Veils of Death"		7:08
8.	"Mourners Lament"		6:10
9.	"Bewitched"		6:38
10.	"Black Candles" (instrumental)	Mike Wead	2:18

2000 CD edition bonus tracks
No.	Title	Length
1.	"Bewitched" (demo)	7:10
2.	"Battlecry" (demo)	6:08
3.	"The Well of Souls" (live)	5:16
4.	"Dark Are the Veils of Death" (live)	4:08
5.	"At the Gallows End" (studio outtake)	5:50
6.	"Mourners Lament" (studio outtake)	5:36
7.	"Interview"	24:21
8.	"Bewitched" (music video)	7:34

== Personnel ==
=== Candlemass ===
- Messiah Marcolin – vocals
- Lars Johansson – lead guitar
- Mats Björkman – rhythm guitar
- Leif Edling – bass
- Jan Lindh – drums

=== Additional musicians ===
- Mike Wead – rhythm guitar, acoustic guitar, keyboards

=== Production ===
- Candlemass – arranger, producer
- Ragne Wahlqvist – engineer
- Mats Lindfors – mixing
- Thomas Cole – cover art
