= From the 13th Sun =

Studio album by Candlemass
- Released: 6 September 1999
- Recorded: September 1998
- Studio: Slamtilt Studio and Swedish Broadcasting Corporation Studio 4, Stockholm, Sweden
- Genre: Epic doom metal
- Length: 48:01
- Label: Music for Nations
- Producer: Candlemass

Candlemass chronology
Dactylis Glomerata (1998)	From the 13th Sun (1999)	Doomed for Live – Reunion 2002 (2002)

Professional ratings
Review scores
Source	Rating
AllMusic	3/5 stars
Collector's Guide to Heavy Metal	8/10
Rock Hard	8.0/10

From the 13th Sun is the seventh studio album by Swedish doom metal band Candlemass, released on 6 September 1999 through Music For Nations.

The CD liner notes say the album is "dedicated to the greatest band of all time: Black Sabbath".

== Track listing ==
All tracks are written by Leif Edling, except where noted

No.	Title	Writer(s)	Length
1.	"Droid"		4:35
2.	"Tot"		6:01
3.	"Elephant Star"		4:54
4.	"Blumma Apt"	Leif Edling, Björn Flodkvist	5:23
5.	"ARX/NG 891"	Edling, Carl Westholm	5:56
6.	"Zog"		5:52
7.	"Galatea"		4:49
8.	"Cyclo-F"		9:18
9.	"Mythos"	Mats Ståhl	1:13
Total length:			48:01

== Personnel ==
Candlemass

- Björn Flodkvist – vocals
- Mats Ståhl – lead & rhythm guitar
- Leif Edling – bass
- Jejo Perkovic – drums

Additional personnel

- Carl Westholm – synthesizers on ARX/NG 891

Production

- Arranged and produced by Candlemass
- Recorded and engineered by Candlemass and Bjorn Wallmark
- Mixed by Leif Edling, Uffe Östling and Carl Westholm
- Mastered by Michael Lind
- Cover design by Tomas Arfert
