= Dactylis Glomerata =

Studio album by Candlemass
- Released: 13 April 1998
- Recorded: 1996–1997
- Studio: Swedish Broadcasting Corporation Studio 4, Slamtilt Studio and Studio Montezuma (overdubs); Sunlight Studio (disc 2), Stockholm, Sweden
- Genre: Epic doom metal
- Length: 43:44
- Label: Music for Nations
- Producer: Leif Edling

Candlemass chronology
The Best of Candlemass: As It Is, as It Was (1994)	Dactylis Glomerata (1998)	From the 13th Sun (1999)

Dactylis Glomerata is the sixth studio album by Swedish doom metal band Candlemass, released on 13 April 1998 through Music For Nations. This was their first album released since their split in 1994.

The album was originally destined to be the second release by Candlemass main songwriter Leif Edling's side-project Abstrakt Algebra but, under request from the record label Music for Nations, it was converted into a Candlemass album. There were many musicians involved in the long process of recording, including members of the Abstrakt Algebra's line-up, guitarist Michael Amott of Arch Enemy and Carcass fame and new singer Björn Flodkvist.

The music on the album lacks much of the epic doom sound of previous works and embraces a more experimental and progressive approach, with elements of stoner rock and space rock.

In 2006, it was reissued by GMR Music as a 2 CD edition. The second disc contains the previously unreleased album Abstrakt Algebra II, from which this album's tracks derived.

== Background ==
Candlemass disbanded in 1994, after the release of the EP Sjunger Sigge Furst. Main songwriter and bassist Leif Edling formed a new band called Abstrakt Algebra with singer Mats Levén, drummer Jejo Perkovic, guitarists Mike Wead and Simon Johansson. Abstrakt Algebra released their eponymous debut album of experimental and progressive metal in 1995. The album received some good reviews but was not a commercial success.

== Composition and recording ==
Edling composed music for a second more progressive Abstrakt Algebra album and started recording it with a different line-up, which included keyboard player Carl Westholm and guitarist Patrik Instedt replacing Wead and Johansson, at Sunlight Studio, Stockholm, Sweden in the autumn of 1996. Soon problems emerged with the recording studio and the producer and Edling's finances dried up. Music for Nations, the British label which had issued the previous Candlemass albums, offered Edling to finance further recordings in a different studio if the album was released as a work by Candlemass. Edling, who was on the edge of bankruptcy and a mental breakdown, agreed to this condition and rearranged the songs to adapt them to the heavier doom metal sound of Candlemass. He also composed the new songs "I Still See the Black", "Molotov" and "Karthago" for the album.

His old bandmates declined Edling's request for collaboration, so he recruited Swedish guitarist Michael Amott, renowned for his work with Carcass, Spiritual Beggars and Arch Enemy and a declared Candlemass fan, to beef up the guitar sound on the tracks. Meanwhile, Levén had joined Yngwie Malmsteen's band and Björn Flodkvist, who Edling had met while working at Sveriges Radio P3 and coming from the Swedish alternative rock band Gone, was selected as singer.

A band composed by Edling, Amott, Flodkvist, Instedt, Perkovic and Westholm re-recorded during a weekend in May 1997 the basic tracks for the old Abstrakt Algebra songs and for the new compositions "I Still See the Black", "Karthago" and "Wiz" (originally called "Blue Wizard") with the help of session musicians at Swedish Broadcasting Corporation Studio 4 in Stockholm, Sweden. Those three days of recording were Amott's only involvement with Candlemass. Overdubs were added by several other musicians at two other studios of the same city. The final mix, performed by Edling and engineer Uffe Östling, joined the new recordings and more overdubs until after September 1997.

== Release ==
The album took about 18 months to be completed and was released on 13 April 1998 by Music for Nations. The Japanese edition featured the bonus tracks "Container" and "Thirst". The title comes from the plant Dactylis glomerata, the flower of which Edling is allergic to.

Dactylis Glomerata was reissued in 2006 in a 2 CD edition by the Swedish label GMR Music and by Peaceville Records in 2008. The second disc contains the Abstrakt Algebra sessions recorded by the band in 1996 and extensive liner notes by Edling.

== Reception ==
Professional ratings
Review scores
Source	Rating
Collector's Guide to Heavy Metal	7/10
Rock Hard	8.0/10

Dactylis Glomerata received positive reviews, but was a commercial failure. Canadian journalist Martin Popoff praised the "trippy, not cheesy" production and Björn Flodkvist's vocals, considering the album "closer to stoner rock than self-serious doom". Rock Hard reviewer remarked how different the sound of Dactylis Glomerata is in comparison with the "classic" first four Candlemass albums, lacking "their anthemic, epic arrangements", "the theatrical element, which has always characterized the vocals of Messiah" (Marcolin), and featuring elements of space rock in several tracks like the "monumental 'Dustflow'".

== Track listing ==
All tracks are written by Leif Edling.

No.	Title	Length
1.	"Wiz"	4:06
2.	"I Still See the Black"	6:19
3.	"Dustflow"	9:24
4.	"Cylinder" (instrumental)	1:23
5.	"Karthago"	6:38
6.	"Abstrakt Sun"	6:41
7.	"Apathy"	4:07
8.	"Lidocain God"	3:32
9.	"Molotov" (instrumental)	1:31

Japan Bonus Tracks/2006 Remastered edition bonus tracks
No.	Title	Length
10.	"Container"	3:19
11.	"Thirst"	4:54

2006 Remastered edition disc 2 – Abstrakt Algebra II
No.	Title	Length
1.	"3:rd Child from the Sun"	4:06
2.	"Dustflow"	7:59
3.	"Abstrakt Sun"	6:52
4.	"Thirst"	5:03
5.	"Bug Queen"	3:48
6.	"Blue Wizard"	4:20
7.	"Lidocain God"	4:15
8.	"Cylinder" (instrumental)	1:34
9.	"Enigma"	4:11

== Personnel ==
Candlemass

- Björn Flodkvist – vocals
- Leif Edling – bass, producer, mixing
- Michael Amott – guitar
- Carl Westholm – keyboards
- Jejo Perkovic – drums

Additional musicians

- Ian Haugland – drums on "Wiz" and "I Still See the Black"
- Ulf Edelönn – guitar on "I Still See the Black"
- Patrik Instedt – guitar on "Dustflow", "Abstrakt Sun" and "Lidocain God"
- Måns P. Månsson – Korg synthesizer and theremin on "Dustflow"
- Jan Hellman – distorted electric upright bass on "Karthago"
- Adam Axelsson – claypot and Hare Krishna stuff on "Apathy"

Abstrakt Algebra (on disc 2)

- Mats Levén – vocals
- Leif Edling – bass
- Patrik Instedt – guitar
- Carl Westholm – keyboards
- Jejo Perkovic – drums

Additional musicians (on disc 2)

- Sara Berg – female voice on "Bug Queen"
- Måns P. Månsson – Korg synthesizer and theremin on "Dustflow"
- Jörgen Cremonese – guitar overdubs on "Dustflow" and "Abstrakt Sun"

Production

- Uffe Östling – engineer, mixing
- Björn Wallmark, Rex Gisslén – overdubs engineers
- Jan Hellman – digital editing and overdubs
- Sören Elonsson – remastering
