= Lucifer Rising (Candlemass EP) =

EP by Candlemass
- Released: 6 October 2008
- Recorded: April 2008 (studio tracks); 30 September 2007 (live tracks)
- Venue: Gagarin 205, Athens (live tracks)
- Studios: Polar Studios, Stockholm (studio tracks)
- Genre: Epic doom metal
- Length: 71:38
- Label: Nuclear Blast

Candlemass chronology
King of the Grey Islands (2007)	Lucifer Rising (2008)	Death Magic Doom (2009)

Professional ratings
Review scores
Source	Rating
AllMusic	(favourable)
Brave Words & Bloody Knuckles	8/10
Rock Hard	(favourable)
Scream	4/6

Lucifer Rising is an expanded EP by Swedish doom metal band Candlemass, released in 2008 by Nuclear Blast Records. Candlemass recorded two new tracks, "Lucifer Rising" and "White God", and re-recorded "Demons Gate" for this release. The collection is also primarily composed of a series of 9 live tracks recorded in Athens, Greece on their 2007 tour (sides 2 to 4 on the vinyl edition). Recording on the new material was completed in April 2008. The title track, "Lucifer Rising", is included as a bonus song on the digipak edition of the full-length album Death Magic Doom, which was released six months after the EP.

== Track listing ==
All tracks are written by Leif Edling.

No.	Title	Length
1.	"Lucifer Rising"	4:06
2.	"White God"	5:01
3.	"Demons Gate"	9:03
4.	"At the Gallows End" (live)	5:17
5.	"Solitude" (live)	6:54
6.	"Emperor of the Void" (live)	4:53
7.	"Devil Seed" (live)	6:02
8.	"Mirror Mirror" (live)	6:04
9.	"Under the Oak" (live)	7:01
10.	"Of Stars and Smoke" (live)	5:51
11.	"Black Dwarf" (live)	5:30
12.	"Samarithan" (live)	5:52

== Personnel ==
Candlemass

- Robert Lowe – vocals
- Mats Björkman – rhythm guitar
- Lars Johansson – lead guitars
- Leif Edling – bass
- Jan Lindh – drums

Production

- Chris Laney – engineering, mixing
- Sören von Malmborg – mastering
- Tomas Arfert – artwork

== Charts ==
Chart (2008)	Peak position
Greek Albums Chart	31
