= Thomas Vikström =

Swedish singer

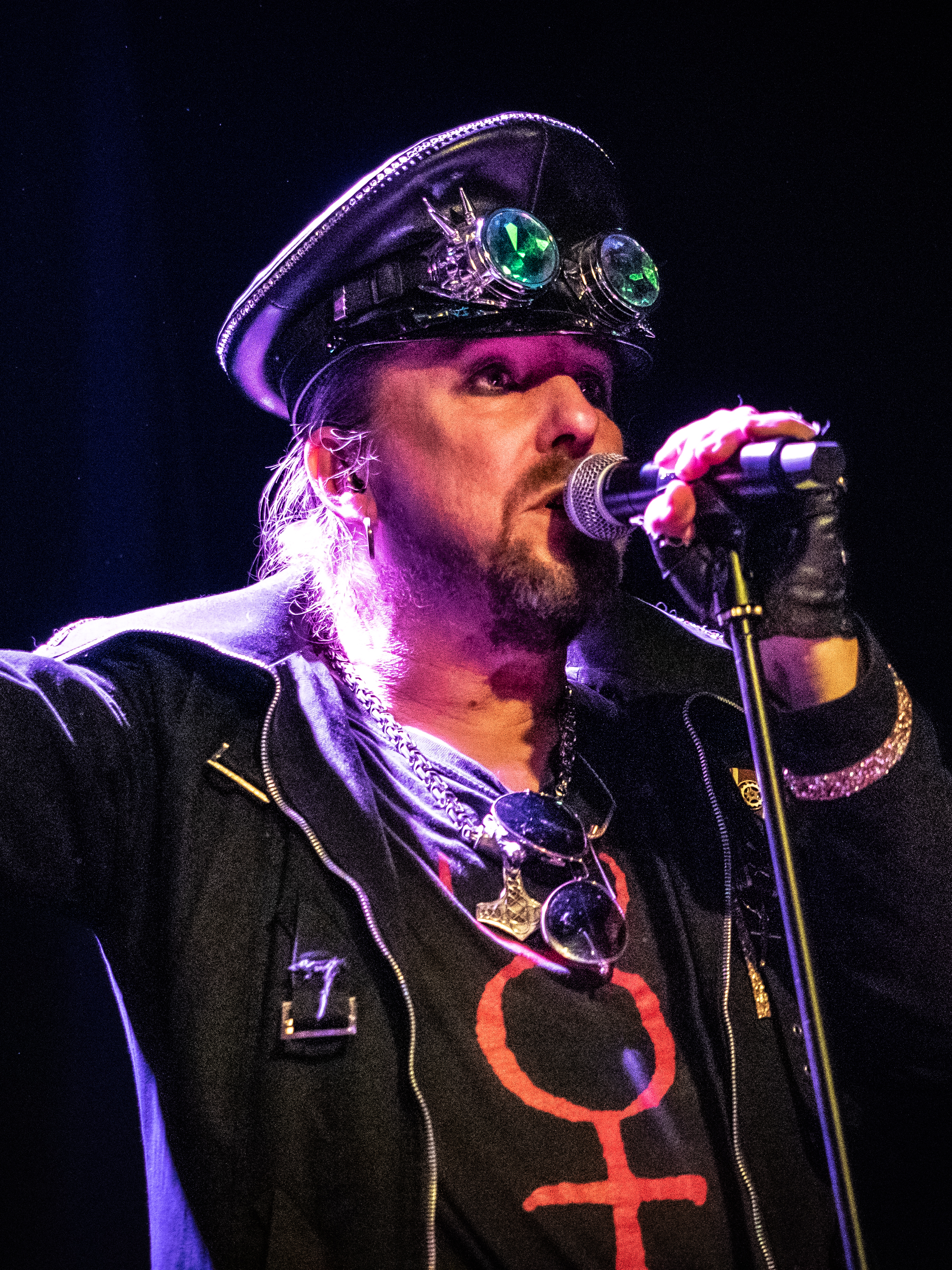
- Vikström with Therion in 2024

Background information
- Born: Sven Erik Herman Thomas Vikström; 21 January 1969 (age 57)
- Genres: Heavy metal, epic doom metal, power metal, symphonic metal, opera(tenor)
- Occupation: Singer
- Years active: 1988–present
- Member of: Therion
- Formerly of: Stormwind; Candlemass

Sven Erik Herman Thomas Vikström (born 21 January 1969) is a Swedish singer best known for working with hard rock and heavy metal bands including doom metal band Candlemass (during their initial final years, from 1991 to 1994) and power metallers Stormwind. He is the son of opera singer Sven-Erik Vikström. He is also a permanent vocalist for the symphonic metal band Therion.

== Musical theatre ==
Inspired by his father, Vikström has played roles in theatre productions starting on stage at the Stockholm theatre Folkan in 1990. During 1991 he starred as the main-character in the opera Hoffman's Adventure in Stockholm. He also played the main part as John in the musical Miss Saigon from late 1997 to December 1998.

== Discography ==
- Talk of the Town – Talk of the Town (1988)
- Candlemass – Chapter VI (1992)
- Candlemass – Sjunger Sigge Furst (EP, 1993)
- Thomas Vikström (solo) – If I Could Fly (1994)
- Brazen Abbot – Live and Learn (Vikström sings on three songs only, 1995)
- Brazen Abbot – Eye of the Storm (Vikström sings on two songs only, 1996)
- Brazen Abbot – Bad Religion (Vikström sings on three songs only, 1997)
- Stormwind – Heaven Can Wait (1999)
- Stormwind – Resurrection (2000)
- Stormwind – Reflections (2001)
- Stormwind – Rising Symphony (2003)
- Stormwind – Legacy (live) (2004)
- Silent Memorial – Cosmic Handball (Asian Release Only, 2004)
- Dark Illusion – For Just Another Night (EP, 2003)
- Dark Illusion – Beyond the Shadows (2005)
- Deacon Street – II (Vikström sings on three songs only, 2006)
- 7Days – The Weight of the World (2006)
- Mehida – Blood & Water (2007)
- Covered Call – Money Never Sleeps (2009)
- Enlighted – Time to Fly (2009)
- Dark Illusion – Where the Eagles Fly (2009)
- Steel Seal – Redemption Denied (2010)
- Therion – Sitra Ahra (2010)
- 7Days – Into Forever (2010)
- Therion – Les Fleurs du Mal (2012)
- Diabulus in Musica – Argia (male vocals on "Encounter at Chronos' Maze", 2014)
- Therion – Beloved Antichrist (2018)
- Legado de una Tragedia – El secreto de los Templarios (2019)
- Saurom – Mester de juglaría (2021)
- Legado de una Tragedia – Britania (2021)
- Therion – Leviathan (2021)
- Therion – Leviathan II (2022)
- Therion – Leviathan III (2023)
- Legado de una Tragedia – Aquelarre de Sombras (2023)
