= Mike Wead =

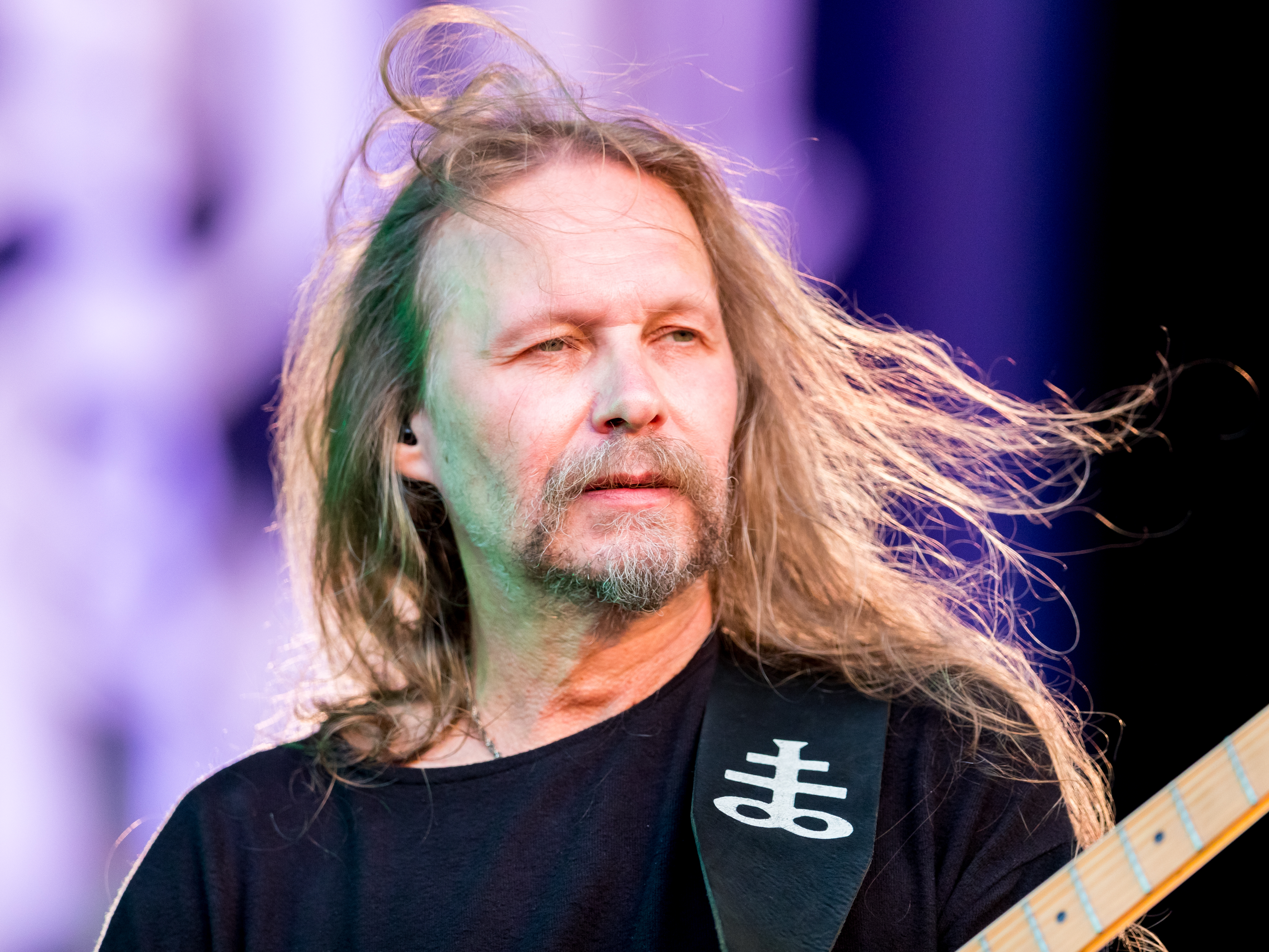
- Wead with Mercyful Fate in 2022

Background information
- Born: Mickael Vikström; 6 April 1967 (age 59); Boden, Sweden
- Genres: Heavy metal, progressive metal, Death Metal, doom metal
- Occupations: Musician, studio engineer
- Instruments: Guitar, keyboards
- Years active: 1987–present
- Member of: King Diamond, Mercyful Fate, bibleblack
- Formerly of: Hexenhaus, The Project Hate MCMXCIX

Mike Wead (born Mickael Vikström on 6 April 1967) is a Swedish guitarist who lives in Stockholm. Wead contributed to heavy metal bands such as Hexenhaus, Memento Mori, Abstrakt Algebra, The Haunted, Edge of Sanity, Candlemass, The Project Hate. Currently Wead is the guitarist of Mercyful Fate, King Diamond, and bibleblack.

== Discography ==
=== With Mercyful Fate ===
1. Dead Again (1998)
2. 9 (1999)

=== With King Diamond ===
1. Abigail II: The Revenge (2002)
2. The Puppet Master (2003)
3. Deadly Lullabyes Live (2004)
4. Give Me Your Soul... Please (2007)
5. Songs for the Dead Live (2019)
6. The Institute (TBA)

=== With Hexenhaus ===
1. A Tribute to Insanity (1988)
2. At the Edge of Eternity (1990)
3. Awakening (1991)
4. Dejavoodoo (1997)

=== With Memento Mori ===
1. Rhymes of Lunacy (1993)
2. Life, Death, and Other Morbid Tales (1994)
3. La Danse Macabre (1996)
4. Songs for the Apocalypse Vol IV (1997)

=== With Abstrakt Algebra ===
- Abstrakt Algebra (1995)

=== With Bibleblack ===
- The Black Swan Epilogue (2009)

=== With Escape The Cult ===
- All You Want To (2014)

== Selected Guest Appearances ==
With Candlemass

- Nightfall (1987)
- As It Is, As It Was (1994)
- Leif Edling The Black Heart of Candlemass (2002)

With Memory Garden

- Verdict of Prosterity (1998)

With Edge of Sanity

- Crimson II (2003)

With Notre Dame

- Demi Monde Bizarros (2004)

With In Aeternum

- Dawn of the New Aeon (2005)

With Elvenking

- The Scythe (2007)

With Her Whisper

- The Great Unifier (2008)

With Sinners Paradise

- The Awakening (2009)

With Kamlath

- Stronger Than Frost (2010)

With The Project Hate MCMXCIX

- The Lustrate Process (2009)
- Bleeding The New Apocalypse (Cum Victriciis in Manibus Armis) (2011)

With Deadlands

- Evilution (2012)

With Pharaoh

- Bury the Light (2012)

With Snowy Shaw

- Snowy Shaw is Alive! (2012)
- Nachtgeist (2016)

With Minions

- Soul Mirror (2013)

With Entombed

- When in Sodom (2012)

With Zoromr

- Corpus Hermeticum (2015)

With Devilish Impressions

- The I (2017)

With Pigface Beauty

- Love & Hate (2017)
