= Death Magic Doom =

Studio album by Candlemass
- Released: 3 April 2009
- Recorded: 2008
- Studio: Polar Studios, Stockholm
- Genre: Epic doom metal
- Length: 47:27
- Label: Nuclear Blast

Candlemass chronology
Lucifer Rising (2008)	Death Magic Doom (2009)	Psalms for the Dead (2012)

Professional ratings
Review scores
Source	Rating
About.com	4.5/5 stars
AllMusic	4/5 stars
Blabbermouth.net	9/10
Brave Words & Bloody Knuckles	8.5/10
Chronicles of Chaos	9.5/10
Exclaim!	(favourable)
Metal Storm	8.9/10
Metal Rules	4.0/5
Rock Hard	10.0/10

Death Magic Doom is the tenth studio album by Swedish doom metal band Candlemass.

== History ==
The working title for this album was "Hammer of Doom", which is the name of the album's second track, but the idea was abandoned due to there being a German festival of the same name. The band recorded it in 2008, and was seeking a release on 27 March 2009. However, the album's release was delayed until 3 April 2009; the United States release date was 5 May 2009.

The bonus track "Lucifer Rising", was taken from the EP Lucifer Rising, released six months before the album.

== Track listing ==
All tracks are written by Leif Edling

No.	Title	Length
1.	"If I Ever Die"	4:54
2.	"Hammer of Doom"	6:16
3.	"The Bleeding Baroness"	7:19
4.	"Demon of the Deep"	5:21
5.	"House of 1,000 Voices"	7:49
6.	"Dead Angel"	4:05
7.	"Clouds of Dementia"	5:38
8.	"My Funeral Dreams"	6:05
Total length:		47:27

Bonus track
No.	Title	Length
9.	"Lucifer Rising"	3:44
Total length:		51:11

== Personnel ==
Candlemass

- Robert Lowe – vocals
- Mats Björkman – rhythm guitar
- Lars Johansson – lead guitars
- Leif Edling – bass
- Jan Lindh – drums

Additional musicians

- Carl Westholm – keyboards
- Stefan Fandén – toy piano

Production

- Chris Laney – engineer, mixing
- Sören von Malmborg – mastering
- Tomas Arfert – cover design and illustration

== Charts ==
Year	Chart	Position
2009	Swedish Albums Chart	33
2009	German Albums Chart	52
