= Candlemass (album) =

Studio album by Candlemass
- Released: 3 May 2005
- Recorded: November–December 2004
- Studio: Polar Studios, Platform Studios and Airplay Studio, Stockholm
- Genre: Epic doom metal
- Length: 55:06 (original version); 58:29 (digipak and double vinyl version)
- Label: Nuclear Blast
- Producer: Pontus Norgren and Candlemass

Candlemass chronology
Doomed for Live – Reunion 2002 (2003)	Candlemass (2005)	King of the Grey Islands (2007)

Singles from Candlemass
- 1. "Assassin of the Light" Released: 2005; 2. "Black Dwarf" Released: 2007

Professional ratings
Review scores
Source	Rating
AllMusic	4/5 stars
Blabbermouth.net	8.5/10
Chronicles of Chaos	8.5/10
Exclaim!	(favourable)
PopMatters	8/10 stars
Rock Hard	8.5/10

Candlemass is the eighth studio album by Swedish doom metal band Candlemass, released on 3 May 2005 through Nuclear Blast Records. It is the band's last album to feature vocalist Messiah Marcolin.

A video for the album's opening track "Black Dwarf" was made. The song "Witches" was also included in the soundtrack for the 2009 video game Brütal Legend.

== Track listing ==
All tracks are written by Leif Edling

No.	Title	Length
1.	"Black Dwarf"	5:43
2.	"Seven Silver Keys"	4:59
3.	"Assassin of the Light"	6:29
4.	"Copernicus"	7:17
5.	"The Man Who Fell from the Sky" (Instrumental)	3:26
6.	"Witches"	6:22
7.	"Born in a Tank"	4:56
8.	"Spellbreaker"	7:02
9.	"The Day and the Night"	8:52
Total length:		55:06

Digipak and double vinyl edition bonus track
No.	Title	Length
10.	"Mars and Volcanos"	3:23
Total length:		58:29

== Personnel ==
Candlemass

- Messiah Marcolin – vocals
- Mats Björkman – rhythm guitar
- Lars Johansson – lead guitars
- Leif Edling – bass
- Jan Lindh – drums

Additional musicians

- Carl Westholm – additional keyboards

Production

- Pontus Norgren – producer, engineer, mixing
- Uffe Larsson, Anders Ringman – vocal overdubs engineers at Platform Studios
- Niklas Flyckt – mixing
- Claes Persson – mastering

== Charts ==
Year	Chart	Position
2005	Swedish Albums Chart	7
2005	German Albums Chart	96
