= Candlemass (band) =

Swedish doom metal band

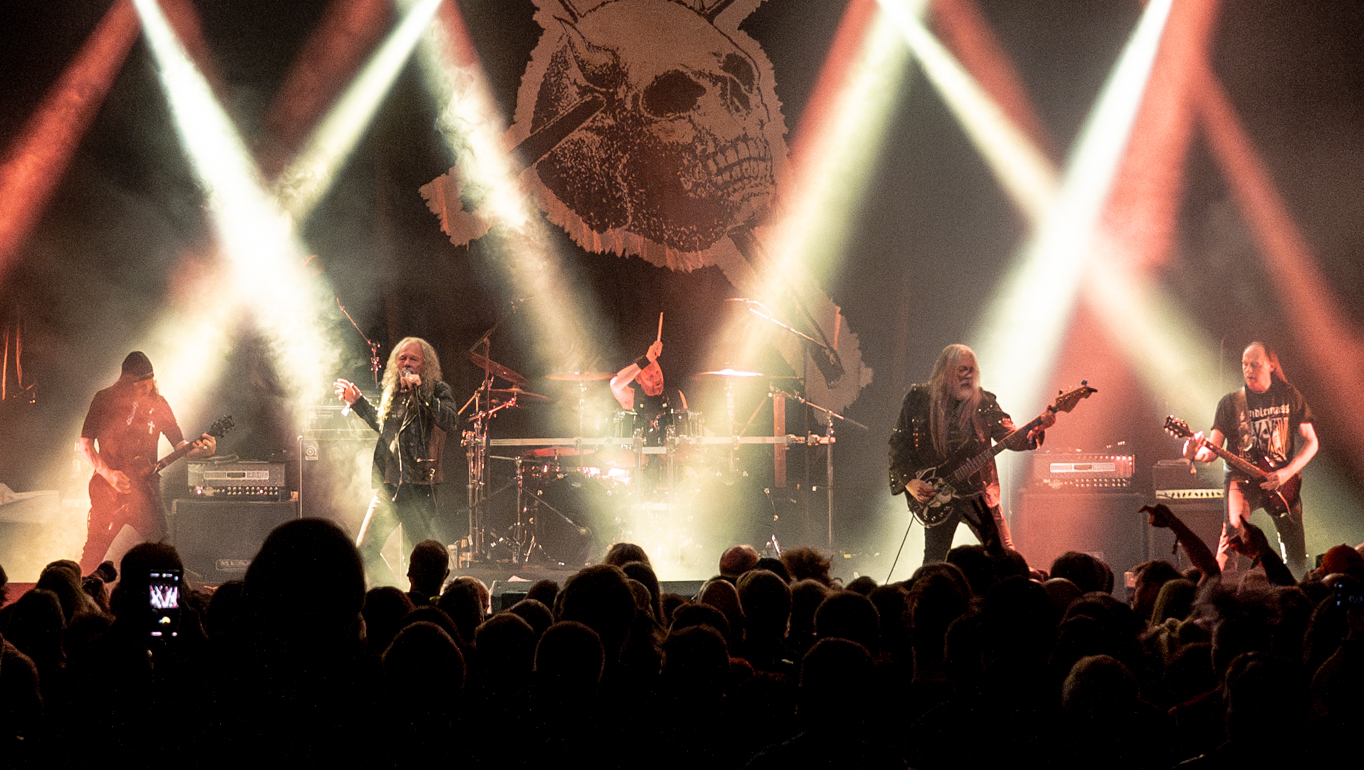
- Candlemass performing in 2024

Background information
- Also known as: Nemesis (1982–1984)
- Origin: Stockholm, Sweden
- Genre: Epic doom metal
- Years active: 1984–1993; 1997–2002; 2004–present
- Labels: Capitol; Metal Blade; Restless; Nuclear Blast; Napalm
- Members: Leif Edling; Mats Björkman; Lars Johansson; Jan Lindh; Johan Längqvist
- Past members: Klas Bergwall; Matz Ekström; Messiah Marcolin; Thomas Vikström; Björn Flodkvist; Jejo Perkovic; Michael Amott; Carl Westholm; Mats Ståhl; Robert Lowe; Mats Levén
- Website: candlemass.se

Candlemass is a Swedish epic doom metal band formed in Upplands Väsby, a suburb of Stockholm, in 1984 by bassist, songwriter, and bandleader Leif Edling, alongside drummer Matz Ekström. The band has had a defining influence on doom metal, with the epic doom genre itself taking its name from their 1986 debut album Epicus Doomicus Metallicus. Along with Pentagram, Saint Vitus, and Trouble, Candlemass has been recognised as one of the "big four" of doom metal.

After releasing five full-length albums and extensively touring throughout the 1980s and early 1990s, Candlemass disbanded in 1993 but reunited four years later. Following another breakup in 2002, the band reformed in 2004 and has continued to record and perform ever since.

== History ==
=== Debut with Johan Längqvist and the Messiah Marcolin era (1984–1990) ===
After the breakup of his first band, Nemesis, bassist Leif Edling formed Candlemass, recruiting session vocalist Johan Längqvist, drummer Matz Ekström, guitarist Mats "Mappe" Björkman, and Klas Bergwall. Their debut release, Epicus Doomicus Metallicus (1986), quickly established their reputation, securing their place within metal circles and marking a milestone in the doom metal scene. After the release of their debut album, Längqvist was replaced by Messiah Marcolin. By the time the band entered the studio to record their second album, Nightfall, in 1987, Bergwall and Ekström had left the group. Jan Lindh joined as the new drummer, and Lars Johansson was added on guitars following the completion of the album.

Candlemass followed up with Ancient Dreams (1988) and Tales of Creation (1989). In 1990, they released the live album Live. Shortly afterward, internal disputes led to Messiah Marcolin's departure from the band in 1991.

=== Vikström/Flodqvist albums, hiatus, and reunion with Marcolin (1991–2006) ===
After Marcolin's departure, Candlemass recruited vocalist Thomas Vikström and recorded Chapter VI (1992). The band toured to support the album, but by 1993, Candlemass had disbanded, partly due to the commercial failure of Chapter VI, and partly because Edling had formed a new project, Abstrakt Algebra. After Abstrakt Algebra failed to gain traction, Edling recruited a new lineup (with Björn Flodqvist on vocals) under the Candlemass name in 1997 and released their sixth album Dactylis Glomerata in the following year, which was a blend of material intended for a new Abstrakt Algebra album and new Candlemass songs. The next album, From the 13th Sun, was released in 1999.

In 2002, a previous Candlemass lineup reunited and performed several well-received live shows, releasing another live album. Additionally, remastered versions of Epicus Doomicus Metallicus, Nightfall, Ancient Dreams, and Tales of Creation were issued, alongside a DVD titled Documents of Doom. They appeared at the Wacken Open Air music festival in August of 2002. The band began working on new material and recorded some songs while seeking a record label. However, internal differences resurfaced, leading to Candlemass disbanding again. In the interim, Leif Edling launched a new project, Krux, featuring former Abstrakt Algebra vocalist Mats Levén and two members of Entombed.

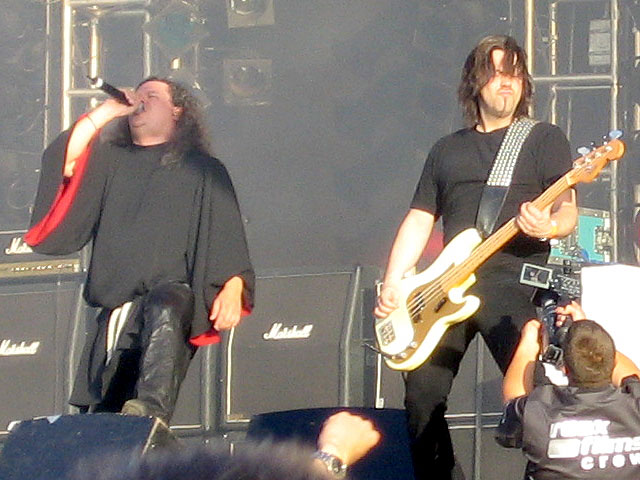
Messiah and Leif at Wacken Open Air 2005

In November 2004, the band announced their second reunion. They recorded a new album, simply titled Candlemass, with the same lineup, and it was released in May 2005. The album earned them a Swedish Grammy that year.

In 2006, the band revealed plans for a new album, slated for release in 2007. However, in October 2006, after ongoing uncertainty surrounding Messiah Marcolin's involvement, it was confirmed that he had left the band for good.

=== Robert Lowe era (2007–2012) ===
Candlemass found a new vocalist, Robert Lowe (Solitude Aeturnus), who recorded with the band on their ninth album, King of the Grey Islands, released on 22 June 2007. The album was self-produced, except for four songs produced by Andy Sneap.

In March 2008, Mats "Mappe" Björkman was sentenced to two years in prison for grand theft, having been convicted of stealing over 35,000 CDs and DVDs worth approximately 3 million SEK (around $500,000).

Candlemass worked on their tenth studio album in 2008, initially titled Hammer of Doom. However, they later renamed it Death Magic Doom to avoid conflict with a German festival of the same name. The album was originally scheduled for release on 27 March 2009 but was delayed until 3 April 2009. The band performed at the Wacken Open Air music festival in 2010. They signed with the Austrian label Napalm Records in 2011, who released their eleventh studio album, Psalms for the Dead, in June 2012. Despite this, bassist Leif Edling stated that the band would not split up, but wanted to stop before they "get too old and start putting out half-lame albums."

=== Mats Levén era (2012–2018) ===
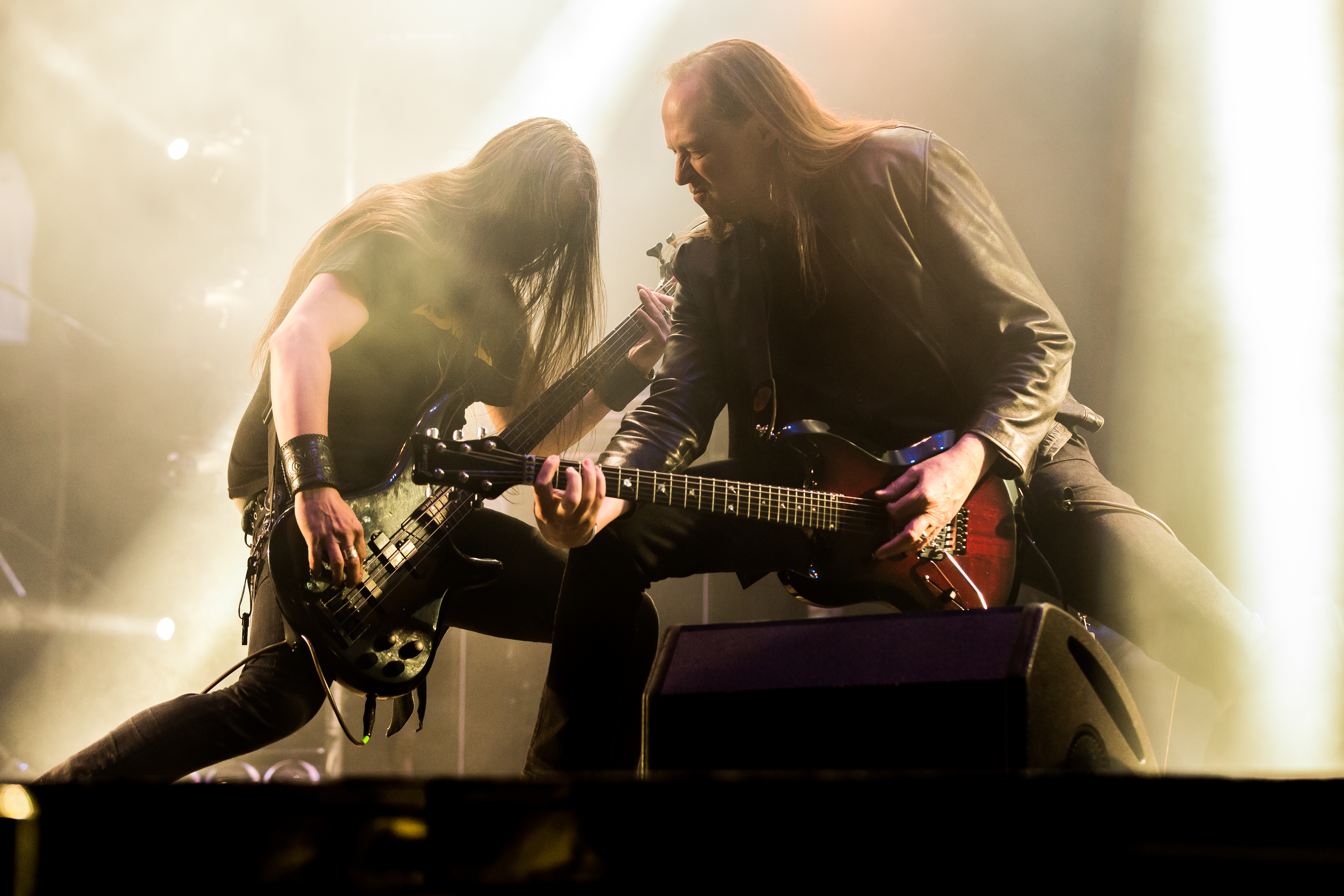
Candlemass at Party.San 2017

On 2 June 2012, Candlemass announced via their website that Robert Lowe had left the band as vocalist, primarily due to concerns over the quality of live performances. The band described this as "a very difficult decision." Lowe was replaced for the band's upcoming shows by longtime friend and collaborator Mats Levén, known for his work with Yngwie Malmsteen, Therion, Treat, and At Vance among others. Levén had previously worked with Leif Edling in Abstrakt Algebra and Krux and had contributed vocals on demos for the Candlemass and King of the Grey Islands sessions, which are included in the box set Doomology. Additionally, keyboardist Per Wiberg (formerly of Opeth and Spiritual Beggars) joined the band on stage for these live performances.

In January 2013, Candlemass was voted the greatest Swedish hard rock/metal band of all time by the writers of Sweden Rock Magazine. They were featured in a list of the 100 greatest Swedish hard rock/metal bands of all time in a jubilee edition celebrating the magazine's 100th issue. It was also revealed that Candlemass, along with death metal band Entombed (ranked No. 2 on the list), would perform together at a special jubilee concert in Stockholm, arranged by the magazine.

Despite earlier claims that Psalms for the Dead would be their final album, bassist Leif Edling later indicated that he was open to recording new music with Candlemass. To coincide with the 30th anniversary of Epicus Doomicus Metallicus, Candlemass released the EP Death Thy Lover on 3 June 2016. Additionally, on 29 April 2016, the band released a career-spanning coffee-table book. The book also included two CDs featuring top picks by Leif Edling and Messiah Marcolin, a CD with rare tracks from their early career (including the Witchcraft demo), and two DVDs with three live performances.

=== Reunion with Johan Längqvist (2018–present) ===
On 3 September 2018, Candlemass announced the return of Längqvist to the band after a 32-year hiatus. The band stated, "We wanted to find our way back to the roots of Candlemass, back to the soul and essence of the band. Johan Längqvist is back, and we hope this will give us some new energy and kickstart the heart of doom again. We don't know if it will last 10 more years or even 5, but if it will give us just another year of having fun and playing the music that we love so much, it will be a blast! The circle is closed; Johan is back!" The band also announced that they were recording a new album for a 2019 release, making it not only the first Candlemass studio album since 2012's Psalms for the Dead, but their first with Längqvist since 1986's Epicus Doomicus Metallicus.

On 6 December 2018, Candlemass announced that their twelfth album would be titled The Door to Doom and would be released on 22 February 2019. It was also revealed that the album would feature a guest appearance by Black Sabbath's Tony Iommi, who contributes a guitar solo to one of the album's tracks, "Astorolus – The Great Octopus". The band released an EP, The Pendulum, on 27 March 2020. Shortly after its release, Leif Edling said that Candlemass was unlikely to release their next studio album until 2022 or 2023.

On 18 August 2022, the band announced their thirteenth studio album, Sweet Evil Sun, and the album's first single, "Scandinavian Gods", was released on the same day. The album was released on 18 November. Candlemass toured in 2023 in support of the album.

In March 2024, the band participated in the Hell's Heroes music festival, which took place at White Oak Music Hall in Houston and was headlined by Sodom and Queensrÿche. Their setlist primarily consisted of material from Nightfall.

Candlemass released an EP, Black Star, on 9 May 2025, and its only single "Black Star" one month prior. The band reunited with former singer Messiah Marcolin for the first time in nineteen years at the Rock Hard Festival in Athens, Greece on 13 September 2025; Edling stated that it would be a one-off show: "No recordings, no tours, nothing more, just one show."

In January 2026, Edling announced that Candlemass will begin writing new material for their next studio album, which they are planning to record in 2027 and release later that year or early 2028.

== Musical style and influences ==
Candlemass is considered a doom metal band with a sound described as exhibiting "dirge-like, sustain-laden guitar riffing", though the band's style has evolved over the years, blending a heavier sound with elements or influences of classical music, blues rock, psychedelic rock, progressive rock, and groove metal. Candlemass' musical style is significantly influenced by early Black Sabbath. Edling, the band's main songwriter and sole constant member, has drawn inspiration from Black Sabbath, as well as from bands such as Blue Öyster Cult, Mercyful Fate/King Diamond, Bachman–Turner Overdrive, Rush, Nazareth, the Jimi Hendrix Experience, Judas Priest, Motörhead, and Venom.

== Legacy ==
Candlemass are considered pioneers of the doom metal subgenre of heavy metal, and the group's 1986 debut album Epicus Doomicus Metallicus played a part in coining the genre's name. According to Eduardo Rivadavia of AllMusic, Candlemass "helped reintroduce the lumbering power chords of Black Sabbath to an entire generation of post-new wave of British heavy metal and post-thrash metalheads, almost single-handedly writing the handbook for the modern doom metal movement in the process." The band is cited as one of doom metal's "big four", along with American bands Pentagram, Saint Vitus and Trouble.

== Band members ==
Current

- Leif Edling – bass (1984–1993, 1997–present), vocals (1984–1986)
- Mats "Mappe" Björkman – rhythm guitar (1984–1993, 2001–present)
- Johan Längqvist – vocals (1986, 2018–present; live guest 2007, 2010, 2011)
- Lars Johansson – lead guitar (1986–1993, 2001–present)
- Jan Lindh – drums (1986–1993, 2001–present)

== Discography ==
=== Studio albums ===
Year	Album	Peak chart positions		
Year	Album	SWE	GER	US
1986	Epicus Doomicus Metallicus	—	—	—
1987	Nightfall	—	—	—
1988	Ancient Dreams	45	—	174
1989	Tales of Creation	48	—	—
1992	Chapter VI	43	—	—
1998	Dactylis Glomerata	—	—	—
1999	From the 13th Sun	—	—	—
2005	Candlemass	7	96	—
2007	King of the Grey Islands	32	83	—
2009	Death Magic Doom	33	52	—
2012	Psalms for the Dead	19	58	—
2019	The Door to Doom	13	18	—
2022	Sweet Evil Sun	52	42	—
"—" denotes that the recording did not chart, was not released in that territory, or is uncertified.

=== Live albums ===
- Live (1990)
- Doomed for Live – Reunion 2002 (2002)
- No Sleep 'til Athens (2010)
- Ashes to Ashes (2010)
- Epicus Doomicus Metallicus – Live at Roadburn 2011 (2013)
- Live at the Marquee 1988 (2013)
- Dynamo Doom (2019)

=== Compilation albums ===
- The Best of Candlemass: As It Is, as It Was (1994)
- Black Heart of Candlemass (2002)
- Diamonds of Doom (2003) (limited vinyl record)
- Essential Doom (2004)
- Dactylis Glomerata & Abstrakt Algebra II (previously unreleased album) (2008)
- Introducing (2013) (career-spanning album)
- Behind the Wall of Doom (2016)

=== Box sets ===
- Doomology (2010)

=== EPs and singles ===
- Samarithan (1988)
- At the Gallows End (1988)
- Sjunger Sigge Fürst (1993)
- Wiz (1998)
- Nimis (2001)
- At the Gallows End/Samarithan (2005)
- Dark Reflections/Into the Unfathomed Tower (2005)
- Mirror Mirror/The Bells of Acheron (2005)
- Solitude/Crystal Ball (2005)
- Assassin of the Light (2005)
- Black Dwarf (with Robert Lowe on vocals) (2007)
- Lucifer Rising (2008)
- If I Ever Die (2009)
- Don't Fear the Reaper (2010)
- Dancing in the Temple of the Mad Queen Bee (13 April 2012)
- Candlemass vs. Entombed (Limited edition CD, recorded for Sweden Rock Magazine's 100th issue)
- Death Thy Lover (2016)
- Dark Are the Veils of Death (2017)
- House of Doom (2018)
- The Pendulum (2020)
- Black Star (2025)

=== Demos ===
- Witchcraft (1984)
- Second demo (1984)
- Tales of Creation (1985)
- Demo with Marcolin (1987)

=== DVDs ===
- Documents of Doom (2002)
- The Curse of Candlemass (2005)
- Candlemass 20 Year Anniversary (2007)
- Ashes to Ashes Live (2010)
