= Leif Edling =

Swedish bassist

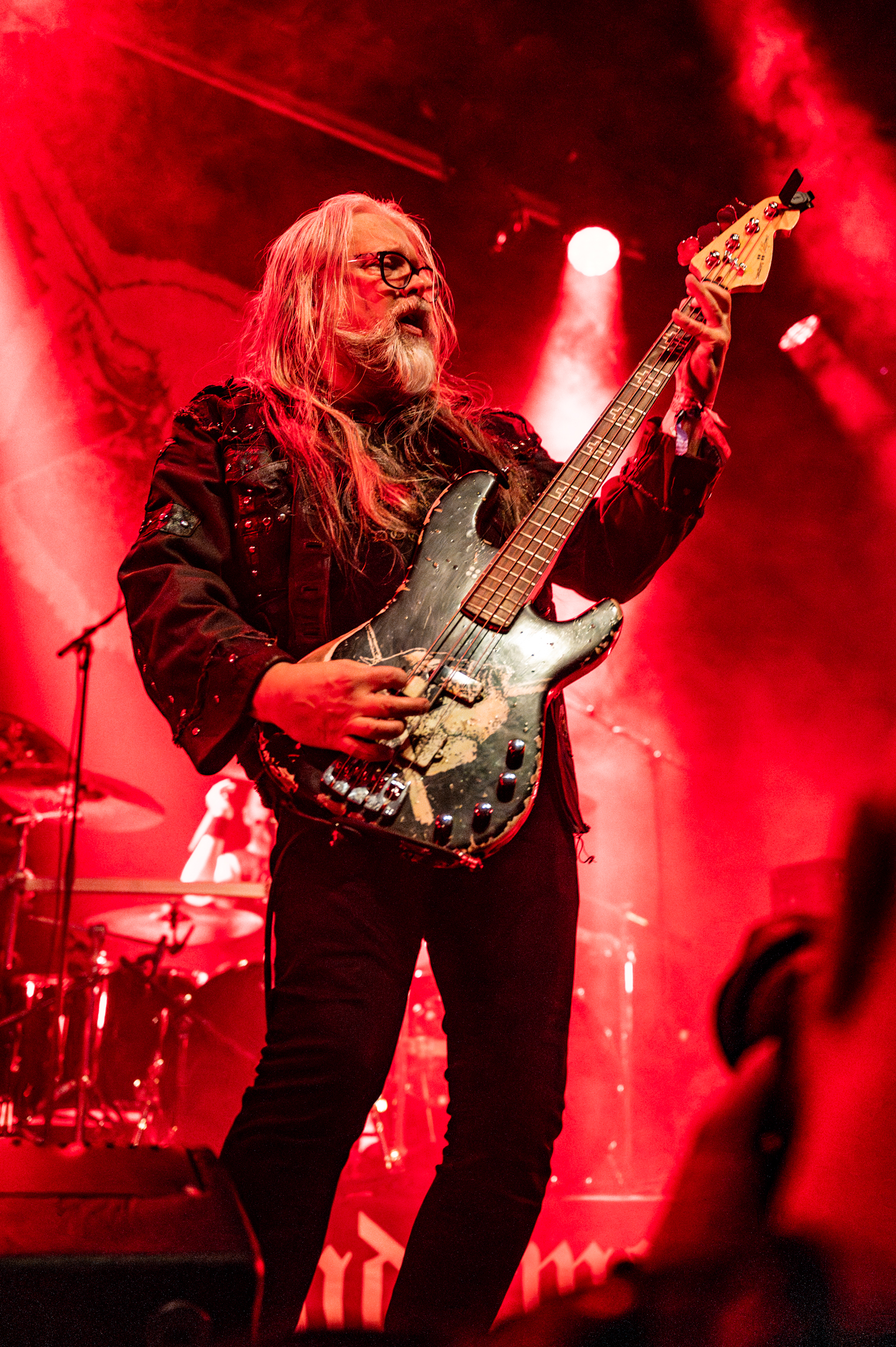
- Edling in 2024

Background information
- Born: 6 August 1963 (age 62)
- Genres: Epic doom metal, doom metal, heavy metal
- Occupations: Musician, songwriter
- Instrument: Bass
- Years active: 1979–present

Leif Edling (born 6 August 1963) is a Swedish musician, best known as the bassist, main songwriter and one of the founding members of the doom metal band Candlemass. He is the only constant member of the band since its inception to the present day. Nevertheless, since the band's second reunion in 2002, Edling has been backed up again by founding rhythm guitarist Mats Björkman, who had been absent from 1997 to 2002.

== Biography ==
Edling started his musical career in the band Trilogy, then under the name of Toxic, as a singer together with Ian Haugland (later the drummer of Europe) in 1979. He then played in a band named Witchcraft but left in 1981 and formed Nemesis in 1982. Before the Candlemass official releases, Edling also handled vocal duties in addition to playing bass.

After the departure of Messiah Marcolin, Candlemass became his solo project, until the band reformed in 2002. In 1994, when Candlemass fell apart, Leif had started the band Abstrakt Algebra with Mats Levén on vocals and Mike Wead on guitar. The band met with limited success and disbanded after one album.

In 2002, he founded another doom metal band, named Krux, also with Mats Levén on vocals, and in 2013 founded Avatarium with Marcus Jidell on guitar and Jidell's wife, Jennie-Ann Smith on vocals.

From 2014 to 2019, Edling was unable to tour with both Candlemass and Avatarium due to unspecified health problems, believed to be chronic fatigue syndrome. A variety of replacement members were used, including Grave/Entombed bassist Jörgen Sandström.

== Discography ==
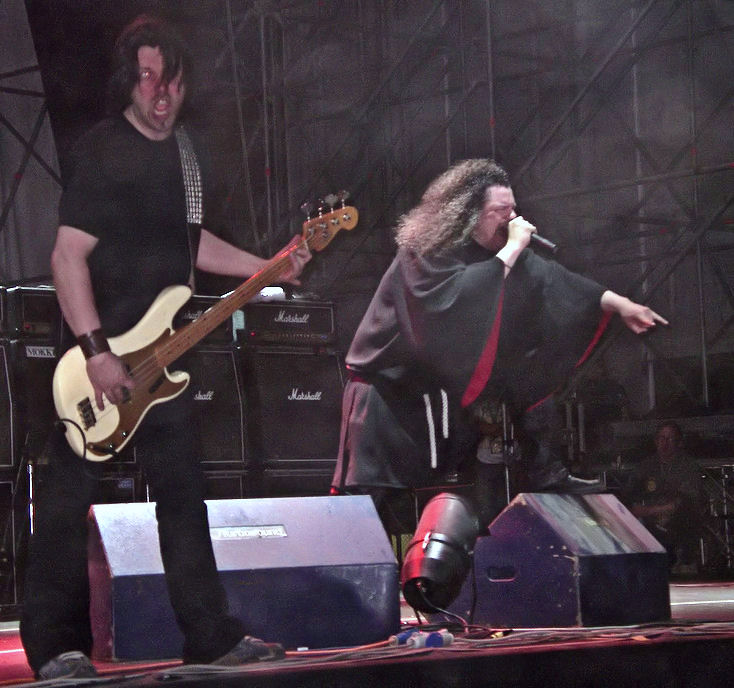
Edling (left) with Candlemass in 2005

=== With Nemesis ===
- The Day of Retribution −1984

=== With Candlemass ===
- Epicus Doomicus Metallicus – 1986
- Nightfall – 1987
- Ancient Dreams – 1988
- Tales of Creation – 1989
- Live – 1990 (live)
- Chapter VI – 1992
- Dactylis Glomerata – 1998
- From the 13th Sun – 1999
- Doomed for Live – Reunion 2002 – 2003 (live double CD)
- Candlemass – 2005
- King of the Grey Islands – 2007
- 20 Year Anniversary Party – 2007 (DVD)
- Lucifer Rising – 2008 (EP)
- Death Magic Doom – 2009
- Psalms for the Dead – 2012
- Death Thy Lover – 2016 (EP)
- House of Doom – 2018 (EP)
- The Door to Doom – 2019
- The Pendulum – 2020 (EP)
- Sweet Evil Sun - 2022

=== With Abstrakt Algebra ===
- Abstrakt Algebra – 1994
- Abstrakt Algebra II – 2008

=== With Krux ===
- Krux – 2003
- II – 2006
- III – He Who Sleeps Amongst the Stars – 2011

=== With Avatarium ===
- Moonhorse – 2013 (12")
- Avatarium – 2013 (CD, double LP)
- All I Want – 2014 (12")
- The Girl with the Raven Mask – 2015 (CD, double LP)
- Hurricanes and Halos – 2017 (CD, double LP)
- The Fire I Long For (2019)
- Death, Where Is Your Sting (2022)

=== With The Doomsday Kingdom ===
- The Doomsday Kingdom – 2017

=== Solo ===
- Songs of Torment, Songs of Joy – 2008
