= Epicus Doomicus Metallicus =

Studio album by Candlemass
- Released: 10 June 1986
- Recorded: February 1986
- Studios: Thunderload Studios, Stockholm
- Genre: Epic doom metal
- Length: 42:51
- Label: Black Dragon
- Producers: Ragne Wahlquist and Candlemass

Candlemass chronology
Epicus Doomicus Metallicus (1986)	Nightfall (1987)

Epicus Doomicus Metallicus is the debut studio album by Swedish doom metal band Candlemass, released on 10 June 1986 by Black Dragon Records.

On its release, the album had a significantly different sound than other European heavy metal bands of the time, because of their use of operatic vocals mixed over slow and heavy guitar riffs. The album did not sell well on its initial release, which led to the group being dropped from the label during the same year. Since then, the album has been re-issued in several different formats. The album title Epicus Doomicus Metallicus is a dog latin translation rendering of Epic Doom Metal — the genre which the band helped pioneer and with which it is most commonly identified. Although he was actually a guest musician at the time of its recording, this was the only Candlemass album to feature vocalist Johan Längqvist until he joined the band, officially, in 2018.

== Production ==
In 1985, the members of Candlemass began writing the songs "Under the Oak", "Crystal Ball", "Demons Gate" and "Dark Reflections" in Upplands Väsby. In November 1985, the group recorded a demo album at O.A.L Studios, which featured the songs "Demons Gate" and "Black Stone Wielder". The band did not have a regular lead singer at the time and Leif Edling performed vocals for the demo. The group sent the demo to Black Dragon Records in Paris, France, who offered Candlemass a one-record deal with a budget of $1,800.

In February 1986, Epicus Doomicus Metallicus was recorded at Thunderload Studios in Stockholm, Sweden, with producer Ragne Wahlquist from the metal band Heavy Load. Still without a regular vocalist, Johan Längqvist performed the vocals despite not hearing any of the music the band had performed beforehand.

== Musical style ==
Epicus Doomicus Metallicus' differs from other European metal bands who were known for "playing at breakneck speeds and screaming in a high-pitched frenzy". Candlemass' album features slower riffs and vocals delivered in a "baritone, operatic style". The opening song "Solitude" features lyrics revolving around themes of suicide and depression.

== Release ==
Epicus Doomicus Metallicus was released on 10 June 1986 on vinyl and CD. The band was dropped from Black Dragon Records due to disappointing album sales. Candlemass followed up the album with Nightfall (1987), after being signed to Axis Records.

The album has been re-issued in several formats. These include a re-issue by Powerline Records in 2002 that included a bonus disc of a live performance recorded in Birmingham in 1988. In 2011, the album was re-issued by Peaceville Records with an expanded booklet and the same bonus disc.

== Reception and legacy ==
Professional ratings
Review scores
Source	Rating
AllMusic	4.5/5 stars
Collector's Guide to Heavy Metal	7/10
Pitchfork	8.4/10

Epicus Doomicus Metallicus received positive reviews from critics. Eduardo Rivadavia of the online music database AllMusic referred to the album as "a pillar of classic '80s metal" offering "the strongest, most consistent songwriting of the band's career", although it "was let down by vocalist Johan Längqvist, whose performance failed to deliver with the power and command of his immediate successor Messiah Marcolin." Canadian reviewer Martin Popoff lauded the "new expression of doom as black as Black Sabbath" and the executions and mix of the six tracks of the album, but found them "too manic depressive too uniformly". Aaron Aedy, rhythm guitarist from goth / death-doom pioneers Paradise Lost, declared that Epicus Doomicus Metallicus was a "massive record" for them.

Chris Chantler of Metal Hammer wrote in 2020: "With that audacious, literally genre-defining title, Candlemass honed and nailed an entire sound, style and atmosphere. Each song is virtually a template for How To Do Epic Doom Metal, from disconsolate opening monolith Solitude to the ornamental closing synths and female vocals of A Sorcerer’s Pledge."

== Track listings ==
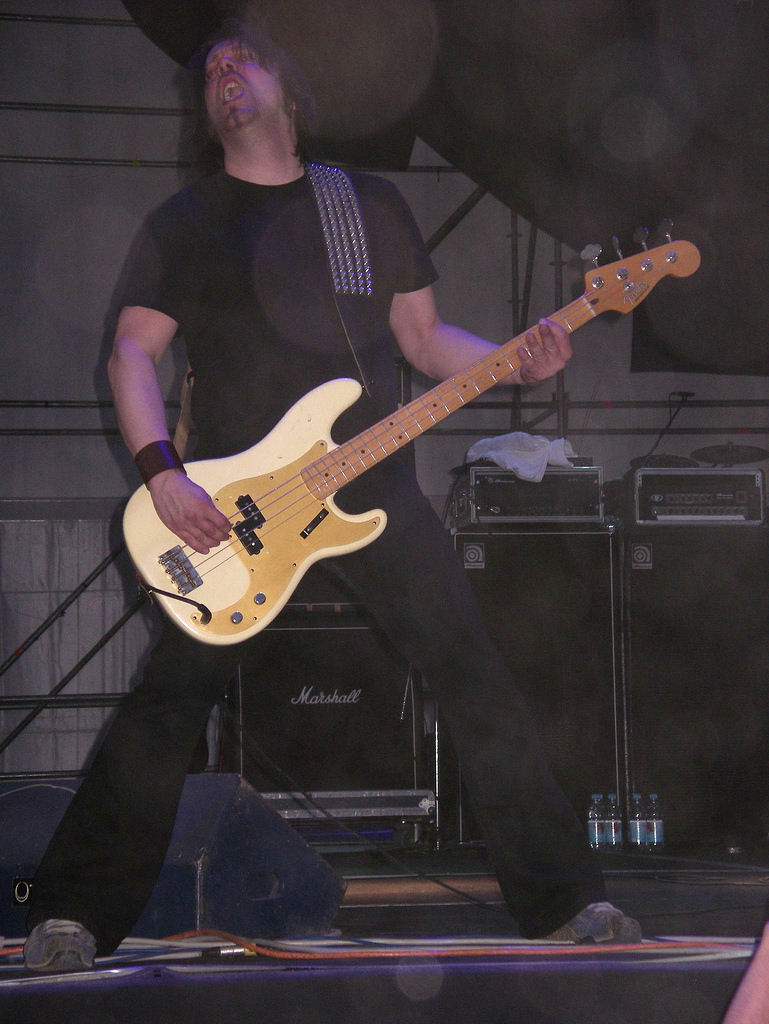
Leif Edling wrote all the original songs for Epicus Doomicus Metallicus.

All tracks were written by Leif Edling.

Side one
No.	Title	Length
1.	"Solitude"	5:38
2.	"Demon's Gate"	9:12
3.	"Crystal Ball"	5:23

Side two
No.	Title	Length
4.	"Black Stone Wielder"	7:34
5.	"Under the Oak"	6:54
6.	"A Sorcerer's Pledge"	8:20
Total length:		42:51

Bonus disc (Live in Birmingham, March 1988)
No.	Title	Length
1.	"The Well of Souls"	7:25
2.	"Demon's Gate"	9:02
3.	"Crystal Ball"	5:18
4.	"Solitude"	6:25
5.	"Bewitched"	6:24
6.	"A Sorcerer's Pledge"	10:53
7.	"Black Sabbath Medley" (Geezer Butler, Tony Iommi, Ozzy Osbourne, Bill Ward)	6:12

== Personnel ==
Candlemass

- Leif Edling – bass
- Mats Björkman – rhythm guitar
- Matz Ekström – drums

Guest musicians

- Johan Längqvist – vocals
- Klas Bergwall – lead guitar
- Christian Weberyd – guitar
- Cille Svenson – female backing vocals on "A Sorcerer's Pledge"

Production

- Ragne Wahlquist – engineer, producer
- Candlemass – artwork, cover art concept, producer
- Ulf Magnusson – photography

=== Bonus CD personnel ===
- Messiah Marcolin – vocals
- Mats Björkman – rhythm guitar
- Lars Johansson – lead guitar
- Leif Edling – bass guitar
- Jan Lindh – drums
