= Messiah Marcolin =

Swedish heavy metal singer

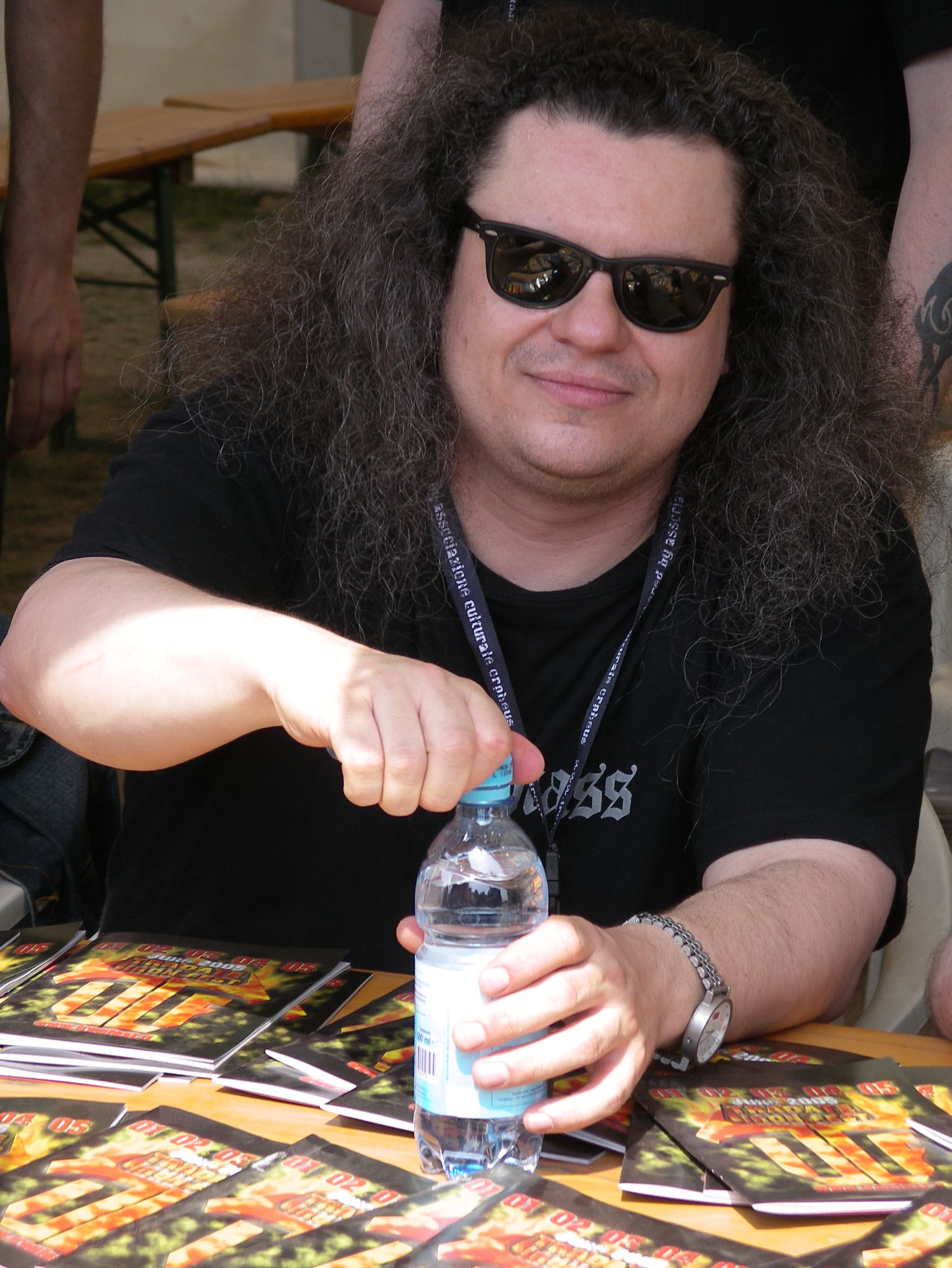
- Marcolin in 2005

Background information
- Also known as: Eddie Marcolin
- Born: Bror Jan Alfredo Marcolin; 10 December 1967 (age 58); Ronneby, Sweden
- Genres: Epic doom metal, doom metal, heavy metal
- Occupation: Singer
- Years active: 1984–2007, 2011–present
- Formerly of: Mercy, Candlemass, Memento Mori

Messiah Marcolin (born Bror Jan Alfredo Marcolin; 10 December 1967), also known as Eddie Marcolin, is a Swedish singer best known for his work with the doom metal band Candlemass from 1987 to 1991 and again from 2002 to 2006. He is known for his operatic voice and for his signature "Doom Dance", an exaggerated stomping motion.

== Career ==
=== 1984–1987: Early career ===
Marcolin's first releases were with the heavy metal band Mercy. After recording an EP, Mercy was looking for a singer to record with and Messiah was asked to join just two weeks before recording. He sang on two Mercy albums, the first was their self-titled debut album in 1984, and Witchburner a year later. The albums were influenced by Black Sabbath while the falsetto shrieks were influenced by Mercyful Fate singer King Diamond. Looking for a heavier direction, Messiah decided to leave the band.

=== 1987–1991: First tenure with Candlemass ===
Marcolin initially joined Candlemass to replace session vocalist Johan Längqvist, who could not be convinced to remain as singer for the band after Epicus Doomicus Metallicus. His debut with Candlemass is the band's second album, Nightfall. He sang on two subsequent albums, Ancient Dreams and Tales of Creation and performed on a live album. Due to personal differences with some of the other members during the Tales of Creation tour in 1991, Marcolin left Candlemass.

=== 1991–2001 ===
Messiah worked on several projects after departing Candlemass. In 1993, he co-founded Memento Mori with Mike Wead and sang on two of their albums in 1993 and 1994 before leaving as he was not being credited for writing the melodies. Messiah then worked with members of Stillborn on a project named "Colossus" and released a demo and contributed a cover of "Sad But True" to a Metallica tribute album titled Metal Militia: A Tribute to Metallica II in 1996. The band was inactive after this recording and Messiah returned to Memento Mori to record and release Songs for the Apocalypse, Vol. 4 in 1997. He also performed guest vocals for the melodic death metal/blackened death metal band Satariel.

=== 2002–2006: Second tenure with Candlemass ===
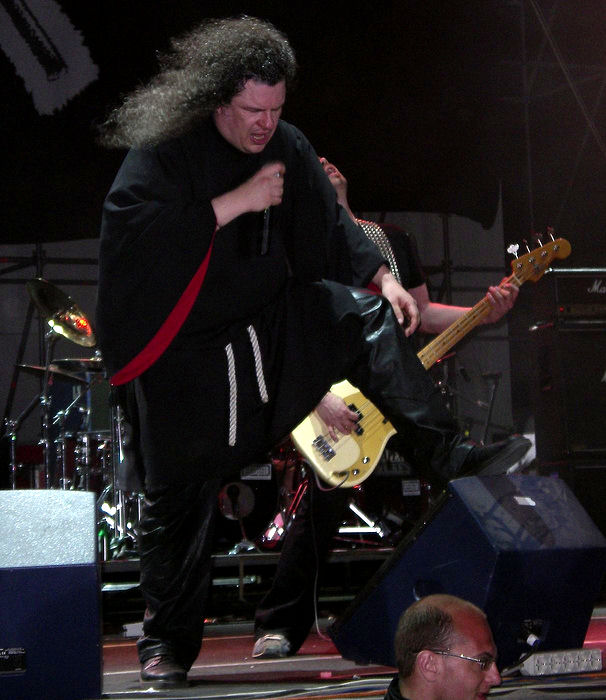
Marcolin with Candlemass in 2005

The "Nightfall era" lineup of Candlemass reformed in 2002 and did various festivals and gigs. Candlemass released recordings from its live activity during this period as Doomed For Live and released a compilation, Essential Doom, which included a demo version of "Witches", a song that would later be included on Candlemass' self-titled 2005 album. After releasing Candlemass, Messiah appeared on two DVD releases: Documents of Doom and The Curse of Candlemass. Candlemass announced in October 2006 that Messiah had departed from the band once again.

Additionally, in 2003, Messiah co-founded Requiem and released a three-song demo, although the band dissolved due to Candlemass' reunion and musical differences within the band.

=== 2007–present ===
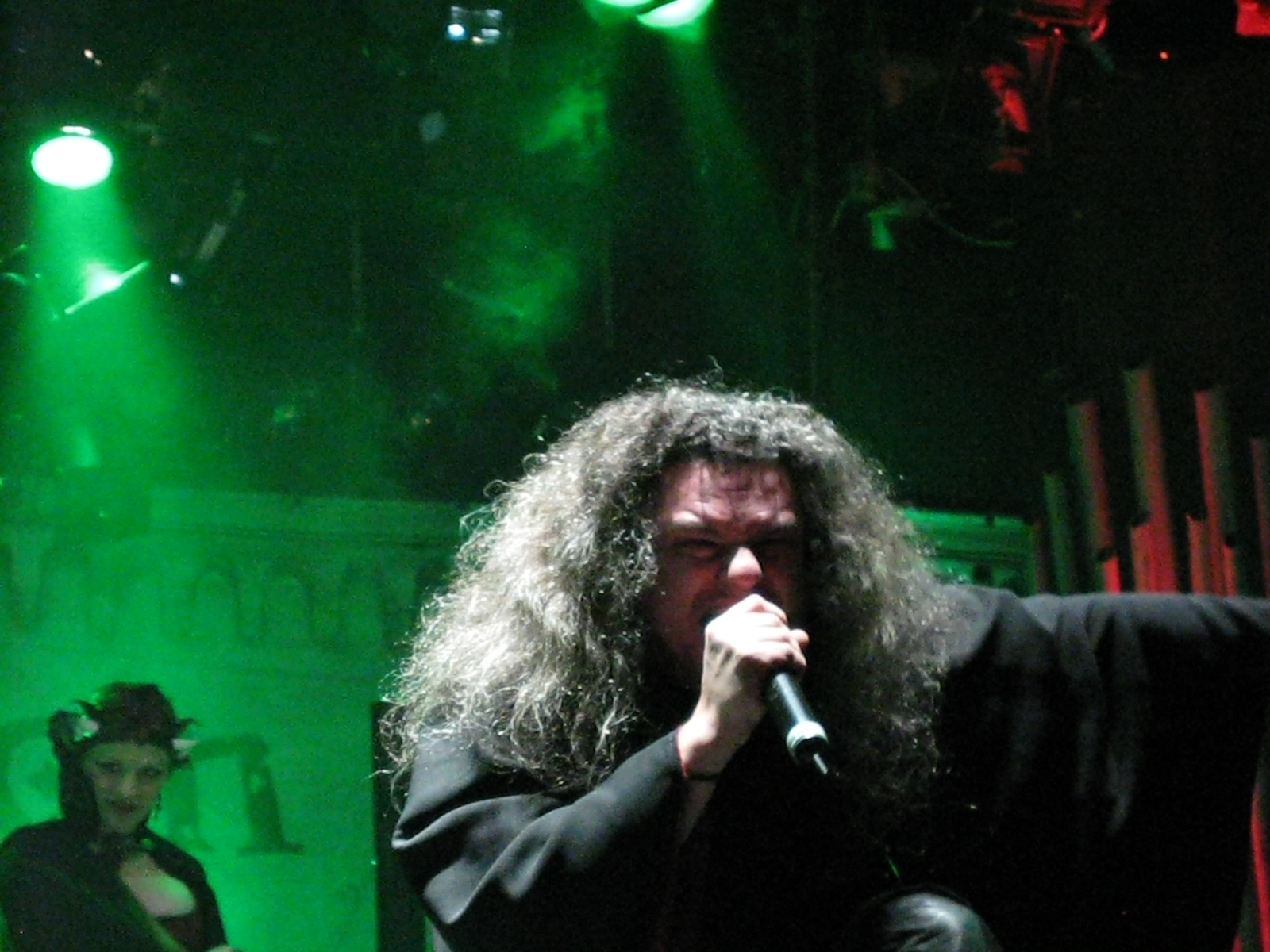
Marcolin with Therion in 2009

Marcolin was a guest vocalist with Therion for a string of live performances in 2007. In 2011, Marcolin appeared live with Swedish heavy metal band Portrait, covering the Mercyful Fate song "Black Funeral". In 2013, he sang on "Hel", a song on Amon Amarth's Deceiver of the Gods.

Marcolin reunited with Candlemass for a one-time performance at the Rock Hard Festival Greece in September 2025.
