= Therion discography =

Discography of the band Therion

- Studio albums: 19
- Live albums: 3
- Compilation albums: 4
- Singles: 5
- Video albums: 1
- Demo albums: 3

This article is a listing of all official releases by Therion, a Swedish symphonic metal band. As of 2025, the band have released 19 studio albums.

== Albums ==
=== Studio albums ===
Title	Album details	Peak chart positions							
Title	Album details	GER	POL	AUT	JPN	NLD	FRA	HUN	SWE
Of Darkness...	Released: February 1991; Label: Deaf Records; Formats: CD, LP, CS, digital download	—	—	—	—	—	—	—	—
Beyond Sanctorum	Released: January 1992; Label: Active Records; Formats: CD, LP, CS, digital download	—	—	—	—	—	—	—	—
Symphony Masses: Ho Drakon Ho Megas	Released: April 1993; Label: Megarock; Formats: CD, LP, CS, digital download	—	—	—	—	—	—	—	—
Lepaca Kliffoth	Released: April 4, 1995; Label: Nuclear Blast; Formats: CD, LP, CS, digital download	—	—	—	—	—	—	—	—
Theli	Released: August 9, 1996; Label: Nuclear Blast; Formats: CD, LP, CS, digital download	—	—	—	—	—	—	—	—
A'arab Zaraq – Lucid Dreaming	Released: May 16, 1997; Label: Nuclear Blast; Formats: CD, LP, CS, digital download	98	—	—	—	—	—	—	—
Vovin	Released: May 4, 1998; Label: Nuclear Blast; Formats: CD, LP, CS, digital download	46	—	48	—	—	—	—	—
Crowning of Atlantis	Released: June 7, 1999; Label: Nuclear Blast; Formats: CD, LP, CS, digital download	87	—	—	—	—	—	—	—
Deggial	Released: January 31, 2000; Label: Nuclear Blast; Formats: CD, LP, CS, digital download	43	—	—	—	—	—	—	—
Secret of the Runes	Released: October 8, 2001; Label: Nuclear Blast; Formats: CD, LP, CS, digital download	74	38	—	—	—	—	—	—
Sirius B	Released: May 24, 2004; Label: Nuclear Blast; Formats: CD, LP, CS, digital download	63	43	—	—	—	—	34	—
Lemuria	Released: May 24, 2004; Label: Nuclear Blast; Formats: CD, LP, CS, digital download	63	43	—	197	76	—	34	—
Gothic Kabbalah	Released: January 12, 2007; Label: Nuclear Blast; Formats: CD, LP, digital download	59	21	—	234	55	58	—	26
Sitra Ahra	Released: September 17, 2010; Label: Nuclear Blast; Formats: CD, LP, digital download	73	—	75	—	95	51	5	—
Les Fleurs du Mal	Released: September 28, 2012; Label: Self-published; Formats: CD, LP, CS, digital download	—	—	—	—	—	—	—	—
Beloved Antichrist	Released: February 9, 2018; Label: Nuclear Blast; Formats: CD, LP, digital download	25	—	46	—	99	125	34	—
Leviathan	Released: January 22, 2021; Label: Nuclear Blast; Formats: CD, LP, digital download	11	25	45	—	—	162	15	—
Leviathan II	Released: October 28, 2022; Label: Nuclear Blast; Formats: CD, LP, digital download	—	—	—	—	—	—	—	—
Leviathan III	Released: December 15, 2023; Label: Napalm Records; Formats: CD, LP, digital download	—	—	—	—	—	—	—	—
"—" denotes a recording that did not chart or was not released in that territory.

=== EPs ===
Title	EP details	Peak chart positions							
Title	EP details	GER	POL	AUT	JPN	NLD	FRA	HUN	SWE
Les Épaves	Released: February 4, 2016; Label: Adulruna; Formats: CD, LP; Limited to 1200 CD copies and 250 LP copies	—	—	—	—	—	—	—	—
"—" denotes album that did not chart or was not released

== Compilation albums ==
Title	Album details
The Early Chapters of Revelation	Released: November 27, 2000; Label: Nuclear Blast; Formats: CD
Bells of Doom	Released: October 31, 2001; Label: Therion Society; Formats: CD
Atlantis Lucid Dreaming	Released: September 6, 2005; Label: Nuclear Blast; Formats: CD, digital download
Cover Songs 1993–2007	Released: April 15, 2022; Label: self-released; Formats: LP, CD, Digipak, MP3

== Singles ==
Title	Year	Album
"The Beauty in Black"	1995	Lepaca Kliffoth
"The Siren of the Woods"	1996	Theli
"Eye of Shiva"	1998	Vovin
"Wand of Abaris"	2006	Gothic Kabbalah
"The Wand of Abaris / Path to Arcady"	2007	Gothic Kabbalah
"Les Sucettes"	2013	Les Fleurs du Mal

== Demos ==
Title	Demo details
Paroxysmal Holocaust	Released: April 1989; Label: Self-published; Formats: CS
Beyond the Darkest Veils of Inner Wickedness	Released: November 1989; Label: Self-published; Formats: CS
Time Shall Tell	Released: 1990; Label: Self-released / House of Kicks; Formats: CS, LP

== Live albums ==
Title	Album details	Peak chart positions			
Title	Album details	GER	NLD	FRA	HUN
Live in Midgård	Released: September 30, 2002; Label: Nuclear Blast; Formats: CD, digital download	—	—	—	—
Live in Mexico	Released: 2006; Label: Scarecrow Records; Formats: CD	—	—	—	—
Live Gothic	Released: July 25, 2008; Label: Nuclear Blast; Formats: CD+DVD, LP, digital download	99	98	—	—
The Miskolc Experience	Released: June 8, 2009; Label: Nuclear Blast; Formats: CD+DVD, digital download	—	—	108	37
Con Orquesta	Released: January 30, 2026; Label: Napalm Records; Formats: CD+DVD+Blu‑ray, LP, digital download	—	—	— (Note: Con Orquesta did not enter the French Top Albums chart, but peaked at number 100 on the French Physical Albums chart.)	—
"—" denotes a recording that did not chart or was not released in that territory.

== Video albums ==
Title	Album details	Peak chart positions	
Title	Album details	SWE	HUN
Celebrators of Becoming	Released: May 5, 2006; Label: Nuclear Blast; Formats: DVD, digital download	2	20
Adulruna Rediviva and Beyond	Released: February 21, 2014; Label: Nuclear Blast; Format: DVD	12	—
Garden of Evil	Released: January 9, 2015; Label: Adulruna; Format: DVD	—	—
"—" denotes a recording that did not chart or was not released in that territory.

== Music videos ==
Year	Title	Director	Album
1992	"Pandemonic Outbreak"	—	Beyond Sanctorum
1993	"A Black Rose"	—	Ho Drakon Ho Megas
1995	"The Beauty in Black"	—	Lepaca Kliffoth
1996	"To Mega Therion"	—	Theli
2001	"Summer Night City"	—	Secret of the Runes
2007	"Son of the Staves of Time"	—	Gothic Kabbalah
2010	"Sitra Ahra"	Fredrik Mattsson	Sitra Ahra
2011	"Kali Yuga III"	—	Sitra Ahra
2012	"J'ai le mal de toi"	Carlos Toro Venegas	Les Fleurs du Mal
2012	"Poupée de cire, poupée de son"	—	Les Fleurs du Mal
2012	"Je n'ai besoin que de tendresse"	—	Les Fleurs du Mal
2013	"Adulruna Rediviva"	Massimiliano Mattioni	Gothic Kabbalah
2013	"Mon amour mon ami"	—	Les Fleurs du Mal
2015	"Initials BB"	—	Les Fleurs du Mal
2018	"Theme of Antichrist"	—	Beloved Antichrist

== See also ==
- Therion audio samples
