= Celebrators of Becoming =

Box set by Therion
- Released: 5 May 2006 (Europe); 13 June 2006 (N.A.)
- Recorded: 1989–2006
- Genre: Symphonic metal Death metal
- Length: 2:03:22 (DVD 1)
- Label: Nuclear Blast

Therion chronology
Atlantis Lucid Dreaming (2005)	Celebrators of Becoming (2006)	Gothic Kabbalah (2007)

Professional ratings
Review scores
Source	Rating
Rock Beast	(not rated)

Celebrators of Becoming is the second box set by Swedish symphonic metal band Therion, released on 5 May 2006. It contains 4 DVDs and 2 audio discs. It is available in two versions: The luxury digipak version in a slip case and the cheaper non-digipak version. Both versions contain all discs. Cover artwork was made by Thomas Ewerhard.

== Content ==
=== DVD: Disc 1 ===
Live video from Mexico City, 2004.

1. "Intro"
2. "Blood of Kingu"
3. "Uthark Runa"
4. "Seven Secrets of the Sphinx"
5. "Asgård"
6. "Son of the Sun"
7. "Invocation of Naamah"
8. "Typhon"
9. "Draconian Trilogy"
10. "Flesh of the Gods"
11. "Schwarzalbenheim"
12. "Ginnungagap"
13. "In Remembrance"
14. "Wild Hunt"
15. "The Invincible"
16. "Melez"
17. "Rise of Sodom and Gomorrah"
18. "The Khlysti Evangelist"
19. "Siren of the Woods"
20. "Quetzalcoatl"
21. "Wine of Aluqah"
22. "Cults of the Shadow"
23. "To Mega Therion"
24. "Iron Fist" (Motörhead cover)
25. "Outro"

=== DVD: Disc 2 ===
Bands' documentary from the 2004-2006 World Tour (North and South America, Europe and Asia).

==== Latin America, 2004 ====
Guadalajara, Mexico:

1. "Soundcheck Guadalajara" – 1:19

El Salvador:

1. "Before Show" – 0:32
2. "Stage Excerpt Seven Secrets" / "Atlantis" / "Siren" – 5:10
3. "After Show" – 0:28

Colombia:

1. "Blood of Kingu" – 5:28
2. "Rise of Sodom and Gomorrah" – 6:50

Bolivia:

1. "A Day in La Paz" – 22:22
2. "Wine of Aluqah" – 4:47

==== North America, 2005 ====
Chicago, U.S.:

1. "Seven Secrets of the Sphinx" – 3:58
2. "Black Sun" – 5:29

Quebec City, Canada:

1. "Wine of Aluqah" – 5:05
2. "Black Funeral" – 2:58

==== East Europe, 2004-2006 ====
Moscow, Russia:

1. "Russian Anthem" – 1:26

Kyiv, Ukraine:

1. "I Wanna Be Somebody" – 4:18

Bucharest, Romania:

1. "Black Funeral" – 3:16
2. "Iron Fist" – 4:20

Ankara, Turkey:

1. "Singing a’ Capella in the Dark" – 3:52
2. "Drumming in the Dark" – 3:42

==== Europe, 2004 ====
Vienna, Austria:

1. "Khlysti Evangelist" – 4:42

Paris, France:

1. "Uthark Runa" – 4:48
2. "Asgård" – 4:02
3. "The Crowning of Atlantis" – 5:12
4. "The invincible" – 5:17

Antwerp, Belgium:

1. "Melez" – 4:13

Strasbourg, France:

1. "Uthark Runa" – 5:02

Stuttgart, Germany:

1. "Backstage" – 0:31
2. "Uthark Runa" – 4:51

Budapest, Hungary:

1. "Typhon" – 5:28
2. "Cults of the Shadow" – 5:19

Warsaw, Poland:

1. "Siren of the Woods" – 4:52

Pratteln, Switzerland:

1. "Iron Fist" – 3:33

Toulouse, France:

1. "Caffeine" – 6:03 (As Trail of Tears guests)
2. "Rise of Sodom and Gommorrah" – 6:33
3. "Cults of the Shadow" / "To Mega Therion" / "Black Funeral" / "Iron Fist" – 15:12

=== DVD: Disc 3 ===
==== Live at Wacken Open Air, 2001 ====
1. "Seven Secrets of the Sphinx"
2. "The Invocation of Naamah"
3. "Cults of the Shadow"
4. "Birth of Venus Illegitima"
5. "In the Desert of Set"
6. "The Rise of Sodom and Gomorrah"
7. "Wine of Aluqah"
8. "To Mega Therion"

==== Smecky Studios ====
Recorded in Prague, Czech Republic.

1. "Recording Choir for 'Quetzalcoath' and 'Blood of Kingu'" – 2:18
2. "Chris Follow Notes" – 0:27
3. "Harpsichord Close Up" – 0:12
4. "Recording Orchestra" – 2:33
5. "Recording solo tenor for 'Khlysti evangelist'" – 0:33

==== Sun Studio and Vor Frelsers Church ====
Recorded in Copenhagen, Denmark.

1. "Recording Hammond Organ" – 2:50
2. "Introducing the Mellotron" – 6:14
3. "Recording Mellotron" – 1:18
4. "Close Up Upon and Soundcheck of Church Organ" – 2:27
5. "Recording Church Organ" – 1:23
6. "Checking Result of Church Organ Recording" – 2:34
7. "Planning Mix" – 0:55
8. "Mixing "Son of the Sun"" – 4:10
9. "Mixing "Lemuria"" – 0:53

==== Studio report ====
Modern Art Studio, Stockholm, Sweden.

1. "Drums and Guitar" – 21:17
2. "Mandolin Test of Harmonies" – 0:35
3. "Mandolin Recordings" – 5:45
4. "Piotr Entfesselt" – 4:50
5. "Dreams of Piotrenborg" – 1:08

==== Music videos ====
All of the band's music videos to date:

1. "Pandemonic Outbreak" (1992)
2. "A Black Rose" (1993)
3. "The Beauty in Black" (1995)
4. "To Mega Therion" (1996)
5. "In the Desert of Set" (1997)
6. "Birth of Venus Illegitima" (1998)
7. "Summernight City" (2001)

The disc also contains the art movie "The Golden Embrace" (Christofer Johnsson composed music for this movie on the A'arab Zaraq - Lucid Dreaming album) including director's comments.

=== DVD: Disc 4 ===
Historical disc, which contains a collection of bootlegs from 1989 to 2001 with comments of band members.

Strömstad, Sweden, 1989:

1. "Paroxysmal Holocaust"

Of Darkness... - Rinkeby, Sweden, 1989:

1. "Asphyxiate with Fear"

Of Darkness... - Helsinki, Finland, 1990:

1. "Dark Eternity"

Of Darkness... - Huddinge, Sweden, 1992:

1. "The Return"

Beyond Sanctorum - Borås, Sweden, 1992:

1. "Enter the Depths of Eternal Darkness"

Beyond Sanctorum - Uppsala, Sweden, 1992:

1. "Pandemonic Outbreak"

Ho Drakon Ho Megas tour - Huddinge, Sweden, 1993:

1. "Dawn of Persihness"

Zug, Switzerland, 1994:

1. "Baal Reginon"

Lepaca Kliffoth separate show in Buenos Aires, Argentina, 1995:

1. "Wings of the Hydra"
2. "Melez"
3. "Symphony of the Dead"
4. "A Black Rose"
5. "Dark Princess Naamah"
6. "Let the New Day Begin"
7. "Dawn of Perishness"
8. "Black"

Theli tour - Vilnius, Lithuania, 1996:

1. "Cults of the Shadow"

Theli tour 2 - Thessaloniki, Greece, 1997:

1. "To Mega Therion"

Vovin tour - Porto, Portugal, 1998:

1. "Rise of Sodom and Gomorrah"
2. "Black Sun"

Deggial separate show in Mexico, 2000:

1. "Enter Vril-Ya"

Deggial tour - Vilnius, Lithuania, 2000:

1. "Behind the Scenes: Before a Show"
2. "Riders of Theli"
3. "The Niemann Brothers' Jam"
4. "To Mega Therion"
5. "The Wings of the Hydra"
6. "Behind the Scenes: After a Show"

Secret of the Runes tour - La Paz, Bolivia, 2001:

1. "Seawinds"
2. "Asgård"
3. "Secret of the Runes"
4. "Summernight City"
5. "Beauty in Black"

Behind the Scenes 1:

1. Budapest, Hungary and Hamburg, Germany

=== Live in Mexico City ===
Both discs contains live audio from Mexico City, 2004.

==== CD one ====
1. "Intro" – 0:27
2. "Blood of Kingu" – 5:26
3. "Uthark Runa" – 5:33
4. "Seven Secrets of the Sphinx" – 3:45
5. "Asgård" – 4:32
6. "Son of the Sun" – 5:43
7. "Invocation of Naamah" – 5:38
8. "Typhon" – 4:37
9. "Draconian Trilogy" – 6:43
10. "Flesh of the Gods" – 4:11
11. "Schwarzalbenheim" – 3:33
12. "Ginnungagap" – 5:13

==== CD two ====
1. "In Remembrance" – 6:34
2. "Wild Hunt" – 4:01
3. "The Invincible" – 5:22
4. "Melez" – 3:59
5. "Rise of Sodom and Gomorrah" – 6:52
6. "The Khlysti Evangelist" – 4:53
7. "Siren of the Woods" – 9:58
8. "Quetzalcoatl" – 3:38
9. "Wine of Aluqah" – 4:46
10. "Cults of the Shadow" – 5:19
11. "To Mega Therion" – 7:09
12. "Iron Fist" – 5:14

== Release details ==
Disc	Catalog #	Content
DVD: disc 1	NB1677-0	Live video from Mexico City 2004
DVD: disc 2	NB1689-5	Tour report 2004-2006
DVD: disc 3	NB1690-5	Live at Wacken Open Air, music videos, studio recordings, "The Golden Embrace"
DVD: disc 4	NB1691-5	Historical disc
CD: disc 1	NB1692-5	Live audio from Mexico City (part I)
CD: disc 2	NB1693-5	Live audio from Mexico City (part II)
