= Symphony Masses: Ho Drakon Ho Megas =

Studio album by Therion
- Released: April 1993
- Recorded: December 1992–January 1993; The Montezuma Studio, Stockholm, Sweden
- Genre: Death-doom
- Length: 37:34
- Languages: English, Egyptian, Hebrew, Enochian
- Labels: Megarock, Nuclear Blast
- Producers: Rex Gisslén, Therion

Therion chronology
Beyond Sanctorum (1992)	Symphony Masses: Ho Drakon Ho Megas (1993)	Lepaca Kliffoth (1995)

Alternative cover

Symphony Masses: Ho Drakon Ho Megas is the third studio album by Swedish symphonic metal band Therion, released in April 1993. The album was remastered and re-released by Nuclear Blast in 2000 as part of The Early Chapters of Revelation box-set.

== Etymology ==
In Ancient Greek, ho Drakon ho Megas (ὁ Δράκων ὁ Μέγας) means "The Great Dragon". Uttering Ho Drakon Ho Megas is typically used at the end of ceremonies and rituals when conjuring the Draconian force in the magical order Dragon Rouge, in which head of the band Christofer Johnsson used to be a member.

== Recording and production ==
Active Records, Therion's music label, decided to scale down their operations and the band was switched to the new owners, Megarock Records. The band was recording the album from December 1992 to January 1993 in The Montezuma Studio in Stockholm, Sweden, with the aid of engineer Rex Gisslén. Symphony Masses: Ho Drakon Ho Megas was released under a changed line-up; only Christofer Johnsson remained. During the Beyond Sanctorum tour, the band ran into a few personnel problems. Oskar Forss decided to leave the band; Peter Hansson quit the band after health problems. Piotr Wawrzeniuk, from the band Carbonized in which Johnsson also played, took up drumming duties. The guitar was taken up by Magnus Barthelsson, an old school friend of Johnsson's, while Andreas Wahl took up the bass.

== Songs ==
The song "A Black Rose" has been included in a Nuclear Blast DVD compilation Death… Is Just the Beginning Classics released on March 25, 2002.

== Reception ==
Professional ratings
Review scores
Source	Rating
Allmusic	4/5 stars

Symphony Masses: Ho Drakon Ho Megas mostly gained very positive reviews. It has received ratings of 4 of 5 by Allmusic with songs "Dark Princess Naamah", "Dawn of Perishness", and "Ho Drakon Ho Megas: The Dragon Throne/Fire and Ecstacy" picked by its staff, and 3.47 of 5 by the Rate Your Music community being number 473 in its 1993 ranking.

== Track listing ==
All songs were written by Christofer Johnsson.

No.	Title	Length
1.	"Baal Reginon"	2:11
2.	"Dark Princess Naamah"	4:18
3.	"A Black Rose (Covered with Tears, Blood and Ice)"	4:01
4.	"Symphoni Drakonis Inferni"	2:33
5.	"Dawn of Perishness"	5:51
6.	"The Eye of Eclipse"	5:01
7.	"The Ritual Dance of the Yezidis"	2:08
8.	"Powerdance"	3:06
9.	"Procreation of Eternity"	4:05
10.	"Ho Drakon Ho Megas": Act 1: "The Dragon Throne"; Act 2: "Fire and Ecstasy"	4:19: 1:26; 2:53
Total length:		37:34

== Personnel ==
Therion

- Christofer Johnsson – vocals, guitar, keyboards
- Magnus Barthelsson – guitar
- Andreas Wallan Wahl – bass guitar
- Piotr Wawrzeniuk – drums

Production

- Rex Gisslén – engineer, producer

Cover design

- Kristian Wåhlin – cover illustration
- Mikael P. Eriksson – cover photographs and design

== Release history ==
Region	Date	Label	Format	Catalog	Note
Sweden	April 1993	Megarock	CD	MRR 002	
U.S.	January 24, 1994	Pavement	CD, audio cassette	76962-32203	"Ho Drakon Ho Megas" song as a single track.
Japan	December 21, 1995	Toy's Factory	CD	FCK-88770	"Ho Drakon Ho Megas" song as a single track. Three bonus tracks: "Enter the Voids" – 4:18; "Symphony of the Dead (1991 demo version)" – 6:07; "Beyond Sanctorum (1991 demo version)" – 2:31
Germany	1997	Collectors Picture Disc Series	vinyl LP, picture disc	CPD 005	Limited edition of 500 copies. The second part of "Ho Drakon Ho Megas" is missing.
Europe	November 27, 2000	Nuclear Blast Europe	CD	NB 0579-2	Remastered. 3rd of 3 disc of The Early Chapters of Revelation box-set.
Russia	January 2001	IROND	CD	IROND CD 00-22	
U.S.	April 17, 2001	Nuclear Blast America	CD	NB 0579-2	Remastered. 3rd of 3 disc of The Early Chapters of Revelation box-set.
