= Beyond Sanctorum =

Studio album by Therion
- Released: January 1992
- Recorded: 1991; The Montezuma Studio, Stockholm, Sweden
- Genre: Death-doom
- Length: 49:56; 69:43 (re-edition)
- Label: Active Records; Nuclear Blast (re-edition)
- Producer: Rex Gisslén, Christofer Johnsson, Peter Hansson

Therion chronology
Of Darkness... (1991)	Beyond Sanctorum (1992)	Symphony Masses: Ho Drakon Ho Megas (1993)

Alternative cover

Beyond Sanctorum is the second studio album by Swedish symphonic metal band Therion, released in January 1992. It was re-released on 27 November 2000 under the Nuclear Blast label as a part of The Early Chapters of Revelation boxset. It contains remastered songs, as well as four bonus tracks.

== Recording and production ==
The band signed a contract with Active Records after the deal with previous label Deaf Records was signed only for one album and relations between band and label [Deaf] weren't positive. Therion began to record a second full-length album in The Montezuma Studio in 1991. Before the recordings started bass guitar player Erik Gustafsson decided to leave the band in order to return home to the U.S., but Therion continued as a trio with Peter Hansson, Oskar Forss and Christofer Johnsson filling in on bass guitar.

== Music, legacy, and lyrics ==
According to Christofer Johnsson, Beyond Sanctorum saw the band exploring "different elements", like Persian traditional music, and the inclusion of clean singing—female as well as male—to accompany increased keyboard experimentations.

Deathmetal.org notes allusions to Celtic Frost and Obituary and a technique similar to that of Godflesh in layering of melodies, an approach that would be material to future black metal and death metal bands. With Beyond Sanctorum, Therion also added vibrant yet unsentimental solos and creative bass harmony to the metal music lexicon.

The lyrics of the album diverge into the occult and introduce a Lovecraftian influence with the track "Cthulhu".

== Tour ==
After recording album, Therion started to play their first live shows in central Europe, mainly in the Netherlands and Belgium, although simultaneously band ran into a few personnel problems. Forss decided to leave the band, Hansson quit the band after health problems. The shows were played using a new lineup. Piotr Wawrzeniuk, from the band Carbonized in which Johnsson also played, took up drumming duties. The guitar was taken up by Magnus Barthelsson, an old school friend of Johnsson's, while Andreas Wahl took up the bass.

== Reception ==
Professional ratings
Review scores
Source	Rating
AllMusic	3/5 stars

Deathmetal.org considers Beyond Sanctorum a classic of early 1990s Swedish death metal, dubbing it an "endlessly inventive" album that "stimulate[s] fantasy and thought".

== Track listing ==
No.	Title	Length
1.	"Future Consciousness"	5:00
2.	"Pandemonic Outbreak"	4:21
3.	"Cthulhu"	6:12
4.	"Symphony of the Dead"	6:49
5.	"Beyond Sanctorum"	2:36
6.	"Enter the Depths of Eternal Darkness"	4:46
7.	"Illusions of Life"	3:20
8.	"The Way"	11:06
9.	"Paths"	2:03
10.	"Tyrants of the Damned"	3:43
Total length:		49:56

2000 re-release bonus tracks
No.	Title	Length
11.	"Cthulhu" (Demo)	6:10
12.	"Future Consciousness" (Demo)	5:07
13.	"Symphony of the Dead" (Demo)	6:13
14.	"Beyond Sanctorum" (Demo)	2:29
Total length:		69:43

== Personnel ==
1992 Beyond Sanctorum main lineup

Therion

- Christofer Johnsson – vocals, guitar, bass
- Peter Hansson – guitar, keyboards, bass
- Oskar Forss – drums

Guest musicians

- Magnus Eklöv – lead guitar on "Symphony of the Dead" & "Beyond Sanctorum"
- Anna Granqvist – vocals on "Symphony of the Dead" & "Paths"
- Fredriq Lundberg – vocals on "Symphony of the Dead" & "Paths"

Production

- Rex Gisslén – engineer, co-producer
- Kristian Wåhlin – cover art
