= Mats Levén =

Swedish singer (born 1964)

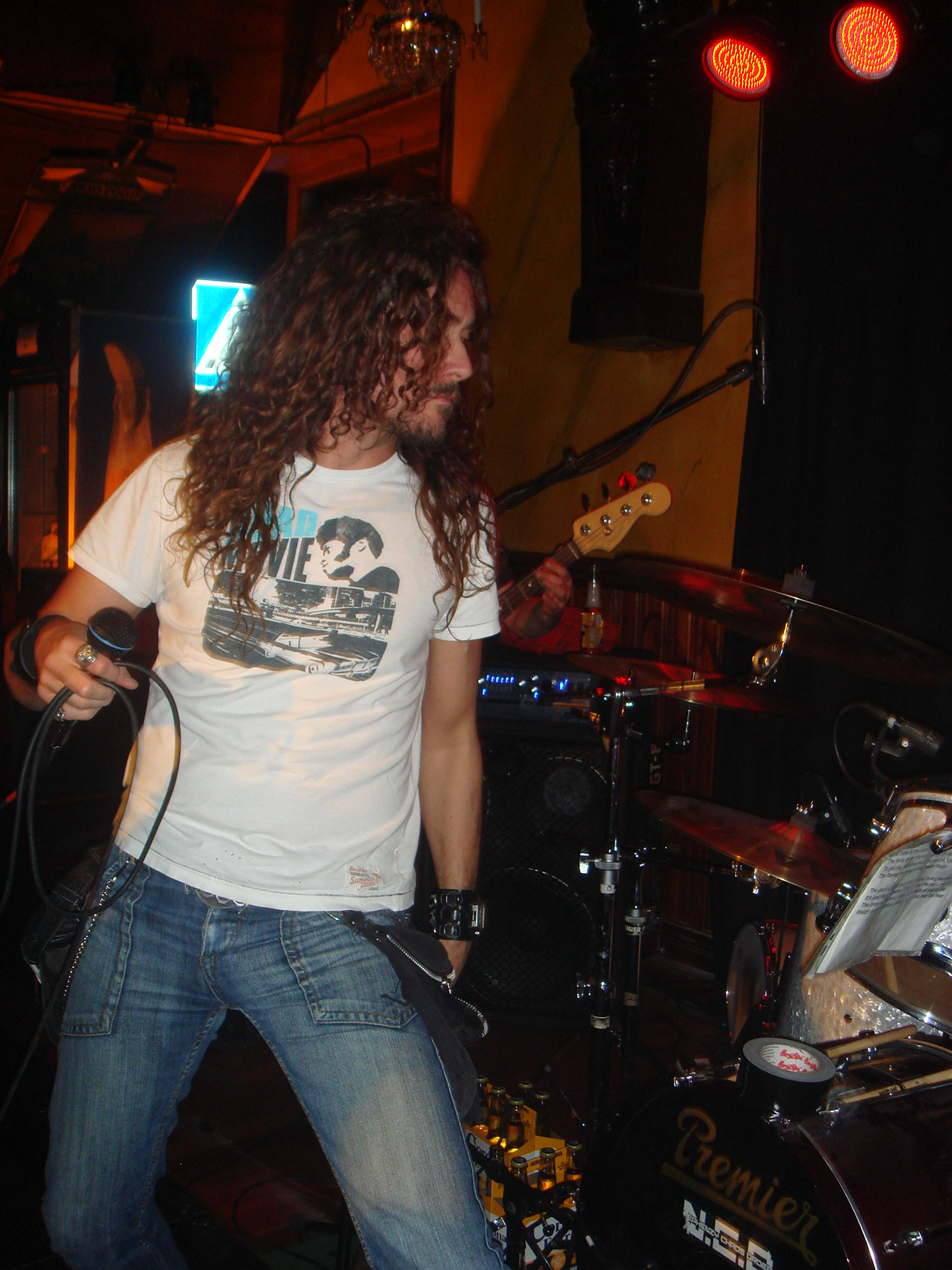

Background information
- Born: 11 September 1964 (age 62); Mölndal, Gothenburg, Sweden
- Genres: Heavy metal, hard rock, doom metal
- Occupations: Singer, songwriter
- Years active: 1986–present
- Label: Napalm Records
- Website: matsleven.com

Mats Levén (born 11 September 1964) is a Swedish singer. Some of his most notable collaborations have been with guitarist Yngwie Malmsteen, symphonic metallers Therion and doom metallers Candlemass. In 2011, due to family issues on the part of Firewind's lead singer Apollo, Levén was called in to substitute for the rest of their European tour. He also started touring with Trans-Siberian Orchestra in 2016. In 2019, he released his first solo album under the name Skyblood. In 2022, he became a member of Vandenberg which is led by the well known guitarist, Adrian Vandenberg.

== Discography ==
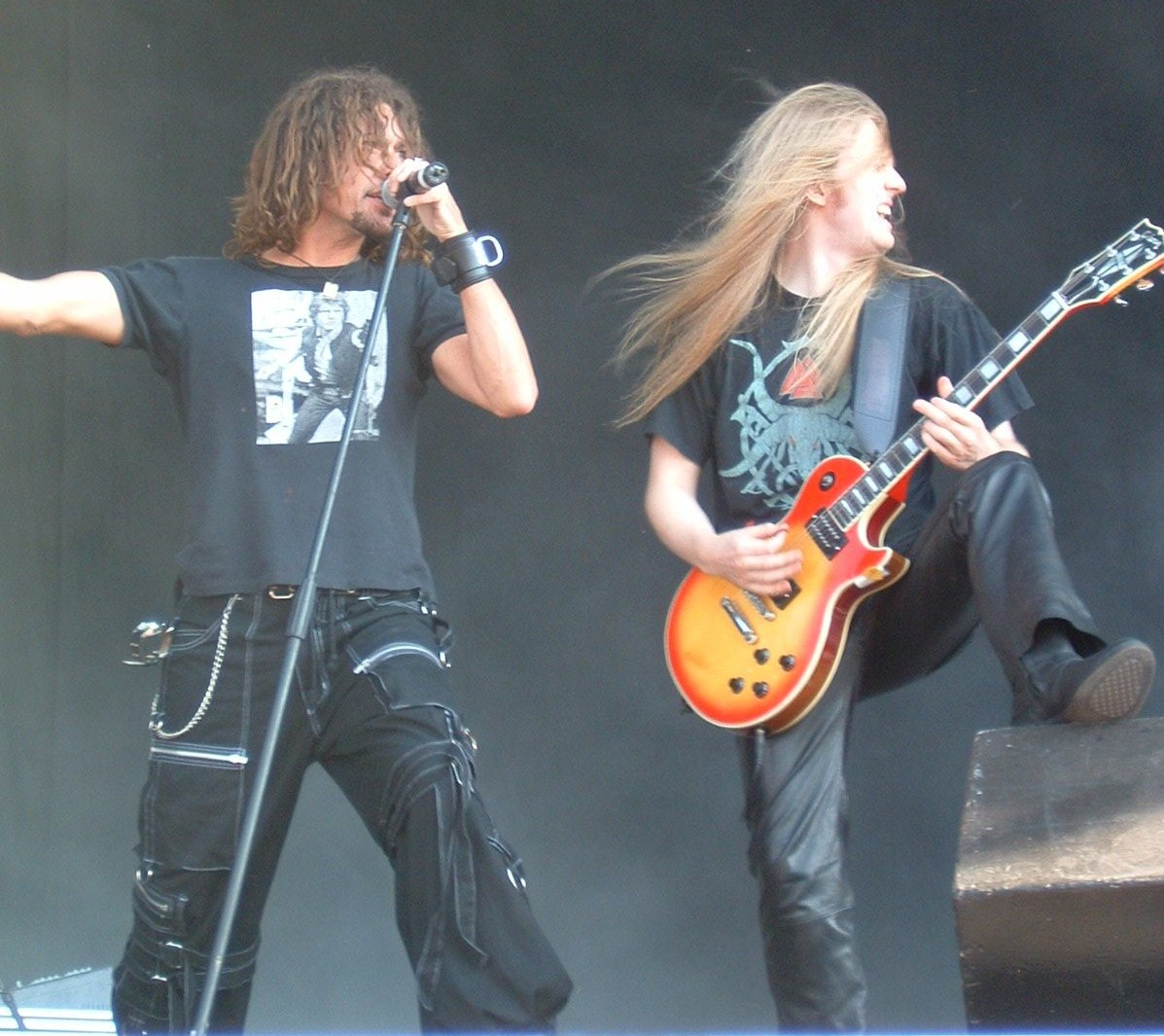
Levén (left) and Christofer Johnsson performing with Therion in 2004

=== Bands/projects/guest vocals ===
- Swedish Erotica – Swedish Erotica (1989)
- Treat – Treat (1992)
- Abstrakt Algebra – Abstrakt Algebra (1995)
- AB/CD – Cut the Crap (1995)
- Yngwie Malmsteen – Facing the Animal (1997)
- Southpaw – Southpaw (1998)
- Yngwie Malmsteen – Double Live! (1998)
- Treat – Muscle in Motion (1999 – bootleg)
- Pontus Norgren – Damage Done (2000)
- Dogface – Unleashed (2000)
- Dogface – In Control (2002)
- Krux – Krux (2002)
- At Vance – The Evil in You (2003)
- Sabbtail – Nightchurch (2004)
- Therion – Lemuria / Sirius B (2004)
- At Vance – Chained (2005)
- Swedish Erotica – Too Daze Gone (2005)
- Fatal Force – Fatal Force (2006)
- Krux – II (2006)
- Abstrakt Algebra – II (unfinished recording from 1997 – released 2006 as Bonus CD with the re-release of Candlemass album Dactylis Glomerata)
- Therion – Gothic Kabbalah (2007)
- Amaseffer – Slaves for Life (2008)
- Radiance – The Burning Sun
- Krux – He Who Sleeps Amongst the Stars (2012)
- Opera Diabolicus – 1614 (2012)
- Ludor – 777 – The New 666 (2013)
- Everdome – Afterbirth (2013)
- Dogface – Back on the Streets (2013)
- Naski Corelo – The One (2014)
- Ludor – Black X-Mas (2014)
- Hollow Haze – Memories of an Ancient Time (2013)
- Candlemass – Death Thy Lover (EP) (2016)
- Revertigo – Revertigo (2018)
- Candlemass – House of Doom (EP) (2018)
- Skyblood – Skyblood (2019)
- Vandenberg - Sin (2023)

=== Other guest vocals/tributes ===
- Various artists – A Salute to AC/DC (1999 – with AB/CD on Riff Raff)
- Various artists – Power from the North (1999 – vocals with Southpaw on Disciples of Hell)
- Various artists – The Spirit of the Black Rose (2001 – vocals with Dogface on Suicide)
- Various artists – Bajen Forever (2001 – vocals with AB/CD on Victory)
- Various artists – Blackmore's Castle (2003 – vocals with Torben Enevoldsen on Space Truckin')
- Svullo – För fet för ett omslag (2003 – vocals on 2 songs)
- Leif Edling – The Black Heart of Candlemass (2003 – vocals on 6 Abstrakt Algebra demos including White Heat Red Hot)
- Various Artists – The Sweet According to Sweden (2004 – vocals on Sweet Fanny Adams)
- Audiovision – The Calling (2005 – lead and backing vocals)
- The Bear Quartet – Eternity Now (2006 – vocals on 2 songs)
- Essence of Sorrow – Reflections of the Obscure (2007 – vocals on 5 songs)
- Nuclear Blast Allstars – Into the Light (2007 – vocals on Death Is Alive)
- Jupiter Society – First Contact // Last Warning (2008 – vocals & guitar on Cold, Rigid and Remote, vocals & drums on Solitude Unites Us, drums on 8511, vocals on Presumed Dying)
- Crucified Barbara – Til Death Do Us Party (2009 – vocals on Jennyfer and backing vocals)
- Crash the System – The Crowning (2009)
- Jupiter Society – Terraform (2009 – vocals on New Universe, Into the Dark, Siren's Song/Black Hole; guitar on Cranial Implant)
- Wisdom – Judas (2011 – vocals on Judas)
- Snowy Shaw – Snowy Shaw Is Alive! (2011 – vocals on To Mega Therion)
- Cem Köksal – Vigilante Episode One (2011 – vocals on Awakened One, Don Quixote, Stalkers in the Night)
- CrownLess – Dark Evolution (2011 – vocals on Thorns)
- Assignment – Inside of the Machine (2012)
- Nubian Rose – Mountain (2012 – vocals on Close My Eyes Forever and backing vocals)
- Jupiter Society – From Endangered to Extinct (2013 – vocals on Invasion, No Survivors, Defeat)
- Gus G – I Am the Fire (2014 – vocals on My Will Be Done, End of the Line, Blame It on Me, Eyes Wide Open)
- Dawn of Destiny – Forgotten, Enslaved, Admired, Released (2014)
- Full Nothing – Full Nothing (2015)
- Gus G – Brand New Revolution (2015 – vocals on Come Hell or High Water, If It Ends Today, The Demon Inside)
- Evil Masquerade – The Outcast Hall of Fame (2016 – vocals on Darkness (I Need You), On No Way to Broadway)
- Full Nothing – Somewhere and Nowhere (2018)

=== Backing vocals ===
- Lion's Share – Lion's Share (1995)
- Conny Bloom's Titanic Truth – Titanic Truth (1996)
- Lion's Share – Two (1997)
- Vildsvin – Iskallt begär (1997)
- Zifa – The Last Dog (1997)
- John Norum – Slipped into Tomorrow (1999)
- Various Artists – A Tribute to Grand Funk Railroad (2000 – backing vocals on Upsetter)
- Jessica Folcker – Dino (2000)
- Alfonzetti – Ready (2000)
- Little Chris – At Last... (2002)
- Adam Thompson – Reconnected (2004)
- Gypsy Rose – Gypsy Rose (2005)
- Narnia – Enter the Gate (2006)
- Shineth – 11 of 10 (2006)
- Lion's Share – Emotional Coma (2007)
- Apocalyptica – Worlds Collide (2007)
- Malison Rogue – Malison Rogue (2011)
- Crazy Lixx – Crazy Lixx (2014)
- Nubian Rose – Mental Revolution (2014)
- HammerFall – (r)Evolution (2014)
- HammerFall – Built To Last (2016)
- HammerFall – Dominion (2019)

=== DVDs/videos ===
- Yngwie Malmsteen – Live!! (1998 – VHS)
- Yngwie Malmsteen – Live!! (2000 – DVD)
- Yngwie Malmsteen – Videoclips (2000 – appears on Alone in Paradise, Like an Angel)
- Krux – Live (2003)
- Monsters of Metal – Live at Draken (2004)
- Therion – Celebrators of Becoming (2006)
- Candlemass – 20 Year Anniversary Party (2007 – appears on Black Dwarf)
- Therion – Live Gothic (2008)
- Therion – The Miskolc Experience (2009)

=== Tours ===
- Treat – 1992 German tour
- Therion – Lemuria/Sirius B Wold Tour 2004/2005 and Gothic Kabbalah European Tour 2007
- Adagio – 2010 European tour
- Cem Köksal – 2011 Turkey tour
- Firewind – 2011 EU tour
- Trans-Siberian Orchestra – 2016, 2017, 2018 US tour

=== Producer ===
- Malison Rogue – Malison Rogue (2011)
