= Live in Midgård =

Live album by Therion
- Released: 30 September 2002
- Recorded: 2001
- Genre: Symphonic metal
- Length: 1:54:02
- Label: Nuclear Blast; NB 1033-2
- Producer: Therion

Therion chronology
Secret of the Runes (2001)	Live in Midgård (2002)	Lemuria (2004)

Professional ratings
Review scores
Source	Rating
Allmusic	link

Live in Midgård is the first live album by Swedish symphonic metal band Therion. This double-disc album was recorded in Colombia, Germany and Hungary during the Secret of the Runes world tour in late 2001. Cover by Axel Jusseit and Thomas Ewerhard.

== Track listing ==
=== CD one ===
1. "Ginnungagap (Prologue)"
2. "Invocation of Naamah" (original studio version on Theli (1996))
3. "Birth of Venus Illegitima"
4. "Enter Vril-Ya"
5. "Riders of Theli"
6. "Symphony of the Dead"
7. "A Black Rose (Covered With Tears, Blood and Ice)"
8. "The Return"
9. "Baal Reginon"
10. "Flesh of the Gods"
11. "Seawinds" (Accept cover)
12. "Schwarzalbenheim"
13. "In the Desert of Set" (original studio version on Theli (1996))

=== CD two ===
1. "The Wings of the Hydra"
2. "Asgård"
3. "The Secret of the Runes (Epilogue)"
4. "The Rise of Sodom and Gomorrah"
5. "Summer Night City" (ABBA cover)
6. "The Beauty in Black"
7. "Seven Secrets of the Sphinx"
8. "Wine of Aluqah"
9. "Raven of Dispersion"
10. "To Mega Therion" (original studio version on Theli (1996))
11. "Cults of the Shadow" (original studio version on Theli (1996))

== Credits ==
- Christofer Johnsson – lead and rhythm guitar, lead vocals
- Kristian Niemann – lead and rhythm guitar
- Johan Niemann – bass guitar
- Sami Karppinen – drums

=== Guest musicians ===
- Sarah Jezebel Deva – soprano, lead vocals
- Maria Ottoson – soprano
- Johanna Mårlöv – alto
- Anders Engberg – tenor, lead vocals
- Petri Heino – baritone
- Risto Hämäläinen – baritone
