= Abaris the Hyperborean =

Legendary ancient Greek sage and priest

In Greek mythology, Abaris the Hyperborean (Ancient Greek: Ἄβαρις Ὑπερβόρειος, Ábaris Hyperbóreios), son of Seuthes (Σεύθης), was a legendary sage, healer, and priest of Apollo known to the Ancient Greeks. He was supposed to have learned his skills in his homeland of Hyperborea, which he fled during a plague. He was said to be endowed with the gift of prophecy, and along with his Scythian dress, simplicity, and honesty, he created great sensation in Greece, and was held in high esteem.

== Legend ==
According to Herodotus, he was said to have traveled around the world with an arrow symbolizing Apollo, eating no food. Heraclides Ponticus (c. 390 BC–c. 310 BC) wrote that Abaris flew on it. Plato (Charmides 158C) classes him amongst the "Thracian physicians" who practice medicine upon the soul as well as the body by means of "incantations" (ἐπωδαί, epodaí). A temple to Persephone at Sparta was attributed to Abaris by Pausanias (9.10). Alan H. Griffiths compares Abaris to Aristeas in terms of being a "shamanistic missionary and savior-figure" and notes Pindar places Abaris during the time of Croesus.

=== According to Iamblichus ===
A particularly rich trove of anecdotes is found in Iamblichus's Vita Pythagorica in three tracts.

The first tract (VP Ch. 19) tells how Abaris became initiated into Pythagoreanism. An elderly Abaris had collected gold from Greece and was returning to Hyperborea to consecrate it to Apollo. But while passing through Italy, he met Pythagoras, and immediately believed him to be Apollo himself due to "venerable indications". He gave Pythagoras a dart which he took with him from the temple. (Now he was carried by this dart during difficult parts of his journeys, passing over rivers, lakes, marshes, and mountains. With it he also expelled pestilence from Sparta and Knossos, as well as winds from other cities.) Pythagoras accepted the dart without astonishment and showed Abaris his golden thigh as evidence he had judged rightly. After showing Abaris several other signs that he was Apollo, Pythagoras exhorted him to stay and unite with him in teaching discipline to whoever they met, and also to share the gold among the Pythagoreans. Pythagoras then revealed his deeper teachings to Abaris, typically reserved for those Pythagoreans who had gone through a long and arduous initiation process. Pythagoras also taught Abaris to abandon the practice of extispicy in favor of physiology, theology, and numerology.

The second tract (VP Ch. 28) retells how Abaris became persuaded that Pythagoras was Apollo. It also claims Abaris was an "air-walker" and juxtaposes him with other ancient wonder-workers such as Empedocles an "expeller of winds" and Epimenides an "expiator". It also says all the Pythagoreans believed the legends of Aristeas, Abaris, and the others.

In the third tract (VP Ch. 32) Abaris appears in a climactic scene alongside Pythagoras at the court of the Sicilian tyrant Phalaris. The two sages discuss divine matters, and urge the obstinate tyrant towards virtue.

=== Later tradition ===
The Suda attributes a number of books to Abaris, including a volume of Scythian Oracles in dactylic hexameter, a prose theogony, a poem on the marriage of the river Hebrus, a work on purifications, and an account of Apollo's visit to the Hyperboreans. Such works, however, if they were really current in ancient times, were no more genuine than his reputed correspondence with Phalaris the tyrant. He is among the authors (= FGrHist 34) whose fragments were collected in Felix Jacoby's Fragmente der griechischen Historiker.

A more securely historical Greco-Scythian philosopher, who travelled among the Hellenes in the early sixth century, was Anacharsis.

Eighteenth century Bath architect John Wood, the Elder wrote about Abaris, and put forth the fanciful suggestion that he should be identified with King Bladud.

== Modern impact ==
- A Senior Society at Dartmouth College is named Abaris after this figure; it is one of eight Senior Societies among Dartmouth College student groups.
- Abaris is featured in songs by the band Therion; "An Arrow From The Sun" (Lemuria), "The Wand of Abaris" and "The Falling Stone" (both from Gothic Kabbalah).
- Peter Kingsley makes Abaris a key figure in his 2010 book A Story Waiting to Pierce You: Mongolia, Tibet and the Destiny of the Western World.

== Sources ==
- Herodotus, The Histories with an English translation by A. D. Godley. Cambridge. Harvard University Press. 1920. Online version at the Perseus Digital Library.
- Iamblichus, Life of Pythagoras translated by Thomas Taylor. 1818. Online version at Project Gutenberg.
- Nonnus, Dionysiaca translated by William Henry Denham Rouse (1863-1950), from the Loeb Classical Library, Cambridge, MA, Harvard University Press, 1940. Online version at the Topos Text Project.
- Plato's Charmides in the most famous passage concerning Ἄβαρις Ὑπερβόρειος.
- Plato, Platonis Opera, ed. John Burnet. Oxford University Press. 1903.
- Strabo, The Geography of Strabo. Edition by H.L. Jones. Cambridge, Mass.: Harvard University Press; London: William Heinemann, Ltd. 1924. Online version at the Perseus Digital Library.
- Entry for Abaris from the Suda.
- Kingsley, Peter - A Story Waiting To Pierce You - Mongolia, Tibet And The Destiny Of The Western World, (The Golden Sufi Center, 2010) ISBN 978-1-890350-20-8.
