= Luciferian Light Orchestra (album) =

Studio album by Luciferian Light Orchestra
- Released: 30 April 2015
- Recorded: 2014; Adulruna Studio, Sweden
- Genre: Gothic metal, hard rock
- Label: Adulruna
- Producer: Christofer Johnsson

Luciferian Light Orchestra is the first full-length album by Christofer Johnsson's Luciferian Light Orchestra project, released on 30 April 2015 in Europe The album was announced on 23 March 2015.

It is composed of songs written by founder Christofer Johnsson over many years, that he deemed too retro to fit in with the concepts of his main band Therion, and recorded in his own Adulruna Studio. The album was mixed in a retro 70s fashion by Lennart Östlund, who has previously worked with bands like ABBA and Led Zeppelin, at Polar Studios.

== Track listing ==
1. “Dr. Faust on Capri”
2. “Church of Carmel”
3. “Taste the Blood of the Altar Wine”
4. “A Black Mass in Paris”
5. “Eater of Souls”
6. “Sex With Demons”
7. “Venus in Flames”
8. “Moloch”
9. “Dante and Diabaulus”
10. (hidden bonus track - "Malenka")

=== Limited edition ===
The first edition of the album was a special release limited to 1,000 copies. These came in a luxurious digibook cover, holding a rare Gold Compact Disc with the songs.

== Personnel ==
=== Musicians ===
- Christofer Johnsson – guitar, hammond organ, keyboards, backing and lead vocals
- Mari Paul - lead-vocal
- Mina Karadzic – backing vocals

The names of the other album personnel have of yet not been released, the only details known is that in the process of recording there were involved:

- 2 drummers
- 1 bass player
- 5 guitarists
- 2 keyboard players
- 3 hammond organists
- 9 singers

and that these were a mix of current and previous Therion members, artists from other bands, and that some known and unknown people from Dragon Rouge gave a hand with backing vocals.

=== Other personnel ===
- Lennart Östlund – production mixer at Polar Studios

== Reception ==
Ahead of and after its release, the album received stellar reviews from various webzines and online reviewers, including:

- Terra Relicta (Slovenian site, English language): 9.5/10, and chosen as album of the month
- Heavy Metal (Denmark): 9/10
- La Grosse Radio (French): 9/10
- Pandemonium TV (Spanish): 90/100
- Maxazine (Dutch) 9.5/10
- Metalhead (Italian) 9.5/10
- Power Metal (German): 9/10
- Viola Noir (Russian): 10/10
- Rockway (Greek): positive

When the limited edition was put up for sale on Therion’s webshop, the first stock sold out in less than two hours.
