= Sitra Ahra (album) =

2010 album by Therion

Studio album by Therion
- Released: 17 September 2010
- Recorded: 2009–2010; Polar Studios, Stockholm
- Genre: Symphonic metal
- Length: 61:11
- Label: Nuclear Blast

Therion chronology
The Miskolc Experience (2009)	Sitra Ahra (2010)	Les Fleurs du Mal (2012)

Professional ratings
Review scores
Source	Rating
About.com	3.5/5 stars
Metal Hammer	(6/7)

Sitra Ahra is the fourteenth studio album by Swedish symphonic metal band Therion released on 17 September 2010 in Europe, and 26 October 2010 in North America. It is the first studio release since Gothic Kabbalah in 2007. The album title was announced on 4 February 2010. It refers to the qlippoth of Qabalistic lore.

== Track listing ==
No.	Title	Length
1.	"Introduction/Sitra Ahra"	5:24
2.	"Kings of Edom"	8:51
3.	"Unguentum Sabbati"	5:09
4.	"Land of Canaan"	10:32
5.	"Hellequin"	5:18
6.	"2012: Return of the Feathered Serpent"	4:16
7.	"Cú Chulainn"	4:16
8.	"Kali Yuga Part 3: Autumn of the Aeons"	3:41
9.	"The Shells Are Open"	3:44
10.	"Din"	2:37
11.	"Children of the Stone: After the Inquisition"	7:22
Total length:		61:11

== Charts ==
Chart (2010)	Peak position
Hungarian Albums Chart	5
Slovenian Albums Chart	27
Greek Albums Chart	44
French Albums Chart	51
Belgian Albums Chart	56
German Albums Chart	73
Austrian Albums Chart	75
Dutch Albums Chart	95
Mexican Albums Chart	97

== Personnel ==
- Christofer Johnsson – guitar, keyboards
- Christian Vidal - guitar
- Nalle "Grizzly" Påhlsson – bass guitar
- Johan Koleberg – drums
- Thomas Vikström – vocals
- Snowy Shaw – vocals
- Lori Lewis – vocals
- Linnéa Vikström – vocals on "Sitra Ahra", "Kings of Edom", "Land of Canaan" and "Hellequin"
- Mika "Belfagor" Hakola (Ofermod, Nefandus) - harsh vocals on "Din"
- Petter Karlsson - vocals on "2012", writer of "Hellequin"
- Marcus Jupither - vocals on "Hellequin"
- Thomas Karlsson – lyrics
- Thomas Ewerhard – cover artwork
