= Vovin =

Vovin may refer to:

- Alexander Vovin, Russian-American linguist
- Vovin (album), 1998 album by Therion
- In the Enochian language, a dragon
