= Of Darkness... =

Album by Therion

Studio album by Therion
- Released: February 1991
- Recorded: August–September 1990; Sunlight Studio, Stockholm, Sweden
- Genre: Death metal
- Length: 39:25
- Label: Deaf; DEAF 6 CD; Nuclear Blast (reedition); NB 0580
- Producer: Tomas Skogsberg, Therion

Therion chronology
Time Shall Tell (demo) (1990)	Of Darkness... (1991)	Beyond Sanctorum (1992)

Alternative cover
- The Early Chapters of Revelation reedition cover

Of Darkness… is the debut studio album by Swedish symphonic metal band Therion, released in February 1991. It contains songs written in the early years of the band, during the 1980s. The album is indicated by the band itself as an end of its first era.

The album was re-released on 27 November 2000 under Nuclear Blast label as a part of The Early Chapters of Revelation box-set. It contains remastered songs, as well as four bonus tracks.

== Recording and production ==
After releasing the third demo record Time Shall Tell EP in 1990, Therion got attention from the British label Deaf Records, a subsidiary of Peaceville Records, and signed the band's first contract. Of Darkness... was recorded in Swedish studio Sunlight in Stockholm from August to September 1990 and released in February 1991. The initial line-up has not been changed since its last production. The album was produced by Tomas Skogsberg and the band itself.

The title track and the song "Dark Eternity" were not used from the recording session, but were instead taken from the 1990 EP recordings.

== Songs, lyrical themes, and influences ==
Of Darkness... consists of songs Christofer Johnsson had written in the years of 1987–1989, many of which were available on the band's demo recordings. Musically, "Of Darkness…" could be described as a typical death metal release, though elements of thrash metal are apparent as well.

Unlike later albums, lyrically, many tracks on the album focus on political and social issues.

2000 re-release album contains original remastered songs, and four bonus tracks songs. Two of them are the 1990 versions from the "Time Shall Tell" EP. The other two are the unreleased versions from the "Of Darkness…" recording sessions.

== Reception ==
Professional ratings
Review scores
Source	Rating
Allmusic	2.5/5 stars

The album reviews were mixed. Of Darkness… received a medium rating 2.5 of 5 at Allmusic with "Morbid Reality" and "Megalomania" songs picked by its staff, and 3.02 of 5 at the Rate Your Music community being only number 925 in its 1991 ranking.

== Track listing ==
All tracks were written and composed by Christofer Johnsson.

No.	Title	Length
1.	"The Return"	5:15
2.	"Asphyxiate with Fear"	4:00
3.	"Morbid Reality"	6:05
4.	"Megalomania"	4:10
5.	"A Suburb to Hell"	4:47
6.	"Genocidal Raids"	5:15
7.	"Time Shall Tell"	5:07
8.	"Dark Eternity"	4:45
Total length:		39:25

2000 re-release bonus tracks
No.	Title	Length
9.	"A Suburb to Hell" (demo version)	5:19
10.	"Asphyxiate with Fear" (demo version)	4:41
11.	"Time Shall Tell" (unreleased version)	4:06
12.	"Dark Eternity" (unreleased version)	4:19
Total length:		57:50

== Personnel ==
Therion

- Christofer Johnsson – vocals, rhythm guitar
- Peter Hansson – lead guitar
- Oskar Forss – drums
- Erik Gustafsson – bass guitar

Production

- Tomas Skogsberg – engineer, producer
- Gary Querns – cover art (based on Johan Losand and Rikard Olund's work)

== Samples ==
Asphyxiate with Fear

== See also ==
- Scandinavian death metal
