= Revertigo (band) =

Swedish musical duo

- Origin: Stockholm, Sweden
- Genres: Hard rock, glam metal
- Years active: 2016-present
- Label: Frontiers
- Members: Mats Levén; Anders Wikström

Revertigo is a Swedish rock duo consisting of singer Mats Levén, who is known for his work with heavy metal bands such as Candlemass and Therion, and Treat guitarist Anders Wikström. The group was formed in 2016, and they produced a three-song demo tape that led to the band being signed by Frontiers Records. Their debut album was released on 23 February, 2018 through Frontiers.

== Members ==
- Mats Levén – vocals
- Anders Wikström – guitar

== Discography ==
- Revertigo (2018, Frontiers)
