= Lepaca Kliffoth =

Studio album by Therion
- Released: 4 April 1995
- Recorded: 1994; Music Lab Studio, Berlin
- Genre: Death-doom, symphonic metal
- Length: 48:38
- Label: Megarock Records; MRRCD 029; Nuclear Blast (reedition); NB 127-2; Digipack: NB 216-2
- Producer: Christofer Johnsson

Therion chronology
Symphony Masses: Ho Drakon Ho Megas (1993)	Lepaca Kliffoth (1995)	Theli (1996)

Lepaca Kliffoth is the fourth studio album by Swedish symphonic metal band Therion. The title refers to the qlippoth. Stylistically, it retains the aggressive riffing and sheds the harsh growls of the band's previous death metal output, while also incorporating more elements of traditional heavy metal and more pronounced gothic and symphonic elements, often leading to this album being viewed as a transitional album in Therion's discography.

== Reception ==
For Metal Storm, the album "stands between the band's more Death roots and later symphonic grandiosity" and "turns out to be a fine piece of work, the great songwriting, mixed with Arabic-influenced keyboards is remarkable, and those mysterious lyrics just add more charm".

Deathmetal.org states that Lepaca Kliffoth "should be avoided by the serious listener" because the structural genius of earlier Therion albums is here only available as distracting ornamentation, rendering it "very cheesy radio hard rock".

== Track listing ==
Lyrics and Music by Christofer Johnsson, except where stated.

No.	Title	Lyrics	Music	Length
1.	"The Wings of the Hydra"			3:33
2.	"Melez"	Christofer Johnsson, Thomas Karlsson		4:07
3.	"Arrival of the Darkest Queen"			0:54
4.	"The Beauty in Black"	Thomas Karlsson		3:12
5.	"Riders of Theli"		Fredrik Isaksson	2:51
6.	"Black"		Christofer Johnsson, Piotr Wawrzeniuk	5:02
7.	"Darkness Eve"			5:19
8.	"Sorrows of the Moon" (Celtic Frost cover)		Martin Eric Ain	3:26
9.	"Let the New Day Begin"		Christofer Johnsson, Piotr Wawrzeniuk	3:35
10.	"Lepaca Kliffoth"	Thomas Karlsson		4:26
11.	"Evocation of Vovin"			4:52
Total length:				48:38

Japanese edition bonus track
No.	Title	Length
12.	"The Veil of Golden Spheres"	2:59
Total length:		51:37

Digipack edition re-release bonus tracks
No.	Title	Length
12.	"Enter the Voids"	4:54
13.	"The Veil of Golden Spheres"	2:59
Total length:		56:31

- "Enter the Voids" was previously released before only on the original LP version of "Lepaca Kliffoth"
- The first release of digipack from November 15, 1996, has a black tray and missing #8 track "Sorrows of the Moon" on the back cover. The second release (ca. 1999) has a clear tray, fixed track listing, and additional pictures on the inside cover.

== Credits ==
- Christofer Johnsson - guitar, vocals and keyboards
- Piotr Wawrzeniuk - drums
- Fredrik Isaksson - bass guitar
- Harris Johns - engineering, mixing (except "Darkness Eve")

=== Guest musicians ===
- Hans Groning - bass-baritone vocals ("The Beauty in Black", "Evocation of Vovin")
- Claudia Maria Mokri - soprano vocals ("The Beauty in Black", "Evocation of Vovin", "Black")
- Harris Johns - lead guitar (first part of solo in "The Beauty in Black")
- "Jan" - additional vocals (chorus parts of "Wings of the Hydra", "Sorrows of the Moon")

== Single ==
- "The Beauty in Black"

== Cover ==
Lepaca Kliffoth inlay

=== Credits ===
- Album cover and design made by Holmen & Ungman Productions.
- Original painting by Kristian Wåhlin.
- Tom Eriksen is an album's art director. He is also responsible for cover's computer treatments.
