= Secret of the Runes =

Secret of the Runes may refer to:

- The Secret of the Runes, a book by Guido von List
- Secret of the Runes (album), an album by Swedish symphonic metal band Therion
