= Theli (album) =

Studio album by Therion
- Released: August 9, 1996
- Recorded: January – March 1996
- Studio: Impuls Studio (Hamburg, Germany)
- Genre: Symphonic metal
- Length: 51:29
- Label: Nuclear Blast; NB 179-2
- Producer: Jan Peter Genkel, Gottfried Koch, Therion

Therion chronology
Lepaca Kliffoth (1995)	Theli (1996)	A'arab Zaraq – Lucid Dreaming (1997)

Professional ratings
Review scores
Source	Rating
Allmusic	link

Theli is the fifth studio album by Swedish symphonic metal band Therion. This was the last album on which Christofer Johnsson sang until 2004's Lemuria. A music video was filmed for the song "To Mega Therion". The title of the track is a Greek reference to The Beast in the Christian Book of Revelation. The song appears in the shockumentary film Traces of Death IV.

== Track listing ==
No.	Title	Length
1.	"Preludium" (Instrumental)	1:43
2.	"To Mega Therion"	6:34
3.	"Cults of the Shadow"	5:14
4.	"In the Desert of Set"	5:29
5.	"Interludium" (Instrumental)	1:47
6.	"Nightside of Eden"	7:31
7.	"Opus Eclipse" (Instrumental)	3:41
8.	"Invocation of Naamah"	5:31
9.	"The Siren of the Woods"	9:55
10.	"Grand Finale / Postludium" (Instrumental)	4:04
Total length:		51:29

Japanese edition bonus tracks
No.	Title	Length
11.	"In Remembrance"	6:05
12.	"Black Fairy" (European Metal Version)	5:55
13.	"Fly to the Rainbow" (Scorpions cover)	8:15
Total length:		71:44

== Credits ==
=== Therion line-up ===
- Christofer Johnsson – guitar, vocals, keyboards
- Piotr Wawrzeniuk – drums, vocals
- Lars Rosenberg – bass guitar
- Jonas Mellberg – guitar, acoustic guitar, keyboards

=== Guest musicians ===
- Dan Swanö – vocals
- Jan Peter Genkel – grand piano, keyboards, programming
- Gottfried Koch – keyboards, programming

=== North German Radio Choir ===
- Raphaela Mayhaus – soprano
- Bettina Stumm – soprano
- Ursula Ritters – alto
- Ergin Onat – tenor
- Joachim Gebhardt – bass
- Klaus Bulow – bass

=== Siren Choir ===
- Anja Krenz – solo soprano
- Constanze Arens – soprano
- Riekje Weber – alto
- Stephan Gade – tenor
- Axel Patz – solo bass-baritone

== Single ==
- "The Siren of the Woods"

== Cover design ==
Cover was made by Peter Grøn.
