= Oskar Forss =

- Genres: Death metal
- Occupation: Drummer

Oskar Forss was a co-founder and during the years of 1987–1992 drummer of Swedish symphonic metal band Therion.

== Music career ==
Oskar Forss was a drummer of a pre-Therion band called Blitzkrieg. Due to personal problems with Forss, band decided to split up in ca. March 1988 but soon reformed having line-up without Oskar. Forss back to band in the same year and music group changed its name to Megatherion, and shortly after to Therion. He recorded with the band all three demos and two first albums—Of Darkness... and Beyond Sanctorum. After that recording, Forss was expecting his second child and decided to leave the band.

== Discography ==
- Therion – Paroxysmal Holocaust (1989)
- Therion – Beyond the Darkest Veils of Inner Wickedness (1989)
- Therion – Time Shall Tell (1990)
- Therion – Of Darkness... (1991)
- Therion – Beyond Sanctorum (1992)
