= Live Gothic =

Live album by Therion
- Released: 25 July 2008
- Recorded: Warsaw, Poland, 14 February 2007
- Genre: Symphonic metal
- Label: Nuclear Blast

Therion chronology
Gothic Kabbalah (2007)	Live Gothic (2008)	The Miskolc Experience (2009)

Professional ratings
Review scores
Source	Rating
Terrorizer (Nov 2008)	9/10 stars

Live Gothic is the third live album by Swedish symphonic metal band Therion, released on 25 July 2008 and recorded in Poland. The album is released on two CDs and one DVD.

== CD track list ==
=== Disc One ===
1. "Der Mitternachtslöwe"
2. "Schwarzalbenheim"
3. "The Blood of Kingu"
4. "The Falling Stone"
5. "An Arrow From the Sun"
6. "Deggial"
7. "Wine of Aluqah"
8. "The Perennial Sophia"
9. "The Son of the Sun"
10. "Son of the Staves of Time"
11. "Birth of Venus Illegitima"
12. "Tuna 1613"
13. "Drum Solo"
14. "Muspelheim"

Running time: 68 min

=== Disc Two ===
1. "Rise of Sodom and Gomorrah"
2. "Ginnungagap"
3. "Grand Finale"
4. "Lemuria"
5. "The Wand of Abaris"
6. "Nightside of Eden"
7. "To Mega Therion"
8. "Thor (The Powerhead) : Manowar cover"

Running time: 51 min

== DVD track list ==
=== Show ===
1. "Der Mitternachtslöwe"
2. "Schwarzalbenheim"
3. "The Blood of Kingu"
4. "The Falling Stone"
5. "An Arrow From the Sun"
6. "Deggial"
7. "Wine of Aluqah"
8. "The Perennial Sophia"
9. "The Son of the Sun"
10. "Son of the Staves of Time"
11. "Birth of Venus Illegitima"
12. "Tuna 1613"
13. "Drum Solo"
14. "Muspelheim"
15. "Rise of Sodom and Gomorrah"
16. "Ginnungagap"
17. "Grand Finale"
18. "Lemuria"
19. "The Wand of Abaris"
20. "Nightside of Eden"
21. "To Mega Therion"
22. "Thor (The Powerhead) : Manowar cover"

=== Bonus video ===
"Drum Battle in Holland"

== Vinyl release ==
Live Gothic has been also released as limited edition of four LP vinyl (33⅓ rpm), gatefold cover and it has been released in 500 hand-numbered copies.

== Personnel ==
- Christofer Johnsson – guitar
- Kristian Niemann – lead and rhythm guitars
- Johan Niemann – bass guitar
- Petter Karlsson – drums, additional vocals on "Thor (The Powerhead)"
- Mats Levén – vocals, additional percussion on "Ginnungagap"
- Snowy Shaw – vocals, additional percussion on "Ginnungagap"
- Katarina Lilja – vocals
- Lori Lewis - vocals

== Charts ==
Chart (2001)	Peak position
Dutch Albums (Album Top 100)	98
German Albums (Offizielle Top 100)	99
