= Uthark theory =

The Uthark theory about the runes holds that the rune row is a cipher, and that one can understand its meaning by placing the first rune, "F", last, resulting in an ”Uthark” instead of the traditional "Futhark" order. It originated in the 1930s with the work of philologist Sigurd Agrell (1881–1937), a professor at Lund University, Sweden. His suggestion has no support in historical sources and was never accepted in mainstream runic studies, but it has found proponents in occult, esoteric circles and in popular culture.

Agrell articulated the bulk of his theory in his 1932 book Die spätantike Alphabet-Mystik und die Runenreihe [The Alphabet-mysticism of late antiquity and the sequence of the runes]. Occultist Kenneth Meadows promoted it in his 1995 book Rune Power. Thomas Karlsson, founder of the magical order Dragon Rouge, then published the first monograph dedicated to the subject after Agrell's work of 1932: Uthark: Nightside of the Runes in 2002.
