= Sirius B (album) =

Studio album by Therion
- Released: 24 May 2004
- Recorded: 2003
- Genre: Symphonic metal
- Length: 56:58
- Labels: Nuclear Blast; NB 1252-2; Digipack: NB 1295-0
- Producers: Lars Nissen, Therion

Therion chronology
Lemuria (2004)	Sirius B (2004)	Gothic Kabbalah (2007)

Sirius B is the twelfth studio album by Swedish symphonic metal band Therion. The album title refers to the star Sirius B. It was released simultaneously with Lemuria. The cover artwork was by Thomas Ewerhard.

== Reception ==
Professional ratings
Review scores
Source	Rating
AllMusic	link

== Track listing ==
No.	Title	Length
1.	"The Blood of Kingu"	5:45
2.	"Son of the Sun"	5:35
3.	"The Khlysti Evangelist"	5:38
4.	"Dark Venus Persephone"	4:02
5.	"Kali Yuga, Part 1"	3:27
6.	"Kali Yuga, Part 2"	5:48
7.	"The Wondrous World of Punt"	7:19
8.	"Melek Taus"	5:31
9.	"Call of Dagon"	4:14
10.	"Sirius B"	3:43
11.	"Voyage of Gurdjieff (The Fourth Way)"	5:56
Total length:		56:58

== Development and lyrical themes ==
In an interview with Global Domination, Johnsson said that the album title is a reference to the twin star to the ordinary Sirius A.

The album makes references to ancient culture and mythology:

- Kingu was a monster in Sumerian mythology. According to the Enûma Elish, all human beings were created from his blood after he was killed by Marduk.
- Son of the Sun (Egyptian hieroglyphs: 𓅭𓇳, “Son of Ra”) was the title of Pharaoh Akhenaten, who preferred to worship Aton, god of the Sun, to the detriment of all other gods. His reign was unsuccessful, and people believed that the other forsaken gods had cursed him.
- Khlysti was a controversial Christian sect in Russia. Grigory Rasputin, the major character of the song, is believed to have been a member.
- Persephone is the wife of Hades, the god of the dead in Greek mythology.
- Kali Yuga in Hinduism is a dark age of suffering, the final era before the end of the world.
- Land of Punt was a mysterious lost kingdom in ancient east Africa.
- Melek Taus is the supreme deity of the Yazidi, commonly depicted in the form of a peacock.
- Dagon is an ancient Semitic god of the sea. He appears in many H. P. Lovecraft books of Cthulhu Mythos.
- Georgy Gurdzhiev was an Armenian mystic philosopher and traveller, an expert in Yazidi culture.

== Personnel ==
- Christofer Johnsson – rhythm guitar, mandolin ("The Wondrous World of Punt"), classical and choir arrangements
- Kristian Niemann – lead and rhythm guitar, acoustic guitar, mandolin ("The Wondrous World of Punt")
- Johan Niemann – bass guitar, mandolin ("The Wondrous World of Punt")

Guest musicians

- Richard Evensand – drums, gong ("Kali Yuga part 2")
- Mats Levén – lead vocals ("The Blood of Kingu", "The Khlysti Evangelist", "Kali Yuga part 2")
- Piotr Wawrzeniuk – lead vocals ("Dark Venus Persephone", "Kali Yuga part 1", "Melek Taus")
- Anna–Maria Krawe – lead and backing vocals
- Steen Rasmussen – Hammond organ
- Lars Sømod Jensen – church organ
- Orchestra: The City of Prague Philharmonic Orchestra (conducted by Adam Klemens and Mario Klemens)
- Choir: Kühn Mixed Choir (conducted by Mario Klemens)

== Charts ==
Chart (2004)	Peak position
Hungarian Albums (MAHASZ)	34
