= A'arab Zaraq – Lucid Dreaming =

Studio album by Therion
- Released: May 16, 1997
- Recorded: 1996
- Genre: Symphonic metal
- Length: 71:25
- Label: Nuclear Blast; NB 249-2
- Producer: Peter Tägtgren, Jan Peter Genkel, Gottfried Koch, Therion

Therion chronology
Theli (1996)	A'arab Zaraq – Lucid Dreaming (1997)	Vovin (1998)

A'arab Zaraq – Lucid Dreaming is the sixth studio album by Swedish symphonic metal band Therion released in 1997, when the band celebrated their tenth anniversary. The record contains a few unused songs from Theli, a few cover songs the band had made, plus a full soundtrack Christofer Johnsson had made independently for a 1996 short film directed by Per Albinsson, The Golden Embrace.

== Track listing ==
No.	Title	Length
1.	"In Remembrance"	6:28
2.	"Black Fairy"	5:56
3.	"Fly to the Rainbow" (Scorpions cover)	8:14
4.	"Children of the Damned" (Iron Maiden cover)	4:30
5.	"Under Jolly Roger" (Running Wild cover)	4:36
6.	"Symphony of the Dead" (Shortened, Instrumental version)	3:39
7.	"Here Comes the Tears" (Judas Priest cover)	3:21

Therion modified (with added guitars, bass, and drums) versions from the soundtrack to The Golden Embrace
No.	Title	Length
8.	"Enter Transcendental Sleep"	4:22
9.	"The Quiet Desert"	3:52
10.	"Down the Qliphothic Tunnel"	2:53
11.	"Up to Netzach / Floating Back"	4:08

The Golden Embrace soundtrack
No.	Title	Length
12.	"The Fall Into Eclipse" (Instrumental)	3:44
13.	"Enter Transcendental Sleep II" (Instrumental)	3:51
14.	"The Gates to A'Arab Zaraq Are Open" (Instrumental)	1:25
15.	"The Quiet Desert II" (Instrumental)	3:51
16.	"Down the Qliphothic Tunnel II" (Instrumental)	2:53
17.	"Up to Netzach II" (Instrumental)	2:53
18.	"Floating Back II" (Instrumental)	0:49

== Credits ==
- Christofer Johnsson – guitar, bass guitar, keyboards, Hammond organ, grand piano
- Piotr Wawrzeniuk – drums, Vocals
- Jonas Mellberg – guitar, keyboards ("In Remembrance")
- Lars Rosenberg – bass guitar

=== Guest musicians ===
- Dan Swanö – vocals ("In Remembrance", "Black Fairy")
- Tobias Sidegard – vocals ("Under Jolly Roger")
- Peter Tägtgren – second and fourth lead guitar ("Under Jolly Roger")
- Gottfried Koch – acoustic guitar ("Here Comes the Tears", "Up to Netzach"), grand piano

=== Choir and solo opera ===
- Bettina Stumm – soprano
- Raphaela Mayhaus – soprano
- Marie-Therese Kubel – alto
- Ergin Onat – tenor
- Klaus Bulow – bass
- Joachim Gebhardt – bass

== Cover design ==
Art, design, photo and layout are made by Peter Grøn.

== Charts ==
Chart (1997)	Peak position
German Albums (Offizielle Top 100)	98
