= Les Fleurs du Mal (Therion album) =

- Cover art by Saturno Buttò

Studio album by Therion
- Released: 28 September 2012
- Recorded: 2011–2012
- Studios: Adulruna Studio, Sweden
- Genres: Symphonic metal, ye-ye
- Length: 47:56
- Language: French
- Label: Self-publishing
- Producer: Christofer Johnsson

Therion chronology
Sitra Ahra (2010)	Les Fleurs du Mal (2012)	Beloved Antichrist (2018)

Tour album CD cover

Les Fleurs du Mal is the fifteenth studio album by Swedish symphonic metal band Therion. It is a cover album that was released on 28 September 2012 to celebrate the 25th anniversary of the band. Named after the 1857 volume of French poetry, Les Fleurs du mal, by Charles Baudelaire, the album is fully sung in French language. It consist of metal cover versions of French pop songs from 1960s and 1970s, mostly from the ye-ye genre.

== Production ==
The album was financed by Christofer Johnsson who considers the album a part of an art project. It was made available for pre-order at Therion's webstore on 2 September 2012. Johnsson announced that the version sold at concerts with a different cover, would include a bonus track and a poster, and that his "aim is to sign and personally dedicate every single one of them at the shows".

== Track listing ==
No.	Title	Writer(s)	Original artist	Length
1.	"Poupée de cire, poupée de son" ("Wax Doll, Rag Doll")	Serge Gainsbourg	France Gall (1965)	2:51
2.	"Une fleur dans le cœur" ("A Flower in the Heart")	Christophe Schaeffer, Pawson/Chambers	Victoire Scott (1968)	3:03
3.	"Initials B.B." (B.B. is for Brigitte Bardot)	Serge Gainsbourg	Serge Gainsbourg (1968)	3:44
4.	"Mon amour, mon ami" ("My Love, my Friend")	Eddy Marnay, André Popp	Marie Laforêt (1967)	4:35
5.	"Polichinelle" ("Pulcinella")	Pierre Saka, Jean Bernard	France Gall (1967)	2:28
6.	"La Maritza" ("The Maritsa")	Pierre Delanoë, Jean Renard	Sylvie Vartan (1968)	3:54
7.	"Sœur Angélique" ("Sister Angelica")	Michel Rivgauche, Georges Liferman	Annie Philippe (1966)	3:05
8.	"Dis-moi poupée" ("Tell me Doll")	Jean Albertini, Johnny Rech	Isabelle (1967)	3:24
9.	"Lilith"	Léonie Lousseau, Karl Heinz Schäfer	Léonie (1972)	2:30
10.	"En Alabama" ("In Alabama")	Sébastien Poitrenaud, Jean-Claude Vannier	Léonie (1971)	2:39
11.	"Wahala Manitou"	Étienne Roda-Gil, Christophe	Léonie (1971)	2:34
12.	"Je n’ai besoin que de tendresse" (I Need Only Tenderness")	Claire Dixon, Daniel Faure	Claire Dixon 1967	2:14
13.	"La Licorne d’or" ("The Gold Unicorn")	Christian Turban, Michel Bernholc	Victoire Scott (1968)	2:45
14.	"J’ai le mal de toi" ("I Miss You")	Michaële/Georges Costa, Gabriel Yared	Betty Mars (1974)	2:51
15.	"Poupée de cire, poupée de son" ("Wax Doll, Rag Doll")	Serge Gainsbourg	France Gall (1965)	2:31
Total length:				45:16

Bonus track
No.	Title	Writer(s)	Original artist	Length
16.	"Les Sucettes" ("The Lollipops")	Serge Gainsbourg	France Gall 1966	2:40
Total length:				47:56

== Personnel ==
The album was recorded by the following artists:

Band

- Lori Lewis - soprano and main vocals
- Thomas Vikström - tenor and main vocals
- Christofer Johnsson - rhythm guitars, synthesizers, Hammond organ and programming, of tubular bells, timpani, clarinet, double bass and harp. Arrangements, audio engineer and record producer.
- Christian Vidal - solo guitars, electric sitar
- Nalle "Grizzly" Påhlsson – 4 and 8 string bass guitars
- Johan Kullberg - drums

Guest musicians

- Snowy Shaw - vocals in "Initials B.B." and "Dis-moi Poupee"
- Mari Paul - vocals on "Mon Amour, Mon Ami"
- Johanna Najla - vocals on "Initials B.B."
- Mattias Olsson - synthesizers, mellotron and percussion on "En Alabama", "Mon Amour, Mon Ami" and "Lilith"
- Mattias Torrel - acoustic guitars on "Mon Amour, Mon Ami" and "La Licorne D'or"
- Stefan Jernståhl - accordion on "Wahala Manitou"
- Violin

- Anders Åkered
- Fredrik Syberg
- Hanna Ekström
- Isa Holmesund
- Lars Wehlin
- Natalia Migdal

- Cello

- Anna Manell
- Pär Lindqvist

- Horn

- Eva-Tea Lundberg
- Ida Freji
- Johan Ahlin
- Magnus Wretblad

- Trombone

- Kristoffer Siggstedt
- Magnus Werner
- Staffan Findin

- Erik Rodell – oboe
- Rolf Pilotti – flute
- Johan Norin – trumpet
