= Gothic Kabbalah =

Album by Therion

Studio album by Therion
- Released: 12 January 2007
- Recorded: July–September 2006; Stockholm, Sweden
- Genres: Symphonic gothic metal, progressive metal
- Length: 83:29
- Labels: Nuclear Blast; NB 1780-0
- Producer: Stefan Glaumann

Therion chronology
Sirius B (2004)	Gothic Kabbalah (2007)	Live Gothic (2008)

Gothic Kabbalah is the thirteenth studio album by Swedish symphonic metal band Therion. It was released in Europe on 12 January 2007. The album was mixed by Stefan Glaumann, who also contributed to bands such as Rammstein, Evergrey, Europe and Def Leppard. The main line-up has been slightly changed since previous studio albums (Lemuria and Sirius B): Petter Karlsson returned to play drums, having already played with the band during Lemuria / Sirius B tour during the period of 2004–2006. Since Christofer Johnsson announced in 2006 he is retiring from singing, vocals on Gothic Kabbalah were performed by Mats Levén, as well as Snowy Shaw and three female singers: Katarina Lilja, Anna Nyhlin and Hannah Holgersson.

The album is based on concepts from the life of 17th-century esoteric scholar Johannes Bureus.

== Track listing ==
All lyrics by Thomas Karlsson. Music as indicated:

Disc one
No.	Title	Music	Length
1.	"Der Mitternachtslöwe"	Christofer Johnsson, Mats Levén	5:38
2.	"Gothic Kabbalah"	Petter Karlsson	4:33
3.	"The Perennial Sophia"	Johan Niemann, Levén, P. Karlsson	4:54
4.	"Wisdom and the Cage"	Kristian Niemann, P. Karlsson	5:01
5.	"Son of the Staves of Time"	Levén	4:47
6.	"Tuna 1613"	P. Karlsson, Snowy Shaw	4:23
7.	"Trul"	P. Karlsson	5:11
8.	"Close Up the Streams"	Johnsson, Levén	3:55

Disc two
No.	Title	Music	Length
1.	"The Wand of Abaris"	Johnsson, K. Niemann	5:51
2.	"Three Treasures"	Johnsson	5:20
3.	"Path to Arcady"	K. Niemann, P. Karlsson	3:54
4.	"TOF – The Trinity"	K. Niemann, Levén, P. Karlsson	6:18
5.	"Chain of Minerva"	J. Niemann, Levén, P. Karlsson	5:21
6.	"The Falling Stone"	P. Karlsson	4:46
7.	"Adulruna Rediviva"	Johnsson, K. Niemann	13:37
8.	"Seven Secrets Of The Sphinx (Live)" (Bonus Track)		3:48
9.	"To Mega Therion (Live)" (Bonus Track)		6:45

== Vinyl release ==
Gothic Kabbalah has been also released as limited edition double LP vinyl (180 gram; 33⅓ rpm). It features colored vinyl, gatefold cover and it has been released in 1000 hand-numbered copies.

Vinyl release track listing

Side A

1. "Der Mitternachtslöwe"
2. "Gothic Kabbalah"
3. "The Perennial Sophia"
4. "Wisdom and the Cage"

Side B

1. "Son of the Staves of Time"
2. "Tuna 1613"
3. "Trul"
4. "Close Up the Streams"

Side C

1. "The Wand of Abaris"
2. "Three Treasures"
3. "Path to Arcady"
4. "TOF – The Trinity"

Side D

1. "Chain of Minerva"
2. "The Falling Stone"
3. "Adulruna Rediviva"

== Reception ==
Professional ratings
Review scores
Source	Rating
AllMusic	link
PopMatters	link
Chronicles of Chaos	link

The album has received generally good reviews from critics, including Chronicles of Chaos and AllMusic hailing it as "the first truly great rock opera of the 21st century".

The album was the band's first to enter the Swedish Albums Chart.

== Chart positions ==
Chart (2007)	Peak position
Greece	5
Poland	21
Sweden	26
Netherlands	55
France	58
Germany	59
Switzerland	73
Hungary	74
Belgium	84
IndieHQ Independent Sales Chart	156

== Personnel ==
- Christofer Johnsson – keyboards, programming, guitar
- Kristian Niemann – lead and rhythm guitars, keyboards
- Johan Niemann – bass guitar, guitar, acoustic guitar
- Petter Karlsson – drums, guitar, keyboards, solo ("Chain of Minerva", "T.O.F. - The Trinity") and choral vocals, percussion
- Mats Levén – lead vocals ("Der Mitternachtslöwe" (choir), "Gothic Kabbalah", "Perennial Sophia", "Son of the Staves of Time", "Close up the Streams", "Three Treasures", "T.O.F. - Trinity", "Adulruna Rediviva"), guitar

=== Guest musicians ===
- Snowy Shaw – lead vocals ("Der Mitternachtslöwe" (choir), "Perennial Sophia" (choir), "Wisdom and the Cage", "Tuna 1613", "Trul" (choir), "Close up the Streams" (choir), "Wand of Abaris", "Three Treasures", "Adulruna Rediviva")
- Katarina Lilja – vocals ("Gothic Kabbalah", "Perennial Sophia", "Trul", "Close up the Streams", "The Falling Stone", "Chain of Minerva")
- Hannah Holgersson – vocals, soprano ("Der Mitternachtslöwe", "Wisdom and the Cage", "Son of the Staves of Time", "Trul" (choir), "Wand of Abaris" (choir), "T.O.F. - Trinity", "Chain of Minerva", "Adulruna Rediviva")
- Jonas Samuelsson–Nerbe – tenor ("Tuna 1613", "Path to Arcady", "Adulruna Rediviva")
- Anna Nyhlin – solo soprano on "The Falling Stone" and "Path to Arcady"
- Karin Fjellander – choral soprano
- Ken Hensley – Hammond organ
- Joakim Svalberg – Hammond organ
- Rolf Pilotti – solo flute on "Gothic Kabbalah" and "Trul"
- Stefan Glaumann – tambourine

=== Others ===
- Sanken Sandqvist – engineering
- Thomas Ewerhard – design

== Singles ==
Wand of Abaris

- Released: 15 December 2006
- Label: Nuclear Blast
- Tracks:
1. "The Wand of Abaris"
2. "Path to Arcady"
3. "TOF – The Trinity"

The Wand of Abaris / Path to Arcady

- Released: 2007
- Label: Nuclear Blast
- Tracks:
1. "The Wand of Abaris"
2. "Path to Arcady"
