= Vovin (album) =

Studio album by Therion
- Released: 4 May 1998
- Recorded: October 1997 − January 1998
- Studios: Woodhouse Studios (Hagen, Germany)
- Genre: Symphonic metal
- Length: 52:10
- Labels: Nuclear Blast; NB 317-2
- Producer: Siegfried Bemm

Therion chronology
A'arab Zaraq – Lucid Dreaming (1997)	Vovin (1998)	Crowning of Atlantis (1999)

Professional ratings
Review scores
Source	Rating
AllMusic	4/5 stars

Vovin (in Enochian VOVIN, VOVINA means dragon) is the seventh studio album by Swedish symphonic metal band Therion. It is their bestselling album, selling over 150,000 copies in Europe alone. Even though it was released under the name Therion, Christofer Johnsson regards this as his solo album, as it was recorded entirely with studio musicians who were not members of the band.

== Track listing ==
All lyrics are written by Thomas Karlsson; all music is composed by Christofer Johnsson.

No.	Title	Length
1.	"The Rise of Sodom and Gomorrah"	6:45
2.	"Birth of Venus Illegitima"	5:13
3.	"Wine of Aluqah"	5:02
4.	"Clavicula Nox"	8:47
5.	"The Wild Hunt"	3:47
6.	"Eye of Shiva"	6:17
7.	"Black Sun"	5:08
8.	"Draconian Trilogy: The Opening"	1:28
9.	"Draconian Trilogy: Morning Star"	3:34
10.	"Draconian Trilogy: Black Diamonds"	2:56
11.	"Raven of Dispersion"	5:57
Total length:		52:10

== Credits ==
- Christofer Johnsson - guitar, keyboards

=== Guest artists ===
- Tommy Eriksson - guitar
- Wolf Simon - drums
- Jan Kazda - bass guitar, additional arrangements, orchestra and choir conducting
- Waldemar Sorychta - additional guitars
- Siegfried Bemm - additionals guitars, production, mixing, mastering
- Lorentz Aspen - Hammond organ ("Draconian Trilogy")
- Ralf Scheepers - lead vocals ("The Wild Hunt")
- Martina Astner - solo and duet alto and soprano vocals
- Sarah Jezebel Deva - solo and duet alto and soprano vocals

=== Choir ===
- Eileen Küpper - soprano
- Angelica Märtz - soprano
- Dorothea Fischer - alto
- Anne Tributh - alto
- Gregor Dippel - tenor
- Max Cilotek - tenor
- Javier Zapater - bass
- Jochen Bauer - bass

=== Indigo Orchestra ===
Orchestration was made by Indigo Orchestra:

- Petra Stalz - violin
- Heike Haushalter - violin
- Monika Maltek - viola
- Gesa Hangen - cello
- Alois Kott - double bass, contrabass

== Single ==
- "Eye of Shiva"

== Notes ==
1. Bonus track

== Charts ==
Chart (1998)	Peak position
Austrian Albums (Ö3 Austria)	48
German Albums (Offizielle Top 100)	46
