= Piotr Wawrzeniuk =

- P. Wawrzeniuk as a live member of Therion, Paris, December 2007
- Born: 25 January 1971 (age 55); Warsaw, Poland
- Education: Södertörn University
- Occupations: Musician, singer, historian
- Title: Senior Lecturer at Södertörn University
- Musical career
- Genres: Heavy metal, punk rock
- Instrument: Drums
- Formerly of: Therion, Serpent, Carbonized, The Robots

Piotr Wawrzeniuk (born 25 January 1971) is a Polish historian and musician. He is best known as a member of the symphonic metal band Therion, and as a member of Serpent, Carbonized, and The Robots.

== Music career ==
Wawrzeniuk was a member of Swedish symphonic metal band Therion, of a doom metal side project of Therion and Entombed members—Serpent, Swedish death metal band Carbonized, and Swedish punk rock group The Robots.

He was a singer and drummer for Therion between 1992 and 1996. Later he performed as a guest lead vocalist on Secret of the Runes (2001) bonus tracks, Lemuria and Sirius B (2004), and also as a live vocalist during the 20th Year Anniversary Tour in 2007. A cooperation with Joakim Knutsson (Rise and Shine) resulted in creation of Downforce of Doom. Wawrzeniuk released five albums with Stockholm based punk rock band The Robots, beginning in 1991.

== Academic career ==
Wawrzeniuk holds a PhD in history. His thesis is Confessional civilising in Ukraine : the bishop Iosyf Shumliansky and the introduction of reforms in the diocese of Lviv 1668-1708 Med polska ögon. Försvarsförmåga och hotbilder kring Östersjön i polsk militär rapportering 1919-1939 assesses Polish military perspectives on defence capacity and threat perceptions in Sweden, Finland and Estonia during the interwar years. He published articles within the field of genocide studies.

He works as lecturer in military history at Swedish Defence University.

== Publications ==
- Wawrzeniuk, Piotr (2020). Med polska ögon : försvarsförmåga och hotbilder kring Östersjön i polsk militärrapportering 1919-1939. Lund. ISBN 978-91-88909-66-4. OCLC 1250253056.
- Wawrzeniuk, Piotr (2005). Confessional civilising in Ukraine : the bishop Iosyf Shumliansky and the introduction of reforms in the diocese of Lviv 1668-1708. Huddinge: Södertörns högskola. ISBN 91-89315-56-1. OCLC 65469619.
- Wawrzeniuk, Piotr (2014). Kosmonautka. Dorota Wojciechowska, Mirosław Bańko. Warszawa: Wydawnictwo Poławiacze Pereł. ISBN 978-83-937988-1-0. OCLC 876479973. nominated Best Book for Children Award 2014
- Wawrzeniuk, Piotr (2015). Strażaczka. Dorota Wojciechowska, Mirosław Bańko. Warszawa: Wydawnictwo Poławiacze Pereł. ISBN 978-83-937988-3-4. OCLC 907390392.

== Discography ==
- Carbonized – For the Security (1991)
- Carbonized – Disharmonization (1993)
- Therion – Symphony Masses: Ho Drakon Ho Megas (1993)
- The Robots - Music You Will Listen to Over and Over Again (1994)
- Therion – Lepaca Kliffoth (1995)
- The Robots - Songs that Satan Whispered in Our Ears (1995)
- Carbonized – Screaming Machines (1996)
- Serpent – In the Garden of Serpent (1996)
- Therion – Theli (1996)
- Serpent – Autumn Ride (1997)
- The Robots - S/N (1997)
- Therion – A'arab Zaraq - Lucid Dreaming (1997)
- The Robots - Day of the Robots (2000)
- Therion – Secret of the Runes (2001) — guest appearance
- Therion – Sirius B (2004) — guest appearance
- Therion – Lemuria (2004) — guest appearance
- The Robots - We are Everywhere (2004)
- Serpent – Trinity (2007)
