= Lars Rosenberg =

Swedish bassist

- Born: 2 February 1971 (age 54)
- Genres: Metal
- Occupation: Musician
- Instrument(s): Bass guitar, vocals

Lars Rosenberg (born 2 February 1971) is a Swedish former musician who played bass guitar in several bands: Therion (1994–1996), Entombed (1990–1995), Taura (2000–2002), Serpent, Roachpowder, Carbonized, Mental Distortion, Monastery and Furcas. He was also a vocalist in Carbonized and Monastery.
