= Carbonized =

Swedish metal band

- From left: Piotr Wawrzeniuk, Christofer Johnsson, Lars Rosenberg

Background information
- Origin: Saltsjöbaden, Sweden
- Genres: Technical death metal; progressive metal; progressive rock; avant-garde metal
- Years active: 1988–1996
- Labels: Thrash, Foundation 2000
- Members: Christofer Johnsson; Lars Rosenberg; Piotr Wawrzeniuk
- Past members: See: Former member listing

Carbonized was a Swedish avant-garde metal band formed in Saltsjöbaden in 1988. The band was formed by Lars Rosenberg in 1988, with Dismember vocalist Matti Kärki. Joined by drummer Piotr Wawrzeniuk, the trio was completed by Therion's Christofer Johnsson, who originally agreed to only perform session guitarwork but eventually became a full-time member.

The band never officially split up, but stopped being active after recording the Screaming Machines album in 1994 (released 1996).

In 2024, their album Disharmonization was named one of the 10 "wackiest" progressive metal albums ever by Loudwire.

== Music ==
Quite different from anything that any of the members would become involved in later, the three albums ran the gamut from psychedelic infused grindcore on For The Security to discordant jazz-metal weirdness on Disharmonization to something more avant-garde on Screaming Machines, and described as "the worst of Sonic Youth, Syd Barret era Pink Floyd, old Black Flag, and Voivod" by Christofer Johnsson. Both Rosenberg and Wawrzeniuk were featured on a few Therion albums through Christofer Johnsson, and they also paired up in the doom band Serpent.

== Band members ==
=== Last known lineup ===
- Christofer Johnsson – guitar, vocals
- Lars Rosenberg – bass, vocals
- Piotr Wawrzeniuk – drums

=== Former members ===
- Matti Kärki – vocals
- Jonas Derouche – vocals, guitar
- Markus Rüdén – drums
- Stefan Ekström – guitar
- Per Ax – drums

== Discography ==
=== Studio albums ===
- For the Security (1991)
- Disharmonization (1993)
- Screaming Machines (1996)

=== Singles ===
- "No Canonization" (1990)

=== Splits ===
- Chronology of Death (with Sentenced, Bluuurgh... and Xenophobia) (1991)

=== Demos ===
- Au-to-dafe (1989)
- Recarbonized (1990) on Witchhunt Records – Believe in Church and Agonize
- Two Faces (1990) on Witchhunt Records – Believe in Church and Agonize
