= Megarock Records =

Swedish record label

Megarock Records was a Swedish record label which focused on heavy metal music. It was located in Stockholm.

== Bands ==
- Abstrakt Algebra
- Ace's High
- Alien
- Backyard Babies
- Bad Habit
- Candlemass
- Criss
- Crossroad Jam
- It's Alive
- Jester
- Landberk
- Machine Gun Kelly
- Megaton
- Misha Calvin
- Nocturnal Rites
- Passion Street
- Pole Position
- The Quill
- Renegade
- Schizophrenic Circus
- Shadowseeds
- Slam St Joan
- Sphinx
- Ten Foot Pole (Sweden)
- Therion
- Tungsten
- Walk the Wire

== See also ==
- List of record labels
