= Magnus Barthelsson =

Swedish musician

Magnus Barthelsson is a guitarist and former member of Therion (1993–1994), Grain, Feeble Lies, Conspiracy and Formicide.
