= Lemuria (album) =

Studio album by Therion
- Released: 24 May 2004
- Recorded: 2003
- Genre: Symphonic metal
- Length: 42:14
- Language: English & German
- Label: Nuclear Blast; NB 1253-2; Digipack: NB 1295-0
- Producer: Lars Nissen, Therion

Therion chronology
Live in Midgård (2002)	Lemuria (2004)	Sirius B (2004)

Professional ratings
Review scores
Source	Rating
Allmusic	4.5/5 stars

Lemuria is the eleventh studio album by Swedish symphonic metal band Therion. The album title refers to the name of a supposed sunken continent Lemuria, much like Atlantis. It was released simultaneously with Sirius B. Cover artwork was made by Thomas Ewerhard.

== Track listing ==
All tracks are written by All lyrics by Thomas Karlsson; All music by Christofer Johnsson, expect where noted.

No.	Title	Length
1.	"Typhon (music by Kristian Niemann)"	4:36
2.	"Uthark Runa"	4:41
3.	"Three Ships of Berik, Part 1: Calling to Arms and Fighting the Battle"	3:19
4.	"Three Ships of Berik, Part 2: Victory!"	0:44
5.	"Lemuria"	4:15
6.	"Quetzalcoatl"	3:47
7.	"The Dreams of Swedenborg"	4:58
8.	"An Arrow from the Sun"	5:54
9.	"Abraxas"	5:21
10.	"Feuer Overtüre/Prometheus Entfesselt (music by Kristian Niemann and Christofer Johnsson)"	4:39
Total length:		42:14

== Lyrical themes ==
- Typhon was a monster in Greek mythology. According to Aeschylus, he fought all the gods of Olympus: Zeus defeated him and chained him under Mount Etna, from where his rage creates eruptions.
- Futhark was a runic alphabet used by various Germanic peoples; Uthark is an occult interpretation of said alphabet.
- Berik is the mythological chief of all Gothic tribes: according to Jordanes, he departed from his Scandinavian motherland with three ships. The crews of the ships were the ancestors of the three Goth tribes.
- Lemuria was a hypothetical "lost land", like Atlantis.
- Quetzalcoatl is an Aztec deity.
- Abaris was a legendary sage and priest of Apollo.
- Emanuel Swedenborg was an 18th-century Christian mystic, whose work became the foundation of The New Church.
- Abraxas is a Gnostic word of great importance.

== Credits ==
- Christofer Johnsson – lead vocals ("Typhon", "Three Ships of Berik part 1: Calling to Arms and Fighting the Battle"), rhythm guitar, keyboards ("An Arrow from the Sun", "Feuer Overtüre / Prometheus Entfesselt"), classical and choir arrangements
- Kristian Niemann – lead guitar, acoustic guitar
- Johan Niemann – bass guitar
- Mats Levén – lead vocals ("Uthark Runa"), rock and roll vocals ("Abraxas")

=== Guest musicians ===
- Steen Rasmussen – mellotron ("Lemuria"), Hammond organ
- Jens Nyborg – balalaika, domra
- Sven Lindblad – balalaika
- Kavi Björkqvist – balalaika
- Richard Evensand – drums
- Piotr Wawrzeniuk – lead vocals ("Lemuria", "The Dreams of Swedenborg", "Feuer Overtüre / Prometheus Entfesselt")
- Peter Mossman – narration ("Lemuria")
- Orchestra: The City of Prague Philharmonic Orchestra (conducted by Adam Klemens and Mario Klemens)
- Choir: Kühn Mixed Choir (conducted by Mario Klemens)

== Charts ==
Chart (2004)	Peak position
Dutch Albums (Album Top 100)	76
Hungarian Albums (MAHASZ)	34
