= Secret of the Runes (album) =

Studio album by Therion
- Released: 8 October 2001
- Recorded: May − June 2001
- Studio: Modern Art Studio (Stockholm, Sweden)
- Genre: Symphonic metal
- Length: 57:18
- Label: Nuclear Blast; NB 625-2; Digipack: NB 683-2
- Producer: Therion, Christofer Johnsson

Therion chronology
Deggial (2000)	Secret of the Runes (2001)	Lemuria (2004)

Professional ratings
Review scores
Source	Rating
Allmusic	4.5/5 stars

Secret of the Runes is the tenth studio album by Swedish symphonic metal band Therion. It's a concept album based on Norse mythology, where each song describes one of the nine worlds. Cover artwork was made by Thomas Ewerhard, it features nine Scandinavian runes, each corresponding to a certain mythological world.

Album also includes two cover versions as bonus tracks. A music video was filmed for the Summer Night City cover.

== Track listing ==
All songs written by Christofer Johnsson.

No.	Title	Length
1.	"Ginnungagap"	6:10
2.	"Midgård"	5:04
3.	"Asgård"	4:07
4.	"Jotunheim"	3:43
5.	"Schwarzalbenheim"	5:18
6.	"Ljusalfheim"	3:53
7.	"Muspelheim"	2:13
8.	"Nifelheim"	4:33
9.	"Vanaheim"	4:02
10.	"Helheim"	3:18
11.	"Secret of the Runes"	4:30
Total length:		57:18

Limited edition digipak bonus tracks
No.	Title	Length
12.	"Crying Days" (Scorpions cover)	4:32
13.	"Summer Night City" (ABBA cover)	4:55

Digipak edition bonus tracks
No.	Title	Length
14.	"The Wings of the Hydra" (live)	3:23
15.	"Black Sun" (live)	5:46

== Runes ==
Runes shown on the front cover (and also in the booklet) are Nordic runes with the Elder Futhark alphabet. On the back cover every song has its own rune character:

1. "Ginnungagap (Prologue)"
2. "Midgård"
3. "Asgård"
4. "Jotunheim"
5. "Schwarzalbenheim"
6. "Ljusalfheim"
7. "Muspelheim"
8. "Nifelheim"
9. "Vanaheim"
10. "Helheim"
11. "Secret of the Runes (Epilogue)"

Secret of the Runes title is written in the Elder Futhark alphabet on the front cover as:

· · ·

and it is transliterated as: "sekret of þe runes".

== Credits ==
- Christofer Johnsson - rhythm guitar, keyboards, percussion, additional choir and orchestra arrangement on Bonus Tracks
- Kristian Niemann - lead and rhythm guitar
- Johan Niemann - bass guitar
- Sami Karppinen - drums, percussion
- Piotr Wawrzeniuk - lead vocals on "Crying Days" and "Summernight City"

=== Vocal and string soloists ===
- Marika Schonberg - solo soprano
- Erika Andersson - solo alto
- Carl Rahmqvist - solo tenor-baritone
- Anna Rodell - solo violin
- Asa Akerberg - solo cello
- Thomas Karlsson - whispering voice on "Ljusalfheim"

=== Choir ===
- Kristina Hansson - coloratura soprano
- Anna-Maria Krawe - soprano
- Anna Artursson - alto
- Marika Schonberg - alto
- Henrik Holmberg - tenor
- Patrik Forsman - tenor
- Carl Rahmqvist - tenor-baritone
- Joakim Berg - bass-baritone

=== String ensemble ===
- Anna Rodell - first violin
- Josef Cabrales-Alin - first violin
- Malin Samuelsson - second violin
- Johan Moren - second violin
- Linda Svedrup - viola
- Niklas Sjunesson - viola
- Asa Akerberg - cello
- Monica Jonsson - cello

=== Woodwinds (solo and ensemble) ===
- Fareidah Hildebrand - flute, alt flute, piccolo
- Erik Rodell - oboe, English horn
- Henrik Blixt - bassoon, contrabassoon

=== Brass ensemble ===
- Mikael Sorensen - trumpet, fluegelhorn
- Ayman Al Fakir - horn, Wagner tuba
- Kristina Borg - horn
- Rune Bodin - trombone

=== Choir and orchestra on Bonus Tracks ===
- Anna Rodell - first violin
- Elisabeth Lagergren - second violin
- Petter Axelsson - viola
- Erik Rodell - oboe
- Ingela Bolin - soprano (ensemble and solo), alto
- Anna Artursson - soprano, alto
- Henrik Holmberg - tenor, baritone
- Pierre Pettersson - tenor (ensemble and solo), baritone

== Charts ==
Chart (2001)	Peak position
German Albums (Offizielle Top 100)	74
Polish Albums (ZPAV)	38
