= Deaf Records =

British record sublabel

Deaf Records was a British record sublabel of Peaceville Records, located in Dewsbury and focused on heavy metal music.

== Bands ==
- Accidental Suicide
- Agathocles
- At the Gates
- Banished
- Drudge
- Impaler
- Isengard
- Morta Skuld
- Pitchshifter
- Prophecy of Doom
- Therion
- Vital Remains
