= The Miskolc Experience =

Live album by Therion
- Released: Europe June, 2009
- Recorded: 16 June 2007; Miskolc, Hungary
- Genre: Symphonic metal
- Length: Disc one: 39:06; Disc two: 56:38; Total: 1:35:44
- Label: Nuclear Blast; NB 2353-0

Therion chronology
Live Gothic (2008)	The Miskolc Experience (2009)	Sitra Ahra (2010)

The Miskolc Experience is the fourth live album by Swedish symphonic metal band Therion. It was released in Europe in June 2009. Unlike their other live albums this doesn't only feature the band's original material, but also Therion covering various pieces from classical artists. It was recorded at the 2007 Miskolc Opera Festival.

== Track listing ==
Disc 1: Part 1 - Classical Adventures
No.	Title	Length
1.	"Clavicula Nox"	10:35
2.	"Dvořák: Excerpt from Symphony no. 9"	2:04
3.	"Verdi: 'Vedi! Le fosche notturne spotigle' from Il trovatore"	2:46
4.	"Mozart: 'Dies Irae' from Requiem"	1:59
5.	"Saint-Saëns: Excerpt from Symphony No. 3"	2:15
6.	"Wagner: 'Notung! Notung! Neidliches Schwert!' from The Ring"	7:10
7.	"Wagner: Excerpt from the Overture from Rienzi"	3:12
8.	"Wagner: Second Part of 'Der Tag ist da' from Rienzi"	7:18
9.	"Wagner: First Part of 'Herbei! Herbei!' from Rienzi"	1:48
Total length:		39:06

Disc 2: Part 2 - Therion Songs
No.	Title	Length
1.	"Blood of Kingu"	5:54
2.	"Sirius B"	3:52
3.	"Lemuria"	4:22
4.	"Eternal Return"	7:22
5.	"Draconian Trilogy"	8:38
6.	"Schwarzalbenheim"	5:29
7.	"Via Nocturna"	9:44
8.	"The Rise of Sodom and Gomorrah"	6:55
9.	"Grand Finale"	4:24
Total length:		56:38 (1:35:44)

== DVD Content ==
=== Live concert ===
1. Clavicula Nox
2. Dvořák: Excerpt from Symphony No. 9
3. Verdi: 'Vedi! Le fosche notturne spoglie' from Il trovatore
4. Mozart: 'Dies Irae' from Requiem
5. Saint-Saëns: Excerpt from Symphony No. 3
6. Wagner: 'Notung! Notung! Neidliches Schwert!' from The Ring
7. Wagner: Excerpt from the Overture from Rienzi
8. Wagner: Second Part of 'Der Tag ist da' from Rienzi
9. Wagner: First Part of 'Herbei! Herbei!' from Rienzi
10. The Blood of Kingu
11. Sirius B
12. Lemuria
13. Eternal Return
14. Draconian Trilogy
15. Schwarzalbenheim
16. Via Nocturna
17. The Rise of Sodom and Gomorrah
18. Grand Finale

=== Bonus features ===
1. Documentary
2. Therion Goes Classic - Bucharest 2006

The Live Show CDs were mastered by Maor Appelbaum

== Charts ==
Chart (2009)	Peak position
French Albums (SNEP)	108
