= Therion (band) =

Swedish symphonic metal band

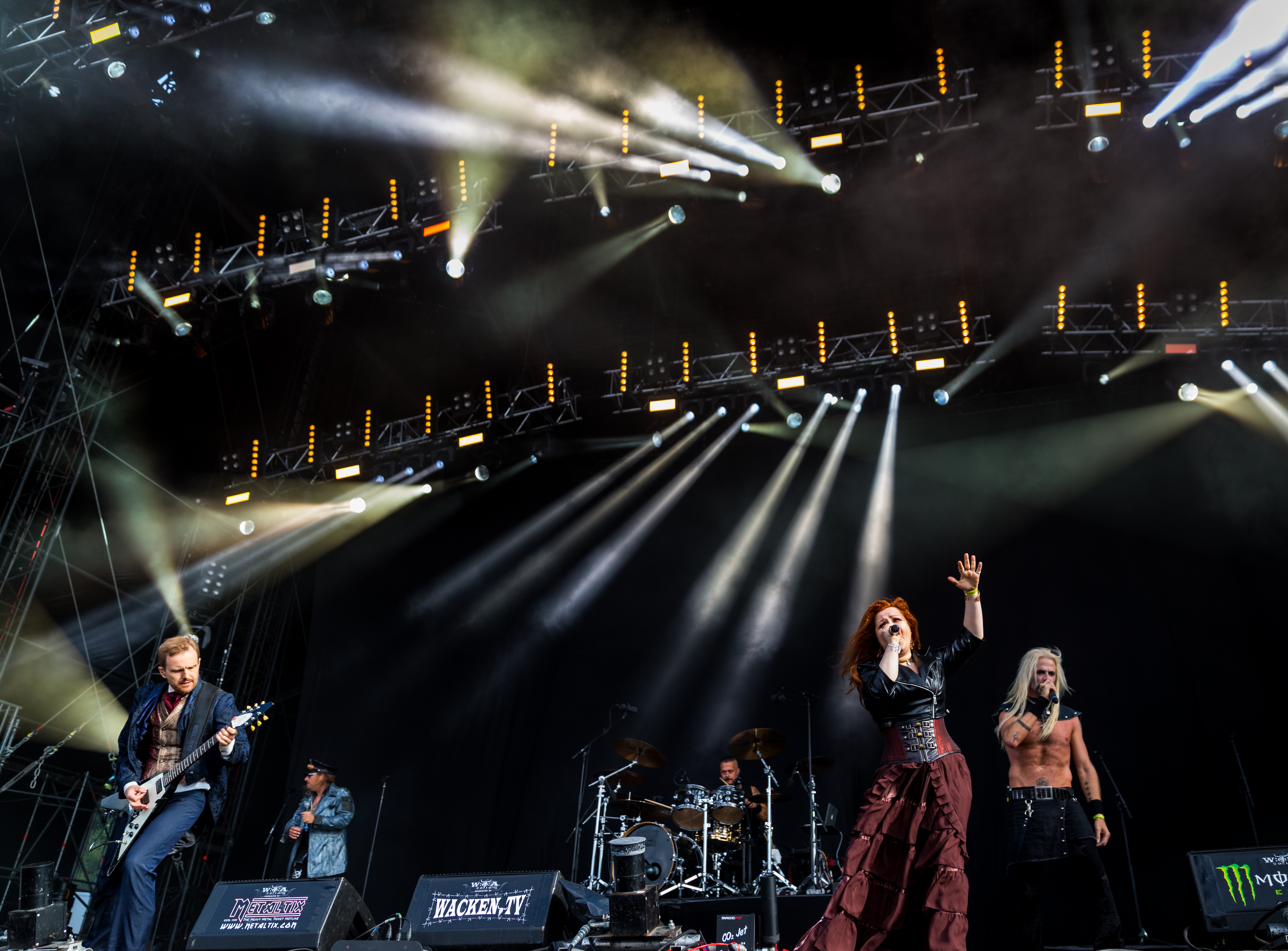
- Therion live at Wacken Open Air 2016

Background information
- Also known as: Blitzkrieg (1987–1988); Megatherion (1988)
- Origin: Upplands Väsby, Sweden
- Genres: Symphonic metal; death metal (early)
- Years active: 1987–present
- Labels: Nuclear Blast, Deaf, Active, Megarock
- Members: Christofer Johnsson; Thomas Vikström; Lori Lewis; Christian Vidal; Nalle "Grizzly" Påhlsson; Sami Karppinen
- Past members: (Members by album)

Therion is a Swedish symphonic metal band founded by Christofer Johnsson in 1987. Its name, meaning "Beast" in Greek, was inspired by the Celtic Frost album To Mega Therion. (Note: Τὸ Μέγα Θηρίον, To Mega Therion, is Greek for "The Great Beast" and was a title used by occultist Aleister Crowley.) Originally a death metal band, Therion adjusted its musical style by adding orchestral elements, including choirs, classical musicians, and even a full orchestra at their concert performances. As a result, they are considered pioneers of the symphonic metal genre.

Therion takes its themes for the lyrics from different mythologies and practices, including occultism, magick, and ancient traditions and writings.

== History ==
=== Blitzkrieg and Megatherion (1987–1988) ===
Therion originated as the band Blitzkrieg in Upplands Väsby, Sweden. In 1987, Christofer Johnsson, who had played bass for three months, teamed up with guitarist Peter Hansson, whom he had been jamming with, and drummer Oskar Forss, who was Johnsson's old schoolmate. The band's main influences were Metallica and Slayer, but its sound more resembled Venom and Motörhead. The band only performed two concerts. (Note: Although Blitzkrieg did not record any demos, some of its songs have been added to Therion's repertoire. There include "Rockn' Roll Jam" and "Scared to Death (Excerpt)", which are on Bells of Doom, and "Fight Fire with Fire", which is a cover of Metallica's song. The first Therion album, Of Darkness..., includes riffs from the Blitzkrieg-developed song "Morbid Reality".) In March 1988, it split up after some problems with Forss.

In 1988, the band reformed with the moniker Megatherion, which was based on the album title To Mega Therion by the Swiss extreme metal band Celtic Frost. Johnsson has mentioned that therion is Greek for "beast" and likens it to Belphegor. Johnsson switched from bass to guitar and Peter Hansson played guitar. Johan Hansson (who would later form the Swedish death metal band Crematory) became its bassist, and Mika Tovalainen its drummer. After the band shortened its name to Therion, Erik Gustafsson of Dismember replaced Johan Hansson as the bassist, and Oskar Forss returned and replaced Tovalainen as the drummer. Matti Kärki, later to be the front man of Dismember, also joined the band and took over the vocals.

=== Demos and record deals (1989–1993) ===
Therion "Asphyxiate with Fear" (1991)
Sample from Therion's "Asphyxiate with Fear". From the album Of Darkness....

In 1989, Therion released two demos: Paroxysmal Holocaust and Beyond the Darkest Veils of Inner Wickedness. Matti had left the band shortly after the first demo, so Christofer took over the vocals again. In 1990, the band worked with House of Kicks, a local record store, to print and release the Time Shall Tell demo on 12 inch vinyl. The latest release enabled the band the sign a one-album record deal with Deaf Records.

Therion's first full-length album, Of Darkness..., released in 1991, featured songs that Johnsson had composed in the 1980s. The band called it "both a debut album and the end of an era", and described it as progressive death metal, since it contained elements that did not quite fit the standards of death metal at the time. The lyrics were very political, in the vein of Napalm Death, Nuclear Assault and other late-1980s hardcore punk bands.

Therion signed with Active Records for its second album, Beyond Sanctorum. Prior to the recording sessions, Gustafsson left the band to return to the United States, so Therion continued as a trio with Hansson, Forss and Johnsson, the last of whom covered the bass. The album shows a more experimental edge to the death metal music; keyboard and clean vocals were used sparingly.

After the recording, Therion changed members again. Forss left the band, and Hansson had to quit for health issues. For the Central European gigs, Johnsson brought in drummer Piotr Wawrzeniuk from his other band Carbonized, bassist Andreas Wahl, and Magnus Barthelsson who was an old friend from school.

=== Musical metamorphosis (1993–1996) ===
In order to scale down operations, Active Records had stopped releasing new records and transferred the band to Megarock Records. They released Symphony Masses: Ho Drakon Ho Megas in 1993. Its style combined death metal and doom metal, with elements of Middle Eastern music, industrial music, traditional 1980s heavy metal, classical music and religious chanting. Symphony Masses sold about 10,000 copies, which was more than the band's first two albums, but hardly a financial success. As the band's touring gigs were not that profitable, Barthelsson and Wahl quit the band, and Fredrik Isaksson was brought in as the new bassist. After a hiatus where Johnsson worked as a vocalist for Messiah, they received an offer to join metal label Nuclear Blast. Megarock Records, lacking the resources to properly promote the band, decided to release Therion without any strings attached. Therion signed with Nuclear Blast in 1994, and remained with them until 2023.

Therion's first album with Nuclear Blast was Lepaca Kliffoth, with its single "The Beauty in Black" released in advance of the album. To Johnsson's surprise, "The Beauty in Black" sold 12,000 copies in Europe, before the company stopped printing. The album experimented with more elements: "a classic soprano and bass-baritone, more keyboards, more Persian influences, more melodies". Johnsson had "a new style of singing" that severed their ties to death metal. The album sold around 15,000 copies over the following weeks. (Note: Current European sales estimates for Lepaca Kliffoth are around 35,000 copies.) Isaksson had some personal problems, and was eventually released from the band. Therion brought in bassist Lars Rosenberg from the death metal band Entombed. The band toured with Annihilator in Germany, and also did a small headlining tour in Argentina and Chile.

=== Symphonic metal beginning (1996–2001) ===
Therion "To Mega Therion" (1996)
Sample from Therion's "To Mega Therion". From the album Theli.

Therion "Clavicula Nox" (1998)
Sample from Therion's "Clavicula Nox". From the album Vovin.

In 1996, Therion recorded their experimental album Theli. The album heavily featured the vocals of two choirs, as well as vocals from Johnsson, Wawrzeniuk and guest vocalist Dan Swanö. The album featured keyboards and classic samples, which was labeled the "Barmbek Symphony Orchestra" after the subway station next to the studio. Jason Ankeny of Allmusic noted that the album "was almost universally acclaimed as the apex of Therion's career to date, fully realizing Johnsson's taste for elaborate, operatic grandeur". In a month, the album sold 20,000 copies.

Personal issues plagued the band's members. Jonas Mellberg, who had joined as a guitarist from Unanimated, had severe alcohol problems, and walked out during the recording sessions of some cover songs in the Abyss Studio. Wawrzeniuk was busy with his studies, so Johnsson brought in session members for their tours, including Tommy Eriksson of Shadowseeds. Rosenberg also had drinking problems, which got worse during a European tour they did supporting Amorphis, so he was fired shortly after. The sales had gone up over 60.000 with the tour, more than triple that of Lepaca Kliffoth. which meant the band broke out from the underground and became an established name in the metal music business.

In 1997, Therion released A'arab Zaraq - Lucid Dreaming, which contained unreleased songs from Theli, some covers, and Johnsson's soundtrack that he produced for a short art movie called The Golden Embrace.

Johnsson noted that the next album, Vovin, was practically a solo album as it used studio musicians instead of the ones from the Theli tour, besides Eriksson, who provided some guitar support. Vovin was recorded at Woodhouse Studios; it involved a real string orchestra for the first time, and a "hand picked opera choir" which included Austrian singer Martina Hornbacher, and British vocalist Sarah Jezebel Deva. The album was released in 1998, and in two months, sales had reached 150,000 in Europe alone, doubling sales of Theli.

The band toured with Moonspell and showcased Hornbacher and Deva on vocals. It brought in Sami Karppinen as the drummer, Kristian Niemann on guitar, and his brother Johan Niemann on bass. The album Crowning of Atlantis, released in 1999, was a mini-album that was padded to full-length with covers and live tracks.

The band's next release, Deggial, involved the participation of a full orchestra. Johnsson noted it was 90% another solo album, but with a more permanent band lineup. Deggial sold more copies than Theli but not as many as Vovin.

=== Secret of the Runes (2001–2002) ===
Therion "Asgård" (2001)
Sample from Therion's "Asgård". From the album Secret of the Runes.

Johnsson had written seven songs but shelved them in order to make a Nordic concept album. He built a recording studio for the band called "Modern Art". The band's tenth album, Secret of the Runes, was released in 2001, and had themes from the nine worlds of Norse mythology. It included the cover songs of "Crying Days" (Scorpions) and "Summer Night City" (ABBA), of which, Piotr Wawrzeniuk provided vocals. The album received positive reviews, and was an Allmusic editors' pick. Therion headlined tours in Europe and Latin America with Evergrey and My Insanity. Afterwards, Karppinen left the band to focus as a sound engineer for Modern Art, but brought in replacement drummer Richard Evensand.

In 2001, Therion released the compilation album Bells of Doom to its official fan club. It includes recordings from the Blitzkrieg days in 1987, demos from 1989 that did not appear on any album, and an unofficial promotional demo from 1994 that enabled the band to land the record deal with Nuclear Blast. The album was later sold through Therion's webstore. In 2002, Therion released its first concert album Live in Midgård, which contained recordings from its Secret of the Runes tour. Mostly drawing from its Budapest concert, the album was released to commemorate the band's 15th anniversary.

=== Lemuria and Sirius B (2004–2006) ===
Therion "Lemuria" (2004)
Sample from Therion's "Lemuria". From the album Lemuria.

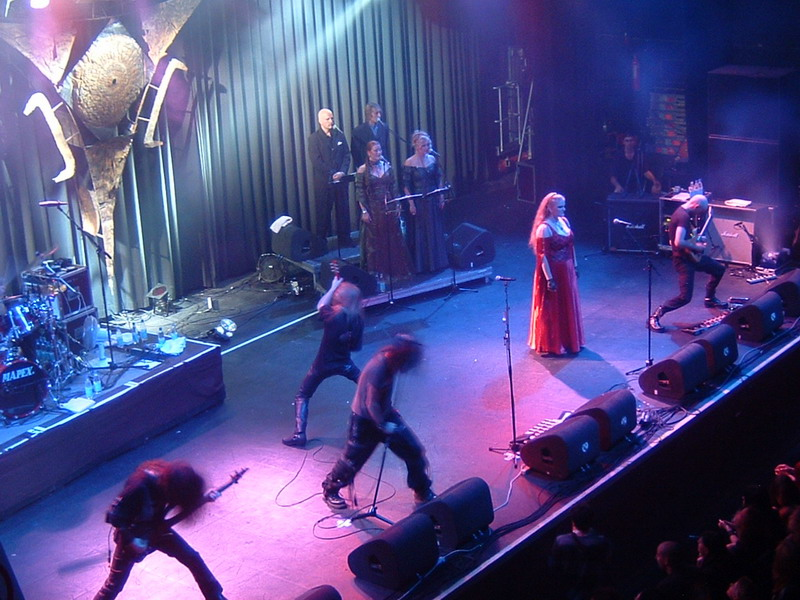
Live in Netherlands, 2004

After the Secret of the Runes tour, the band had amassed 55 unreleased songs which included the ones Johnsson had shelved as well as contributions from the Niemann brothers. Johnsson remarked that "we went through the songs and realized that we had enough good material for three albums. Recording one after the other, promoting, and touring each one separately would have taken several years and would have been a bad idea; and being so productive, we would have had another 55 songs waiting when we finally came to the end of it." In 2004, the band released 21 tracks on two albums: Lemuria and Sirius B. The albums were released simultaneously and were available as separate albums or a twin-pack. 171 musicians participated, including the City of Prague Philharmonic Orchestra and a 32-member choir. Contributing to lead vocals were Mats Levén and a returning Piotr Wawrzeniuk.

In July 2005, the band released Atlantis Lucid Dreaming, which is a compilation of the 1997 tracks that were not part of The Golden Embrace soundtrack (not including its Iron Maiden cover of "Children of the Damned"), and seven tracks from its 1999 album Crowning of Atlantis. It included a bonus live version of "Black Sun".

The band toured Lemuria / Sirius B over two years and 106 shows, with its final performance at the ProgPower Festival in Cheltenham, UK on 21 March 2006. The last gig marked Johnsson's final vocal stage performance.

Therion released their first DVD set, Celebrators of Becoming, in May 2006. The set contains four DVDs which include concert footage from its 2004 visit to Mexico City, documentaries of its 2004–2006 World Tour, Johnsson's art movie The Golden Embrace, the band's music video singles, bootlegs and commentaries, and two audio CDs from its Mexico City concert.

=== Gothic Kabbalah, live classical shows, and the 20th Anniversary Tour (2006–2007) ===
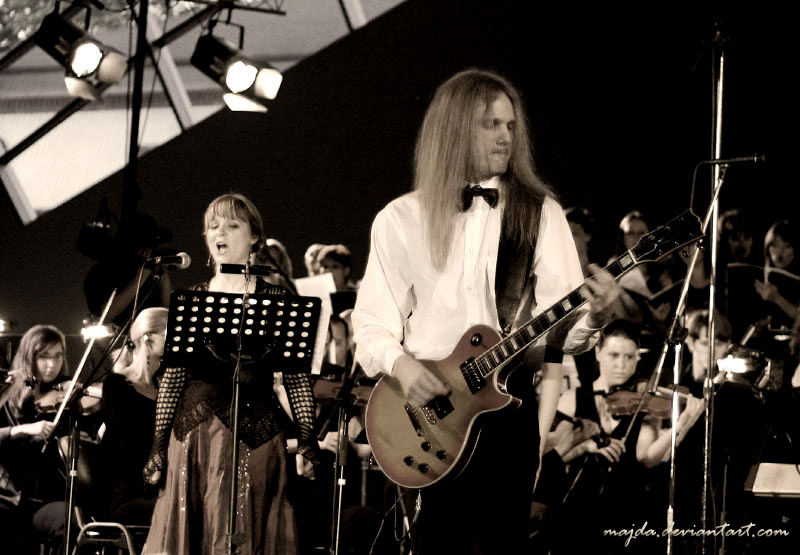
Lori Lewis and Christofer Johnsson with symphonic orchestra and choir during the live classical show at the Miskolc Opera Festival, Hungary, 2007.

In September 2006, Johnsson announced that recording was completed for a new album with 9 songs written by then drummer, Petter Karlsson. Gothic Kabbalah was released on 12 January 2007, and was followed with a tour through Europe, North and South America with Grave Digger and with support act Sabaton. Therion also toured Japan for the first time. The band's Warsaw gig was recorded for the live album and video set Live Gothic, which was released in 2008.

In these times Therion held live shows that included local symphonic orchestras and choirs. The "Therion Goes Classic" show took place on 9 December 2006, in Bucharest, Romania. Another show followed at the Miskolc Opera Festival in Miskolc, Hungary on 16 June 2007, with future band member Lori Lewis as its featured vocalist. The first half of the show featured orchestral pieces from Dvořák, Verdi, Mozart, Saint-Saëns, and Wagner. The second half pulled from Therion's repertoire. The song "Clavicula Nox" was featured as a full orchestral version in the first half. The Bucharest concert was broadcast on Romanian television, and its first part was later released together with the entire Miskolc concert as the DVD/CD box set The Miskolc Experience in June 2009.

Therion played at Wacken Open Air in August 2007. In November–December 2007, Therion had a 20-year anniversary tour with 16 shows in Europe. Songs included "Kali Yuga" parts 1 and 2, the entire Theli album, and "Adulruna Rediviva". Part of the set list was determined by fan voting. Some songs were accompanied by keyboardist Ferdy Doernberg and a belly dancer on stage, and some of the shows featured also the ex-singers Piotr Wawrzeniuk and Mats Levén. The Budapest gig of the tour was recorded, but it was released only in February 2014 as a part of the DVD Adulruna Rediviva and Beyond.

=== New line up and Sitra Ahra (2008–2011) ===
In 2008, the band announced that its core group of musicians would be parting ways, but Johnsson posted that he was in no way ending Therion. Johan Koleberg became the new drummer, and Nalle Påhlsson the bassist. The band did not tour that year, except for a single open-air festival show in Płock, Poland on 6 September.

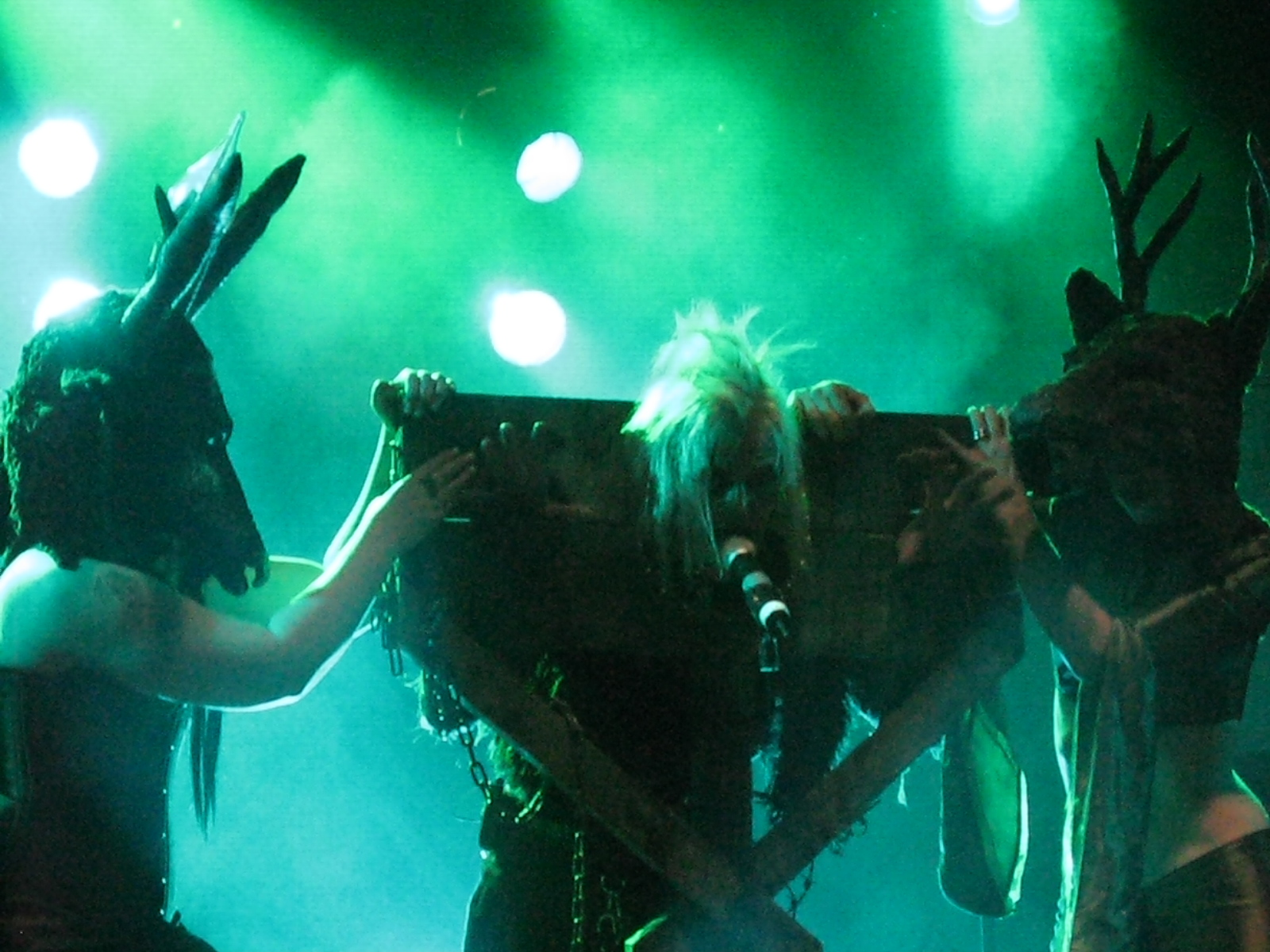
Therion symbolism and occultism-driven appeal is also present on the band live presentations.

On 10 May 2009, following the release of The Miskolc Experience, Therion announced Thomas Vikström as its new lead vocalist. The band worked on a new album, Sitra Ahra, which featured new guitarist Christian Vidal, and Snowy Shaw on vocals. (Note: On 15 July 2010, Snowy Shaw (Gothic Kabbalah, Sitra Ahra) left Therion briefly because of throat problems, and joined Dimmu Borgir for about a month before he rejoined Therion.)

Sitra Ahra was released on 17 September 2010 The band toured South and Central America for 17 days, and European tour through November and December. (Note: For the 2010 Sitra Ahra tour, Nalle Påhlsson did not participate; Waldemar Sorychta was the bassist.)

In March 2011, Gothic Kabbalah singer Katarina Lilja left the band for a second time to "re-join the boring civil world and not be a cool rock star anymore". Thomas Vikström's daughter, Linnéa, provided supporting vocals for the band since the Bloodstock Open Air festival in 2011. Therion performed at Hellfest Summer Open Air, ProgPower USA, and the 2012 cruise liner based festival 70000 Tons of Metal. In a Bloodstock interview, Shaw mentioned that the band will work on new material at the end of the year. In September 2011, after four years of collaboration and session work, vocalist Lori Lewis joined Therion as a member. In this year also a board game called "011" was released; it features the band members and is based on the Sitra Ahra album.

=== Les Fleurs du Mal and Luciferian Light Orchestra (2012–2016) ===
On 14 February 2012, Therion announced it was recording a studio album and had planned a 25th Anniversary Tour. Les Fleurs du Mal was released on September 28. The album is considered by Johnsson to be an "art project", which includes not only the music, but also special inlay graphics and video clips – in 2015 partly released on a limited edition DVD called Garden Of Evil. The album consisted of covers of French chansons and pop songs that were performed in the band's style. On the release day the 25th Anniversary Tour was also started through Europe, also featuring the album's contributing keyboardist Stefan Jernståhl. Some leftover songs were released on an EP Les Épaves in the end of 2015.

On 14 September, Johnsson posted a statement on the band's website about developing a rock metal opera, and that the band will not be doing any major tours or releasing studio albums. According to this, in 2013 the band was to play only at three minor summer festivals in Europe. In April 2013 this statement was reconsidered by Johnsson itself, and the Rock Opera Unveiled Tour was scheduled for December 2013 with 15 European gigs, to test the fans' acceptance of the new material. The main framework of these shows included excerpts from the future rock opera, and the entire Vovin album due to its 15th anniversary.

On 21 February 2014 two new releases were put on market: a deluxe edition of Theli – including three bonus tracks from A'arab Zaraq – Lucid Dreaming and a DVD with Theli's live performance – and a DVD set Adulruna Rediviva and Beyond with the 2007 Anniversary concert in Budapest and the 2011 Atlanta show.

In 2014 the Rock Opera unveiled tour has continued with a Latin American leg, which has also meant – "due to family- and work-related reasons" – the last live performances of Lori Lewis. However, she has remained a band member for studio performances. The new touring singer has become Sandra Laureano, debuting on the Summer festival gigs and the tour for the first time in China and through entire Russia in October 2014. The Russian leg of this tour was made upon the invitation of their 2013 tour support band Arkona, and drums were played by their former member Sami Karppinen, as Johan Koleberg was not able to tour with them. However, Sandra as a dramatic soprano did not suit for every song, so she was replaced first by coloratura Isa García Navas, and later Chiara Malvestiti to sing in the shows.

In 2015 Johnsson worked on another side project, called Luciferian Light Orchestra, which features songs in the '70s occult rock style. An eponymous album was also released in that year, accompanied by on-stage appearances as support of Therion's 2015 Latin American and 2016 European tours, featuring Vidal and Påhlsson (both of them masked) on guitar. In addition to the last two tours, Therion had the very first acoustic gigs in Latin America and on 3 July 2016 in Bucharest.

CDs and DVDs related to the side projects were not released by Nuclear Blast, but by Johnsson's own label, Adulruna.

=== Beloved Antichrist (2017–2019) ===
On 13 November 2016 the band announced that Johan Koleberg had decided to leave the band "due to different goals in playing music". For the 2017 live gigs the former Amon Amarth member Fredrik Andersson filled in, then on 21 November 2017 Sami Karppinen officially re-joined.

On 26 January, Johnsson revealed he had been suffering from intense pain in the neck and shoulders, and he was diagnosed with two spinal disc herniations (allegedly resulting from years of headbanging), and he was at risk of losing the ability to perform live. As a result, the rock opera project was delayed and the band downplayed their sets of songs in concerts to allow Johnsson to perform. By 8 April, Johnsson announced he had been able to avoid surgery as his condition had improved through physiotherapy, and the band would resume performing at festivals by August.

Johnsson also arranged the orchestration of Sabaton's stage show with symphonic orchestra, performed on 13 July 2017 at the Masters Of Rock festival in Vizovice, Czech Republic.

On 15 August 2017, the band announced the title and the release date of an operatic rock musical. Beloved Antichrist – inspired by and partly based on Vladimir Solovyov's Tale of the Antichrist – containing over 3 hours of music, and 29 vocal characters was scheduled for 26 January 2018, later postponed first to 2 February and finally to 9 February.

In 2018 a European and a Latin American tour was scheduled, later also extended for China, and – for the very first time – Australia. After the last show of the tour, Linnéa Vikström ended the collaboration with the band and was replaced by the new touring member Rosalía Sairem.

On 10 August 2019 Nalle Påhlsson has decided to withdraw from touring, and remain only a member for songwriting and studio recordings. For the year's only remaining show Justin Biggs from the band Sorcerer was standing in.

=== The Leviathan trilogy and Con Orquesta (2020–2026) ===
The first Leviathan album was released on 22 January 2021, partly with Snowy Shaw on drums. A sequel, titled Leviathan II, was released on 26 October 2022. The third and final installment album, Leviathan III, was released on 15 December 2023 by the band's new label, Napalm Records.

The 2022 festival shows of the band featured again Johan Koleberg on drums, as Sami Karppinen took over the duties on Opeth's concerts after the leaving of Martin Axenrot. For the end of the year a European tour was scheduled, but cancelled due to problems with their booking agent and also stating increased costs of touring contributing to the decision. Instead of it only four shows were played in Malta, Greece and Turkey in January 2023, subsequently followed by a long Latin-American tour, which included 18 shows in Mexico.

The conclusion of the trilogy was followed up by a tour through Europe and China in February and March 2024. As Chiara Malvestiti became unable to stand on stage due to her pregnancy and childbirth the year before, Lori Lewis returned as a touring singer too. The tour was preceded by the band's third show with orchestra and choir in Mexico City on 20 January 2024, which didn't feature any covers, and deviated only slightly from the tour's setlist. The second leg of the tour went through Turkey and Latin America in Autumn 2024.

On 30 January 2026, Therion released a new album, Con Orquesta, featuring orchestral arrangements from their 2024 live show in Mexico with the Orquesta Sinfónica Nacional de México, by Napalm Records. For their latest orchestral enterprise, Christofer Johnsson invited two renowned Mexican musicians, conductor Rodrigo Cadet and composer Bernardo Lorentze, "to reinterpret our songs by adding new arrangements and expanding the originals with the orchestra. They also wrote some new intros and small interludes, making this a truly authentic Mexican interpretation of Therion live with orchestra."

== Influences ==
Therion draws its influences from several different bands. The name comes from Celtic Frost's 1985 album To Mega Therion and much of its music prior to Theli was inspired by the 1987 album Into the Pandemonium. For Theli, the band drew from Pink Floyd's album Atom Heart Mother and progressive rock group Klaatu's album Hope.

From Vovin onwards, the band has drawn inspiration from classical composers like Richard Wagner and Richard Strauss, heavy metal acts from the 1980s like Iron Maiden, Accept, 1970s hard rock bands such as Scorpions, Uriah Heep, Judas Priest, and "tons of progressive '70s bands that nobody knows anymore these days".

== Symbols ==
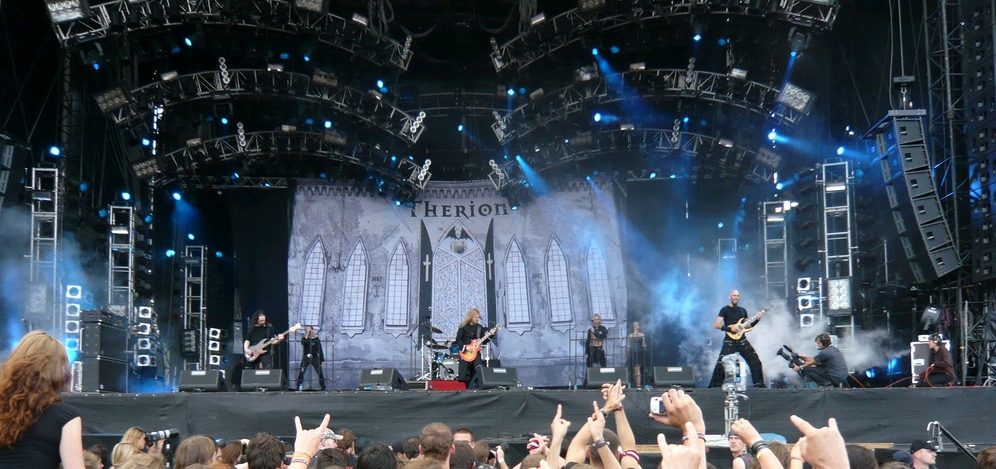
Therion performs at Wacken Open Air in 2007

The symbols on Therion's album covers originate from magick and occult themes. The most common symbol is an {11:5} hendecagram, an eleven-pointed star. First appearing on the 1993 album Symphony Masses: Ho Drakon Ho Megas, and most album since, it symbolizes the night side of the Qabalah.

Other symbols include:

- Pythagorean pentagram (one point down), on the dragon's head, for the cover of Symphony Masses: Ho Drakon Ho Megas.
- Nordic runes with Elder Fuþark alphabet, on the front cover and the booklet for the album Secret of the Runes.
- Celtic cross, on the booklet's page for "Helheim" on the album Secret of the Runes.
- Clavicula Nox, a key symbol in Dragon Rouge and also the title of one of the band's tracks, on the covers of Crowning of Atlantis, Vovin (inlay), and "Eye of Shiva".
- Mjölnir, the Hammer of Thor, on the inlay cover of Secret of the Runes.
- The astronomical symbols Venus (♀), moon (☽), and sun (☉), on the covers for The Early Chapters of Revelation box-set.
- The Kabbalistic Tree of Life, seen on the Sitra Ahra album cover.

== Band members ==
Current

- Christofer Johnsson — guitars, keyboards, programming, Hammond organ, orchestral arrangement (1988–present), lead vocals (1988–2006), bass (1988, 1991–1992)
- Sami Karppinen — drums (1998-2003, 2017–present)
- Nalle Påhlsson — bass (2008–present; studio only since 2019)
- Thomas Vikström — vocals (2009–present; live member: 2007)
- Christian Vidal — guitar (2010–present)
- Lori Lewis — vocals (2011–present; 2014–2023 studio only)

Touring

- Rosalía Sairem — vocals (2019–present)
- Chris Davidsson — bass, backing vocals (2021–present)

== Discography ==
- Of Darkness... (1991)
- Beyond Sanctorum (1992)
- Symphony Masses: Ho Drakon Ho Megas (1993)
- Lepaca Kliffoth (1995)
- Theli (1996)
- A'arab Zaraq – Lucid Dreaming (1997)
- Vovin (1998)
- Crowning of Atlantis (1999)
- Deggial (2000)
- Secret of the Runes (2001)
- Lemuria (2004)
- Sirius B (2004)
- Gothic Kabbalah (2007)
- Sitra Ahra (2010)
- Les Fleurs du Mal (2012)
- Beloved Antichrist (2018)
- Leviathan (2021)
- Leviathan II (2022)
- Leviathan III (2023)
