= Thomas Karlsson =

Swedish occult writer (born 1972)

Thomas Karlsson (born 1972) is a Swedish occult and esoteric writer, with a PhD in the History of Religions from Stockholm University. In 1989 he founded Dragon Rouge, a Left-Hand Path initiatory organisation.

== Dragon Rouge ==
In 1989, Thomas Karlsson and six other magicians founded Dragon Rouge, a Left-Hand Path initiatory organisation and a Draconian Tradition Order, led by Karlsson. As a book author, he concentrates on occult, philosophy, and paranormal topics. The Dragon Rouge website cites Carlos Castaneda, Julius Evola, and Kenneth Grant as some of the magical writers whose work is read by the order, as are texts by classical philosophers such as Herakleitos, Plato, and Plotinos, as well as modern philosophers like Friedrich Nietzsche, Martin Heidegger, and Henri Bergson. His personal influences include Sumerian mythology, alchemy, tantra, the goetia, and the qlippoth. In an interview dated in 2003, he claims he experienced astral projections as a child, but did not think of them as supernatural experiences until he started formally exploring the occult. In his book Amongst Mystics and Magicians in Stockholm (2012), he describes experiences he had in the years 1989–1991 which are related to the establishment of Dragon Rouge. The book exhibits Karlsson's influences from people such as Aleister Crowley, Grant and Anton LaVey.

== Books ==
- Uthark – Nightside of the Runes (ISBN 91-974102-1-7).
  - a.k.a. Uthark – Im Schattenreich der Runen (German title, ISBN 978-3-935581-29-5) — incl. Therion-CD Secret of the Runes
- Kabbala, kliffot och den goetiska magin (ISBN 91-974102-2-5)
  - a.k.a. Qabalah, Qliphoth and Goetic Magic (English title, ISBN 978-0-9721820-1-0)
  - a.k.a. La Kabbala e la magia goetica (Italian title, ISBN 978-88-7169-213-5)
  - a.k.a. Kabbalah, Qliphoth und die Goetische Magie (German title, ISBN 978-3-939459-10-1)
  - a.k.a. Qabale, Qliphoth et magie goétique (French title, ISBN 979-10-94880-07-4)
  - a.k.a. Qábalah, Qlífot y Magia Goética (Spanish title)
- Astrala resor ut ur kroppen (ISBN 91-7894-005-2)
- Adulrunan och den götiska kabbalan (ISBN 91-974102-3-3)
  - a.k.a. Le rune e la kabbala (Italian title, ISBN 978-88-7169-207-4)
  - a.k.a. Adulruna und die gotische Kabbala (German title, ISBN 978-3-939459-04-0)
  - Revised and translated to English as: Nightside of the Runes: Uthark, Adulruna, and the Gothic Cabbala, Inner Traditions 2019 (ISBN 978-1620557747)
- Götisk kabbala och runisk alkemi. Johannes Bureus och den götiska esoterismen (ISBN 978-91-628-8030-9) — Doctoral thesis, Stockholm University, 2010
- Bland mystiker och magiker i förorten (2012) (ISBN 978-91-974102-7-4)
  - a.k.a. Amongst Mystics And Magicians In Stockholm (English title, 2014)
  - a.k.a. L'éveil du Grand Dragon Rouge (French title, ISBN 979-10-94880-13-5)
  - a.k.a. Entre Místicos y Magos en Estocolmo (Spanish title)
  - a.k.a. Tra Mistici e Maghi a Stoccolma (Italian title), Hekate Edizioni 2020

== See also ==
- Magical organization
