= Christofer Johnsson =

Swedish musician (born 1972)

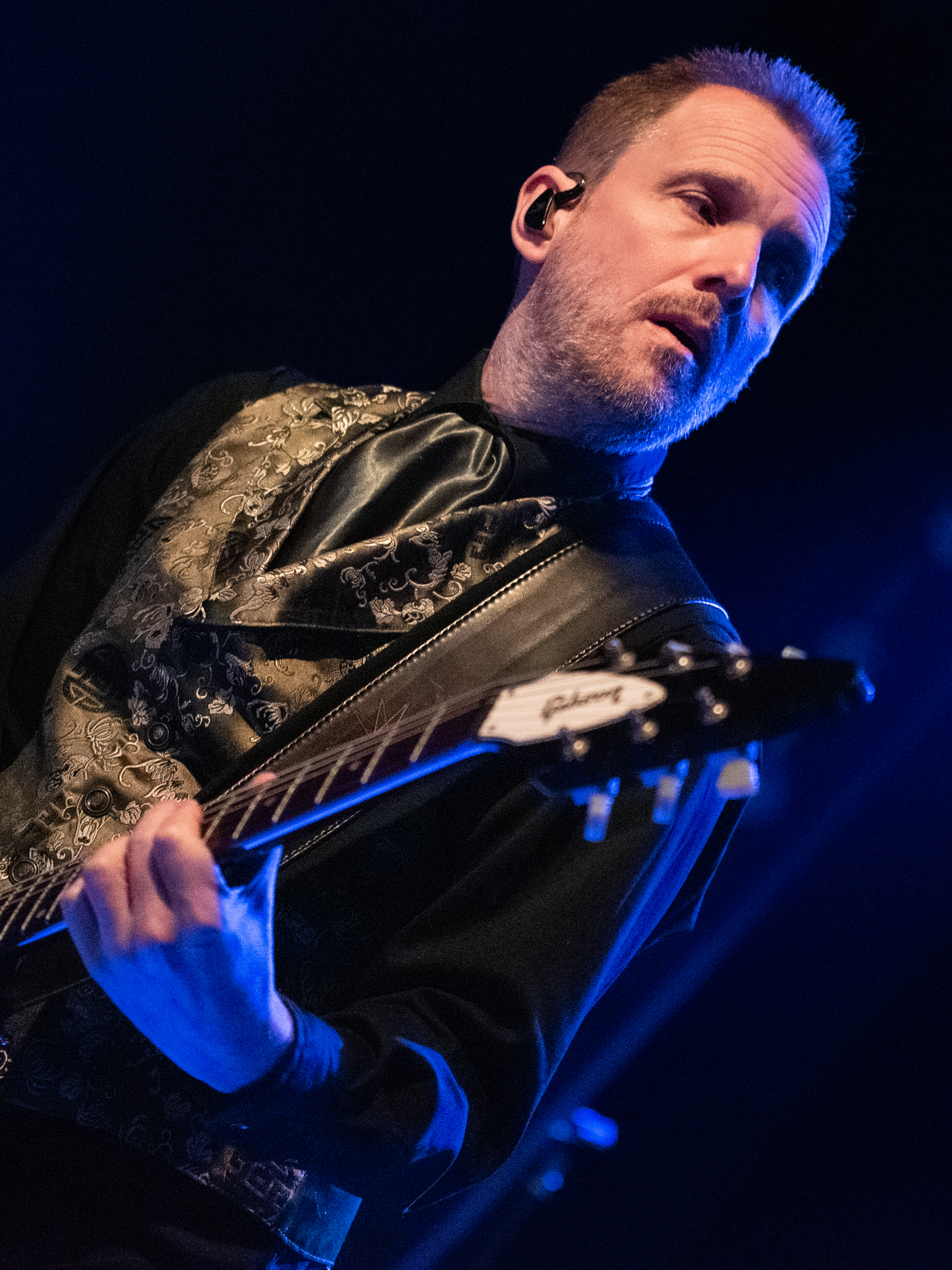
- Johnsson with Therion in 2023

Background information
- Born: 10 August 1972 (age 54); Upplands Väsby, Sweden
- Genres: Symphonic metal, progressive metal, death metal, progressive death metal, thrash metal
- Occupations: Musician, composer, producer
- Instruments: Guitar, bass, keyboards, vocals
- Years active: 1987–present

Christofer Jan Johnsson (born 10 August 1972) is a Swedish musician and producer. He is a founding member and the guitarist for symphonic metal band Therion and was previously a member of Carbonized, Liers in Wait, Messiah, and Demonoid. In 2006, he announced he will no longer sing for Therion – though he will continue as guitarist for the group. He also has his occult vintage rock side project Luciferian Light Orchestra and the classic 80s heavy metal band Defenders of the Faith.

== Inspiration and influences ==
In his childhood, Johnsson enjoyed listening to classical music and gradually became more interested in his father's '50s and '60s rock. Popular music played on the radio in this era generally had a lot of strings in it, and even though much of it did not fall in his taste, it still managed to influence him. As a seven-year-old, he heard his first progressive rock as a theme in a Norwegian children TV program. At age nine, he started to listen to The Beatles, who also used brass and strings in songs like "Penny Lane". Two years later, his taste for music took a turn as he started to listen to hard rock and heavy metal bands like Accept, Judas Priest, Iron Maiden, Manowar, Ozzy Osbourne, Black Sabbath and Uriah Heep. Some of these bands had symphonic elements in some of their songs. When he was 14, he started to listen to more raw heavy metal bands like Metallica, Slayer, Bathory and especially Celtic Frost. One of his friends played the B-side of a Scorpions album for him, and Johnsson instantly fell in love with the band's older albums. Uli Jon Roth, who played guitar on these albums, had broken up with Scorpions and formed the band Electric Sun. Christofer managed to find a copy of one of their albums after a long search, and ended up becoming obsessed with the music. He mentions Roth as one of his greatest influences in the early symphonic Therion albums.

== Personal life ==
Johnsson used to reside in "Villa Adulruna", south of Stockholm, with his girlfriend Mina Karadzic. In 2019, they sold the villa and moved to the island of Gozo, Malta. He has been a vegetarian since 1997 and has a child.

In July 1992, Johnsson's parents' house was set on fire. Christofer was on tour and not home at the time of the incident. Only one inch of a backdoor was damaged before the fire was put out, but the event was blown up in media and caused many rumours in the metal scene.

=== Health problems ===
In January 2017, Johnsson revealed he had been suffering from intense pain in the neck and shoulders, and he was diagnosed with two spinal disc herniations and he was in risk of losing the ability to perform live. As a result, the rock musical project "Beloved Antichrist" was delayed and the band downplayed their sets of songs in concerts to allow Johnsson to perform. By 8 April, Johnsson announced he had been able to avoid surgery as his condition had improved through physiotherapy and he would resume to perform at festivals by August.
