= Boggy Creek Monster (film) =

2016 documentary by Seth Breedlove

- Promotional release poster by Sam Shearon
- Directed by: Seth Breedlove
- Written by: Seth Breedlove
- Produced by: Seth Breedlove; Brandon Dalo; Lyle Blackburn
- Cinematography: Zac Palmisano
- Edited by: Seth Breedlove
- Music by: Brandon Dalo
- Production company: Small Town Monsters
- Release date: November 11, 2016
- Running time: 73 minutes
- Country: United States
- Language: English

Boggy Creek Monster is a 2016 American documentary film about the Fouke Monster, a purported ape-like creature (similar to descriptions of Bigfoot) allegedly sighted in Fouke, Arkansas, in the early 1970s. Directed and co-produced by Seth Breedlove, it is Breedlove's third documentary film under the banner of his production company Small Town Monsters. It features narration and music by co-producers Lyle Blackburn and Brandon Dalo, respectively.

Boggy Creek Monster was released on DVD, Blu-ray, and streaming services on November 11, 2016. It premiered at Fouke Middle School the following day, before screening at the Palace Theatre in Canton, Ohio, on November 16.

== Production ==
=== Development ===
As with 2015's Minerva Monster, the first documentary film directed by Breedlove under the Small Town Monsters banner, funding for Boggy Creek Monster was raised in part by a crowdfunding campaign on the website Kickstarter. The campaign exceeded its goal of $9,000, receiving a total of $17,000.

Boggy Creek Monster is co-produced and narrated by Lyle Blackburn, who in 2012 authored the book The Beast of Boggy Creek: The True Story of the Fouke Monster.

=== Filming ===
Filming took place over six days in late April 2016, with a crew of seven people. The filmmakers captured between 40 and 50 hours of footage to use for editing.

== Release ==
Boggy Creek Monster was released on DVD, Blu-ray, and streaming services on November 11, 2016. The following day, on November 12, the film premiered in the cafeteria of Fouke Middle School in Fouke, Arkansas. On November 16, it screened at the Palace Theatre in Canton, Ohio.

The film later screened at the Roxy Theater in Missoula, Montana, on September 21, 2017, followed by a Q&A session with Breedlove.
