= List of festivals in West Virginia =

Festivals of West Virginia
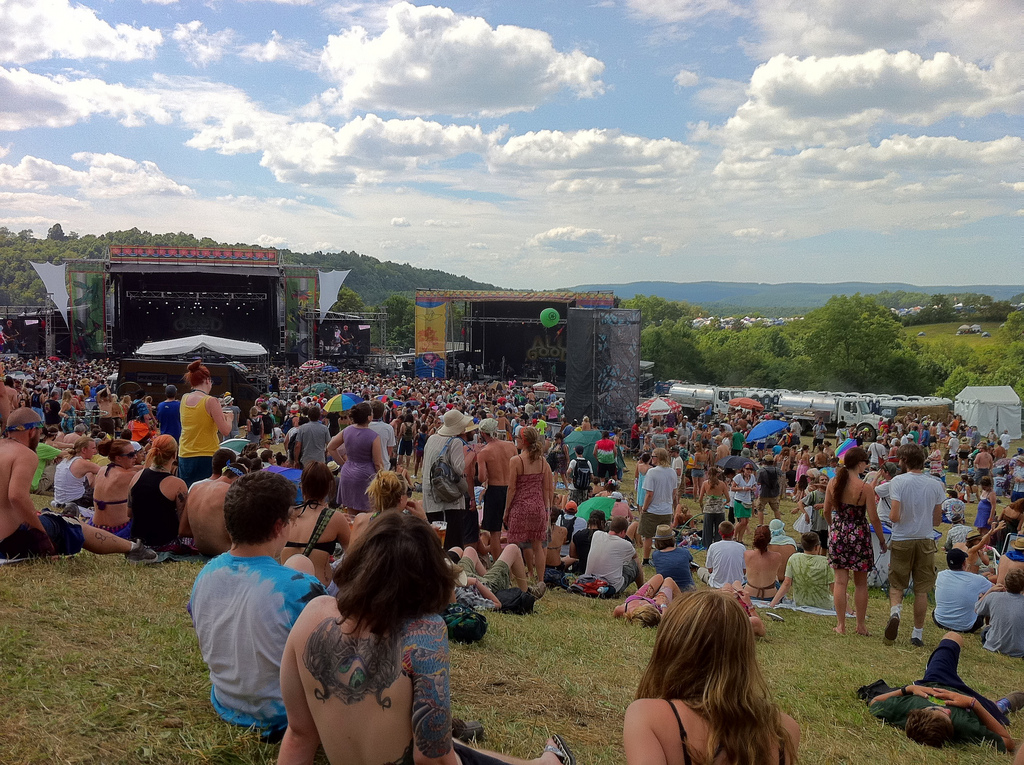
- Festivals of the United States; lists of festivals by state or region (American Samoa; Florida; Guam; Hawaii; Louisiana; Michigan; New Jersey; Pennsylvania; Puerto Rico; United States Virgin Islands; Virginia); culture of West Virginia; tourism in West Virginia

This is an incomplete list of festivals in West Virginia, USA with articles on Wikipedia. This list includes festivals of diverse types, among them regional festivals, commerce festivals, fairs, food festivals, arts festivals, religious festivals, folk festivals, and recurring festivals on holidays.

== List of festivals ==
Name	Type	Location	Date	Note
All Good Music Festival	Music festival	Summit Point, West Virginia		
American Conservation Film Festival	Film festival	Shepherdstown, West Virginia		
Appalachian Film Festival	Film festival	Huntington, West Virginia		
Appalachian String Band Music Festival	Music festival	Fayetteville, West Virginia		
Augusta Heritage Festival	Folk festival	Elkins, West Virginia		
Bridge Day	Folk festival	Fayetteville, West Virginia		
Contemporary American Theater Festival	Arts festival	Shepherdstown, West Virginia		
Gazette-Mail Kanawha County Majorette and Band Festival	Music festival	Kanawha County, West Virginia		
Italian Heritage Festival	Folk festival	Clarksburg, West Virginia		
Goodstock Music Festival	Music festival	Summersville, West Virginia		
Mothman Festival	Folk festival	Point Pleasant, West Virginia	Third week in September	
MTN Craft Film Festival	Film festival	Clarksburg, West Virginia		
Rails and Ales Festival	Beer festival	Huntington, West Virginia	Second Saturday in August	
Tsubasacon	Comicon	Charleston, West Virginia		
Vandalia Gathering	Folk festival	Charleston, West Virginia	Memorial Day weekend	
West Virginia Hot Dog Festival	Food festival	Huntington, West Virginia	Last Saturday of July	
West Virginia Memorial Day Parade	Parade	Grafton, West Virginia	Memorial Day	
West Virginia Pumpkin Festival	Food & Agricultural Festival	Milton, West Virginia	First weekend in October	
