= Seth Breedlove =

American filmmaker

- Born: Seth Breedlove; 1981 or 1982 (age 43–44); Bolivar, Ohio
- Occupations: Film director; producer; editor
- Years active: 2015–present
- Spouse: Adrienne Breedlove
- Children: 1

Seth Breedlove (born 1981/1982) is an American filmmaker and founder of the Wadsworth, Ohio-based production company Small Town Monsters. Under the Small Town Monsters banner, Breedlove has directed over a dozen documentary films and miniseries related to cryptids and cryptozoology, including Minerva Monster (2015), Boggy Creek Monster (2016), The Mothman of Point Pleasant (2017), and The Mothman Legacy (2020).

== Early life and education ==
Breedlove was born and raised in Bolivar, Ohio. His parents owned a bookstore in Bolivar that stocked history-focused titles, particularly books related to the American Civil War. Breedlove and his three siblings were homeschooled, and during his childhood, he was exposed to such films as those by director Billy Wilder and stop-motion animator Ray Harryhausen. Breedlove has stated that, "What got me into film, my mom showed me a Ray Harryhausen movie when I was a kid, and that was the first time that I became aware that there was a process involved in making movies, and that movies were put together by human beings rather than appearing on a screen magically. I just got really into film as a kid." As a child, he had an interest in becoming a filmmaker, and "was obsessed with screenwriting", though he did not view filmmaking as a realistic career path.

In a 2021 interview, Breedlove described himself as having been "an emo kid growing up. I think that comes through in [my] work", adding that he feels several of his films "definitely have that tone of crumbling midwest locales and the legacies that are sort of encapsulated in them."

After graduating high school in Ohio, Breedlove considered pursuing a career in writing children's books or young adult novels. In 1999, he briefly attended Kent State University at Stark before dropping out, having been dissatisfied with a creative writing course. According to Breedlove, he "lasted one day". At age 18, Breedlove met Zac Palmisano, who would go on to serve as cinematographer on several of Breedlove's documentary films.

== Career ==
=== 2013–2015: Founding Small Town Monsters ===
For several years after withdrawing from college, Breedlove worked various jobs, including a FedEx driver, floor tiler, landscaper, and medical bill processor. He also worked as a freelance newspaper reporter for Massillon, Ohio's The Independent, as well as the Medina Gazette.

Breedlove's interest in "monster"-related folklore began when a friend told him about a series of alleged Bigfoot sightings along St. Peter's Church Road in Bolivar in the 1970s. While working in medical billing and freelance reporting, Breedlove began listening to podcasts related to the paranormal, and had his own podcast focused on Bigfoot. He wrote a book proposal titled Small Town Monsters, about alleged monster sightings around the United States; he submitted the proposal to multiple publishers but each rejected it.

In 2013, Breedlove established the Wadsworth, Ohio-based production company Small Town Monsters. In September 2014, Breedlove began filming Minerva Monster, a documentary film about a purported Bigfoot-like creature allegedly sighted in and around Minerva, Ohio, in the 1970s. During post-production on the film in March 2015, Breedlove stated that he hoped Minerva Monster would be "part of a TV series about small-town monsters." Minerva Monster premiered on May 16, 2015, and is the first documentary film produced and released by the Small Town Monsters production company.

=== 2016–present: Further directorial work ===
In 2016, Breedlove directed and Small Town Monsters produced the short documentary Beast of Whitehall and the feature-length documentary Boggy Creek Monster. In 2017, Breedlove directed The Mothman of Point Pleasant, a documentary about alleged sightings of the legendary Mothman of West Virginia. That same year also saw the release of Invasion on Chestnut Ridge, a documentary focused on supposed paranormal or extraterrestrial occurrences in the Chestnut Ridge region of Pennsylvania. Both films were financed in part by an official crowdfunding campaign on the website Kickstarter.

In 2018, Breedlove directed two documentary films, The Flatwoods Monster: A Legacy of Fear (centered on the Flatwoods monster of West Virginia) and The Bray Road Beast (based on the purported creature of the same name allegedly sighted in Wisconsin). He also co-produced On the Trail of Champ, a five-episode documentary miniseries about Champ, a supposed lake monster in Lake Champlain. All three received funding from a Kickstarter campaign and were released under the Small Town Monsters banner. In 2019, Breedlove directed the documentary miniseries On the Trail of Bigfoot and the documentary films Terror in the Skies and Momo: The Missouri Monster.

Breedlove began filming The Mothman Legacy, a direct sequel to The Mothman of Point Pleasant, in December 2019. The Mothman Legacy experienced production delays due to the COVID-19 pandemic, and was unable to premiere as planned on September 18, 2020, at the Mothman Festival in Point Pleasant when the event was cancelled. The distribution rights for the film were acquired by 1091 Pictures, who released it on digital streaming platforms on October 20, 2020. That same year, the Breedlove-directed miniseries On the Trail of UFOs was released, as was the film The Mark of the Bell Witch, a documentary about the Bell Witch legend.

In 2021, Breedlove followed up the On the Trail of Bigfoot miniseries with both On the Trail of Bigfoot: The Journey and On the Trail of Bigfoot: The Discovery, and also followed up On the Trail of UFOs with On the Trail of UFOs: Dark Sky. Additionally, he directed Skinwalker: Howl of the Rougarou, a documentary film investigating the legend of the rougarou in Louisiana. In 2022, Breedlove directed the documentaries On the Trail of UFOs: Dark Sky and American Werewolves. As with previous Small Town Monsters productions, both On the Trail of UFOs: Dark Sky and American Werewolves, as well as the upcoming Breedlove-directed documentaries Bloodlines: The Jersey Devil Curse and On the Trail of Bigfoot: The Last Frontier, were supported by a Kickstarter campaign.

== Personal life ==
Breedlove lives with his wife Courteney, who is also involved in Small Town Monsters productions, in Wadsworth, Ohio. they both have children from previous relationships.

=== Beliefs ===
In 2018, when asked if he believes the individuals he interviews for his documentaries, Breedlove stated, "The simplest answer is I want to believe, but my confounded brain just won't let me accept everything I hear. I have too many questions as to how some of the phenomena could exist without definitive proof being offered for their existence. Having said that, I tend to believe that people I interview have experienced what they claim to experience more than I disbelieve them, so I think continuing to look into these subjects and seek answers to them is important."

In 2020, when discussing The Mothman Legacy, Breedlove stated, "Honestly, with the stuff we look into, it is completely irrelevant if it is real. We are exploring the culture that grows up around these stories; we are exploring the ways the stories can change and evolve with time and become something entirely different from what they started as. We are exploring the way that stories impact a generation of people. At the end of the day, the factual reality of the Mothman does not matter to me; that is not the story that I am interested in."

In July 2022, Breedlove claimed to have seen a Bigfoot-like creature while visiting a friend's property in Minerva, Ohio, the previous September.

== Filmography ==
=== Films ===
| Year | Title | Director | Producer | Writer | Editor | Notes | Ref(s) |
|---|---|---|---|---|---|---|---|
| 2015 | Minerva Monster | Yes | | Yes | | | |
| 2016 | Beast of Whitehall | Yes | | | | Short film | |
| 2016 | Boggy Creek Monster | Yes | Co-producer | Yes | Yes | Co-produced with Brandon Dalo and Lyle Blackburn | |
| 2017 | The Mothman of Point Pleasant | Yes | Yes | Co-writer | Yes | Co-wrote with Blackburn | |
| 2017 | Invasion of Chestnut Ridge | Yes | | Co-writer | Yes | Co-wrote with Mark Matzke | |
| 2017 | The Flatwoods Monster: A Legacy of Fear | Yes | Co-producer | Yes | Yes | Co-produced with Adrienne Breedlove | |
| 2018 | The Bray Road Beast | Yes | Co-producer | Co-writer | Yes | Co-produced with Adrienne Breedlove; co-wrote with Matzke | |
| 2019 | Terror in the Skies | Yes | Co-producer | Co-writer | Yes | Co-produced with Adrienne Breedlove and Elvin Altman; co-wrote with Matzke | |
| 2019 | Momo: The Missouri Monster | Yes | Co-producer | Co-writer | Yes | Co-produced with Adrienne Breedlove and Adam Duggan; co-wrote with Matzke and Jason Utes | |
| 2020 | The Mothman Legacy | Yes | Co-producer | Yes | Yes | Co-produced with Adrienne Breedlove | |
| 2020 | The Mark of the Bell Witch | Yes | Co-producer | | Yes | Co-produced with Adrienne Breedlove | |
| 2021 | Skinwalker: Howl of the Rougarou | Yes | Co-producer | | Yes | Co-produced with Adrienne Breedlove | |
| 2022 | American Werewolves | Yes | Co-producer | | Yes | Co-produced with Heather Moser | |

=== Miniseries ===
| Year | Title | Director | Producer | Writer | Editor | Notes | Ref(s) |
|---|---|---|---|---|---|---|---|
| 2018 | On the Trail of Champ | | Co-producer | | | Co-produced with Adrienne Breedlove | |
| 2019 | On the Trail of Bigfoot | Yes | Executive | Yes | Yes | Also cinematographer | |
| 2020 | On the Trail of UFOs | Yes | | Yes | Yes | Also cinematographer | |
| 2021 | On the Trail of Bigfoot: The Journey | Yes | Co-producer | Yes | Yes | Co-produced with Adrienne Breedlove; also cinematographer | |
| 2021 | On the Trail of UFOs: Dark Sky | Yes | Co-producer | | Yes | Co-produced with Adrienne Breedlove | |
| 2021 | On the Trail of Bigfoot: The Discovery | Yes | Co-producer | Yes | Yes | Co-produced with Adrienne Breedlove | |
| 2022 | On the Trail of UFOs: Night Visitors | Yes | | Yes | Yes | | |

== Critical reception ==
Reviewing Breedlove's directorial debut, Minerva Monster, Robert McCune of The Independent called the film "informative, entertaining and enough to make viewers think", as well as "thoughtfully produced and edited," but argued: "The filmmakers — though they offer no actual commentary of their own, only the claims and observations of those connected to the case — certainly are believers. Their bias shows in whom they didn't put in front of the camera: the naysayers and critics." Breedlove has stated that he and Small Town Monsters "get slammed a lot for not having a really skeptical side, but I think [our productions] are the least biased movies about these subjects. My goal is not to prove to people that something exists or doesn't exist, because I don't know for myself."

Breedlove's documentaries have sometimes been classified as also belonging to the horror film genre. He has expressed resistance towards such classification, stating, "Often, I see my films get classified as horror films, because they deal with these creatures. I don't consider that at all. I consider them human stories. I see the sadness more than I see the scares."

In 2019, Jon Baker of The Daily Jeffersonian wrote that Breedlove's films "have a growing fan base, and the critical reception has been positive too. His work has been viewed more than 3 million times on Amazon."

== See also ==
- Midwest emo – an offshoot of the emo subculture and music genre that developed in the 1990s Midwestern US
