= The Mothman Legacy =

2020 American documentary film

- Promotional release poster by Sam Shearon
- Directed by: Seth Breedlove
- Written by: Seth Breedlove
- Produced by: Adrienne Breedlove
- Narrated by: Lyle Blackburn
- Cinematography: Zac Palmisano
- Edited by: Seth Breedlove
- Music by: Brandon Dalo
- Production company: Small Town Monsters
- Distributed by: 1091 Pictures
- Release date: October 20, 2020
- Running time: 67 minutes
- Country: United States
- Language: English

The Mothman Legacy is a 2020 American documentary film about the Mothman, a purported humanoid creature known for allegedly being sighted in Point Pleasant, West Virginia, in the 1960s. Directed and edited by Seth Breedlove, the film is a direct sequel to the 2017 documentary The Mothman of Point Pleasant and a follow-up to the 2019 documentary Terror in the Skies, both of which were also directed by Breedlove. All three films are produced by Breedlove's production company Small Town Monsters.

The Mothman Legacy explores reported sightings of the Mothman—dating from the 1960s to 2019—beyond Point Pleasant, featuring accounts from supposed witnesses elsewhere in West Virginia, as well as Kentucky and the greater Appalachian region. The film was initially scheduled to premiere at the Mothman Festival in Point Pleasant on September 18, 2020, but the event was cancelled due to the COVID-19 pandemic. It was released on October 20, 2020, by 1091 Pictures, on Amazon Prime Video, YouTube, and other digital streaming platforms.

== Production ==
=== Development ===
The Mothman Legacy is a direct sequel to the 2017 documentary film The Mothman of Point Pleasant, as well as a follow-up to the 2019 documentary Terror in the Skies. All three films were directed by Seth Breedlove and produced by Breedlove's production company Small Town Monsters.

The Mothman of Point Pleasant covers the first popular alleged sightings of Mothman, which occurred in 1966 and 1967, and the collapse of the Silver Bridge on December 15, 1967, an incident which has been linked to the Mothman legend in popular culture. Breedlove has stated that he did not originally intend to create a sequel to The Mothman of Point Pleasant, as he initially felt that "the story was always the stuff in 1966 and 1967", forming a three-act structure that climaxed with the Silver Bridge collapse. The Mothman Legacy explores alleged sightings of the Mothman dating from the 1960s to 2019, featuring interviews with purported witnesses from elsewhere in West Virginia beyond the Point Pleasant area, as well as Kentucky and the greater Appalachian region. Breedlove stated that, for The Mothman Legacy, "We were all over the state of West Virginia. There's no shortage of people who claim to have seen the Mothman throughout Appalachia."

=== Filming ===
Roughly half of the footage for the film was shot in December 2019. As a result of the COVID-19 pandemic, the production experienced delays in early 2020. Breedlove said that, "We started back up in May, like two days after some of the restrictions lifted." Breedlove was initially unable to find crew members willing to work in close enough proximity to one another to shoot the reenactments of the alleged Mothman encounters in the film, but was eventually able to amass a crew of a sufficient size to do so.

== Release ==
The Mothman Legacy was originally scheduled to premiere at the Mothman Festival in Point Pleasant on September 18, 2020, but the event was cancelled due to the COVID-19 pandemic. The worldwide digital distribution and broadcast rights to the film were acquired by 1091 Pictures in June 2020, and the film was released on October 20, 2020, on Amazon Prime Video, YouTube, and other digital streaming platforms.

== Critical reception ==
On the review aggregator website Rotten Tomatoes, the film has an approval rating of 60% based on five reviews, with an average rating of 4.9/10.
