= Oblivion Beckons =

Studio album by Byzantine
- Released: January 22, 2008
- Genres: Thrash metal, groove metal
- Length: 53:56
- Label: Prosthetic
- Producer: Aaron Fisher

Byzantine chronology
…And They Shall Take Up Serpents (2005)	Oblivion Beckons (2008)	Byzantine (2013)

Professional ratings
Review scores
Source	Rating
AllMusic	4.5/5 stars
Blabbermouth.net	8/10 stars
Decibel	(favorable)

Oblivion Beckons is the third studio album by American heavy metal band Byzantine. It was released on January 22, 2008. According to vocalist Chris "OJ" Ojeda, the band "stripp[ed] down some things like the vocals for a more aggressive style and ... [went] out on a limb on some other things [they] have never tried before." Ojeda also described Oblivion Beckons as being the band's most varied album. The album reached #8 on CMJ.

== Track listing ==
No.	Title	Length
1.	"Absolute Horizon"	5:00
2.	"Nadir"	3:41
3.	"Oblivion Beckons"	3:54
4.	"The Gift of Discernment"	5:29
5.	"Expansion and Collapse"	3:44
6.	"Catalyst"	3:36
7.	"Pattern Recognition"	4:14
8.	"Renovation"	2:16
9.	"Centurion"	4:23
10.	"Receiving End of Murder"	4:13
11.	"All Hail the End Times"	3:46
12.	"Deep End of Nothing"	5:38
13.	"A Residual Haunting"	4:11

== Personnel ==
- Chris "OJ" Ojeda – vocals, guitars, piano
- Tony Rohbrough – guitars, keyboards
- Matt Wolfe – drums, acoustic guitar, lead guitar
- Michael "Skip" Cromer – bass, vocals, lead guitar
- Aaron Fisher – producer/engineer
- Drew Mazurek – mixing
- Allen Douches – mastering

== Trivia ==
- During the song "Deep End of Nothing" all four band members trade lead guitar solos since all members played guitar in previous bands before Byzantine.
- The Morse code intro that starts off the album spells out the phrase "Absolute Horizon Brings Death" three times.
- A common theme of death and finality is used throughout the lyrics coinciding with the fulfillment of their recording contract.
- The guitar melody at the beginning and end of "Centurion" is the haunting melody to the classic horror movie "The Howling".
- The album artwork utilizes once again the image of Tovah Miller, who was the actress in the music video for "Jeremiad" and the short performance film on the DVD Salvation.
