= Doomshine =

German metal band

Doomshine was a German doom metal band. They released three albums, among others one on Massacre Records.

The band hails from Ludwigsburg. It was started by Tim Holz and drummer Markus Schlaps; seasoned guitarist Sven Podgurski was brought on, having previously played in Tragedy Divine and Spiral Tower.

The band initially released through Iron Glory Records before signing on to Massacre Records in 2005. The music was chiefly compared to Candlemass and Solitude Aeturnus.

== Discography ==
- Thy Kingdoom Come (2004)
- The Piper at the Gates of Doom (2010)
- The End Is Worth Waiting For (2015)
