= Asphalt Mother =

Song by Mind Garage

from the album Early Years
- Released: 1968
- Studio: Bell Sound (New York City)
- Genre: Psychedelic rock, hard rock
- Length: 5:05
- Label: Morning Glori Music
- Songwriter: Larry McClurg
- Producer: Mind Garage

Audio sample
- file; help

"Asphalt Mother" was released as a 45 single in 1968. In 2006, it was included along with its flip side on the Mind Garage Early Years "Reach Out" CD which was a collection of seven demos recorded by the band in 1968.

== Background ==
The Mind Garage traveled from Morgantown, WV to Bell Sound Studios in New York to record Asphalt Mother and made only 1000 vinyl copies.

Norris Lytton uses an 8 string Hagstrom bass guitar for a sharp, crisp sound. John Vaughan's Gibson Firebird employs a gutsy fuzz tone, and Jack Bond's Hammond B-3 and Leslie hold the composition together. Syncopation with the other instruments is achieved by Ted Smith's precision drumming. After a fade out and a four-second pause when the song appears to be over, the music comes back in full force for another 30 seconds.

== Personnel ==
- Larry McClurg - Lead vocal, lyrics
- John Vaughan - Lead guitar
- Jack Bond - Keyboard
- Ted Smith - Percussion
- Norris Lytton - Bass guitar
- Glenn Cambell - Sound engineer
- Tom Cossie - Assistant producer

== Reception ==
"Asphalt Mother" continues to survive on its own more than four decades after it was recorded, despite never having been promoted. It is played on FM radio, and appears on 60s compilation CDs, pirated discs, internet radio, and BitTorrents.
