= Demiricous =

American death/thrash metal band

- Origin: Indianapolis, Indiana
- Genres: Thrash metal; death metal
- Years active: 2001–present
- Label: Metal Blade
- Members: Nate Olp; Dustin Boltjes; Scott Wilson; Ben Parrish

Demiricous is a death/thrash metal band from Indianapolis, Indiana, formed by Nate Olp, Scott Wilson, Ben Parrish (of Upheaval), and Christopher Cruz.

In 2008, Scott Bronner (MercyKill, Legion) joined the band to replace Wilson, and Mike Morgan (Summon The Destroyer, Christ Beheaded) replaced Parrish. After a long hiatus, Wilson and Parrish returned and recorded the band's third full-length album, III: Chaotic Lethal. The album was released in May 2022.

== History ==
It has been stated that the band's name, Demiricous, has no meaning and is a made-up word. In 2005, they self-released a demo that caught the attention of Metal Blade label. After the release of their first album, Cruz left the band and Dustin Boltjes replaced him.

Their debut album, One (Hellbound), was recorded and mixed at Planet-Z Studios with Zeuss (Hatebreed, The Red Chord, Shadows Fall) in June 2005, and released later that year. Following the release, the band toured with Himsa in late 2006. They reportedly earned them the respect and praise of thrash metal band Slayer.

Their follow-up album, Two (Poverty), was released in 2007 by Metal Blade Records. The band is featured on the bonus disc of Byzantine's Salvation DVD, in a segment entitled "Shoe Fight", filmed in September 2006 when the two bands were on tour together.

On February 2, 2022, the band announced that their third album would be titled III: Chaotic Lethal. It was released on May 13, their first album in over 14 years.

On March 6, 2023, guitarist Scott Wilson, who was a high school classmate of Jared Fogle, appeared in Jared from Subway: Catching A Monster as himself.

== Style ==
Demiricous has been compared to another thrash metal band, Slayer, recognized by their "galloping rhythms, repetitive riffs, fast tempos, and screamed vocals".

== Members ==
- Nate Olp - vocals, bass
- Ben Parrish - guitar
- Scott Wilson - guitar
- Chris Cruz - drums

== Discography ==
- One (Hellbound) (2006)
- Two (Poverty) (2007)
- III: Chaotic Lethal (2022)
