= Jeremiad: A Video by Donnie Searls =

Jeremiad: The cover of Byzantines's 2005 "Mini-DVD".

Jeremiad is a "Mini-DVD" released in 2005 from West Virginia heavy metal band Byzantine via the production company, Atma (now known as Every Second Pictures). The disc's purpose was to showcase the band's music video for the song "Jeremiad", the third song, and only single, off of their 2005 album ...And They Shall Take Up Serpents. The video was directed and co-produced by Donnie Searls. The DVD had only a limited pressing.

== Chapters ==
1. Jeremiad (music video)
2. Deleted Scenes
3. Funeral Home Outtake
4. Photographs
5. Tour of 101 Studios
6. Salvation Trailer

=== Description of Chapters ===
1. Music video for the song "Jeremiad" directed by Donnie Searls.
2. Deleted Scenes from the music video.
3. Funeral Home Video (Band Performance For Music Video) Outtakes.
4. Twenty-Four band promotional photographs (constructed as a video collage with the song "Taking Up Serpents" playing in the background).
5. Tour of 101 Studios with OJ (studio where the 2004 album, The Fundamental Component and the 2005 album, ...And They Shall Take Up Serpents were recorded).
6. Trailer for the upcoming full-length DVD Salvation: The Making of Serpents.

=== Easter Eggs ===
There are three easter eggs included on the DVD, each a behind the scenes look at the making of the "Jeremiad" music video.
