= Dark Covenant =

- Origin: St-Eustache, Quebec, Canada
- Genre: Doom metal
- Years active: 2009–present
- Label: EMANES Metal Records
- Members: Christian Verreault; Stephane Verreault; Yves Allaire
- Past members: Jonathan Hamel
- Website: darkcovenantdoom.com

Dark Covenant is a doom metal band from Canada. based in Quebec. They are signed to France's Emanes Metal Records. Their influences are mainly old-school doom the likes of Candlemass and Solitude Aeturnus.

== History ==
Yves Allaire and Christian Verreault, who had known each other for many years, came together with Christian's brother Stephane to form Dark Covenant in 2009. That year they released a demo CD, which collected positive comments, including a review in Power Metal magazine and a No. 1 position in Metallian Magazine's Top 10 list of Winter 2009/10.

The trio released their first full-length album in 2011, Eulogies for the Fallen, on French label EMANES Metal Records. The album was well received, although criticized for lack of variety among the tracks; the style has been described as slow-paced and melancholy, with operatic vocals.

== Discography ==
- Dark Covenant (demo) (2009)
- Eulogies for the Fallen (2011)

== Members ==
- Christian Verreault - vocals
- Yves Allaire - guitars, keyboards, drums, artwork
- Stephane Verreault - bass

=== Former members ===
- Jonathan Hamel - drums

== See also ==
- Music of Canada
- Canadian rock
- List of bands from Canada
