= The Mothman of Point Pleasant =

2017 American documentary film

- Promotional release poster by Sam Shearon
- Directed by: Seth Breedlove
- Written by: Lyle Blackburn; Seth Breedlove
- Produced by: Seth Breedlove
- Narrated by: Lyle Blackburn
- Cinematography: Zac Palmisano
- Edited by: Seth Breedlove
- Music by: Brandon Dalo
- Production company: Small Town Monsters
- Release date: May 27, 2017 (Point Pleasant)
- Running time: 67 minutes
- Country: United States
- Language: English

The Mothman of Point Pleasant is a 2017 American documentary film about the Mothman, a purported humanoid creature reportedly sighted in the area of Point Pleasant, West Virginia. Directed, produced, and edited by Seth Breedlove, the film is the fourth documentary by his production company Small Town Monsters.

The Mothman of Point Pleasant was followed by a sequel, The Mothman Legacy, in 2020.

== Production ==
Filming on The Mothman of Point Pleasant began in September 2016. On February 2, 2017, the filmmakers launched a campaign on the crowdfunding website Kickstarter to cover post-production costs. Rewards for supporting the Kickstarter campaign included a Mothman statue designed and sculpted by Jean St. Jean and produced by CreatuReplica; a T-shirt featuring artwork by Sam Shearon; a poster featuring artwork by Matt Harris; and a DVD copy of the film.

== Release ==
The Mothman of Point Pleasant screened at the Lowe Hotel in Point Pleasant on May 27, 2017. The film was made available for streaming on Vimeo, Amazon Prime Video, and iTunes on June 2, 2017. It debuted on the Syfy channel in February 2018.

== Sequel ==
A sequel, The Mothman Legacy, also directed by Breedlove and produced by Small Town Monsters, was released in 2020. The Mothman Legacy explores alleged Mothman sightings dating from the 1960s to 2019, and that occurred outside of Point Pleasant, namely elsewhere in West Virginia, as well as Kentucky and the greater Appalachian region.
