= Into the Depths of Sorrow =

Studio album by Solitude Aeturnus
- Released: 1991
- Studio: Dallas Sound Lab
- Genre: Epic doom metal
- Length: 47:39
- Label: Roadrunner
- Producer: Danny Brown, Solitude Aeturnus

Solitude Aeturnus chronology
Into the Depths of Sorrow (1991)	Beyond the Crimson Horizon (1992)

Professional ratings
Review scores
Source	Rating
AllMusic	4.5/5 stars

Into the Depths of Sorrow is the debut album by American doom metal band Solitude Aeturnus. It was released by Roadrunner Records in 1991.

The album was reissued by Brainticket Records in 2004, featuring bonus tracks taken from the band's Demo 1989 tape and a previously unreleased rehearsal tape.

== Track listing ==
No.	Title	Writer(s)	Lyrics	Length
1.	"Dawn of Antiquity (A Return to Despair)"			1:02
2.	"Opaque Divinity"	John Perez	Lyle Steadham	6:24
3.	"Transcending Sentinels"	Perez	Kristoff Gabehart	7:35
4.	"Dream of Immortality"	Perez, Edgar Rivera, Robert Lowe	Steadham	7:52
5.	"Destiny Falls to Ruin"	Perez	Steadham	5:05
6.	"White Ship"	Steadham, Perez	Steadham	6:10
7.	"Mirror of Sorrow"	Perez	Steadham	7:37
8.	"Where Angels Dare to Tread"	Perez	Gabehart	5:56

2004 reissue bonus tracks
No.	Title	Notes	Length
9.	"Opaque Divinity"	Demo recorded in 1989	6:28
10.	"Mirror of Sorrow"	Demo recorded in 1988	7:34
11.	"City of Armageddon"	Rehearsal recorded c. 1991; previously unreleased	5:53

== Personnel ==
=== Solitude Aeturnus ===
- Robert Lowe – vocals, keyboards
- Edgar Rivera – guitar
- John Perez – guitar, vocals on track 1
- Lyle Steadham – bass, vocals on track 1
- John Covington – drums

=== Additional personnel ===
- Tim Kimsey – additional vocals (track 1)
- Chris Hardin – bass (tracks 9–10)
- Tom Martinez – guitar (track 10)
