= Byzantine (album) =

Studio album by Byzantine
- Released: February 26, 2013
- Genre: Groove metal, thrash metal, progressive metal
- Length: 44:40
- Label: Self-released

Byzantine chronology
Oblivion Beckons (2008)	Byzantine (2013)	To Release Is to Resolve (2015)

Byzantine is the fourth studio album by American heavy metal band Byzantine. The album was partially crowdfunded through Kickstarter and was released on February 26, 2013,

On November 28, 2012, the band premiered the first single from the album, "Signal Path", on MetalSucks. The second single and accompanying music video for "Soul Eraser" premiered on January 11, 2013, on No Clean Singing.

== Track listing ==
No.	Title	Length
1.	"Which Light Shall Never Penetrate"	5:16
2.	"Soul Eraser"	4:44
3.	"Efficacy"	5:23
4.	"Forged in the Heart of a Dying Star"	5:41
5.	"Caldera"	5:08
6.	"Signal Path"	5:00
7.	"Everything I Touch Bursts into Flame"	4:17
8.	"Posthumous"	5:48
9.	"Pathogen"	3:23

== Personnel ==
- Chris "OJ" Ojeda – vocals, guitar
- Tony Rohrbough – lead guitar
- Michael "Skip" Cromer – bass
- Matt Wolfe – drums

== Singles ==
- "Signal Path"
- "Soul Eraser"
