= Alone (Solitude Aeturnus album) =

Studio album by Solitude Aeturnus
- Released: November 10, 2006
- Recorded: June–August 2006
- Studio: Nomad Studios (Carrollton, Texas)
- Genre: Epic doom metal
- Length: 70:45
- Label: Massacre Records
- Producer: Solitude Aeturnus

Solitude Aeturnus chronology
Adagio (1998)	Alone (2006)

Professional ratings
Review scores
Source	Rating
Blabbermouth.net	(10/10)
AllMusic	3/5 stars

Alone is the sixth, and to date, final album by American doom metal band Solitude Aeturnus, released in November 2006. The album cover was created by Travis Smith.

== Track listing ==
All music by Solitude Aeturnus. All lyrics by Robert Lowe, except "Lucid Destitution" by Heather Hunt.

1. "Scent of Death" – 9:42
2. "Waiting for the Light" – 4:41
3. "Blessed Be the Dead" – 5:03
4. "Sightless" – 4:24
5. "Upon Within" – 7:56
6. "Burning" – 8:42
7. "Is There" – 8:01
8. "Tomorrows Dead" – 6:26
9. "Essence of Black" – 5:35
10. "Lucid Destitution" – 10:10 (bonus track on digipak edition)

The track "Lucid Destitution" was originally titled "Embrace" but changed at the last minute.

== Credits ==
- John Perez – guitars
- Robert Lowe – vocals and keyboards
- Steve Moseley – guitar
- James Martin – bass
- Steve Nichols – drums
- Jason Spradlin – tamboura on "Scent of Death"
- Paul Morgan – photography
- Solitude Aeturnus – production
- Sterling Winfield – engineering
- J.T. Longoria – engineering, mix engineering
- Greg Adams – assistant engineering
- Gary long – mastering
