= Caustic Eye Productions =

- Founded: 2001
- Founder: Rod Lanham
- Genre: Various
- Location: Charleston, West Virginia, United States

Caustic Eye Productions is a small record label and promotions company founded in August of 2001 near Charleston, West Virginia by Rod Lanham. Caustic Eye functions as the liaison between the artist and the production facility, or in the case of limited edition titles, assembles the product in house. All rights of the works are retained by the artists themselves. In addition to the catalogued releases, Caustic Eye has assisted bands with promotional CDs and other co-released projects. The genres featured can vary from Heavy Metal (Byzantine) to Alt-Country (Jeff Ellis) to Psychedelic Rock (Mind Garage) and Doom/Drone (Hyatari).

== Releases ==
- CAUS001 ::: The Fringe - "Electro-Space Orchestration Volume One: Understanding Song Structure"
- CAUS002 ::: Byzantine - "Byzantine" (a.k.a. 2000-2001 Demos)
- CAUS002B ::: Byzantine - "Byzantine" (a.k.a. 2000-2001 Demos - 2003 Re-Issue)
- CAUS003 ::: Against - "Spiritual Technology"
- CAUS004 ::: David White - "Sci-Fi Guitar"
- CAUS005 ::: Guinness Clarke's Wine - "Guinness Clarke's Wine"
- CAUS006 ::: David White - "A Different Approach"
- CAUS007 ::: David White - "Urbanite"
- CAUS008 ::: Jeff Ellis and Guinness Clarke's Wine - "Next Big Thing"
- CAUS009 ::: Jeff Ellis - "The Enemy"
- CAUS010 ::: Jeff Ellis - "Demo Sessions Vol. 1: Broadmoor"
- CAUS011 ::: Jeff Ellis - "Demo Sessions Vol. 2: Greensboro"
- CAUS012 ::: Stone Ka-Tet - "Stone Ka-Tet"
- CAUS013 ::: V/A - "Guilty By Association: Five Years of Caustic Eye"
- CAUS014 ::: The Burt Reynolds Death Metal Experiment - "The Definitive Collection - Vol. 2"
- CAUS015 ::: Guinness Clarke's Wine - "Live Bootleg"
- CAUS016 ::: Jeff Ellis - "All Masters Will Serve"
- CAUS017 ::: Mind Garage - "S/T + Again"
- CAUS018 ::: Jeff Ellis - "A Front Seat for the End of the World"
- CAUS019 ::: Jeff Ellis - "Gospel Sessions Volume 1"
- CAUS020 ::: Maximum Headlessness - "Songs To Sleep To"
- CAUS021 ::: Bud Carroll and the Southern Souls - "S/T EP"
- CAUS022 ::: Jeff Ellis - "Covering the Distance"
- CAUS023 ::: Hyatari - "They Will Surface"
- CAUS024 ::: Kevin Arbogast - "Soul Singin'"
- CAUS025 ::: Bad Employees - "Looking For Werk"
- CAUS026 ::: The Demon Beat / Bud Carroll and the Southern Souls - "Split EP"
- CAUS027 ::: The Scrap Iron Pickers - "Redeeming Metal / Union"
- CAUS028 ::: Bud Carroll and the Southern Souls - "Wasted Words and Best Intentions"
- CAUS029 ::: Bud Carroll and the Southern Souls - "Paramount Arts Center 1.31.08 DVD"

== See also ==
- List of record labels
