= Mind Garage Early Years =

Mind Garage-Early Years A Total Electric Happening

Studio album by Mind Garage
- Released: April 26, 2006
- Recorded: July, 1968 at Glenn Cambell Studio Pittsburgh, Pa; August, 1968 at Bell Sound Studio Long Island, NY
- Genre: Psychedelic rock
- Length: 36.03 minutes
- Label: Morning Glori Music
- Producer: Mind Garage

Singles from Mind Garage-Early Years A Total Electric Happening
- 1. "Asphalt Mother" Released: August 1968

Mind Garage-Early Years (A Total Electric Happening) was recorded by the Mind Garage, the first hard rock band recognized nationally as a Christian Rock band when America tuned into a Christian rock worship service in 1969 on ABC TV. The song, "Water" was used in the service. The term "Christian rock" had not yet been coined in 1968 and these compositions can be considered the missing link between secular and Christian rock music.

== History ==
The group's purpose was to make a demonstration record to interest a recording company in signing the group. Seven of the songs were recorded at Glen Campbell Studio in Pittsburgh, Pa. Asphalt Mother and Reach Out were recorded the same year, 1968, at Bell Sound Studio, Long Island, New York and released on the Morning Glori Music label as a 45 RPM single. The remaining tracks were not released until 2006, 38 years later.

The band received several 33 1/3 rpm acetates of the Glenn Cambell Session to be used as demos but the studio kept the master tape. One of the demos accomplished the purpose of getting the band signed to RCA and commercially packaged records of the session were never ordered. The master tape was used again and recorded over as was the custom in many small studios in the 60s. Except for a brief appearance in 1983, when five cassette tapes were made from the only known remaining acetate, the acetate and the cassettes remained out of sight, and out of mind.

The acetate itself was lost sometime during the next 21 years but, in 2004, one of the cassettes surfaced and a CD was made from it. It was remastered twice to improve the sound, but the quality was inferior. Late in 2005 a cassette of vastly better sound quality appeared in the possession of Evan Jones, who had received one of the five original cassettes, and the CD was remastered again by Rick Ravenscroft of Rave Cave Records.

== Track listing ==
(All pre RCA songs except "Reach Out" and "B-52" are credited to the Larry McClurg or John Vaughan. Once signed with RCA, "What Shall We Do Till Norris Comes", "Circus Farm" and all future songs were credited to the Mind Garage collectively.)

1. "B-52" (Norris Lytton, Jack Bond, Ted Smith, John Vauhghan) - .53
2. "Sale of a Deathman" (John Vaughan) - 3:52
3. "What Shall We Do Till Norris Comes" (Larry McClurg) - 6:27
4. "Water" (Larry McClurg) - 4:53
5. "Star Goddess" (John Vaughan) - 3:10
6. "Circus Farm" (Larry McClurg) - 2:45
7. "This Town" (Larry McClurg) - 4:06
8. "Reach Out" (Holland-Dozier-Holland - 4:58
9. "Asphalt Mother" (Larry McClurg) - 5:06

== Personnel ==
=== Performers ===
- Larry McClurg - lead vocals, background vocals
- John Vaughan - lead guitar
- Ted Smith - drums, background vocals
- Jack Bond - keyboard, background vocals
- Norris Lytton -bass guitar, background vocals

=== Additional personnel ===
- Mind Garage band - Producers
- Tom Cossie - Assistant Producer
- Glen Cambell - Mastering, Recording engineer at Glenn Cambell Studio
- Bell Sound Studio - unknown recording engineers
- Rave Records - Re-Mastering by Rick Ravenscroft
- Cover Art - Maurice Griffin
- Bob Campione - Photography
- Cover Layout - Rick Ravenscroft, Rod Lanham
