= The Bray Road Beast (film) =

2018 American documentary film

- Promotional release poster by Adrienne Breedlove
- Directed by: Seth Breedlove
- Written by: Seth Breedlove; Mark Matzke
- Produced by: Adrienne Breedlove; Seth Breedlove
- Narrated by: Lyle Blackburn
- Cinematography: Zac Palmisano
- Edited by: Seth Breedlove
- Music by: Brandon Dalo; Chris Dudley
- Production company: Small Town Monsters
- Release date: October 5, 2018
- Running time: 66 minutes
- Country: United States
- Language: English

The Bray Road Beast is a 2018 American documentary film about the Beast of Bray Road, a purported humanoid wolf-like creature allegedly sighted in Elkhorn, Walworth County, Wisconsin. Directed and co-produced by Seth Breedlove, the film is the seventh documentary by his production company Small Town Monsters. It is narrated by Lyle Blackburn and features both animated sequences and live-action reenactments of alleged sightings of the titular cryptid. The music for the film was composed by Brandon Dalo and Underoath member Chris Dudley.

The Bray Road Beast was released on DVD and streaming services on October 5, 2018.

== Production ==
The Bray Road Beast was financed in part by a crowdfunding campaign on the website Kickstarter, which production company Small Town Monsters launched in February 2018 in order to raise funds for both The Bray Road Beast and two other documentaries, The Flatwoods Monster: A Legacy of Fear and On the Trail of Champ.

== Release and reception ==
The Bray Road Beast was released on DVD and streaming services on October 5, 2018. It later screened at the 14th annual Texas Frightmare Weekend in May 2019.

A reviewer for Wisconsin Frights wrote positively of the documentary, comparing its visual style to that of Hammer Horror films and calling it "unnerving and completely fascinating." Christine Burnham of PopHorror referred to the film as "overall interesting", though she criticized the special effects used to portray the titular creature as "crude and [...] a little silly".
