= Mitsuki =

- Pronunciation: Japanese: [mi.ts(ɯᵝ).ki]
- Gender: Unisex, predominantly female

Origin
- Meaning: It has many different meanings depending on the kanji used

Mitsuki (みつき, ミツキ) is the Japanese word for "three months" (三月). It is also a Japanese given name natively written in a variety of forms. While a unisex name, it is more commonly used by women.

== Written forms ==
Mitsuki can be written using different kanji characters and can mean:

- 三月, "three months"

as a given name

- 満月, "full, moon"
- 美月, "beauty, moon"
- 光月, "light, moon"
- 光希, "light, rare"
- 光揮, "light, wield"
- 光輝, "light, brightness"
- 充喜, "raise, rejoice"
- 参月, "three, moon"
- 参輝, "three, shine"

The name can also be written in hiragana or katakana.

== People ==
with the given name Mitsuki

- Mitsuki Aira (ミツキ; born 1988), a Japanese techno-pop artist
- Mitsuki Endo (三貴; born 1992), a Japanese singer (former Kamen Rider Girls)
- Mitsuki Ichihara (充喜; born 1986), a Japanese footballer
- Mitsuki Koga (光揮; born 1975), a Japanese actor
- Mitsuki Oishi (参月; born 1988), a Japanese fashion model and actress
- Mitsuki Saiga (みつき; born 1973), a Japanese voice actress
- Mitsuki Saito (未月; born 1999), a Japanese footballer
- Mitsuki Sumoto (光希; born 2001), a Japanese figure skater
- Mitsuki Takahata (充希; born 1991), a Japanese actress and singer
- Mitsuki Tanimura (美月; born 1990), a Japanese actress
- Mitsuki Watanabe (三城; born 1987), Japanese footballer
- Mitski (born 1990), Japanese-American musician
- Mizyu (born 1998), a member of the Japanese idol group Atarashii Gakko!

== Fictional characters ==
With the given name Mitsuki

- Mitsuki, a character in the American animated sitcom Kappa Mikey
- Mitsuki, a minor character in the anime series Tenchi Universe
- Mitsuki, a character in the manga series Tokyo Babylon
- Mitsuki, the official mascot of Tsubasacon
- Mitsuki Aoyagi (美月), a character in the tokusatsu series Unofficial Sentai Akibaranger
- Mitsuki Bakugo (爆豪), a character in the manga series My Hero Academia
- Mitsuki Hayase (水月), a character in the adventure game and anime series Kimi ga Nozomu Eien
- Mitsuki Koyama (満月), a character in the manga and anime series Full Moon o Sagashite
- Mitsuki Rara (みつき), a character in the anime series Dual! Parallel Trouble Adventure
- Mitsuki Sanada (三月), a character in the anime series Dual! Parallel Trouble Adventure
- Mitsuki Sawatari (みつき), a character in the manga and anime series He Is My Master
- Mitsuki Yamamoto, a character in the game series Corpse Party
- Mitsuki Koga (美月), a character in the manga and anime series The Guy She Was Interested in Wasn't a Guy at All
- Mitsuki Nase (美月), a character in the anime series Kyoukai no Kanata
- Mitsuki Kanzaki (美月), a character in the anime series Recently, My Sister Is Unusual
- Mitsuki Hoshikawa (みつき), a character in the anime series Himitsu no AiPri
- Mitsuki (Naruto) (巳月), a character in the manga series Boruto: Naruto Next Generations
- Mitsuki Izumi (三月), a character in the mobile game and anime franchise IDOLiSH7
- Mitsuki Sonoda (美月), a character in the manga series Sakura Trick

with the surname Mitsuki

- Sohara Mitsuki (見月), a character in the manga series Heaven's Lost Property
