= Rails & Ales Festival =

Annual beer festival

Rails & Ales
- Status: Active
- Genre: Beer festival
- Date: Second Saturday in August
- Frequency: Annually
- Locations: Huntington, West Virginia
- Country: US
- Years active: 12–13
- Attendance: 8,000 (2019)
- Website: Official website

The Rails & Ales Festival is a yearly beer festival held in Huntington, West Virginia. The festival showcases craft beers from local and regional breweries, alongside live music, food trucks, and an artisan market.

No festival was held in 2020.

The inaugural Rails & Ales Festival, hosted by the Better Beer Coalition, was held at the Huntington station and drew 750 attendees. The following years it has been hosted at Harris Riverfront Park.

In 2026, the festival was the runner up for the USA Today best beer festival.

== See also ==
- List of festivals in West Virginia
