= Salvation (Byzantine video album) =

Salvation is a DVD that was released April 17, 2007, from West Virginia heavy metal band Byzantine via Prosthetic Records. It was filmed, directed, and edited by Donnie Searls, owner of Every Second Pictures. Shortly after release, any copy purchased from the band included a bonus DVD with content that wasn't able to fit on the main disc.

Salvation: The cover of Byzantines's 2007 DVD.

== DVD contents ==
- Interviews with the band and the album producers (pre and post Serpents)
- Long-form live video consisting of six songs and a storyline setting up the plot for the song "Jeremiad"; the songlist consists of:
1. Kill Chain
2. Taking Up Serpents
3. Stick Figure
4. Salem Ark
5. Red Neck War
6. Cradle Song
- Five live bootleg performances:
1. Hatfield (recorded January 1, 2006 @ The Sound Factory)
2. Stoning Judas (recorded January 1, 2006 @ The Sound Factory)
3. Slipping on Noise (recorded January 1, 2006 @ The Sound Factory)
4. Five Faces of Madness (recorded January 1, 2006 @ The Sound Factory)
5. Justicia (recorded February 12, 2006 @ The Nanci Raygun)
- Bass and guitar tutorials
- On the road, behind the scenes footage
- "Jeremiad" music video
- In-studio footage, the making of the 2005 album ...And They Shall Take Up Serpents

=== Bonus disc ===
- The Knee Injury
- Transportation Issue
- Wheelchair Shenanigans
- Shoe Fight (feat. Demiricous)
- Bad Milk
