= Through the Darkest Hour =

Studio album by Solitude Aeturnus
- Released: 1994
- Recorded: May 1994
- Studio: Rhythm Studios, England
- Genre: Epic doom metal
- Label: Pavement
- Producer: Paul Johnston & Solitude Aeturnus

Solitude Aeturnus chronology
Beyond the Crimson Horizon (1992)	Through the Darkest Hour (1994)	Downfall (1996)

Professional ratings
Review scores
Source	Rating
AllMusic	3/5 stars

Through the Darkest Hour is the third album by American doom metal band Solitude Aeturnus. It was re-released as a double-CD with Downfall.

== Track listing ==
1. "Falling" (4:08)
2. "Haunting the Obscure" (5:31)
3. "The 8th Day: Mourning" (6:07)
4. "The 9th Day: Awakening" (5:03)
5. "Pain" (7:06)
6. "Pawns of Anger" (6:36)
7. "Eternal (Dreams Part II)" (7:51)
8. "Perfect Insanity" (6:15)
9. "Shattered My Spirits" (8:27)

== Credits ==
- Robert Lowe – vocals, keyboards
- Edgar Rivera – guitars
- John Perez – guitars
- Lyle Steadham – bass
- John Covington – drums

Production

- Produced by Solitude Aeturnus & Paul Johnston
- Recorded May 1994 at Rhythm Studios in Bidford on Avon, Warwickshire, England
- Engineered by Paul "Gov'ner" Johnston
- Mastered at Monsterdisc in Chicago
- Cover art by Leilah Wendell
- Photography by Stu Taylor
- Layout and design by IQ Talent
