= Minerva Monster =

2015 American documentary film

- Promotional release poster
- Directed by: Seth Breedlove
- Written by: Seth Breedlove
- Produced by: Jesse Morgan; Alan Megargle
- Cinematography: Jesse Morgan
- Music by: Brandon Dalo
- Production company: Small Town Monsters
- Release date: May 16, 2015 (Lore City)
- Running time: 54 minutes
- Country: United States
- Language: English
- Budget: $500 (est.)

Minerva Monster is a 2015 American documentary film written and directed by Seth Breedlove, about the purported sightings of an alleged Bigfoot-like creature around the town of Minerva, in Paris Township, Stark County, Ohio, in 1978. The first in a series of cryptid-related documentaries produced by Breedlove's production company Small Town Monsters, the film features interviews with law enforcement, media officials, and supposed witnesses of the titular creature.

Minerva Monster premiered at the Ohio Bigfoot Conference in Lore City, Ohio's Salt Fork State Park, on May 16, 2015.

== Synopsis ==
Minerva Monster explores a series of alleged sightings of a purported Bigfoot-like cryptid around the town of Minerva, in Paris Township, Stark County, Ohio, in August 1978. It features interviews with supposed witnesses of the creature, including members of the Cayton family (including claimed eyewitness Howe Cayton), former Akron Beacon Journal reporter Barbara Galloway, and Stark County Sherriff's deputy James Shannon.

== Production ==
According to director Breedlove, production on Minerva Monster began in September 2014. The film was shot and edited over the course of eight months.

Minerva Monster was filmed using a $3,000 Sony camcorder, on a budget of around US$500. A crowdfunding campaign for the film on Kickstarter raised an additional $6,515. In a 2015 interview, Breedlove stated that, "There was no real budget to speak of. We put money into things like equipment and gas and chartered a plane to fly us over Minerva for aerial shots."

== Release ==
Minerva Monster premiered at the Ohio Bigfoot Conference in the Salt Fork Lodge and Conference Center in Lore City, Ohio's Salt Fork State Park, on May 16, 2015.

On June 4, 2015, the film was screened at the Minerva Public Library. On June 6, the Minerva Area Chamber of Commerce held a "Minerva Monster Day" event, offering free screenings of the film at Minerva's Roxy Theatre. On June 25, the film was shown at the Wadsworth Public Library.

A fifth-anniversary screening of Minerva Monster was scheduled to be held on March 21, 2020, at the Palace Theatre in Canton, Ohio, followed by a screening of another Small Town Monsters-produced film, The Flatwoods Monster: A Legacy of Fear (2018), and a premiere of On the Trail of UFOs; the event was canceled by March 17, 2020.

=== Home media ===
The film was released on DVD and Blu-ray; copies of the film on either format were available for purchase at the film's premiere at the Ohio Bigfoot Conference in Lore City. It was also made available to rent and stream or purchase and download on Vimeo.

== Critical reception ==
In a review of the film for Massillon, Ohio's The Independent, Robert McCune wrote that, while the filmmakers do not offer commentary of their own, "Their bias shows in whom they didn't put in front of the camera: the naysayers and critics. [...] if you don't go into this documentary believing in Bigfoot, there likely is nothing here that is going to change your mind." Despite this, he called the film "thoughtfully produced and edited", and wrote that "it tells an interesting story well".
