= Beyond the Crimson Horizon =

Studio album by Solitude Aeturnus
- Released: August 1992
- Genre: Epic doom metal
- Length: 43:20
- Label: Roadrunner
- Producers: Solitude Aeturnus, Danny Brown

Solitude Aeturnus chronology
Into the Depths of Sorrow (1991)	Beyond the Crimson Horizon (1992)	Through the Darkest Hour (1994)

Professional ratings
Review scores
Source	Rating
AllMusic	4.5/5 stars

Beyond the Crimson Horizon is the second album by American doom metal band Solitude Aeturnus. It was released by Roadrunner Records.

== Track listing ==
- Music by Solitude Aeturnus. Lyrics by Lyle Steadham, except where noted.
1. "Seeds of the Desolate" – 6:30
2. "Black Castle" – 4:08
3. "The Final Sin" – 5:41
4. "It Came Upon One Night" – 6:57 (lyrics: Kristoff Gabeheart)
5. "The Hourglass" – 5:17
6. "Beneath the Fading Sun" – 4:26
7. "Plague of Procreation" – 6:27
8. "Beyond..." – 4:00

2006 reissue bonus tracks

9. "City of Armageddon (Demo Late 1991)" – 7:39
10. "It Came Upon One Night (Demo January 1988)" – 5:55

== Personnel ==
- Robert Lowe – vocals, keyboards, synthesizers
- Edgar Rivera – guitars
- John Perez – guitars
- Lyle Steadham – bass
- John Covington – drums

Production

- Arranged by Solitude Aeturnus
- Produced by Solitude Aeturnus & Danny Brown
- Engineered and mixed by Tim Grugle & Danny Brown

== Charts ==
=== Monthly ===
Year	Chart	Position
2007	Poland (ZPAV Top 100)	100
