= To Release Is to Resolve =

Studio album by Byzantine
- Released: April 7, 2015
- Genre: Groove metal, thrash metal, progressive metal
- Length: 43:23 (original release); 52:00 (European release)
- Label: Self-released
- Producer: Jay Hannon

Byzantine chronology
Byzantine (2013)	To Release Is to Resolve (2015)

Professional ratings
Review scores
Source	Rating
About.com	4.5/5 stars
Damnation Magazine	4.75/5 stars
PureGrainAudio	9/10 stars

To Release Is to Resolve is the fifth album by American heavy metal band Byzantine, released independently on April 7, 2015. Out of four members of this band, only two returned from their previous album, lead vocalist Chris "OJ" Ojeda and drummer Matt Wolfe.

The first song of this album, "A Curious Lot", was streamed on February 3, 2015.

The album would be re-released by the band in Europe on August 5, 2016, containing the original track list as well as two new cover songs, "Dam That River" (originally performed by Alice in Chains), and "Pisschrist" (originally performed by Fear Factory).

== Track listing ==
Original release
No.	Title	Length
1.	"Scold's Bride"	5:42
2.	"Justinian Code"	8:08
3.	"A Curious Lot"	3:49
4.	"The Agonies"	4:39
5.	"God Forsaken"	5:57
6.	"You Sleep, We Wake"	4:48
7.	"To Release"	6:27
8.	"To Resolve"	3:53
Total length:		43:23

European release
No.	Title	Length
9.	"Dam That River" (Alice in Chains cover)	3:09
10.	"Pisschrist" (Fear Factory cover)	5:28
Total length:		52:00

== Personnel ==
- Chris "OJ" Ojeda – vocals, guitars
- Matt Wolfe – drums
- Brian "Hendo" Henderson – guitars
- Sean Sydnor – bass
