= Adagio (Solitude Aeturnus album) =

Studio album by Solitude Aeturnus
- Released: 3 August 1998
- Recorded: 1997–1998
- Genre: Epic doom metal
- Length: 63:01
- Label: Massacre Records
- Producers: Paul Johnston & Solitude Aeturnus

Solitude Aeturnus chronology
Downfall (1996)	Adagio (1998)	Alone (2006)

Professional ratings
Review scores
Source	Rating
AllMusic	2/5 stars
Scream Magazine	5/6

Adagio is the fifth album by American doom metal band Solitude Aeturnus.

== Track listing ==
1. "My Endtime" – 0:48
2. "Days of Prayer" – 6:10
3. "Believe" – 5:52
4. "Never" – 2:53
5. "Idis" – 5:41
6. "Personal God" – 5:01
7. "Mental Pictures" – 4:57
8. "Insanity's Circles" – 6:05
9. "The Fall" – 2:28
10. "Lament" – 5:43
11. "Empty Faith" – 3:58
12. "Spiral Descent" – 7:09
13. "Heaven and Hell" – 6:13 (Black Sabbath cover)

== Credits ==
- Robert Lowe – vocals, guitars and bass on track 6 & 11
- Edgar Rivera – guitars
- John Perez – guitars, vocals on "The Fall"
- Steve Moseley – bass, guitar solo on "Idis"
- John Covington – drums

Production

- Recorded at Rhythm Studios, Bidford On Avon, UK, April 1998
- Produced by Solitude Aeturnus and Paul Johnston
- Engineered by Paul Jonston
- Mastered by Alexander Krull at Mastersound
- Artwork and design by Travis Smith
- Photos by Jax Smith
