= Ghoultown =

American rock band

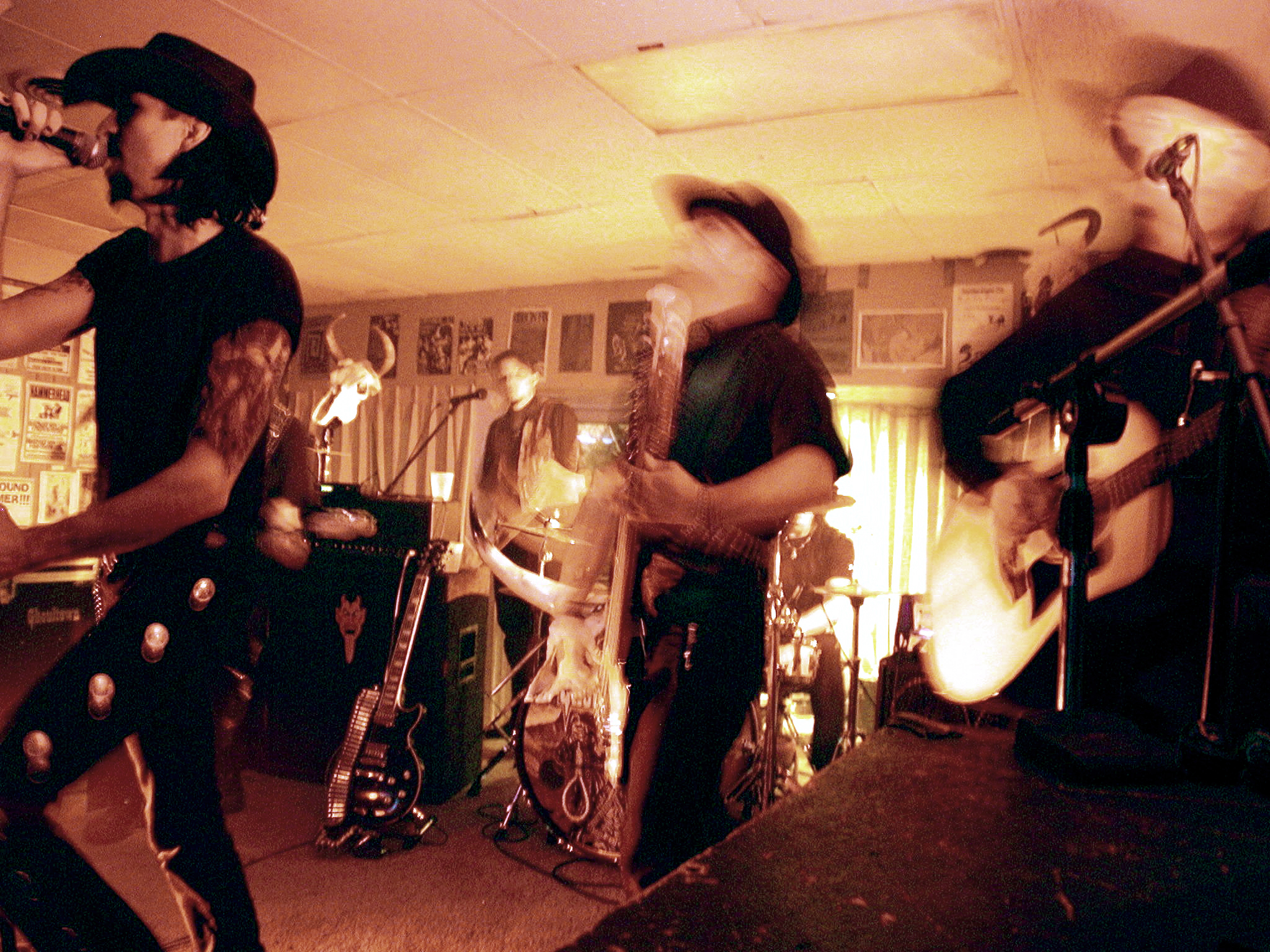
- Ghoultown at Ralph's Corner

Background information
- Origin: Dallas, Texas, U.S.
- Genres: Psychobilly, gothic country, heavy metal, horror punk
- Years active: 1999–present
- Label: Angry Planet Records
- Members: Count Lyle; Jake Middlefinger; Lizard Lazario; Santi; Logan Cade
- Past members: Queeno DeVamps; X-Ray Charles; Dez Black; J. Luis; Dalton Black; Randy Grimm; Lew Lazario

Ghoultown is an American rock band from Dallas, Texas, formed in 1999. AllMusic describes the group's music as "punk rock, Western stylings, mariachi, and a dose of B-movie trappings." The band has released six studio albums to date, plus an EP and live album.

== History ==
Formed in 1999 by vocalist/guitarist Count Lyle, previously of Solitude Aeturnus, Ghoultown recorded its first three-song EP, Boots of Hell, in October of the same year. Tracks from the EP were included on compilations including Gothabilly 2: Rockin' Necropolis, released by New York's Skully Records, for which the band performed at the release party at CBGB on Halloween 2000.

In early 2001, Ghoultown released their debut album, Tales from the Dead West, produced by Kol Marshall. In 2002, four of the band's songs were chosen for the soundtrack of the horror film American Nightmare, starring Debbie Rochon. The movie script was subsequently altered to include a cameo performance from Ghoultown, and the video for their track "Killer In Texas" was included as a bonus on the DVD.

In the spring of 2002, the band released their follow-up Give 'Em More Rope, and Angry Planet Records signed a licensing deal with Netherlands-based Corazong Records to release the band's U.S. catalog in Europe and Canada. The first Euro-Canadian release was a special edition of Tales from the Dead West, which also included tracks from the Boots of Hell EP. In the late summer, Ghoultown did a 35 date U.S. tour, which included performances at New York's CBGBs and The Garage in Los Angeles. The tour was concluded by a performance at Dragon Con in Atlanta.

In 2003, Ghoultown's signature tune "Killer In Texas" was featured in a short film called Headcheese, released on DVD with a movie called Freak. The band was on the road for the first half of 2003, touring the midwest and east coast, in addition to numerous shows in the Texas area. During this time, Ghoultown also recorded songs for two upcoming Jon Keeyes films, Slice of Life and Hallow's End, the latter also featuring a cameo appearance by the band.

In 2004, Ghoultown released a double-disc live set, Live From Texas!, on CD and DVD. In the same year, several of the band's gig posters were included in the Vampire: The Masquerade – Bloodlines PC game.

October 2006 saw the release of the album Bury Them Deep, with a cover painted by illustrator Dan Brereton.

In 2008, Ghoultown released Skeleton Cowboys, a limited edition hand-numbered 7" vinyl single, and Life After Sundown, a full-length studio album (also featuring cover art by Brereton.

A new album, Ghost of the Southern Son, was released on March 15, 2017.

== Band members ==
Current

- Count Lyle – vocals, guitar
- Jake Middlefinger – guitar
- Lizard Lazario – acoustic guitar, backing vocals
- Santi – bass, backing vocals
- Logan Cade – drums

Former

- Queeno DeVamps – bass
- X-Ray Charles – drums
- Dez Black – trumpet
- J. Luis – trumpet
- Dalton Black – drums
- Randy Grimm – trumpet
- Lew Lazario – acoustic guitar (touring only)

== Discography ==
Studio albums

- Tales from the Dead West (2001)
- Give 'Em More Rope (2002)
- Bury Them Deep (2006)
- Life After Sundown (2008)
- Ghost of the Southern Son (2017)
- Curse of Eldorado (2020)

Live albums

- Live from Texas! (2004)

Compilation albums

- The Unforgotten: Rare & Un-Released (2012)
- Best of the Dead West, Vol 1 (2023)

EPs

- Boots of Hell (1999)

Singles

- "Skeleton Cowboys" (2008) (7" vinyl single; hand-numbered, limited to 400)
- "Where Voodoo Sleeps" (2020)

Digibooks

- Mistress of the Dark (2009) (Digibook CD/DVD feat. new Elvira theme song; limited to 2,000)
