= Goodstock Music Festival =

Goodstock Music Festival was a three-day concert arranged by Larry McClurg (of Mind Garage) and Artie Kornfield. It was held on July 19–21, 2007 in Summersville, West Virginia.

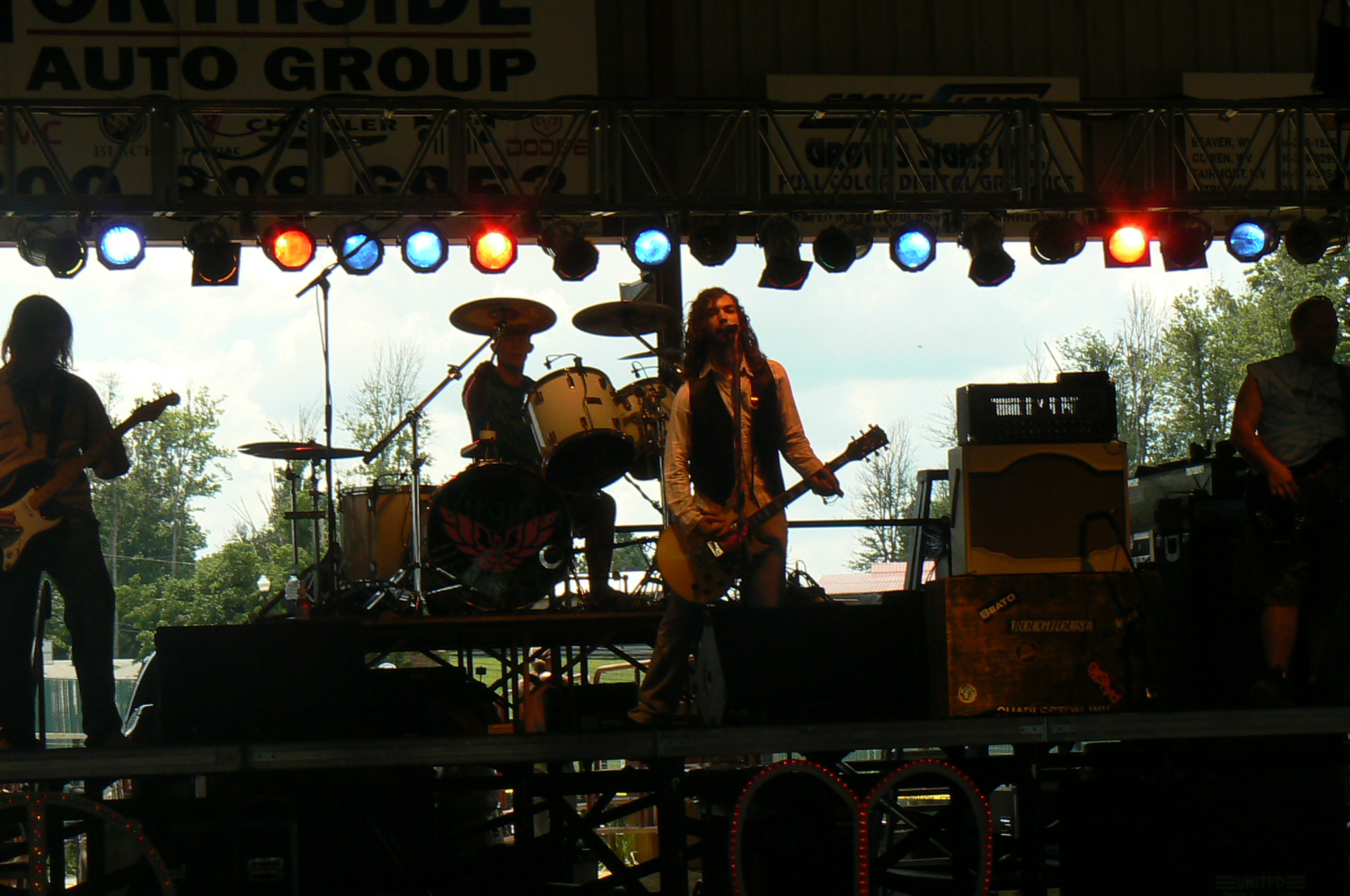
Virginia Street opening the third day of Goodstock 2007

== Concept and promotion ==
The Goodstock Music Festival took place in 2007 as a tribute to the original Woodstock Festival of 1969. Goodstock was founded and supported by Larry McClurg and Artie Kornfeld. McClurg is a veteran of the rock/Christian band Mind Garage. Artie Kornfeld is renowned in the music industry as a songwriter, manager, producer, and an original co-creator of Woodstock '69. On the concept of Goodstock, McClurg said, "This is not an attempt to go back, re-create or re-visit. It is a new 'happening' and an opportunity for the whole family to experience a re-awakening of the ideals of peace and togetherness through music." Kornfeld commented on his own enthusiasm of the musical revival: "Over the years since 1969 there have been attempts to recreate Woodstock. They had the acts and the stage but they did not have the Goodstock 2007 feeling of reliving a moment when all good came together through music as one ... I consider Goodstock to be the first real attempt to have another 3 days of peace and music. I feel magic again."

The original band lineup included headliners such as Jefferson Starship, Quicksilver Messenger Service, Iron Butterfly, Sky Saxon and The Seeds, and Mind Garage. Goodstock was mentioned in Rolling Stone, and its internet promotion attracted audiences from as far away as England. Grass-roots promotional campaigns also sprung up in South America, Asia, and Australia.

== Concert and lineup ==
The music festival was held July 19–21, 2007 at the Good Evening Ranch in Summersville, West Virginia. At the last minute, several of the headlining bands dropped out, leaving only Mind Garage and Sky Saxon and The Seeds to headline. The rest of the music was supplied by local and regional bands.

=== July 19, 2007 ===
- Jesse G
- Cellar Dwellers
- Rik Billock
- Prophet's Thumb
- Guruvs
- Electric Medicine
- Better Butter (aka Hammer)
- Mind Garage

==== July 20, 2007 ====
- Jesse G
- Joe Rich
- Prophet's Thumb
- KJ Roberts
- Ultimatums
- Bushmans Blend (aka Mogel's Brew)
- Angry
- Guruvs
- Jimmy Valentine
- Better Butter (aka Hammer)
- Crystal Mountain
- Skavenger w/ Trannon Lee Goble
- Sean Mullady w/ the Seeds
- Sky Saxon and the Seeds

==== July 21, 2007 ====
- Virginia Street
- Rik Billock
- Mariah Sheperd
- Jordan Hanlon
- Bushmans Blend (aka Mogel's Brew)
- Sean Mullady w/ the Seeds
- Sky Saxon and the Seeds
- Old School Abbey
- Euphonic Brew
- Satchel Page
- House of Commons (aka The Band)
- Duty Bros
- Buddha Chili
- Mind Garage
- Powder Finger (Neil Young Tribute)
- Creedence Country Rockers

== Future of Goodstock ==
Goodstock's official site proclaims the concert a huge success, with "no fighting, drug overdoses, or arrests." There has been no announcement regarding future Goodstocks.
