= Downfall (Solitude Aeturnus album) =

Studio album by Solitude Aeturnus
- Released: May 1996
- Recorded: 1995–1996
- Studio: Regal Studios (Dallas, Texas)
- Genre: Epic doom metal
- Length: 44:07
- Label: Massacre Records
- Producer: Dave Osbourn & Solitude Aeturnus

Solitude Aeturnus chronology
Through the Darkest Hour (1994)	Downfall (1996)	Adagio (1998)

Downfall is the fourth album by American doom metal band Solitude Aeturnus. It was re-released as a double CD together with Through the Darkest Hour.

AllMusic described it as "the most complete album Solitude Aeturnus has made to date, even if purists might prefer the more straight-ahead, earlier Roadrunner material," rating it four stars.

== Track listing ==
No.	Title	Length
1.	"Phantoms"	5:58
2.	"Only This (And Nothing More)"	5:25
3.	"Midnight Dreams"	6:06
4.	"Together and Wither"	5:37
5.	"Elysium"	3:08
6.	"Deathwish" (cover of Christian Death)	2:15
7.	"These Are the Nameless"	5:24
8.	"Chapel of Burning"	4:25
9.	"Concern"	6:16
Total length:		44:34

== Credits ==
- Lyle Steadham – bass
- John Covington – percussion
- John Perez – guitars, tablas on "Elysium", piano on "Chapel of Burning"
- Edgar Rivera – guitars, keyboards on "Phantoms" intro
- Robert Lowe – all vocals, piano on "Phantoms" intro and "Chapel of Burning"

Production

- Produced by Dave Osbourn and Solitude Aeturnus
- Engineered by Dave Osbourn
- Recorded 1995–1996 at Regal Studios, Dallas, Texas
- Digital art by Breck Outland
- Concept by Breck Outland and Count Lyle
