= Mind Garage =

American psychedelic rock band

- Origin: Morgantown, West Virginia, U.S.
- Genres: Psychedelic rock; hard rock; acid rock; Christian rock
- Years active: 1967–1970 (reunions: 1983, 2007, 2008)
- Labels: RCA, Morning Glori Music
- Members: Original and Current Members; Larry McClurg - Norris Lytton; Jack Bond - John Vaughan; Ted Smith
- Past members: Members of Glass Menagerie; John Fisher - Norris Lytton; Tony Senator - Harry Fuller; Tom Warfield - Jim Straub; Larry McClurg - Jack Bond
- Website: www.mindgarage.com

Mind Garage was an American psychedelic rock and roll band from Morgantown, West Virginia, and a progenitor of Christian rock music. Their "Electric Liturgy" performed in 1968 was the first documented Christian rock worship service, and their 1969 eponymous debut RCA album was one of the earliest Christian rock albums released.

== History ==
=== Formation ===
Mind Garage was formed after a five person band from Morgantown, West Virginia called the Glass Menagerie disbanded in July 1967 after touring the Midwest. Those leaving the Glass Menagerie were John Fisher, lead guitarist, who joined the Shadows of Knight as a bass player; and Jim Straub, the drummer. The remaining three members, Larry McClurg, Jack Bond, and Norris Lytton returned to Morgantown where they were all students at West Virginia University. After meeting two other WVU students, John Vaughan and Ted Smith, it was decided to form a new band. The band was encouraged by WVU's campus minister, Episcopal priest Rev. Michael Paine, who helped the group to organize its religious repertory. Paine's wife, Victoria "Tori" Paine, suggested the name Mind Garage to the band.

=== The Electric Liturgy ===
In 1967 Paine suggested the band write rock music with Christian content for use in the church, following the tradition of Bach who used popular tavern songs in his music. "At that time, there were virtually no albums available to a national audience that could remotely be described as Christian rock; it's impossible to overstate how radical the "Electric Liturgy" was in that context. The Mind Garage, which never limited itself to one style of music began composing the Electric Liturgy in Paine's attic with a serious intent to get the message across. The Electric Liturgy was conceived as an orthodox Episcopalian service, but was immediately transformed into an inter-denominational service by the people themselves. It was not uncommon to witness Episcopalians, Catholics, Protestants and Jews together, all taking Communion. People who were out of religion found a meaning in the music.

The live presentation of the Electric Liturgy contains the Kyrie Eleison and The Service of the Word (Greeting, Opening Prayer, First Reading, Psalm, Epistle Reading, Gospel Reading, Sermon, Creed, Pastoral Prayer and the Offertory), immediately followed by the Service of Communion which concludes with a prayer and Benediction and the dismissal of the congregation. The church programs explained that "the Holy Communion is the Creator's act through His people of binding the wounds and healing a broken humanity. Sometimes it is a party, sometimes not. But participation in it signals your desire to take on hope. Therefore all people confessing their frail humanity and yearning for a greater are welcome to come to the altar and receive Holy Communion."

This is the same format used by "Presbyterian, Methodist, and Episcopal service books, historic liturgies from the Catholic Church and the Antiochian Orthodox Christian Church, and ancient liturgies from Egypt, Mesopotamia, and Cappadocia...which all have the same basic structure."

On March 10, 1968, in the first documented Christian rock worship service, the Mind Garage played live in church, "...as cymbals crashed and voices called for love and thanksgiving, babies squealed and happy smiles spontaneously flickered across the congregation". As a result, "those dirty, beatnick-hippies began to have a new image. 'I didn't know they were like THAT,' one woman exclaimed, "That was beautiful!"

The April 14, 1968 Easter Sunday performance originally scheduled on West Virginia University property was cancelled when university administrators backed out of the previous arrangement with Paine and declared the performance unconstitutional. Paine then bargained with the First Presbyterian church to use their parking lot. In the mounting tension the church elders refused to allow the band to use the church facilities when the local paper ran a photo of the Mind Garage in a tree with Paine and friends standing about. At the last moment Rev. Jennings Fast of Wesley Methodist Church provided a place for the service.

The Electric Liturgy became so popular the band was invited to perform the worship service in churches throughout the Eastern United States including Washington, D.C., New York, and Princeton University Chapel. The Electric Liturgy was shocking. Dean Ernest Gordon of Princeton University said, "We could all do with a shocking splendid spiritual surprise."

On July 24, 1968, the term "theo-rock" was coined in the Village Voice in reference to The Mind Garage music. By the end of 1968, the Mind Garage had performed the "Electric Liturgy" live more than a dozen times, in Episcopal, Catholic, Presbyterian, Baptist and Methodist churches, each time with people dancing in the aisles. Each time the services were attended by Christians and non Christians alike in a communal celebration of life. The Mind Garage "literally packed the church". What they did was "...to contemporize religious music. Make it for people today, much as John Wesley or Martin Luther did.

Mind Garage: First nationally televised Christian Rock worship service

A nationally televised Christian Rock and Roll worship service was given by the Mind Garage in St. Mark's Episcopal church in New York on ABC TV, on April 13, 1969.

The Electric Liturgy, recorded for RCA Victor (LSP-4319) in 1969 was the first Christian Rock album ever recorded in Nashville, at RCA's "Nashville Sound" Studio A, on Music Row.

An award-winning article by Joyce Tracewell describes the Electric Mass: "Sun shines through stained glass and colors bounce until the kaleidoscopic vision is suddenly shattered by incredibly swelling music. Smiling musicians with flowery clothes, jeans, long hair, beards and sunglasses play deliberate alien music, the kind that makes you shiver. It fills the room to the ceiling pushing against the walls. They sing in voices that should have belonged to Druids or Incas, or Gypsies under a night sky, and you see Jesus smiling at them. When you leave you feel somebody has been dissecting your soul and everything is clearer. And that's what an Electric Mass is."

One poster associated with the Mind Garage is a line drawing of a bare chested woman with long flowing hair that nearly covers the chest, with her arms raised, surrounded by the group. It was used several times as the cover for service booklets, most notably in St. Mark's Episcopal Church in New York City's Bowery. An adaptation was created for the Electric Liturgy by covering the woman's chest with a banner displaying the words "We Welcome You To The Electric Liturgy, A Festival of Feeling, The Electric Mass".

=== Recording career ===
While still known only locally, the Mind Garage recorded an original single 45 rpm "Asphalt Mother", and drew the attention of major record companies like Chess Records, Atlantic Records and RCA. Marshall Chess came to see the band expecting to hear blues and went away baffled as to the kind of music they played. Atlantic Records only wanted to sign McClurg, but he refused to leave the band. Meanwhile, the Mind Garage continued to play the Electric Mass in church services for free wherever asked, while at the same time shocking and entertaining the audiences in clubs, concert halls and stadiums with their own style of secular, psychedelic rock.

In 1969 the group's newly acquired manager, Tom Surman, aka Cossie, negotiated a contract for the entire band with RCA. The Mind Garage recorded two albums and two singles in New York, Chicago and Nashville studios.

Armed Forces Radio and Television Service entertained troops at home and abroad in Vietnam with the music of the Mind Garage and other artists such as Gary Lewis, Bob Seger, and Percy Faith. The Mind Garage often appeared with groups such as Canned Heat, Sly and the Family Stone, Paul Butterfield, all of whom played at Woodstock 1969.

=== Hiatus ===
The Mind Garage declined the invitation to perform at Woodstock in 1969. In 1970, when their recording contract was about to expire, RCA offered to renew it but the band declined. Without explanation they walked away from a recording career, and simply stopped playing. The band never officially broke up. There was no press release, and no dispute among members, or management. Drummer Ted Smith, acknowledged by Zildjian as one of the best drummers in the world, continued his career with the Spinners as tour drummer for the next several decades, and can be heard on the Spinners "LIVE" album (Atlantic SD 2-910-1198).

=== Reunion ===
Mind Garage at Goodstock Music Festival

In 2007 all five original band members reunited for a music festival. The Father of Woodstock Artie Kornfeld teamed up with Larry McClurg to promote Goodstock Music Festival, reported Pollstar.

According to Kornfeld, "I consider Goodstock to be the first real attempt to have another 3 days of peace and music". "When everybody's doing Woodstocks in 2009, I'm going to be doing Goodstock -The Woodstock Reunion 2009, and that's my dream for Larry and I to have."

== Significance ==
Christian rock music did not exist in 1967 for mainstream American media. As alternative styles of music developed "...Christian Rock Music began in the 1970s when a group known as the Mind Garage recorded "Electric Liturgy". The Mind Garage is perhaps the first Christian Rock band, with documentation going back to 1967 in local media and national magazines and newspapers and television such as The Village Voice, Billboard and Rolling Stone magazine, ABC and NBC TV. "Today original records from many of the original Jesus Rock bands like The Mind Garage (arguably the first band of its kind), Aslan, Selah, The Concrete Rubber Band, and Agape go for hundreds of dollars to collectors...".

For as little time as the Mind Garage performed, their original, unique style and energy had a ripple effect that reached the Punk era and new wave music and beyond. The late 1970s group The Fleshtones refer to the Mind Garage as an influence. Noted folk rock musician John Denver acknowledged each member of the Mind Garage for contributing to his 1982 album, Seasons of the Heart.

== Members ==
- Larry McClurg – lead vocals, background vocals
- John Vaughan – lead guitar
- Ted Smith – drums, background vocals
- Jack Bond – keyboards, background vocals
- Norris Lytton – bass guitar, background vocals, saxophone

== Discography ==
- "Asphalt Mother" / "Reach Out" (Morning Glori Music [45rpm single] 1000, 1968)
- Mind Garage (RCA Victor [LP] LSP-4218, 1969)
- "What's Behind Those Eyes" / "There Was a Time" (RCA Victor [45rpm single] 47-9755, 1969)
- Mind Garage Again! – The Electric Liturgy (RCA Victor [LP] LSP-4319, 1970)
- "Tobacco Road"/ "Jailhouse Rock" (RCA Victor [45rpm single] 47-9812, 1970)
- Mind Garage Early Years [demos] (Morning Glori Music [CD] 2000, 2006)
- Mind Garage / Mind Garage Again! (Caustic Eye Productions [CD] CAUS-017, 2007) reissues/compilation
- A Total Electric Happening (Anazitisi Records [European release only] [LP] ARLP-60-27F, 2009)
- Mind Garage Five (Yellow Sun Music [CD], 2010)

== See also ==
- Contemporary Christian music
- Christian rock
