= Byzantine (band) =

American metal band

- Origin: Charleston, West Virginia, U.S.
- Genres: Groove metal, thrash metal, progressive metal
- Years active: 2000–2008, 2010–present
- Labels: Prosthetic, Metal Blade
- Members: Chris "OJ" Ojeda; Brian Henderson; Ryan Postlethwait; Matt Bowles; Tony Rohrbough
- Past members: Chris "Cid" Adams; Michael "Skip" Cromer; Matt Wolfe; Jeremy Freeman; Sean Sydnor; James Stewart

Byzantine is an American progressive groove/thrash metal band from Charleston, West Virginia, that was formed in 2000. As of June 2025, the band consists of frontman and co-founder Chris "OJ" Ojeda (vocals), Brian Henderson (guitar), Tony Rohrbough (guitar), Matt Bowles (drums), and Ryan Postlethwait (bass). The band has released three studio albums on Prosthetic Records, two independent albums, and two albums on Metal Blade Records. Byzantine is known for its unique sound and modern, "forward thinking" musical style which explores different musical territories and song structures.

The band split on January 26, 2008, one day after the release of their third album, due to various circumstances, but reunited in 2010. In March 2016, Metal Blade Records announced that they had signed the band to a worldwide deal, and the band has since released two albums on the label.

== History ==
Byzantine was formed in the spring of 2000 by bassist Chris "Cid" Adams, lead guitarist Tony Rohrbough, drummer Jeremy Freeman, and vocalist/rhythm guitarist Chris "OJ" Ojeda after their former bands, New Family and Temper, disbanded. Byzantine wrote four songs, then seven more songs were written, and 2000–2001 Demos was recorded and self-released in 2001. Soon after, Byzantine became a part of the local West Virginian heavy metal scene.

Subsequently, the band recruited local musician Matt Wolfe on drums. Ten songs featuring Wolfe were recorded in 2003 at Broadmoor Studios in Huntington, West Virginia and were released as The Broadmoor Demo, gaining the interest of Lamb of God's drummer Chris Adler. Byzantine then had a short East Coast tour with Lamb of God. This tour helped them obtain new fans and a deal with Prosthetic Records.

Soon after, Byzantine released their debut album The Fundamental Component in February 2004, which introduced the band's trademark sound. Subsequently, Byzantine toured with Lamb of God and Shadows Fall, as well as playing the main stage of New England Metal and Hardcore Festival in 2004 and 2006. Chris "Cid" Adams was fired in late 2004, and Byzantine returned to the studio to record their second album in 2005: ...And They Shall Take Up Serpents, with Tony Rohrbough taking over bass duties in the studio. The album received high praise both abroad and domestically.

A 2007 fan-oriented DVD titled Salvation, featuring exclusive material, scenes, in-studio clips, interviews, the uncut version of the "Jeremiad" music video and the performance of the never-before released "Cradle Song", increased the band's popularity. On January 22, 2008, the band's third studio album Oblivion Beckons was released. The band announced its break up one day after the release.

In March 2010, the band reunited and played local shows around West Virginia. The band members insisted that they had returned with the intention of carrying on Byzantine. However, it was announced on August 17, 2010, that original guitarist and founding member Tony Rohrbough was leaving the group. Brian Henderson then returned to fill the role of lead guitarist.

On January 26, 2012, it was announced the band was reunited with original lead guitarist Tony Rohrbough and had plans to record another album, which was to be self-funded. On February 26, 2013, their self-titled album was released. Bassist Michael "Skip" Cromer left the band due to finding religion.

On May 29, 2014, it was announced that Byzantine would be recording their fifth album that September when producer Jay Hannon returned to West Virginia with new guitarist Brian Henderson and new bassist Sean Sydnor. On April 7, 2015, the studio album To Release Is to Resolve was released independently by Byzantine.

In March 2016, the band announced on social media that they had signed a four-record contract with the label Metal Blade Records. The band began recording in late summer 2016 for a spring 2017 release. The band once again worked with Producer Jay Hannon. Byzantine recorded at Byzantine Studios and 7 over 8 Studios. The release date of The Cicada Tree was pushed back from spring to June 2 and ultimately was released on July 28, 2017. Byzantine then set out on their first true North American tour from mid-September to October 2017, in support of thrash metal band Sacred Reich. Byzantine also introduced a new level of crowd interaction as a Tier on their Pledge Music drive. They gave 1 fan the option to buy a tier that allowed them to pick 75% of that night's set list.

On June 13, 2025, Byzantine released their seventh full-length album, Harbingers, also through Metal Blade Records. Four months earlier, on February 15, 2025, the band announced that original guitarist Tony Rohrbough was rejoining, this time alongside Brian Henderson. The album was recorded before Rohrbough's return, but he has been featured in the music video for the album's first single, "Floating Chrysanthema". Since the release of this music video, rhythm guitarist and singer Chris "OJ" Ojeda has shifted to exclusively vocal duties in live settings.

== Musical style, influences and lyrical themes ==
Byzantine plays progressive thrash, which was compared by Decibel Magazine to Testament and Megadeth, with power grooves comparable to Meshuggah or Lamb of God, and occasional clean vocals. The band's former record label, Prosthetic Records, also compared them to Pantera. Byzantine plays technical and retro-minded Bay Area thrash. Their music has been described as simultaneously melodic and aggressive. Byzantine also occasionally incorporates instrumental sections in their songs and spoken word vocals. The guitar solos range from shredding to progressive to jazz. The band also uses acoustic guitar and tribal-esque drum beats. Byzantine plays modern metal, exploring different musical territories and song structures, and has been labeled as a "forward-thinking" band. Growing up in West Virginia has helped Byzantine develop a unique sound. "We are quite alienated from any big scene", explains Ojeda. "Therefore, we tend to think for ourselves a lot more when writing material."

The Gauntlet states "The Fundamental Component is characterized by long songs, melodic thrash and Tony Rohrbough's scathing guitar solos while still embracing technical chaos and the violent groove of bassist Chris Adams and drummer Matt Wolfe." Byzantine singer/guitarist Chris Ojeda says "I think we have a knack for achieving a good balance of chaos and melody". Liz Ciavarella from Metal Maniacs magazine uses descriptions such as "Scrupulous time-shifts and strategically-placed off-beats; forever infectious grooves, breakdowns (thrashdowns?) and ceaseless experimentation that end in intricate catchy Metal mantras" to explain Byzantine's style.

Byzantine frontman Chris Ojeda, who plays guitar while singing, is considered to be in the tradition of James Hetfield, Dave Mustaine, Max Cavalera, Mikael Akerfeldt, and Chuck Schuldiner.

Lyrically the band is influenced by such bands as Meshuggah, Carcass and Opeth and focuses on problems indigenous to their home, such as religion in American society.

== Band members ==
=== Current members ===
- Chris "OJ" Ojeda – lead vocals (2000–present), rhythm guitar (2000–2025)
- Brian Henderson – lead guitar (2010, 2013–present), backing vocals (2013–present)
- Matt Bowles – drums (2016–present)
- Ryan Postlethwait – bass, backing vocals (2018–present)
- Tony Rohrbough – lead guitar (2000–2013), rhythm guitar (2025–present)

=== Former members ===
- Jeremy Freeman – drums (2000–2002)
- Matt Wolfe – drums (2002–2015) (died 2021)
- Chris "Cid" Adams – bass (2000–2004)
- Michael "Skip" Cromer – bass (2004–2013)
- Sean Sydnor – bass (2013–2018)

== Discography ==
=== Studio albums ===
- The Fundamental Component – (2004, Prosthetic Records)
- ...And They Shall Take Up Serpents – (2005, Prosthetic Records)
- Oblivion Beckons – (2008, Prosthetic Records)
- Byzantine – (2013, self-released)
- To Release Is to Resolve – (2015, self-released)
- The Cicada Tree – (2017, Metal Blade Records)
- Harbingers - (2025, Metal Blade Records)

=== Extended plays ===
- Black Sea Codex – (2022, WV Snakepit)

=== Demos ===
- 2000–2001 Demos – (2001, Caustic Eye Productions)
- Broadmoor – (2003, full-length demo, also known as European Sampler, DK Entertainment/KMS)

=== Other ===
The band was featured on two tribute albums in which they recorded an exclusive cover song for each.

- On Your Knees: The Tribute to Judas Priest – (2007, Crimson Mask Records)
- For the Sick, a Tribute to Eyehategod – (2007, Emetic Records)
- The Broadmoor Demo – (2009, originally as a bootleg recording of The Fundamental Component by Crash Music Inc., later officially released)

== Videography ==
- Jeremiad: A Video by Donnie Searls – (2006, Mini-DVD, Atma)
- Salvation – (2007, DVD, Prosthetic Records)
- "Soul Eraser" – (2013)
- The Agonies – (2015, Screaming Butterfly Entertainment, directed by Holly Siders, MA, MFA)
- You Sleep, We Wake (Lyric Video) – (2015, Screaming Butterfly Entertainment, directed and animated by Holly Siders, MA, MFA)
- Justinian Code – (2016, Screaming Butterfly Entertainment, directed by Holly Siders, MA, MFA)
- New Ways to Bear Witness – (2017, Screaming Butterfly Entertainment)
- Floating Chrysanthema (Official Video) – (2025, Metal Blade Records)
