= The Fundamental Component =

Studio album by Byzantine
- Released: February 10, 2004
- Recorded: 2003
- Genre: Groove metal
- Length: 52:00
- Label: Prosthetic
- Producer: Aaron Fisher and Byzantine

Byzantine chronology
Broadmoor (2003)	The Fundamental Component (2004)	…And They Shall Take Up Serpents (2005)

Professional ratings
Review scores
Source	Rating
AllMusic	3.5/5 stars
Lambgoat	8/10 stars

The Fundamental Component is the debut studio album American heavy metal band Byzantine. It was released on February 10, 2004.

== Track listing ==
No.	Title	Length
1.	"Hatfield"	5:51
2.	"Stick Figure"	4:49
3.	"Stoning Judas"	4:38
4.	"My New Casket"	6:16
5.	"Sin Remover"	5:47
6.	"Slipping On Noise"	4:54
7.	"Kill Chain"	5:19
8.	"The Devil's Arithmetic"	4:30
9.	"Brundlefly"	4:38
10.	"The Filth of Our Underlings"	5:43

== Critical reception ==
Reception for the Fundamental Component ranged from slightly to generally positive.

AllMusic felt that the albums' best songs were "unveiling truly progressive and exploratory melodic passages", but that the remainder was hindered by excessive tinkering and split style between metal subgenres.

Disagreeing with these negatives, Lambgoat appreciated the split musical influences, praising both the groove and "hard violence" of the guitars. The variety of vocals also received praise, especially of the control demonstrated when varying between different styles. The review summarised that "any fan of heavy metal should love this album, because there is something for everyone".

Exclaim! also appreciated the instrumental variety, but scorned the quality of OJ's singing as "atrociously meager", with a combined effect that though the album was interesting, several pieces became unbearable.

== Personnel ==
- Chris "OJ" Ojeda – vocals, rhythm guitar
- Tony Rohbrough – lead and rhythm guitar
- Chris "Cid" Adams – bass
- Matt Wolfe – drums
- Josh Galeos – mixing
- Aaron Fisher – producer/engineer
