= Solitude Aeturnus =

American epic doom metal band

- Also known as: Solitude
- Origin: Arlington, Texas, U.S.
- Genres: Epic doom metal
- Years active: 1987–2011, 2023–present
- Labels: Roadrunner, Massacre
- Members: John Perez; Lyle Steadham; Logan Cade; Edgar Rivera
- Past members: Kristoff Gabehart; Tom Martinez; Brad Kane; Chris Hardin; Robert Lowe; James Martin; Steve Nichols; Teri Pritchard; Kurt Joye; Steve Moseley; John Covington

Solitude Aeturnus is an American epic doom metal band from Arlington, Texas. Founded by guitarist John Perez in 1987, the band has released six studio albums. Their original name Solitude (later changed to Solitude Aeturnus) was chosen to pay homage to Black Sabbath and Candlemass, both of whom had songs bearing the name "Solitude".

The band's vocalist, Robert Lowe, was also the singer for the doom metal band Candlemass between 2007 and 2012. Bassist Lyle Steadham and drummer Logan Cade are the lead vocalist/guitarist and drummer for the band Ghoultown.

== History ==
Formed in early 1987, the lineup began as John Perez quit his former thrash metal band Rotting Corpse in early 1987. Already a veteran in the metal scene, Perez had begun to tire of the limitations of thrash and sought a new sound. Already a longtime follower of the early 1980s classic doom groups like Witchfinder General, St. Vitus, Black Hole, Nemesis and the like, Perez decided to adopt a doom metal sound. He assembled a group of musicians over the next year, namely Brad Kane (drums; another member of the early 1980s thrash scene), Kris Gabehardt (vocals; previously with Satanic death metal band Death Tripper), Tom Martinez (guitar), and Chris Hardin (bass). After writing songs and rehearsing up until December 1987, the band entered the studio in January 1988 to record a five-song demo entitled And Justice for All... This title and demo preceded the Metallica's album of the same name by some seven months. The band's name at this time was Solitude; it was two years later that the band were forced to change the name to Solitude Aeturnus.

After the release of the demo, various gigs around the local area followed. In late 1988, changes started to occur within the band, finally settling on a lineup that consisted of Perez on guitars alongside Robert Lowe (vocals), Edgar Rivera (guitar), Lyle Steadham (bass), and John "Wolf" Covington (drums). This lineup lasted for the next seven years until 1996 and recorded the second official demo of the band containing two tracks, "Mirror of Sorrow" and "Opaque Divinity". (Steadham had originally joined the band on drums while Chris Hardin was still on bass; Steadham then moved over to bass duties as Hardin left the band and Covington joined.)

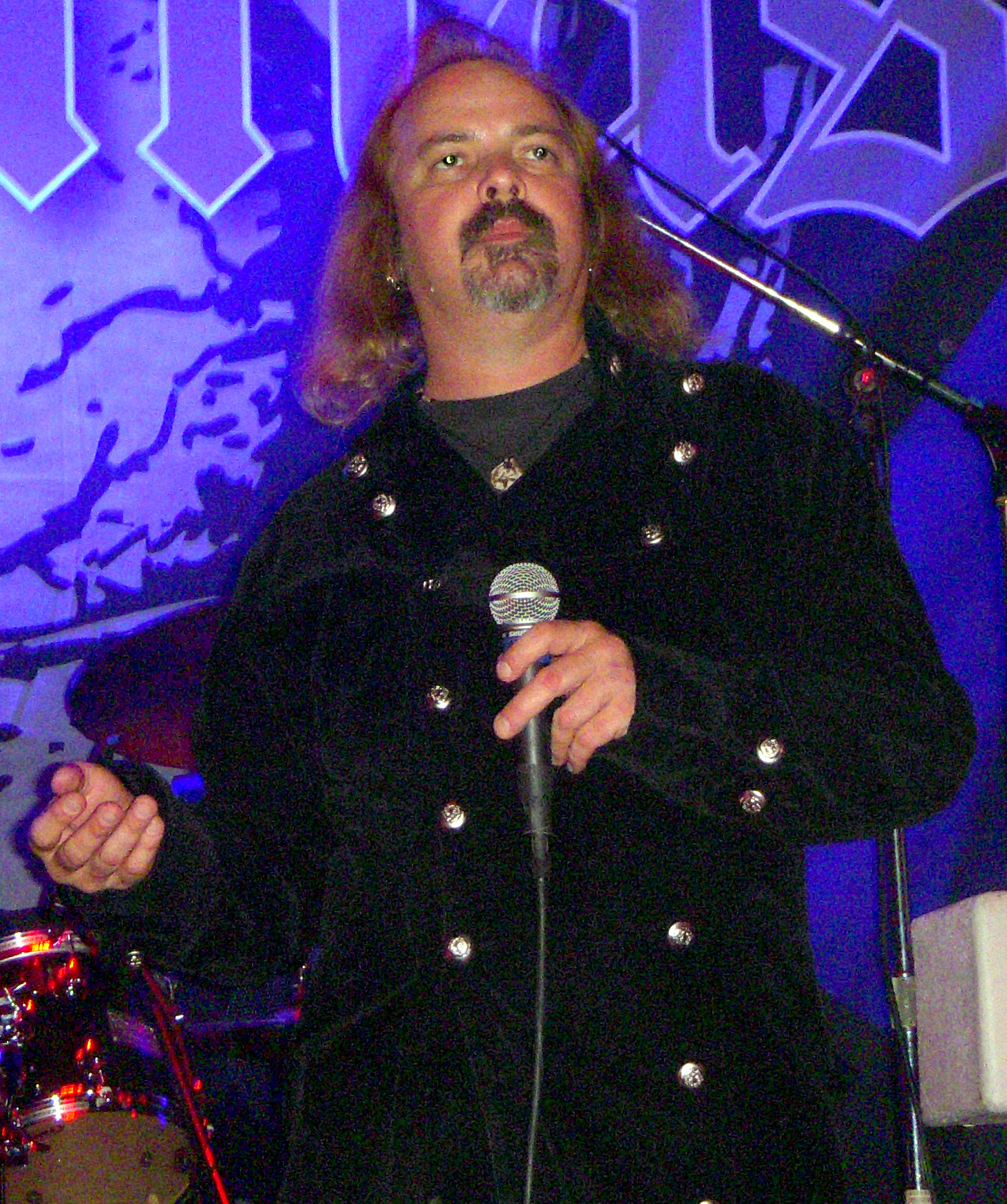
Vocalist Robert Lowe joined the band in 1988.

The two-song demo tape caught the attention of the independent label King Klassic. The band entered the Dallas Sound Lab in January 1990 to record their debut album, Into the Depths of Sorrow. The whole album was recorded for a sum of $3,000 and done in seven days including the remix. Shortly after the album was delivered, it suffered a delay due to King Klassic not having the money to put it out. After some shopping around, the album eventually caught the attention of Roadrunner Records, which led to Solitude Aeturnus signing with the label. After numerous other delays, the album finally saw the light of day in July 1991, a full year-and-a-half after the album was recorded. No tours followed, although by this time the band had already written enough songs for a second album.

In March 1992, the band entered Sound Logic recording studios to begin the sessions for the second album, Beyond the Crimson Horizon. The budget for this album was much greater and as a result the sound was improved. The album was released in July 1992 and eventually a U.S. tour was set up in late November with Paul Di'Anno's band Killers. It lasted six weeks and was a success for the band. Shortly after, in February 1993, the band were dropped from Roadrunner. In December, they signed a new recording contract with up-and-coming label Pavement Records.

The band decided to get away from their familiar surroundings and took off for England to record their third album, Through the Darkest Hour. Recorded in late March 1994 at Rhythm Studios, it showed a simpler and heavier direction. Through the Darkest Hour received positive reviews upon its release in August 1994. After a few months of negotiating, the band went on the road with Mercyful Fate for an extensive U.S. tour. The tour lasted six weeks, and shortly after, the band embarked on their first tour of Europe with fellow doom band Revelation. After the tour, the band went through a long break that would last until April 1996 when recording for the next album commenced. During this time, Perez started his own label Brainticket Records as well as recording a solo album under the name of The Liquid Sound Company.

The next album, Downfall, was recorded in Dallas, Texas. Although it received favorable reviews, the band expressed dissatisfaction with the final product, citing issues with the production quality. They eventually underwent their first (and only) major lineup change. Lyle Steadham left the band shortly after the recording of Downfall, primarily because he was tired of the group's sound, and eventually formed the punk band The Killcreeps. Solitude Aeturnus continued on enlisting the services of Teri Pritchard in as temporary bassist. It was this lineup that toured Europe in April 1996 with Swedish power metal band Morgana Lefay. Another unintentional break followed and a split from Pavement Records eventually occurred. During this time, new bass player Steve Moseley, a longtime friend and fan of the band, replaced Steadham.

Solitude Aeturnus signed with German label Massacre Records in December 1997 and recorded their fifth studio album, Adagio. This time going back to Rhythm Studios in England, the album was recorded in March 1998 and released in June of the same year. The band toured Europe in September 1998 with Saviour Machine in support of the record. Adagio finally saw a U.S. release in January 1999 through Olympic Records. Being distributed through Polygram, the Olympic deal gave the band greater exposure in the native country.

The band went on hiatus in 2011, but reunited in 2023 when they announced they would be playing at the Hell's Heroes festival in March 2024, which was headlined by Sodom and Queensrÿche.

On April 28, 2026, it was announced the band had parted ways with Robert Lowe, and had recruited long time Watchtower/Dangerous Toys vocalist Jason McMaster for a festival appearance at the 2026 Maryland DeathFest.

== Members ==
Current members

- John Perez – guitars (1987–2011, 2023–present)
- Edgar Rivera – guitars (1988–1998, 2023–present)
- Lyle Steadham – bass (1990–1996, 2023–present), drums (1988–1989)
- Logan Cade – drums (2025–present)
- James-Paul Luna - vocals (2026-present)

Former members

- Kris Gabehart – vocals (1987–1988)
- Tom Martinez – guitar (1987–1988)
- Brad Kane – drums (1987–1988)
- Chris Hardin – bass (1987–1989)
- Robert Lowe – vocals (1988–2011, 2023–2026)
- Teri Pritchard – bass (1997)
- Steve Moseley – bass (1998–2004), guitars (2004–2011, 2023–2024)
- Kurt Joye – bass (2004–2005)
- James Martin – bass (2005–2011)
- Steve Nichols – drums (2005–2011)
- John Covington – drums (1990–2005, 2023–2025)

Timeline

== Discography ==
=== Studio albums ===
- Into the Depths of Sorrow (1991) (reissued and expanded by Massacre Records in November 2006)
- Beyond the Crimson Horizon (1992) (reissued and expanded by Massacre Records in November 2006)
- Through the Darkest Hour (1994)
- Downfall (1996)
- Adagio (1998)
- Alone (2006)

=== Other releases ===
- And Justice for All... (demo, 1988)
- Demo 89 (1989)
- Days of Doom (1994) (VHS tape featuring rare and unreleased performances and studio footage of the recording of their first three albums)
- Hour of Despair (DVD, 2007)
- In Times of Solitude (compilation, 2011)
