= ...And They Shall Take Up Serpents =

Studio album by Byzantine
- Released: July 12, 2005
- Genre: Groove metal
- Length: 48:20
- Label: Prosthetic
- Producer: Aaron Fisher and Byzantine

Byzantine chronology
The Fundamental Component (2004)	...And They Shall Take Up Serpents (2005)	Oblivion Beckons (2008)

Professional ratings
Review scores
Source	Rating
AllMusic	4/5 stars
Blabbermouth.net	(8/10)
Decibel	

...And They Shall Take Up Serpents is the second studio album by American heavy metal band Byzantine. It was released on July 12, 2005.

== Track listing ==
No.	Title	Length
1.	"Justicia"	4:07
2.	"Taking Up Serpents"	3:12
3.	"Jeremiad"	6:00
4.	"Ancestry of the Antichrist"	5:54
5.	"Temporary Temples"	4:59
6.	"Five Faces of Madness"	5:29
7.	"Red Neck War"	5:39
8.	"Pity None"	3:58
9.	"The Rat Eaters"	4:31
10.	"Salem, Ark"	4:31

== Personnel ==
- Chris "OJ" Ojeda – vocals, guitars, piano
- Tony Rohbrough – guitars, bass
- Matt Wolfe – drums, acoustic guitar
- Drew Mazurek – mixing
- Aaron Fisher – production

== Singles ==
- "Jeremiad"
