= Mothman Festival =

Festival around the cryptid Mothman in Point Pleasant, West Virginia, USA

- Status: Active
- Genre: Mothman
- Date: Third week of September
- Frequency: Annually
- Locations: Point Pleasant, West Virginia
- Coordinates: 38°50′38″N 82°8′15″W
- Country: US
- Years active: 23–24
- Attendance: 15,000 (2023)
- Organizer: Jeff Wamsley
- Website: Official website

The Mothman Festival is a yearly festival, held in Point Pleasant, West Virginia, around the West Virginia Cryptid, Mothman.

== History ==
The inaugural Mothman Festival, organized by Jeff Wamsley, took place in 2002. Since then it has become a big source of tourism for Point Pleasant, alongside the Mothman Museum.

The Mothman Festival began after brainstorming creative ways to attract visitors to Point Pleasant. The group organizing the event chose the Mothman to be the center of the festival due to its uniqueness, and as a way to celebrate its local legacy in the town.

2020 saw the festival's hiatus until next year.

In 2023, the festival hosted over 15,000 guests.

== Popular culture ==
- The film Mothman follows a reporter covering the 10th Mothman Festival

== See also ==
- List of festivals in West Virginia
