= Palace Theatre (Canton, Ohio) =

- Palace Theater
- U.S. National Register of Historic Places
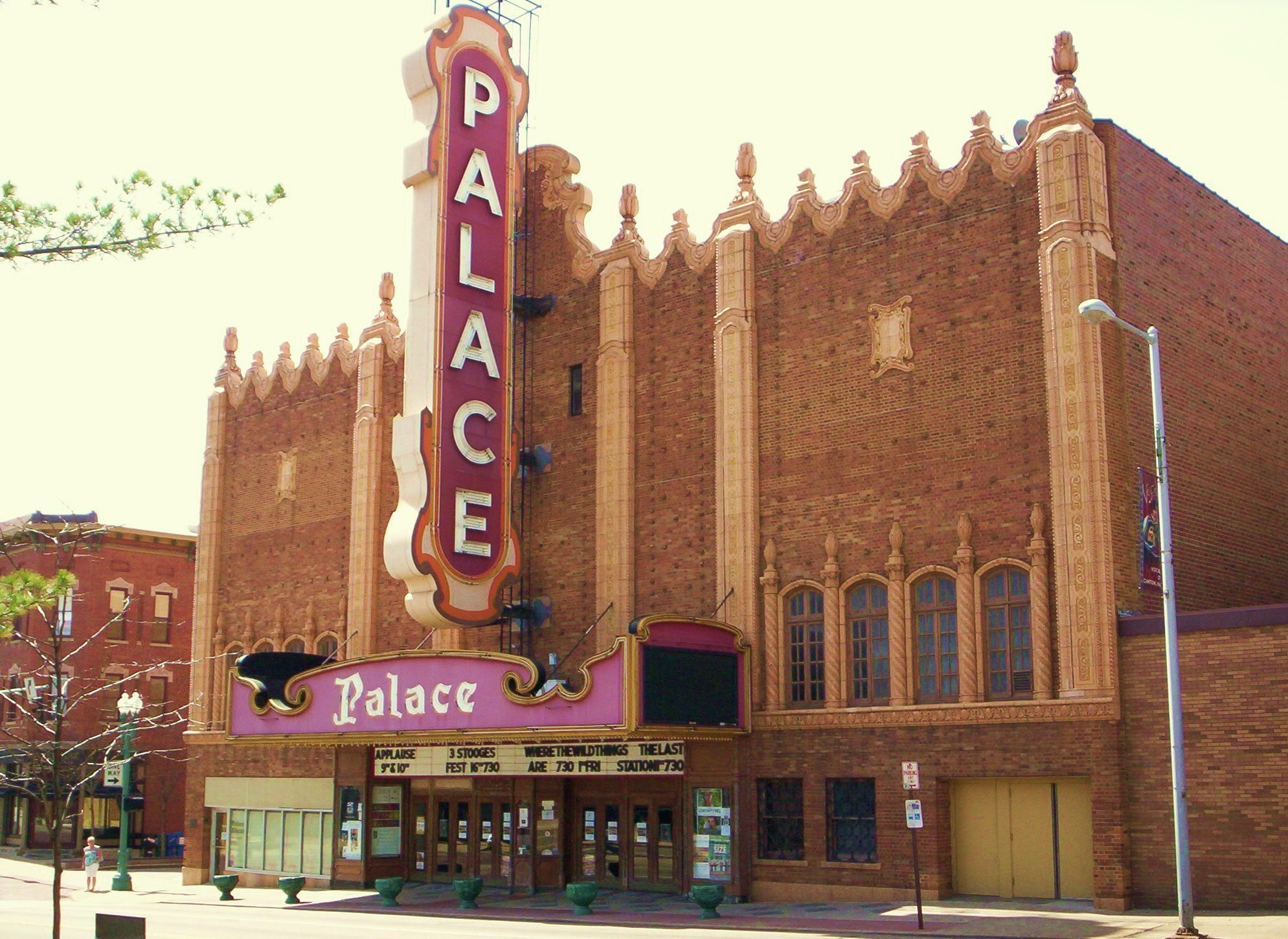
- Front Facade, facing Market Ave.

- Location within Ohio Location within the United States
- Location: 605 Market Ave., N., Canton, Ohio
- Coordinates: 40°48′8″N 81°22′25″W
- Area: Less than 1 acre (0.40 ha)
- Built: 1926
- Architect: John Eberson
- NRHP reference No.: 79001949
- Added to NRHP: April 26, 1979

The Palace Theater is a historic movie palace in downtown Canton, Ohio, United States. Constructed during the heyday of the movie palace in the 1920s, it has been named a historic site. The 21' x 46' screen is the largest in Canton as of 2019. It contains a Kilgen theater organ which is still playing to this day, thanks to an eight month restoration effort in 1992. Only a few dozen such organs are still operational at their original sites.

== History ==
Designed by John Eberson, a prominent architect specializing in movie palaces, the Palace is an atmospheric theater that opened in November 1926. Money for its construction was donated by a Canton industrialist, Harry Ink, whose firm became prosperous by producing "Tonseline", a medication for sore throats; the Tonseline logo was a giraffe with a bandaged throat, and such a giraffe was included in the interior design. In its early years, the Palace hosted a wide range of events: besides ordinary films, it hosted vaudeville performances and other stage productions, and numerous community events at the Palace placed it at the center of Canton society.

Built of brick with elements of terracotta, the Palace is a rectangular Churrigueresque building with a garden-themed main auditorium; its ceiling features elements designed to convey the sense of night and dawn, together with numerous stars, and the auditorium has a capacity of 1,509. The facade is divided into sections of varying width, two on each side of a vertical sign rising above the rest of the building; all sections rise to numerous pinnacles. A central marquee shelters the zone under the vertical sign and beneath the two sections adjacent to the sign. Windows are placed near the base of the two sections on the sides of the facade.

== Historic status ==
The Palace was listed on the National Register of Historic Places in 1979, qualifying both because of its architecture and because of its place in community history. Its historic status has been employed during events such as a 2012 fundraiser, during which its operators sought to raise more than $1 million to fund improvements to its utilities and its facade.

== Present day ==
The theater's Kilgen Wonder Organ is used to accompany silent films. The Mansfield, Ohio paper Richland Source described volunteer organist Jay Spencer as "well known in Canton" for his skillful silent film performances. Another paper called the organ "a showpiece all by itself".

Besides ordinary theater events, the Palace has hosted ghost hunters seeking the spirit of a young woman who was murdered in the theater in the 1930s.

Due to the COVID-19 pandemic, at least 56 events were canceled in 2020. Some silent films were streamed online to over 14,000 people. The films were screened in an empty theater outside of the technical director and organist.

The theater makes use of 228 volunteers for over 4,000 volunteer hours.
