= Lyle Blackburn =

American musician

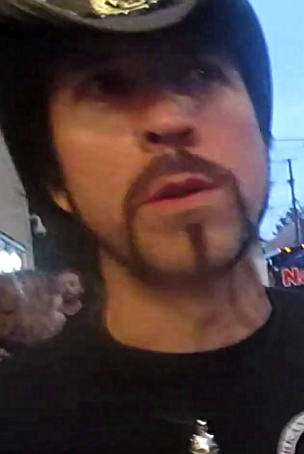
- Blackburn in 2018
- Born: Robert Lyle Steadham; October 23, 1966 (age 59); Fort Worth, Texas, U.S.
- Other name: Count Lyle
- Occupations: Musician, author, filmmaker
- Years active: 1988–present
- Musical career
- Genres: Rock, heavy metal, doom metal
- Instruments: Vocals, guitar, bass
- Member of: Ghoultown
- Formerly of: Solitude Aeturnus
- Website: lyleblackburn.com

Lyle Blackburn (born Robert Lyle Steadham; October 23, 1966) is an American musician and author. He is the vocalist and guitarist of the rock band Ghoultown and was formerly the bassist of the epic doom metal band Solitude Aeturnus.

Blackburn has authored four books and either narrated or produced several documentary films related to cryptids, and has been a speaker at multiple cryptozoology and Bigfoot-related conventions.

== Biography ==
Blackburn authored The Beast of Boggy Creek: The True Story of the Fouke Monster, a 2012 book about the Fouke Monster, and is a writer for Rue Morgue magazine. He has narrated three documentary films: The Mothman of Point Pleasant (2017; also executive producer and co-writer), The Bray Road Beast (2018), and Terror in the Skies (2019). He also co-produced the 2016 film Boggy Creek Monster.

As a musician, Blackburn started with the epic doom metal group Solitude Aeturnus and played with them from 1988 to 1995, first as the drummer and then as the bassist. He left to found The Killcreeps in 1996 and later Ghoultown in 1999, for which he is the lead singer/guitarist and performs under the name Count Lyle.

He has a sister.

== Discography ==
=== With Solitude Aeturnus ===
- Demo 1989 (demo) (1989), drums
- Into the Depths of Sorrow (1991), bass
- Beyond the Crimson Horizon (1992), bass
- Promo (demo) (1993), vocals (additional), bass
- Through the Darkest Hour (1994), bass
- Days of Doom (video/VHS) (1994), bass
- The New Wave of American True Meta (split) (Solitude Aeturnus and Iron Rainbow album) (1996), bass
- Downfall (1996), bass

=== The Killcreeps ===
- Destroy Earth (1997)

=== Ghoultown ===
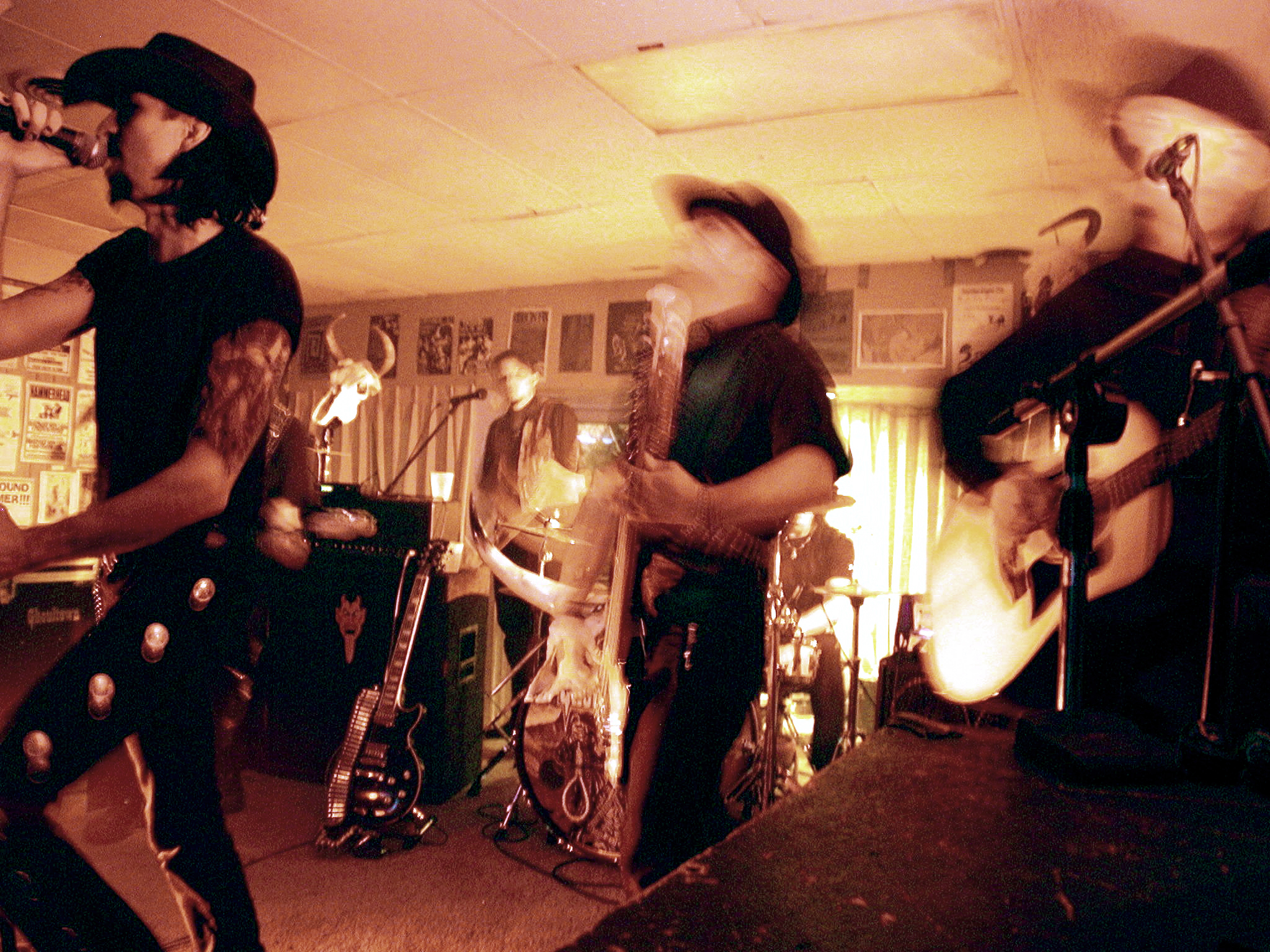
Blackburn (left) performing with Ghoultown in 2005

- Boots of Hell (1999)
- Tales from the Dead West (2000)
- Give 'Em More Rope (2002)
- Live from Texas! (2004)
- Bury Them Deep (2006)
- Life After Sundown (2008)
- Skeleton Cowboys (2008)
- Mistress of the Dark (2009)
- The Unforgotten: Rare & Un-Released (2012)
- Ghost of the Southern Son (2017)
- Curse of Eldorado (2020)

== Filmography ==
=== Film ===
Soundtrack/Music
Year	Title	Notes	Ref(s)
2002	American Nightmare	Direct-to-video film; wrote "After 2", "Boots of Hell", "Humanoids from the Deep", "Killer in Texas", and "10 Seconds to Blood"	
2003	Hallow's End	Direct-to-video film; wrote "Bury the Hatchet"	
2004	Suburban Nightmare	Direct-to-video film; wrote "Killin's a Bitch"	
2012	Butcher Boys	Wrote "Under the Phantom Moon"	

Actor/narrator
Year	Title	Role	Notes	Ref(s)
2002	American Nightmare	Ghoultown (as Count Lyle)	Direct-to-video film	
2006	Return of the Jackalope	Ghoultown (as Count Lyle)		
2013	Skookum: The Hunt for Bigfoot	—N/a	Special thanks (post-production)	
2016	Boggy Creek Monster	Himself	Also co-producer	
2017	The Mothman of Point Pleasant	Narrator	Also executive producer and co-writer	
2018	The Bray Road Beast	Narrator		
2019	Terror in the Skies	Narrator		

=== Television ===
Year	Title	Role	Notes	Ref(s)
2013	Monsters and Mysteries in America	Himself	Episode: Ozarks	

== Bibliography ==
- The Beast of Boggy Creek: The True Story of the Fouke Monster (Anomalist Books, March 1, 2012)
- Lizard Man: The True Story of the Bishopville Monster (Anomalist Books, October 31, 2013)
- Beyond Boggy Creek: In Search of the Southern Sasquatch (Anomalist Books, February 1, 2017)
- Momo: The Strange Case of the Missouri Monster (Anomalist Books, February 26, 2019)
