= List of Therion members =

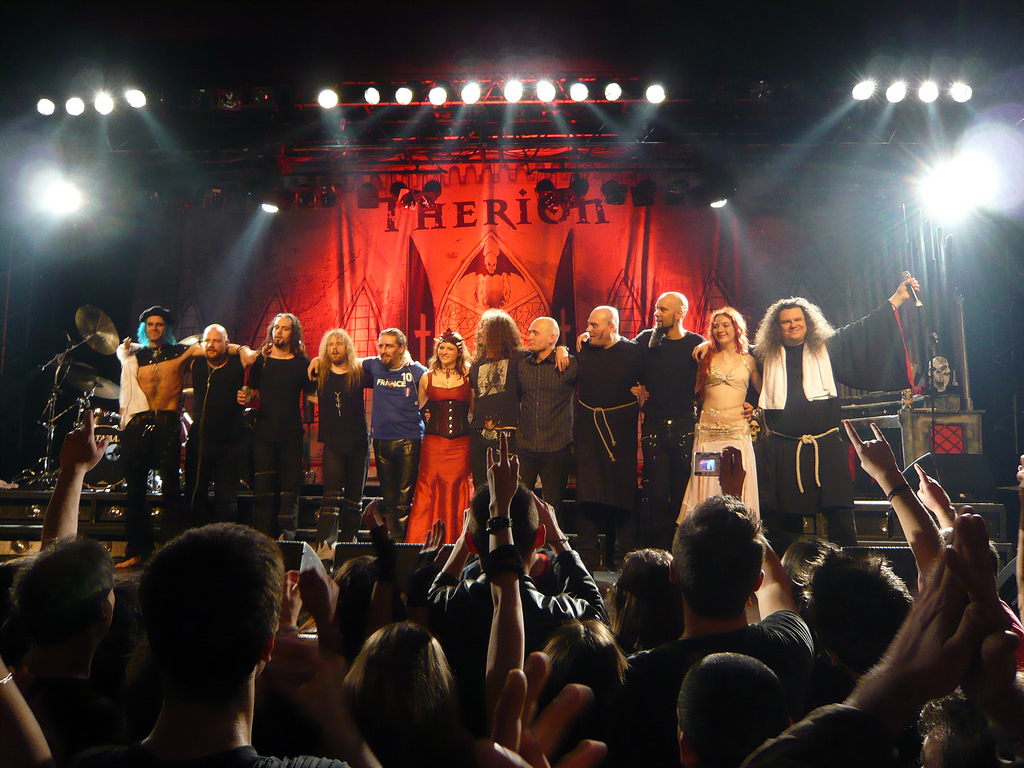
Live show in Paris, 2007. From left to right: Snowy Shaw, Petter Karlsson, Johan Niemann, Christofer Johnsson, Thomas Vikström, Lori Lewis, Mats Levén, Piotr Wawrzeniuk, Ferdy Doernberg, Kristian Niemann, Arien (belly dancer), Messiah Marcolin.

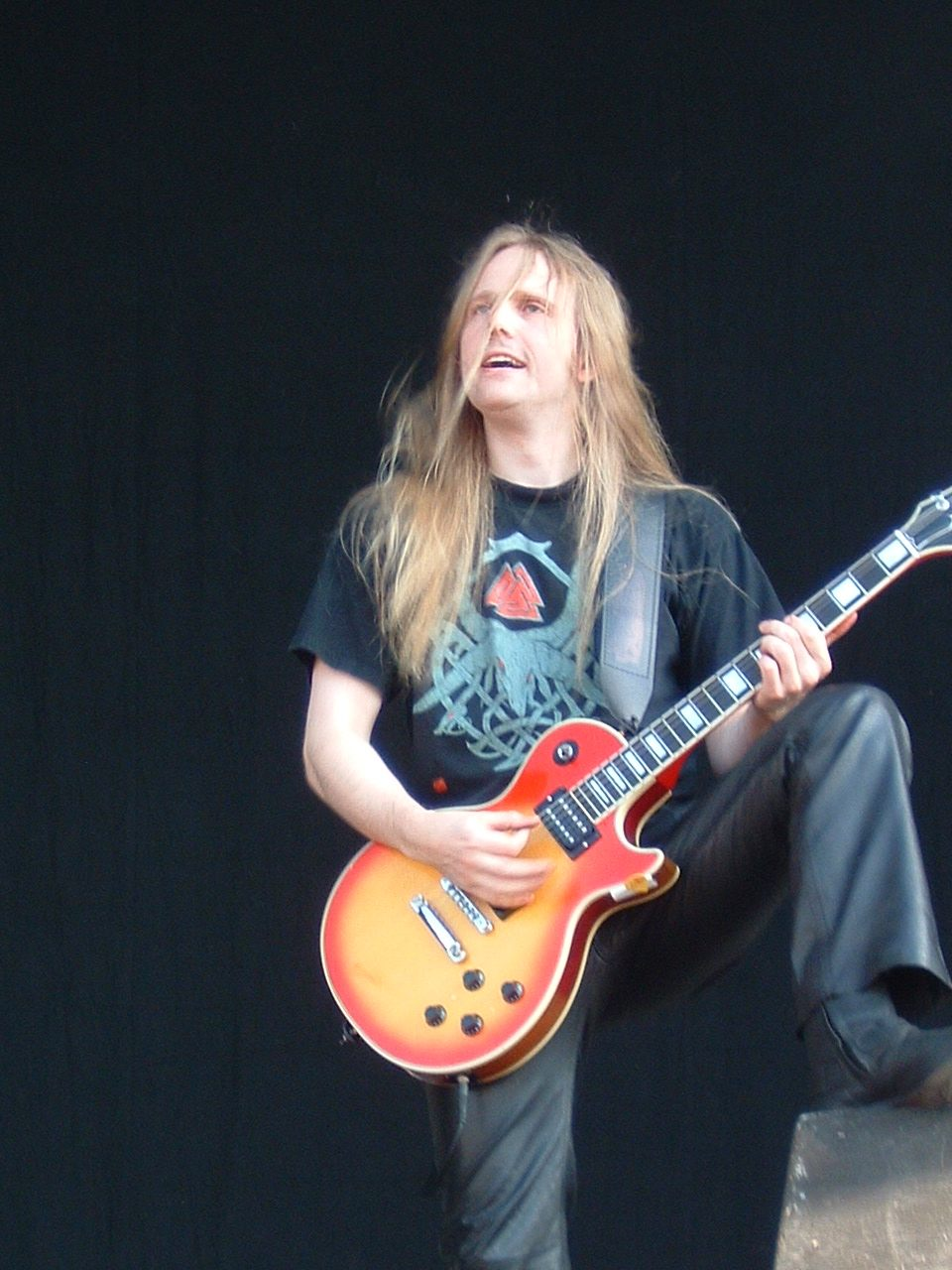
Christofer Johnsson

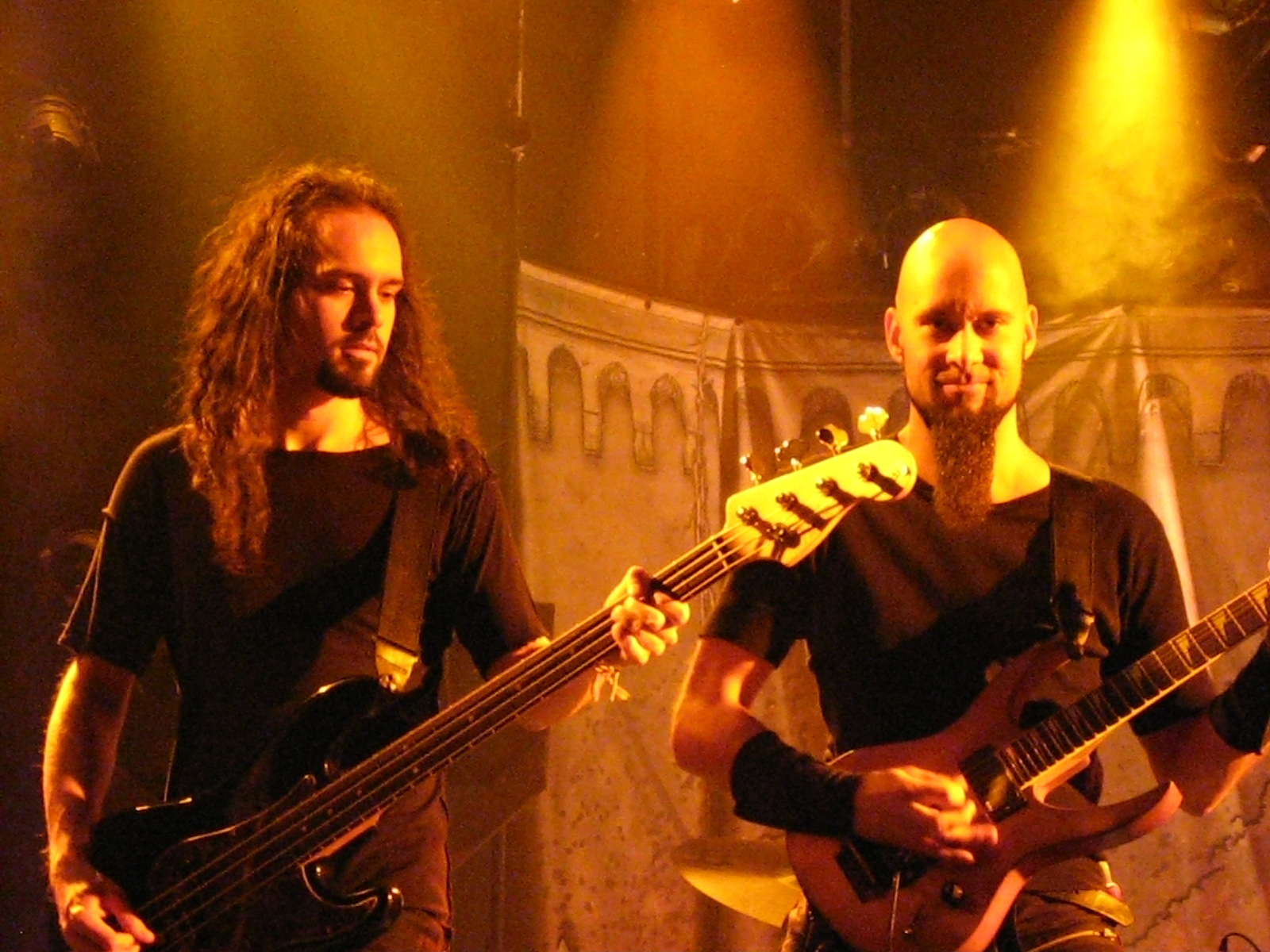
Niemann brothers: Johan (left) and Kristian (right)

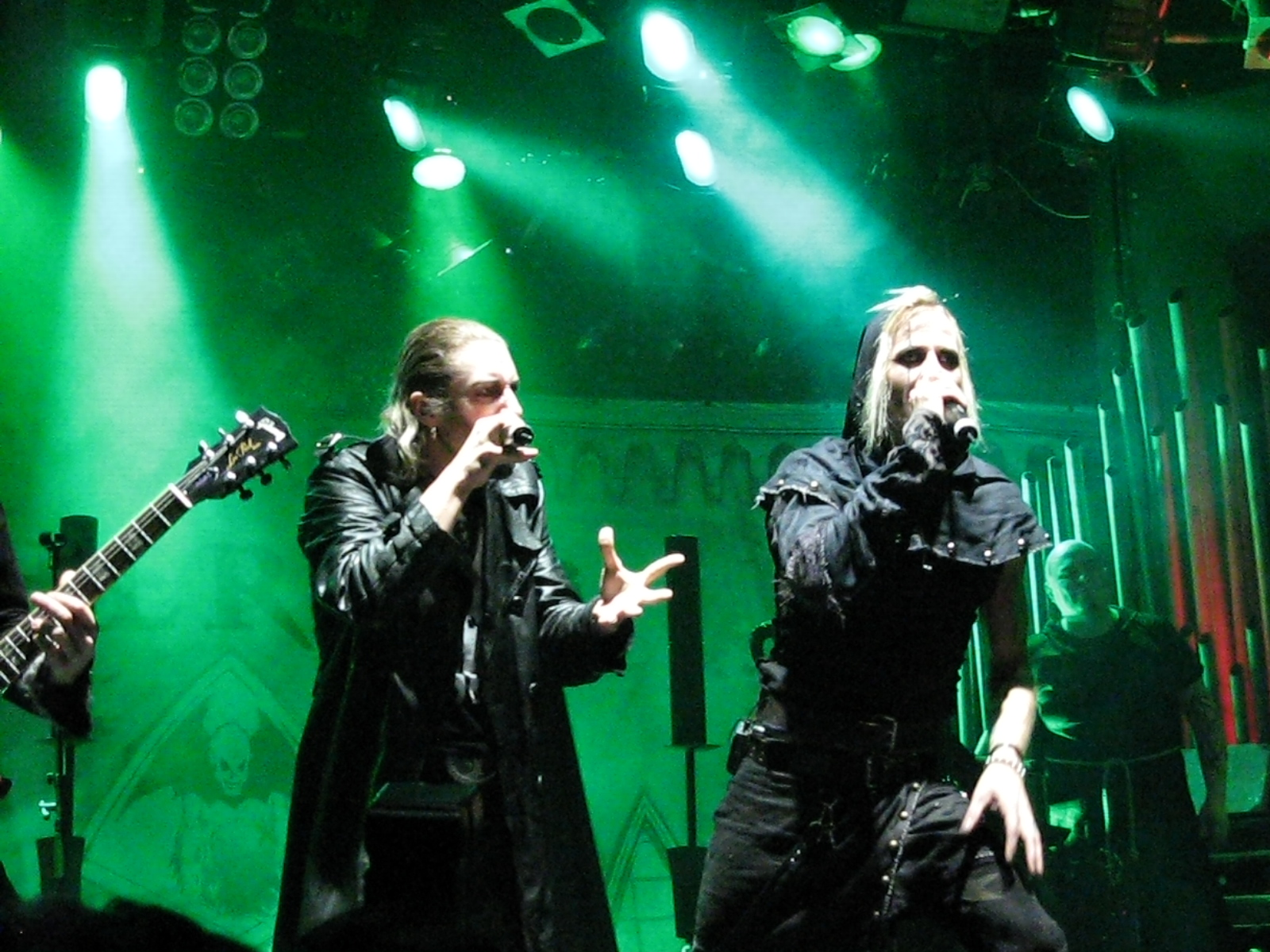
Thomas Vikström (left) and Snowy Shaw (right)

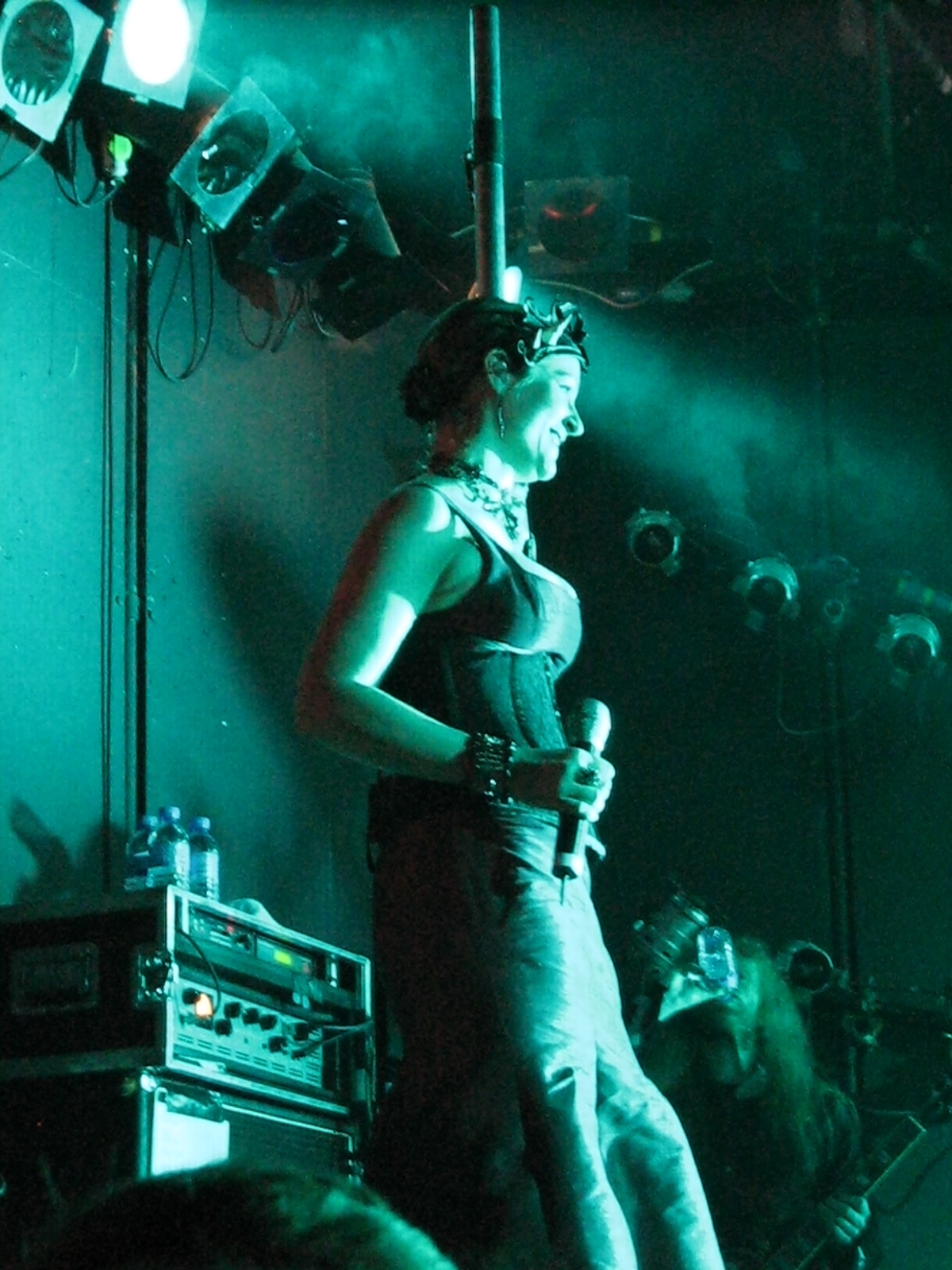
Lori Lewis

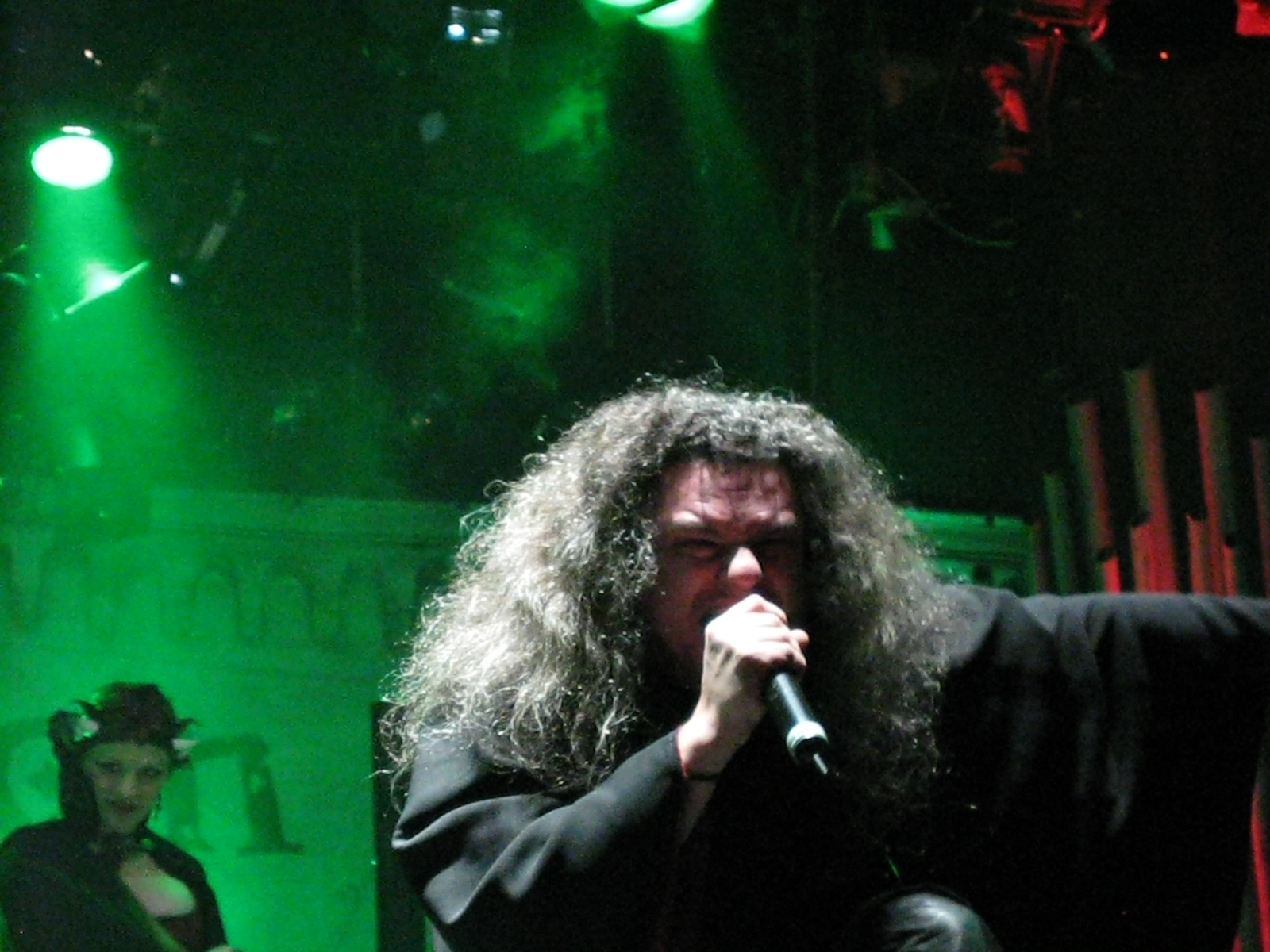
Messiah Marcolin

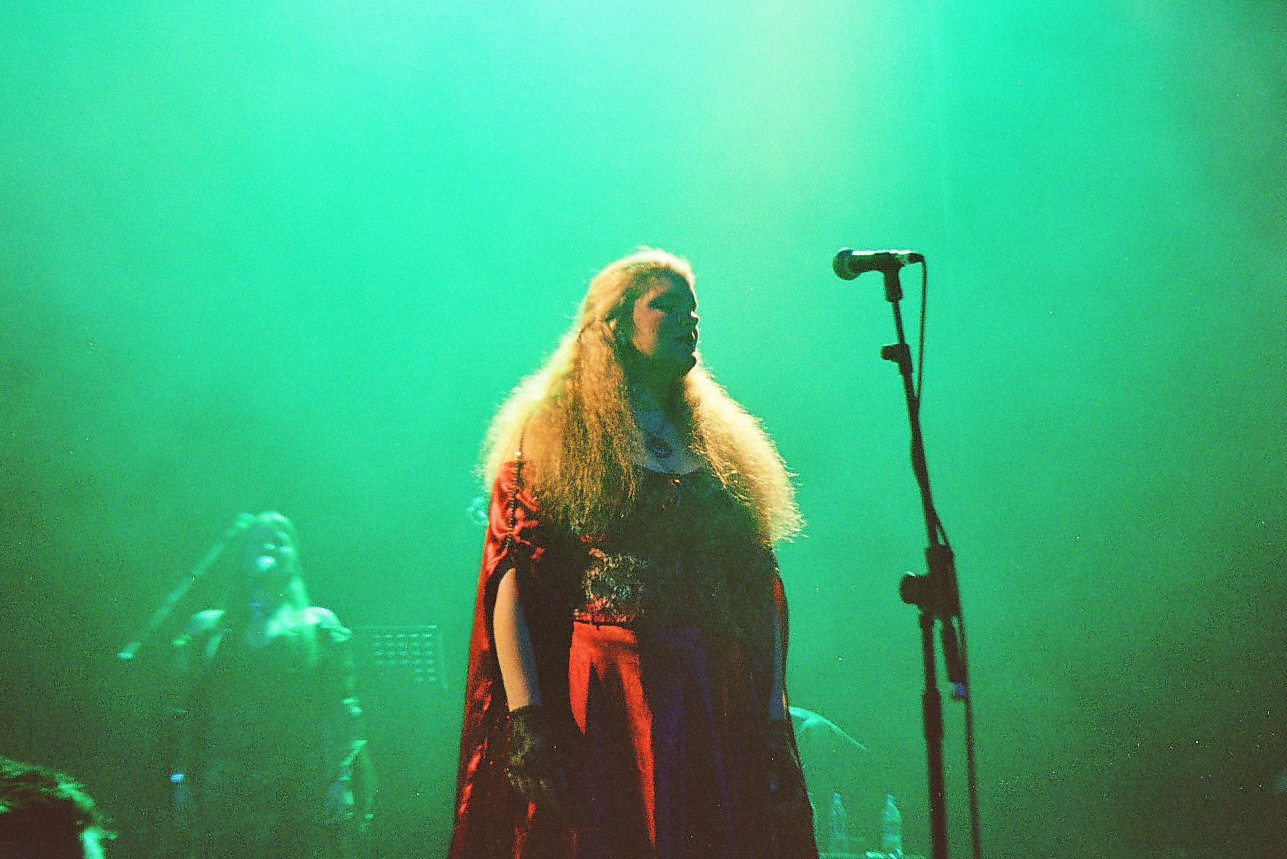
Karin Fjellander

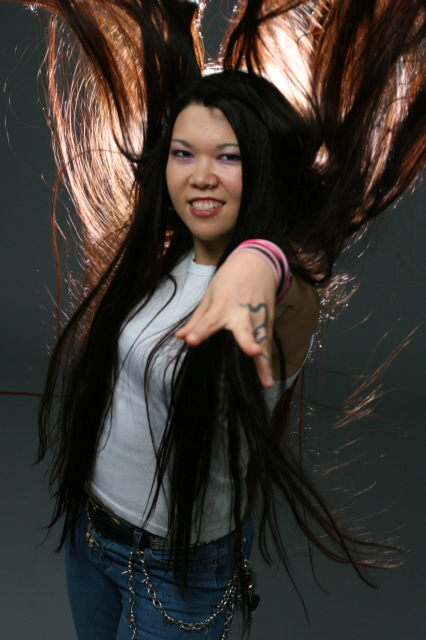
Kimberly Goss

This is a list of Therion's current, former, guest, live members and people directly related to the band. For detailed information, such as voice range or specified song appearance, see the proper album article of the relevant year.

== Current members ==
- Christofer Johnsson – guitars, keyboards, programming, Hammond organ, orchestral arrangement (1987–present), vocals (1987–2006)
- Sami Karppinen – drums (1998–2003, 2017–present)
- Thomas Vikström – lead vocals (2007–present)
- Nalle "Grizzly" Påhlsson – bass (2008–present; touring only 2008–2019)
- Christian Vidal – guitar (2009–present)
- Lori Lewis – vocals (2007–present; not touring 2014–2023)

== Former members ==
- Erik Gustafsson – bass (1987–1991)
- Mats Levén – vocals, guitars (2004–2007, May 2019)
- Oskar Forss – drums (1987–1992)
- Peter Hansson – guitars, keyboards (1987–1992)
- Matti Kärki – vocals (1989)
- Andreas "Wallan" Wahl – bass (1992–1994)
- Piotr Wawrzeniuk – drums, vocals (1992–1997)
- Magnus Barthelson – guitars (1992–1994)
- Fredrik Isaksson – bass (1994–1995)
- Lars Rosenberg – bass (1996–1997)
- Jonas Mellberg – guitars (1995–1996)
- Johan Niemann – bass (1999–2008)
- Kristian Niemann – guitars (1999–2009)
- Richard Evensand – drums (2001–2004)
- Petter Karlsson – drums (2004–2008)
- Johan Koleberg – drums (2008–2016)

== Current live members ==
- Rosalía Sairem – vocals (2019–present)
- Chris Davidsson – bass, backing vocals (2021–present)

== Former live members ==
- Dan Lonard – keyboards (1994–1996)
- Kimberly Goss – keyboards, vocals (1996–1997)
- Ann-Sofie – vocals (1996)
- Jan – vocals (1996)
- Piotr Wawrzeniuk – vocals (1997)
- Kim Blomkvist – bass (1998)
- Cinthia Acosta Vera – vocals (1998)
- Martina Astner – vocals (1998–1999)
- Risto Hämäläinen – vocals (2000–2006)
- Petra Aho – vocals (2001)
- Johanna Mårlöv – vocals (2001, 2004–2006; died 2013)
- Jari-Petri Heino – vocals (2001, 2004–2006)
- Anders Engberg – vocals (2001)
- Maria Ottoson – vocals (2001)
- Suvi Virtanen – vocals (2001, 2004–2006)
- Karin Fjellander – vocals (2004–2006)
- Snowy Shaw – vocals (2006–2010, 2010–2012, 2013)
- Katarina Lilja – vocals (2006–2007, 2008–2011)
- Thomas Vikström vocals (2007–2009)
- Piotr Wawrzeniuk – vocals (2007)
- Messiah Marcolin – vocals (2007)
- Ferdy Doernberg – keyboards (2007)
- Magnus Barthelson – guitars (2008)
- Linnéa Vikström – vocals (2010–2018)
- Waldemar Sorychta – bass (2010–2011)
- Therese Person – vocals (2011)
- Stefan Jernståhl – keyboards (2012)
- Sandra Laureano – vocals (2014)
- Sami Karppinen – drums (2014)
- Isa García Navas – vocals (2015, 2019)
- Chiara Malvestiti – vocals (2015–2023)
- Emmie Asplund – vocals (2015–2018 as stand-in)
- Fredrik Andersson – drums (2017)
- Justin Biggs – bass (2019)
- Johan Koleberg – drums (2022)

== Session and guest musicians ==
- Anna Granqvist – vocals (1992)
- Claudia Maria Mokri – vocals (1994)
- Dan Swanö – vocals (1996)
- Peter Tägtgren – guitars (1996)
- Axel Patz – vocals (1996)
- Tobias Sidegård – vocals (1996)
- Jan Peter Genkel – grand piano, keyboards, programming (1996)
- Anja Krenz – vocals (1996)
- Gottfried Koch – programming, keyboards, acoustic guitar (1996)
- Sarah Jezebel Deva – vocals (1997–1999)
- Wolf Simon – drums (1998–1999)
- Jan Kazda – bass (1998–1999)
- Tommy Eriksson – guitars (1998)
- Ralf Scheepers – vocals (1998)
- Martina Astner – vocals (1998–1999)
- Lorentz Aspen – hammond organ (1998–1999)
- Hansi Kürsch – vocals (2000)
- Marika Schonberg – vocals (2001)
- Erika Andersson – vocals (2001)
- Carl Rahmqvist – vocals (2001)
- Piotr Wawrzeniuk – vocals (2004)
- Anne Marie Krawe – vocals (2004)
- Ulrika Skarby – vocals (2004)
- Mats Levén – vocals, guitar (2004–2007)
- Hannah Holgersson – vocals (2006)
- Jonas Samuelsson-Nerbe – vocals (2007)
- Ken Hensley – Hammond organ (2007)
- Joakim Svalberg – Hammond organ (2007)
- Rolf Pilotti – flute (2007)
- Stefan Glaumann – tambourine (2007)
- Karin Fjellander – vocals (2007)
- Anna Nyhlin – vocals (2007)
- Chris Laney – guitars (2009–2010)
- Marcus Jupither – vocals (2009–2010)
- Petter Karlsson – vocals (2009–2010)
- Mats Öberg – harmonica (2009–2010)
- Hans Gardemar – accordion (2010)
- Mika "Michayah Belfagor" Hakola – vocals (2010)
- Snowy Shaw – drums (2020)
- Björn Höglund – drums (2020–2021)

== Timeline ==
Official members only

== Cover artists ==
Artists of cover artworks:

- Thomas Ewerhard (Secret of the Runes, Live in Midgard, Lemuria, Sirius B, Celebrators of Becoming, Gothic Kabbalah, Live Gothic, The Miskolc Experience, Sitra Ahra, Beloved Antichrist)
- Peter Grøn (Theli, A'arab Zaraq – Lucid Dreaming)
- Calle Schewen (Time Shall Tell)
- Gary Querns (Of Darkness...)
- "Nico & Theresa" (Vovin, Crowning of Atlantis, Deggial)
- Kristian Wåhlin (Beyond Sanctorum, Symphony Masses: Ho Drakon Ho Megas, Lepaca Kliffoth)

== Producers ==
- Siegfried Bemm (1998, 2000)
- Jan Peter Genkel (1996–1997)
- Rex Gisslén (1992–1993)
- Stefan Glaumann (2007)
- Christofer Johnsson (since 1987)
- Gottfried Koch (1996–1997)
- Tomas Skogsberg (1990–1991)
- Peter Tägtgren (1997)

== Orchestras and choirs ==
- Barmbek Symphony Orchestra (Theli) (not an actual orchestra, but a library of classic samples humorously named after a subway station next to the band's studio)
- Indigo Orchestra (Vovin, Crowning of Atlantis)
- Kūhn Mixed Choir (Sirius B, Lemuria)
- North German Radio Choir (Theli, A'arab Zaraq – Lucid Dreaming)
- Prague Philharmonic Orchestra (Sirius B, Lemuria)
- Siren Choir (Theli)

== Lyrics ==
- Thomas Karlsson 1996–2010
- Per Albinsson 2018-
