= Riders of the Apocalypse =

Studio album by Demonoid
- Released: 21 September 2004
- Recorded: December 2002
- Genre: Death metal, thrash metal
- Length: 47:04
- Label: Nuclear Blast

Professional ratings
Review scores
Source	Rating
Allmusic	link

Riders of the Apocalypse is the 2nd album of musical side project of Therion band members called Demonoid.

== Track listing ==
- "Wargods" – 5:50
- "Firestorms" – 3:30
- "Witchburners" – 4:31
- "14.th Century Plague" – 3:23
- "Hunger My Consort" – 5:01
- "The Evocation" – 5:13
- "Arrival of the Horsemen" – 6:17
- "End of our Times" – 4:01
- "Death" – 9:18

== Credits ==
- Kristian Niemann - guitar
- Johan Niemann - bass guitar
- Christofer Johnsson - vocals
- Richard Evensand - drums

=== Guest musicians ===
- Gesa Hangen - Cello (also in Therion)
