= SETI (The Kovenant album) =

- Album cover by Joachim Luetke

Studio album by The Kovenant
- Released: 31 March 2003
- Recorded: May/October 2002
- Studios: Woodhouse Studios, Hagen, Germany
- Genres: Industrial metal, cyber metal
- Length: 67:28
- Label: Nuclear Blast
- Producer: Siggi Bemm

The Kovenant chronology
Animatronic (1999)	SETI (2003)

Professional ratings
Review scores
Source	Rating
Chronicles of Chaos	7.5/10
Rock Hard	8.0/10

SETI is the fourth studio album by Norwegian metal band The Kovenant, released in 2003 through Nuclear Blast. Prior to the release of the actual album, Nuclear Blast issued an EP, SETI Club, consisting of two songs and "club versions" of another two songs from SETI.

== Album history ==
After winning their second Norwegian Grammy for Best Hard Rock album in 2000, the band toured Europe and the United States to promote Animatronic. In the United States the band recruited new member Angel, who would play guitars with Psy Coma; he had not a black metal background, but was instead influenced by bands such as Whitesnake. Deciding to take a break from touring and recording the band went on hiatus and the members went on separate ways after they returned to Europe.

During 2002 a remastered version of In Times Before the Light and a re-release of Nexus Polaris were released and by November 2002 the band decided to record a fourth album.

The new album SETI was released In 2003 and the band decided to do more touring than last time. However, this conflicted with Von Blomberg's other projects (e.g. Mayhem) and he had to leave the band. Two touring members were recruited, Küth (of Ram-Zet) on drums and Brat (of Apoptygma Berzerk) on keyboards. With the new line-up The Kovenant went on tour in Europe and the United States.

== Track listing ==
All tracks are written by The Kovenant, except "The Memory Remains" by James Hetfield and Lars Ulrich.

No.	Title	Length
1.	"Cybertrash"	5:57
2.	"Planet of the Apes"	4:04
3.	"Star by Star"	4:23
4.	"Via Negativa"	5:59
5.	"Stillborn Universe"	5:23
6.	"Acid Theater"	4:10
7.	"The Perfect End"	6:50
8.	"Neon"	5:45
9.	"Keepers of the Garden"	5:49
10.	"Pantomime"	6:23
11.	"Hollow Earth"	5:43
12.	"Industrial Twilight"	7:02
Total length:		67:28

Bonus tracks
No.	Title	Length
13.	"Subtopia"	5:29
14.	"The Memory Remains" (Metallica cover)	4:32
Total length:		77:29

== Personnel ==
- Lex Icon - vocals, keyboards
- Psy-Coma - guitars, keyboards, programming
- Von Blomberg - drums

Additional personnel

- Siggi Bemm - additional bass, recording, mixing, mastering, producer (as Dan Diamond)
- Jan Kazda - bass
- Eileen Küpper - vocals (soprano)
- Erik Ljunggren - programming (additional), sound design
- Markus Staiger - executive producer
- Joachim Luetke - cover concept, design
- Espen Tollefsen - photography
- Dennis Koehne - engineering assistant
