= Lord Kaos =

Australian musical group

- Origin: Sydney, New South Wales, Australia
- Genre: Black metal
- Years active: 1994–2001; 2023–present
- Label: Warhead Records
- Members: Astennu; JS Decline; Robert Sakey
- Past members: Jamie Marsh; Incubus; Nigel Chad; Dave Morrison; Ali Chamas; Frank Munozs; Darrell Firth; Shaun Murphy; Beau Dyer; Glen Blazejak; Yuri Ward

Lord Kaos is an Australian black metal band that formed in Sydney in 1994. For several years, the group was a prominent genre act in the country. One founding member recorded and perform with several Norwegian black metal bands including Dimmu Borgir. While Lord Kaos only released one album, the group influenced the local heavy metal music scene as arguably the first and one of a few bands to record and perform Norwegian-style symphonic black metal.

== History ==
Originally a five-piece band formed by guitarist Jamie "Astennu" Stinson and vocalist Jamie "The Lord of Night Summoning" Marsh, they dropped the original drummer in favour of a drum machine, and recorded the demo Path to My Funeral Light in 1995. Later that year, Astennu, Marsh, bassist Incubus and keyboardist Sir Morrison recorded Thorns of Impurity with Astennu tracking guitars. The album was recorded for release on Sydney label Warhead Records but also found interest from Norway's Head Not Found. This caused a split in the group. Astennu relocated to Norway to pursue release there, leaving the remaining band members behind. This delayed the release of Thorns of Impurity. It was not issued, on Warhead, until late 1996. By then, Astennu had completed his first Carpe Tenebrum album, Majestic Nothingness, with vocals from guitarist Nagash of Dimmu Borgir, the band he joined in 1997.

Without Astennu, Lord Kaos came to a standstill. By early 1997, the group reconvened with drummer Nigel Chad, guitarist Frank Munoz of Sydney brutal death metal band Neuropath, two members of Newcastle black metal act Empery of Thorns, guitarist Darael, and keyboards-player Shaun. Incubus left shortly afterwards, replaced with another ex-Neuropath member, Ali Chamas. This line-up remained together for almost two years. At the end of 1997, the band played on the Sydney leg of an Australian tour by Cradle of Filth and began work on a second album. Several tracks were recorded, and "Black Earth" appeared on the 1999 compilation album Under the Southern Cross, from Chatterbox Records. In the meantime, Marsh was singing with doom metal band Elysium, with whom he recorded Dreamscapes in 1998. This recording remained unreleased until 2001, when it surfaced on Melbourne label Crestfallen Records.

Lord Kaos featured at the annual Metal for the Brain festival in Canberra in 1998 but in mid-1999 Munoz and Chamas both left the band. Incubus rejoined for a short time but after Metal for the Brain that year Lord Kaos went into hiatus again. Earlier in 1999 Marsh had joined another black metal act called Crucible of Agony who had played a support show with Impaled Nazarene and recorded several tracks, one of which, "Come Forth to the Lands of the Plague Bearer", would also appear on Under the Southern Cross. This band did little else however and after a complete line-up change evolved later into The Amenta.

By 2000 Lord Kaos was active as a live band once more. Along with Marsh, Darael and Shaun, the group now consisted of Beau Dyer from Elysium on bass and two members of Canberra band Psychrist, Yuri Ward and Glen Blazejak, on guitar and drums respectively. This version of the band featured at Metal for the Brain before playing some shows in early 2001, however several other performances were cancelled and in December Lord Kaos announced it had disbanded

Marsh has always remained open to the possibility of Lord Kaos reforming in the future, however this is probably unlikely. His other band Elysium, which also features Dyer, changed its name to Stone Wings in 2003 and released the self-funded album Bird of Stone Wings in 2004. Ward and Blazejak continued to play together in Psychrist until the drummer left in 2003 and the band folded. Ward is now a member of a band called Kill for Satan who have released one album. Astennu was fired from Dimmu Borgir in 1999 and since returning to Australia has recorded a third Carpe Tenebrum album and played in bands including Infernal Method and Stronger Than Hate but since 2003 has concentrated on sound engineering.

In February 2024, Astennu announced on his Youtube channel, two founding members Jamie Marsh and Incubus quit the band due to creative differences, and was replaced by new vocalist JS Decline and bassist Habatu.

In late December 2024 during the interview with Scars and Guitars, Astennu admitted he fired Jamie Marsh, and Incubus for personal reasons, in regards to the Head Not Found incident.

== Band members ==
Current members

- Jamie Stinson (Astennu) – guitar, drum programming, keyboards (1994–1997; 2023–present)
- JS Decline – vocals (2024–present)
- Robert Sakey (Habatu) – bass (2024–present)

Former members

- Jamie Marsh (Lord of Night Summoning) – vocals (1994–2001; 2023–2024)
- Incubus – bass (1994–1997; 1999; 2023–2024)
- Nigel Chad – drums (1994; 1997–2000)
- Dave Morrison (Octavious) – keyboards (1994–1997)
- Ali Chamas – bass (1997–1999)
- Frank Munozs – guitar (1997–1999)
- Darrell Firth (Demicon) – guitar (1997–2001)
- Shaun Murphy – keyboards (1997–2001)
- Beau Dyer – bass (2000–2001)
- Glen Blazejak – drums (2000–2001)
- Yuri Ward – guitar (2000–2001)

== Discography ==
- Path to My Funeral Light (Demo) (1995)
- Thorns of Impurity (1996)

Lord Kaos – Cultus “(Single)” – (2024)
