= Astennu =

Australian heavy metal musician

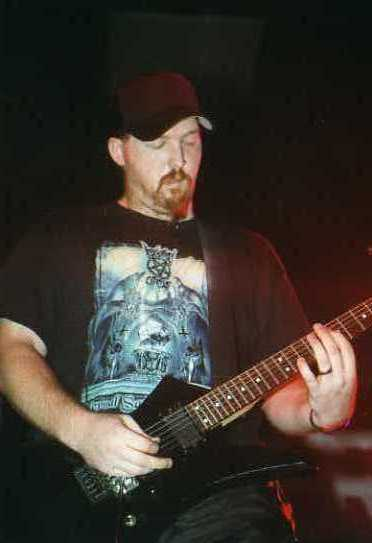

Background information
- Born: James Stinson; Sydney, New South Wales, Australia
- Genres: Black metal; death metal
- Occupations: Musician; songwriter; sound engineer
- Instruments: Guitar; bass; vocals; keyboard; drum programming
- Years active: 1993–present

Jamie Stinson, known professionally as Astennu, is an Australian heavy metal musician. His name is derived from a creature in Egyptian mythology.

== Biography ==
Astennu first came to notice as the guitarist and songwriter for the Australian black metal band Lord Kaos. The band recorded both the demo Path to My Funeral Light and a full-length album Thorns of Impurity in 1995. Before the album's release Astennu went to Norway and found interest in the album from Head Not Found Records however the other members of the band decided to remain in Australia and Thorns of Impurity was released by Sydney label Warhead Records in 1996. Astennu stayed in Norway and reworked some music he had written for Lord Kaos into songs for a solo project called Carpe Tenebrum.

The first Carpe Tenebrum album Majestic Nothingness featured Astennu on all instruments with vocals from Nagash of Dimmu Borgir and The Kovenant. It was released in 1997. Later the same year, Astennu joined Dimmu Borgir on guitar, freeing Shagrath to concentrate on vocals. Astennu's first recording with the band was the 1998 EP Godless Savage Garden. He was also a member of Nagash's other band, The Kovenant, at that time and was featured on the band's 1998 album Nexus Polaris. He also contributed some guitar solos to the Aggressor album and the Triumph of the Blasphemer EP by Nocturnal Breed, a band that also featured Dimmu Borgir's other guitarist Silenoz.

A second Carpe Tenebrum album, Mirrored Hate Painting, again featuring Nagash, was released in 1999. Astennu's second album with Dimmu Borgir, Spiritual Black Dimensions was released the same year, on 2 March. During the tour in support of the album, Astennu was fired from Dimmu Borgir and returned to Australia in late 1999.

Once back in Australia, Astennu worked as a live sound engineer for a number of bands on the Sydney heavy metal scene and also acted as mixer, engineer and producer on a number of albums and releases. In 2002 he recorded and released a third Carpe Tenebrum album, Dreaded Chaotic Reign, this time performing vocals himself. Dreaded Chaotic Reign was a death metal album whereas previous Carpe Tenebrum recordings had been black metal. In May 2003, Astennu returned to the live circuit with Sydney band Infernal Method, for whom he had been engineering for several months.

== Discography ==
With Lord Kaos

- Thorns of Impurity (Warhead Records, 1996)

With Dimmu Borgir

- Godless Savage Garden (Nuclear Blast, 1998)
- Spiritual Black Dimensions (Nuclear Blast, 1999)

With Covenant

- Nexus Polaris (Nuclear Blast, 1998)

With Nocturnal Breed (as guest)

- Aggressor (Hammerheart Records, 1997)
- Triumph of the Blasphemer (Hammerheart Records, 1998)

With Carpe Tenebrum

- Majestic Nothingness (Head Not Found, 1997)
- Mirrored Hate Painting (Hammerheart Records, 1999)
- Dreaded Chaotic Reign (Hammerheart Records, 2002)
