= Ebony Tears =

Swedish death metal band

- Also known as: ET
- Origin: Stockholm, Sweden
- Genres: Melodic death metal Thrash metal
- Years active: 1996−2001
- Label: Black Sun
- Members: Johnny Wranning; Conny Jonsson; Thomas Thun; Peter Kahm; Richard Evensand; Peter Tuthill; Iman Zolgharnian

Ebony Tears were a Swedish death metal band that started playing the melodic death metal that was prevalent in the Swedish death metal scene at the time, bearing a strong resemblance to the latter-day sound of At the Gates.

On their final album, the band began to play a modern thrash style of metal, akin to the bands which formed in the wake of the demise of At the Gates, namely The Haunted.

Ebony Tears disbanded after the release of their final album, Evil as Hell in 2001. The album was released on Century Media Records. All members joined Dog Faced Gods.

== Discography ==
- Tortura Insomniae (1997)
- A Handful of Nothing (1999)
- Evil as Hell (2001)

== Credits ==
- Richard Evensand − Drums (ex-Chimaira, Dog Faced Gods, ex-Southpaw, ex-Soilwork, Sorcerer, Demonoid)
- Conny Jonsson − Guitar (Dog Faced Gods)
- Peter Kahm − Bass (Dog Faced Gods)
- Johnny Wranning − Vocals (Miscreant, Dog Faced Gods, Eyetrap, ex-Månegarm)
