= In Times Before the Light =

Studio album by Covenant
- Released: 1997
- Recorded: Autumn 1995
- Studio: X-Ray Studios, Sarpsborg, Norway
- Genre: Symphonic black metal; melodic black metal
- Length: 50:38
- Label: Mordgrimm
- Producer: Covenant & Sire Johannesen

Covenant chronology
From the Storm of Shadows (1994)	In Times Before the Light (1997)	Nexus Polaris (1998)

Remixed edition cover
- 2002 remix

Re-release cover
- 2007 re-release

Professional ratings
Review scores
Source	Rating
Collector's Guide to Heavy Metal	6/10

In Times Before the Light is the debut album by Norwegian black metal band Covenant, released in 1997 through the British underground label Mordgrimm.

== Album history ==
In Times Before the Light is the first album by the band (at that time called Covenant) and was recorded in the fall of 1995. The only members at the time were Nagash and Blackheart. The album is considered to be symphonic black metal and provided Covenant a good fan base in Norway. The album was created when Nagash and Blackheart were about 17 years of age. The release was significantly delayed due to loss of album artwork in shipment to the record company.

A re-recorded version of In Times Before the Light was released in 2002 through Hammerheart Records because Nagash and Blackheart (now 'Lex Icon' and 'Psy Coma') were not satisfied with the original release. Covenant were also forced to change their name to The Kovenant due to a dispute with a Swedish electronic band of the same name. The outcome is significantly different from the original, being an industrial and electronic version of the original symphonic black metal album. The remixed tracks are longer, various elements were added to them and many parts were re-recorded.

The album was re-released on 26 January 2007 through VME/Head Not Found as In Times Before the Light 1995, with tracks from their 1994 demo From the Storm of Shadows as bonus content. The material was remastered by Tom Kvalsvoll at Strype Audio.

On 29 October 2011, Nagash did a one-time only performance of the entire album at the Aurora Infernalis III festival in Arnhem, Netherlands. Except for Nagash, no other members of the current incarnation of the band participated.

On 11 October 2016, Aurora Infernalis announced that an LP of the original album would be released. Since the album was never released as an LP the record label decided that "in January 2017 it will be out on 180gr gatefold LP with a 12-page full color booklet. It is limited to 666 copies (466 black, 200 splatter) and comes with the original artwork that was lost back in the day. Kutargic made the artwork in 1995, but it was never used on the different CD versions." This LP will contain an original artwork.

== Track listing ==
No.	Title	Length
1.	"Towards the Crown of Nights"	5:50
2.	"Dragonstorms"	4:58
3.	"The Dark Conquest"	6:54
4.	"From the Storm of Shadows"	5:13
5.	"Night of the Blackwinds"	3:40
6.	"The Chasm"	3:44
7.	"Visions of a Lost Kingdom"	3:26
8.	"Through the Eyes of the Raven"	5:00
9.	"In Times Before the Light"	5:59
10.	"Monarch of the Mighty Darkness"	5:54
Total length:		50:38

2002 remix
No.	Title	Length
1.	"Towards the Crown of Nights"	6:29
2.	"Dragonstorms"	5:19
3.	"The Dark Conquest"	7:39
4.	"From the Storm of Shadows"	5:34
5.	"Night of the Blackwinds"	3:56
6.	"The Chasm"	4:39
7.	"Visions of a Lost Kingdom"	5:56
8.	"Through the Eyes of the Raven"	5:04
9.	"In Times Before the Light"	6:04
10.	"Monarch of the Mighty Darkness"	6:15
Total length:		56:55

2007 remastered re-release
No.	Title	Length
11.	"In Times Before the Light" (from the From the Storm of Shadows demo)	6:25
12.	"Visions of a Lost Kingdom" (from the From the Storm of Shadows demo)	3:05
13.	"from the Storm of Shadows" (from the From the Storm of Shadows demo)	6:08
Total length:		66:35

== Personnel ==
- N. Blackheart – vocals, drums, keyboards, producer
- T. Blackheart – guitars, bass, keyboards, producer
- Pål Espen (Sire) Johannessen – producer, engineering
- Digitally mastered at The Exchange; executive production by Noctis Irae
- All symphonies arranged and composed by Covenant during the period 1992–1995
- All poetry penned by Covenant between the years 1993–1995
- Cover painting by Alex Kurtagić
- Logo by Christophe Szpajdel
- Portraits taken by Close Up
- Art design conceived by Covenant
- Layout and design executed by Digitalis

=== 2002 remix ===
- Lex Icon – vocals, drums, producer
- Psy Coma – guitars, bass, keyboards, programming, engineer, producer
- Sensei Bogus – additional bass, additional programming
- Bjørn Boge – producer, mixing, engineering, additional recording, drum editing
- Tommy Svensson – artwork, layout
- Peder Klingwall – photography

=== 2007 remaster ===
- Kharon – Bass (on tracks 11–13)
