= Animatronics (disambiguation) =

Animatronics is the use of mechatronics to create machines which simulate animate life with lifelike characteristics.

Animatronics may also refer to:

- Animatronic (album), by the Kovenant
- Ana Matronic, American singer
- Audio-Animatronics, a form of robotics created by Walt Disney Imagineering
