= Deggial =

Studio album by Therion
- Released: 31 January 2000
- Recorded: September − November 1999
- Studio: Woodhouse Studio (Hagen, Germany)
- Genre: Symphonic metal, hard rock
- Length: 57:56
- Label: Nuclear Blast; NB 442-2
- Producer: Siegfried Bemm

Therion chronology
Crowning of Atlantis (1999)	Deggial (2000)	Secret of the Runes (2001)

Professional ratings
Review scores
Source	Rating
Allmusic	3/5 stars
Kerrang!	4/5 stars

Deggial is the ninth studio album by Swedish symphonic metal band Therion in 2000. As with many of Therion's other albums, Deggial features a choir and orchestra.

In 2021, it was elected by Metal Hammer as the 8th best symphonic metal album of all time.

== Track listing ==
All lyrics are written by Thomas Karlsson except where noted; all music is composed by Christofer Johnsson.

No.	Title	Length
1.	"Seven Secrets of the Sphinx"	3:36
2.	"Eternal Return"	7:10
3.	"Enter Vril-Ya"	6:38
4.	"Ship of Luna"	6:28
5.	"The Invincible"	5:09
6.	"Deggial"	5:03
7.	"Emerald Crown"	5:29
8.	"The Flight of the Lord of Flies"	1:22
9.	"Flesh of the Gods"	4:04
10.	"Via Nocturna": Part 1: "The Path"; Part 2: "Hexentanz"	9:30
11.	"O Fortuna" (Carl Orff cover)	3:21
Total length:		57:56

Japanese edition bonus tracks
No.	Title	Length
12.	"To Mega Therion" (live)	6:38
13.	"The Wings of the Hydra" (live)	3:21
14.	"Black Sun" (live)	5:45
Total length:		73:40

- Tracks 12–14 from Crowning of Atlantis.

== Personnel ==
- Christofer Johnsson – guitar, keyboards
- Kristian Niemann – lead guitar
- Johan Niemann – bass guitar
- Sami Karppinen – drums
- Thomas Karlsson – lyrics (except "O Fortuna")

=== Guest musicians ===
- Hansi Kürsch – lead vocals on "Flesh of the Gods"
- Jan Kazda – acoustic guitar
- Waldemar Sorychta – acoustic guitar on "O Fortuna"
- Alexander Schimmeroth – piano

=== Choir ===
- Eileen Küpper – soprano (choir, solo)
- Angelica Märtz – soprano (choir)
- Dorothea Fischer – alto (choir)
- Anne Tributh – alto (choir)
- Georg Hansen – tenor (choir, solo)
- Miguel Rosales – tenor (choir)
- Jörg Braüker – bass (choir, solo)
- Javier Zapater – bass (choir)

=== Orchestra ===
- Heike Haushalter – first violin
- Petra Stalz – second violin
- Monika Maltek – viola
- Gesa Hangen – cello
- Konstantin Weinstroer – double bass
- Annette Gadatsch – flute
- Stefanie Dietz – oboe
- John Ellis – French horn
- Volker Goetz – flugelhorn, trumpet
- Dietrich Geese – tuba, sousaphone, trumpet
- Daniel Häcker – timpani

=== Technical personnel ===
- Nico & Theresa – cover art

== Charts ==
Chart (2000)	Peak position
German Albums (Offizielle Top 100)	43
