= Twin Obscenity =

Norwegian metal band

- Origin: Stavanger, Norway
- Genres: Black metal Blackened death metal Viking metal
- Years active: 1991–200?
- Labels: Head Not Found, Century Media
- Members: Atle Wiig; Jo Arild Tønnessen; Knut Næsje; Tonje Ettesvoll
- Past members: Alexander Twiss; Mona Undheim Skottene

Twin Obscenity is a Norwegian death/black metal band. They borrowed their name from Zhar and Lloigor, collectively known as the Twin Obscenities, in the Cthulhu Mythos.

== History ==
Discussions about starting a band (which later became Twin Obscenity) started in 1989 with drummer Knut Næsje, who went to the same primary school as bassist Jo-Arild Tønnessen. Twin Obscenity was founded in 1991 when, in high school, singer/guitarist/keyboardist Atle Wiig met Tønnessen, who had previously been playing with Naesje. Over the next few years they recorded three demo tapes.

Twin Obscenity's debut album, Where Light Touches None, was released in the summer of ‘97 on the Norwegian label Head Not Found. The group toured Europe after the album's release. After the band signed to Century Media Records in the beginning of 1998 they recorded their second album, For Blood, Honor and Soil.

Tønnessen, who was born in Stavanger, graduated as a software engineer in 1997, and has worked in the field since. He is married and has three children.

Jo Arild and Knut Næsje together with singer Remi S. formed 2nd Insanity in 2017. 2nd Insanity is scheduled to release 4 singles in Januar/February 2019.

== Members ==
- Atle Wiig - vocals, guitar
- Jo Arild Tønnessen - bass
- Knut Næsje - drums
- Steffen Simenstad - vocals (Gehenna (band), ex-Forlorn)
- Tonje Ettesvold - vocals

=== Former members ===
- Alexander Twiss (1997–1998) - guitars
- Mona Undheim Skottene (1997–1998) - keyboards, vocals

== Discography ==
- Behind the Castle Walls (Demo, 1993)
- Ruins (Demo, 1993)
- Revelations Of Glaaki (Demo, 1995)
- Where Light Touches None (Full-length, Head Not Found Records, 1997)
- For Blood, Honor and Soil (Full-length, Century Media, 1999)
- Bloodstone (Full-length, Century Media, 2001)
