= Shadowseeds =

Shadowseeds II is a dark wave/esoterical musical project consisting of Thomas Karlsson and Tommie Eriksson, who before 1999 spelled his name Tommy Eriksson.

Shadowseeds released their first album The Dream of Lilith in 1995 on Dark Age/Megarock Records. The album was hardly at all promoted by the label and it sank with inertia into an esoteric underground cult status.

In 2002, after exactly seven years of silence, the project was resurrected.

Thomas wrote a unique text about the 17th-century Swedish occultist Johannes Bureus which created the basis for a live performance at the Ecstatic Society/Fylkingen in Stockholm together with acts like Ordo Rosarius Equilibrio and Coph Nia.

In March 2003 Shadowseeds II performed at the Pandemonium Club in Gothenburg. In 2004 the first release was out based on the live performances. The CD-r is titled Der Mitternacht Löwe and the sleeve is designed into a limited edition envelope shaped cover that captures the old tradition of the concept.
