= Nexus Polaris =

Studio album by Covenant
- Released: 24 March 1998
- Recorded: August–September 1997
- Studio: Woodhouse Studios, Hagen, Germany
- Genre: Symphonic black metal, melodic black metal
- Length: 43:32
- Label: Nuclear Blast
- Producer: Siggi Bemm

Covenant chronology
In Times Before the Light (1997)	Nexus Polaris (1998)	Animatronic (1999)

Professional ratings
Review scores
Source	Rating
AllMusic	4/5 stars
Chronicles of Chaos	8/10
Collector's Guide to Heavy Metal	8/10
Rock Hard	9.0/10
Sputnikmusic	4/5

Nexus Polaris is the second studio album by the Norwegian metal band Covenant, and was released in 1998 through Nuclear Blast.

This is the final album that the band would release under their Covenant name, as the following year the group would change their name to The Kovenant, where they would begin performing electronic/industrial metal as opposed to symphonic black metal.

== Album history ==
The original album In Times Before the Light was successful at staging a fan base in the black metal scene in Norway. Nagash and Blackheart had greater ambitions for the band and wanted better production and pay for their music. Record label Nuclear Blast caught eye of the band and Covenant (as the band was known at that time) signed with them.

Starting the new album, Nagash and Blackheart wanted to form an actual band this time. They enlisted guitarist, Astennu (who was playing in Dimmu Borgir at the time with Nagash), keyboardist Sverd (of Arcturus), Sarah Jezebel Deva (of Cradle of Filth and other bands), and Hellhammer (of Mayhem). Nagash took over bass and vocal duties, while Blackheart played guitar.

Thanks to Nuclear Blast's promotion, Nexus Polaris was successful and allowed Covenant to do a two-week tour and to be on Norwegian national television for six days. Covenant were nominated for a Norwegian Grammy, whose ceremony they attended winning for Best Hard Rock band, the first ever. This performance also signed Covenant's shift, moving from black metal to a more industrial metal sound.

A re-release of Nexus Polaris was made in 2002. The original tracks were left untouched (unlike the remixed edition of In Times Before the Light, also from 2002), but two versions of "New World Order", a song from their 1999 album Animatronic, were included as a bonus.

On 11 April 2024, The Kovenant posted on their Facebook page their intention of performing Nexus Polaris live in its entirety, starting in Eindhoven, The Netherlands on 13 and 14 of December. The caption read "The first of many. Coming soon to a city near you. Nexus set plus songs from In Times Before The Light and Animatronic teasing more shows coming up in the future.

== Track listing ==
No.	Title	Length
1.	"The Sulphur Feast"	04:10
2.	"Bizarre Cosmic Industries"	05:51
3.	"Planetarium"	04:01
4.	"The Last of Dragons"	06:28
5.	"Bringer of the Sixth Sun"	06:32
6.	"Dragonheart"	04:52
7.	"Planetary Black Elements"	05:50
8.	"Chariots of Thunder"	05:48
Total length:		43:32

2000 re-release bonus tracks
No.	Title	Length
9.	"New World Order" (Clubmix)	04:26
10.	"New World Order" (Metalmix)	03:53
Total length:		51:51

== Personnel ==
- Nagash – vocals, bass
- Blackheart – guitar
- Astennu – guitar
- Sverd – keyboards
- Sarah Jezebel Deva – vocals
- Hellhammer – drums

=== Additional personnel ===
- Per Heimly – photography
- Flea Black – artwork, layout
- Mathias – engineering
- Siggi Bemm – producer, mastering
- Andreas Marschall – cover art
- Christophe Szpajdel – logo
