= Eileen Küpper =

South Africa-born soprano singer

Eileen Küpper is a South Africa-born soprano singer, known for her work with metal bands Therion and The Kovenant.

== Discography ==
=== Solo ===
- #TOCA 12061 Shapes (2003)

=== With Therion ===
- Vovin (1998)
- Crowning of Atlantis (1999)
- Deggial (2000)

=== With The Kovenant ===
- Animatronic (1999)
- SETI (2003)
