= The Kovenant =

Norwegian metal band

- Also known as: Covenant (1993−1999)
- Origin: Hamar, Norway
- Genres: Industrial metal, cyber metal, symphonic black metal (early)
- Years active: 1993−2011; 2024−present
- Labels: Mordgrimm, Nuclear Blast, Hammerheart, Head Not Found
- Members: Lex Icon; Psy Coma; Hellhammer; Ghul; Sarah Jezebel Deva; Sverd; Knut Magne Valle
- Past members: (see below)

The Kovenant is a Norwegian industrial metal band from Hamar. The band formed as symphonic black metal act Covenant in 1993, but changed their name to The Kovenant in 1999 due to a dispute with a Swedish band of the same name. The name change marked a change in style. The band focused on a cyber/industrial metal sound influenced by Europe's EBM scene. The Kovenant later reissued their early albums under The Kovenant name.

== History ==
=== The "Covenant" years (1994–1999) ===
The band was formed as Covenant in 1993 by black metal musicians Nagash and Blackheart. They met when Blackheart helped Nagash with his one-man project, Troll. They released the demo From the Storm of Shadows, and signed with label Mordgrimm, which released In Times Before the Light in 1997. This album was recorded in 1995 and established them a fan base in Norway. It sounds similar to Dimmu Borgir's For all tid. Nagash is a friend of Dimmu Borgir singer Shagrath.

Covenant signed with Nuclear Blast in 1998 and recruited Astennu (of Dimmu Borgir, Carpe Tenebrum), Sverd (of Arcturus), Sarah Jezebel Deva (of Cradle of Filth and others), and Hellhammer (of Mayhem and others). This lineup released Nexus Polaris. The album won the band a Norwegian Grammy for Best Hard Rock Band, and led to Nagash leaving Dimmu Borgir (for which he played bass) to concentrate on The Kovenant.

=== Name change and Animatronic era (1999–2002) ===
After Nexus Polaris, Sverd, Astennu, and Sarah left the band for "various reasons". Nagash, Blackheart, and Hellhammer remained. A Swedish band of the same name sued them, arguing that they owned the name "Covenant" and had been known as such before Nagash and Blackheart formed their band. They changed their name to The Covenant, but adding "The" did not suffice, because a Dutch heavy metal band had been The Covenant since 1988. So they kept "The" and replaced the "C" with a "K", leading to their current name.

In 1999, The Kovenant recorded and released Animatronic, which featured an industrial sound. The band changed their stage names to suit their new direction. Nagash became "Lex Icon", Blackheart became "Psy Coma", and Hellhammer became "Von Blomberg". The new album won them another Norwegian Grammy. Angel joined while touring the USA.

After the Animatronic tour, Nagash and Blackheart re-recorded In Times Before the Light. Nuclear Blast was not interested, so they released it through Hammerheart Records. They re-released Nexus Polaris during 2002.

=== SETI and the wait for Aria Galactica (2002–present) ===
In 2002, the band recorded SETI, their fourth album. The full-length release was preceded by the promotional EP SETI Club, both issued in 2003. Hellhammer left the band for other projects. They recruited drummer Küth (of Ram-Zet) and Brat (of Apoptygma Berzerk) on keyboards. They toured Europe and the United States to promote the album.

The band was working on a DVD and an album titled Aria Galactica. Nagash announced that they had written 14 pieces. The album would come with a second disc consisting of symphonic renditions of tracks from the primary disc, suggesting a return to the symphonic style of Nexus Polaris.

The following announcement was seen at Lex's blog:

The Kovenant fans will have to wait a few more months for us to begin recording Aria Galactica. Progress is slow but getting there. Working on the vocals atm, and finding a good studio that has open timeslots. Aria Galactica will be our best album... by far.

— Lex Icon

In an interview in August 2007, Blackheart described Aria Galactica as "technical", with more guitar solos, "much stronger" and different from SETI. The estimated release date was Christmas 2007. He denied any relationship between Aria Galactica and the DVD, which would be "completely megalomaniac project of making a documentary of [their] entire band history".

In 2007, the band re-released their debut album as In Times before the Light 1995.

In October 2009, The Kovenant were confirmed to perform Nexus Polaris with the original members at the Inferno Festival in Norway, spring of 2010. The Kovenant, along with Mayhem, Finntroll and Taake, were the first four bands to be on the Festival's bill.

In February 2010, Nagash revealed on his Myspace page, "Yes, we are working on the new album again. And No, The Kovenant is not disbanded. ... Going according to schedule. Just have to get the business side out of the way. (As in what record company it will be released on etc). And we might start having open try-outs for some new blood in the very near future."

In December 2010, Nagash shared, "So many things will happen next year... New Troll album, Razor Runner album++, and if the universe doesn't stab us in the back; there shall be a new The Kovenant album. Cold hails from Norway!", showing that the album and band were not abandoned.

On 29 October 2011, Nagash played a one-time performance of their debut album at the Aurora Infernalis III festival in Arnhem, Netherlands. Except for Nagash, no members of the current incarnation of the band participated.

On 28 January 2024, Photograve Management, an artist management company, posted a photo on their Facebook page of the band in the studio with the caption "The [K]ovenant are back! More info soon." The Kovenant shared the post on their Facebook the following day.

On 11 April 2024, The Kovenant posted an poster on their Facebook page saying they would perform Nexus Polaris live in its entirety, starting in Eindhoven, The Netherlands on 13 and 14 of December. The caption read, "The first of many. Coming soon to a city near you. Nexus set plus songs from In Times Before The Light and Animatronic" teasing more shows coming up.

== Band members ==
Current

- Stian Hinderson (Nagash/Lex Icon) − drums (1993-1998; 2002), vocals, keyboards (1993–present), bass (1998-present)
- Amund Svensson (Blackheart/Psy Coma/Pzy-Clone) − bass (1994-1998; 2002), guitar, keyboards, programming (1993−2002; 2002–present)
- Jan Axel Blomberg (Hellhammer/von Blomberg) - drums (1998–2003; 2024-present)
- Charles Hedger (Ghul) - guitar (2025-present)
- Sarah Jezebel Deva − female vocals (1998; 2024-present)
- Steinar Sverd Johnsen - keyboards (1998; 2024-present)

Live/session

- Kine Hult − keyboards (1998)
- Jan Axel Blomberg (Hellhammer/von Blomberg) - drums (2009–2010)
- Sarah Jezebel Deva − female vocals (2009-2010)
- Steinar Sverd Johnsen - keyboards (2009-2010)
- Knut Magne Valle - guitar (2024-present)

Former

- Shnaga - drums (1993)
- Eileen Küpper – female vocals (1999–2003)
- Kent "Küth" Frydenlund − drums (2003−2009)
- Geir Bratland (Gerlioz)keyboards (2003−2009)
- Kharon - Bass (1994)
- Audun Stengel (Angel) - guitar (2000–2010)
- Jamie Stinson (Astennu) − guitar (1998−1999; 2024-2025)

== Awards ==
Year	Award	Category	Work
1998	Spellemannprisen	Hard rock	Nexus Polaris
1999	Spellemannprisen	Hard rock	Animatronic

== Discography ==
=== Studio albums ===
Year	Album details	Notes
1997	In Times Before the Light: Released: 1997; Label: Mordgrimm	Released as Covenant; Complete remix released on 3 September 2002 as The Kovenant; Remastered released in 2007 as The Kovenant
1998	Nexus Polaris: Released: 24 March 1998; Label: Nuclear Blast	Released as Covenant; Reissued in 2000 as The Kovenant
1999	Animatronic: Released: 16 November 1999; Label: Nuclear Blast	
2003	SETI: Released: 31 March 2003; Label: Nuclear Blast	

=== EPs ===
Year	Album details	Notes
2003	S.E.T.I. 4-Track Club EP: Released: 6 February 2003; Label: Nuclear Blast	

=== Demos ===
Year	Album details	Notes
1994	From the Storm of Shadows: Released: December 1994; Label: Independent	Released as Covenant
1995	Promo 1995: Released: August 1995; Label: Independent	Released as Covenant

Awards
Preceded by Motorpsycho	Recipient of the Hard rock Spellemannprisen; 1998/1999	Succeeded by Sensa Anima
