= Animatronic (album) =

Studio album by The Kovenant
- Released: 16 November 1999
- Studio: Woodhouse Studios, Hagen, Germany
- Genre: Industrial metal, symphonic metal
- Length: 51:07
- Label: Nuclear Blast
- Producer: Siggy Bemm

The Kovenant chronology
Nexus Polaris (1998)	Animatronic (1999)	SETI (2003)

Professional ratings
Review scores
Source	Rating
AllMusic	3.5/5 stars
Collector's Guide to Heavy Metal	7/10
Rock Hard	8.0/10

Animatronic is the third studio album by Norwegian metal band The Kovenant, released in 1999 through Nuclear Blast.

== Track listing ==
All tracks are written by The Kovenant, except "Spaceman" by Jas Mann.

No.	Title	Length
1.	"Mirrors Paradise"	5:01
2.	"New World Order"	4:30
3.	"Mannequin"	5:00
4.	"Sindrom"	5:30
5.	"Jihad"	5:58
6.	"The Human Abstract"	4:55
7.	"Prophecies of Fire"	4:38
8.	"In the Name of the Future"	4:56
9.	"Spaceman" (Babylon Zoo cover)	5:23
10.	"The Birth of Tragedy"	5:16
Total length:		51:07

== Personnel ==
- Lex Icon – vocals, bass
- Psy Coma – guitars, keyboards, programming
- Von Blomberg – drums

Additional personnel

- Eileen Küpper – vocals (soprano)
- Matthias Klinkmann – engineering
- Siggy Bemm – producer
- Per Heimly – photography
