= Mirrored Hate Painting =

Studio album by Carpe Tenebrum
- Released: Spring 1999
- Recorded: Winter 1998/1999 at The Abyss
- Genre: Symphonic black metal
- Length: 39:56
- Label: Hammerheart

Carpe Tenebrum chronology
Majestic Nothingness (1997)	Mirrored Hate Painting (1999)	Dreaded Chaotic Reign (2002)

Mirrored Hate Painting is the second studio album by the Norwegian black metal band Carpe Tenebrum. It was recorded in winter 1998 at The Abyss Studio and released in 1999 through Karmageddon Media. Stylistically the album is similar to Dimmu Borgir's Spiritual Black Dimensions (which is the only full-length Dimmu Borgir album featuring Astennu), albeit heavier and less symphonic. The album has an arguably obscure atmosphere because of the atypical cover artwork, the poetic lyrics and the bizarrely edited speech samples between some of the songs. The band again used a drum machine although Nagash is listed as the drummer.

== Track listing ==
All songs composed by Astennu, lyrics written by Ariadne A. Done and Astennu.

No.	Title	Length
1.	"The Abyss's Mystic Haze"	06:07
2.	"Lured Like You Thought"	06:16
3.	"The Painting"	05:05
4.	"Mirrored in Scarry Skies"	05:24
5.	"And Fever"	05:50
6.	"Ludus"	05:42
7.	"Void Dress"	02:45
8.	"Dreaded Chaotic Reign"	02:47
Total length:		39:56

- The song "Lured Like You Thought" is listed as instrumental although it obviously has lyrics provided by Stian Arnesen.
- Track 5 is misspelled "And Forever" on the back cover.

== Personnel ==
- Astennu - guitars, bass, keyboards, drum programming (uncredited)
- Nagash - vocals, drums (credited but didn't play)

=== Additional personnel ===
- Ariadne A. Done - lyrics
- Tommy Tägtgren - mixing
