= Tommie Eriksson =

Swedish musician

Tommie Eriksson (also known as Tommy Eriksson) is a Swedish musician. He founded doom band Saturnalia Temple in 2006.

== Background ==
Eriksson founded the metal band Nocturnal Rites together with Fredrik Mannberg in 1990, though then belonging to the death metal scene. Tommie left Nocturnal Rites in 1994. (From Nocturnal Rites biography)

In 1995 he formed the musical project Shadowseeds, releasing the album The Dream of Lilith through Dark Age Records/Megarock Records. This release belongs to the metal/industrial genre. In 2004, Shadowseeds released a dark ambient CD-R titled Der Mitternacht Löwe, based on the theories of 17th century Swedish mystic Johannes Bureus.

Eriksson played guitar with symphonic metal band Therion in 1995, then took drumming duties in 1996-1997, and again guitar on the albums Vovin in 1998 and Crowning of Atlantis in 1999.

Tommie's drone/ambient project Skopolamin has co-operated with Swedish poet Iodine Jupiter for live shows in 2003 and on his book/DVD in 2005.

In 2012 Tommie co-founded 1970s band The Tower. He is back on the drums in this band.

== Saturnalia Temple ==
Tommie founded doom metal band Saturnalia Temple in 2006. The band played on Hell's Pleasure in 2011, Roadburn Festival in 2012 and Heavy Days in Doomtown in 2013, as well many more gigs around Europe.

=== Discography ===
- UR- 2007 demo, released independently.
- Saturnalia Temple - 2009 EP, released through Nuclear Winter Records.
- On the Powers of the Sphinx - 2010 split with bands Nihil Nocturne, Nightbringer and Aluk Todolo, released through The Ajna Offensive
- Aion of Drakon - 2011 full-length album, released through The Ajna Offensive
- Impossibilium - 2013 EP, released through The Ajna Offensive
- To the Other - 2015 full-length album, released through Listenable Records.
