= Richard Evensand =

Swedish drummer

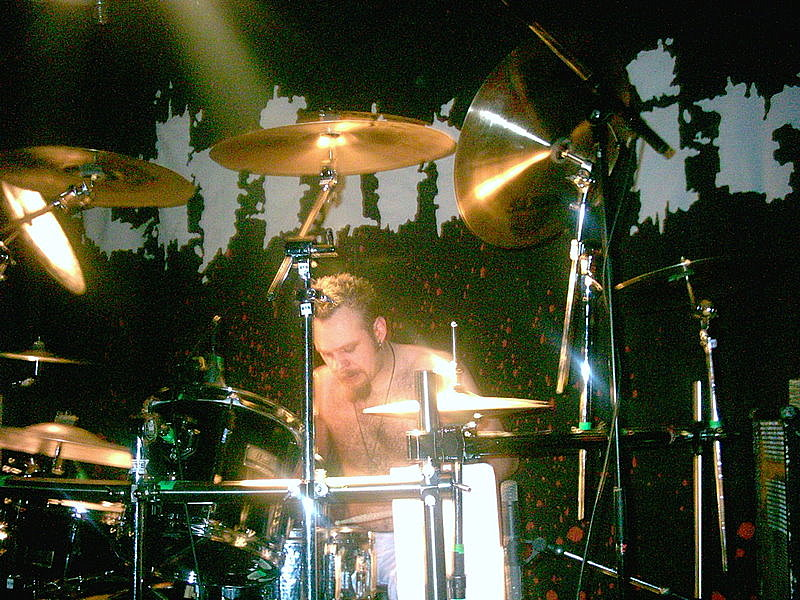
Richard Evensand performing with Chimaira, 2004

Richard "Ricky" Evensand is a Swedish drummer, who has contributed to several extreme metal bands including Therion (2001-2004), Chimaira (2003-2004), Ebony Tears, Sorcerer, Dog Faced Gods, Soilwork, Demonoid, Southpaw, Stardown.

He currently resides in Australia and is the drummer in Gretchen Lewis and Toehider. Ricky performs live regularly as Australian session drummer for Black Majesty as well as a variety of freelance sessions. He recently did a clinic tour of Australia for renowned drum company Mapex.
