= Demonoid (band) =

Swedish extreme metal band

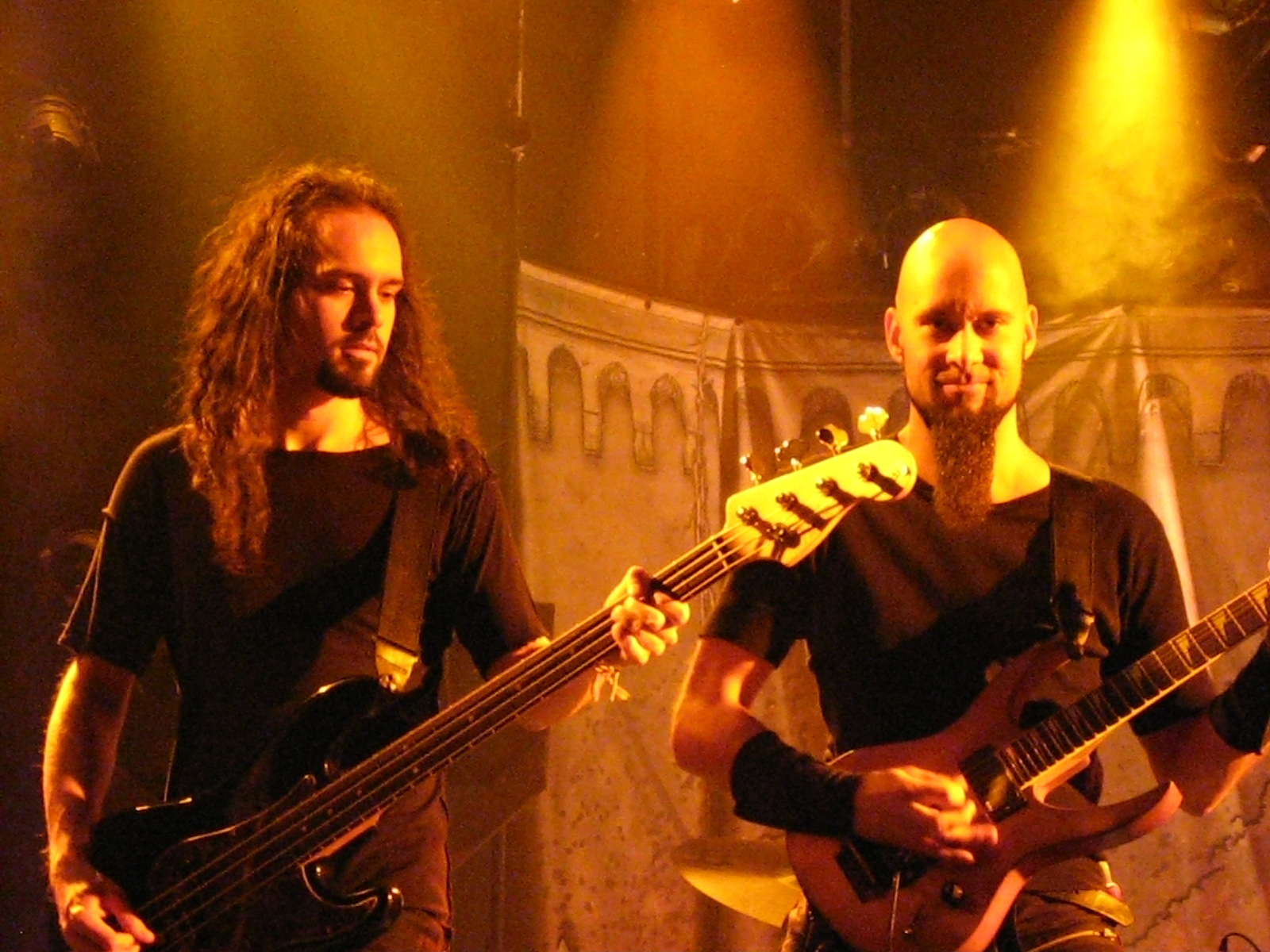
- Johan Niemann and Kristian Niemann playing for Therion at The Fridge in Brixton, 2007

Background information
- Origin: Stockholm, Sweden
- Genre: Extreme metal
- Years active: 2003–present
- Label: Nuclear Blast
- Members: (see below)
- Website: www.demonoid.se

Demonoid is a Swedish extreme metal band founded in 2003 that is influenced by traditional death metal, thrash metal and black metal.

Therion guitarist Kristian Niemann wanted to produce more brutal music. He made earlier attempts with his brother, Johan Niemann, although none that appeared on any records. Fellow Therion member Christofer Johnsson later joined the project with Rickard Evensand, who was drumming with Therion at that time.

== History ==
So far, they have released one album, Riders of the Apocalypse, in 2004. The album is about the Four Horsemen of the Apocalypse. Johnsson never intended to tour and joined as a session vocalist for the recording of the first album. With two other members busy touring with Therion, Demonoid never played any concerts.

On March 25, 2006, it was officially announced that Johnsson had withdrawn from Demonoid and that an unannounced replacement vocalist had been found. On October 7, 2007, the new singer was revealed to be Emperor Magus Caligula of Dark Funeral, and on the same day the new band website was launched. Since then, the band opened a forum in which Kristian keeps fans up to date, leaving the website without updates since January 16, 2008.

On July 22, 2007, the band announced that a second album was being written with Kristian Niemann as the main creative force. As of November, 2008 all bass, drums, and rhythm guitars had been recorded. The album was to be released some time in 2009, but it is now stated to be delayed without a new release date.

In 2011, Emperor Magus Caligula joined Witchery, and left in 2012.

== Band members ==
- Kristian Niemann - guitar (2003–present)
- Johan Niemann - bass (2003–present
- Richard Evensand - drums (2003–present)
- Mario Santos-Ramos - vocals (2012–present)

== Former members ==
- Christofer Johnsson - vocals - (2003-2006)
- Emperor Magus Caligula - vocals - (2007-2012)

== Discography ==
- Riders of the Apocalypse (2004), Nuclear Blast
