= Crowning of Atlantis =

Studio album by Therion
- Released: 7 June 1999
- Recorded: 1997–1999
- Genre: Symphonic metal
- Length: 50:42
- Label: Nuclear Blast; NB 0398
- Producer: Siegfried Bemm

Therion chronology
Vovin (1998)	Crowning of Atlantis (1999)	Deggial (2000)

Professional ratings
Review scores
Source	Rating
AllMusic	2.5/5 stars

Crowning of Atlantis is the eighth studio album by Swedish symphonic metal band Therion. In the beginning it was an EP fleshed out with several covers and live tracks from Vovin Tour '98 that the record label and management insisted be placed on it to make it a full-length album.

== Track listing ==
No.	Title	Length
1.	"The Crowning of Atlantis"	4:58
2.	"Mark of Cain"	5:01
3.	"Clavicula Nox" (Remix)	8:52
4.	"Crazy Nights" (Loudness cover)	3:43
5.	"From the Dionysian Days"	3:16
6.	"Thor (The Powerhead)" (Manowar cover)	4:47
7.	"Seawinds" (Accept cover)	4:23
8.	"To Mega Therion" (Live)	6:39
9.	"The Wings of the Hydra" (Live)	3:22
10.	"Black Sun" (Live)	5:46
Total length:		50:42

== Credits ==
- Christofer Johnsson – lead and rhythm guitar, keyboards, choir/vocal melodies, classic orchestra arrangements,
- Tommie Eriksson – lead and rhythm guitar
- Jan Kazda – bass and acoustic guitar, additional arrangements, choir and orchestra conducting
- Wolf Simon – drums (except "Crowning of Atlantis")
- Sami Karppinen – drums ("Crowning of Atlantis")
- Waldemar Sorychta – additional guitars, solo on "Crowning of Atlantis", "Seawinds" and second solo on "Crazy Nights"

=== Guest musicians ===
- Ralf Scheepers – vocals on "Crazy Nights" and "Thor"
- Eileen Küpper – vocals on "Mark of Cain"
- Cossima Russo – vocals on "Mark of Cain"
- Angelica Märtz – vocals on "Mark of Cain"
- Martina Hornbacher – vocals on "Seawinds"
- Sarah Jezebel Deva – vocals on "Seawinds" and ending vocal line on "Clavicula Nox"
- Jochen Bauer – solo bass vocals on "Clavicula Nox"
- Jörg Braüker – solo tenor, vocals on "Clavicula Nox"

=== Choir ===
- Eileen Küpper – soprano
- Angelike Maertz – soprano
- Anne Tributh – alto
- Joerg Braeuker – bass
- Jochen Bauer – bass

=== Indigo orchestra ===
Orchestration was made by Indigo Orchestra:

- Heike Haushalter – violin
- Petra Stalz – violin
- Monika Maltek – viola
- Gesa Hangen – cello

=== Vovin Tour '98 line-up ===
- Christofer Johnsson – guitar & vocals
- Tommy Eriksson – guitar
- Kim Blomkvist – bass
- Sami Karppinen – drums
- Sarah Jezebel Deva – vocals
- Martina Hornbacher – vocals
- Cinthia Acosta Vera – vocals

== Cover design ==
Artwork was made by Nico & Theresa.

== Charts ==
Chart (1999)	Peak position
German Albums (Offizielle Top 100)	87
