= Carpe Tenebrum =

Australian black metal solo project

- Origin: Oslo, Norway
- Genres: Black metal, symphonic black metal, blackened death metal
- Years active: 1997–?
- Labels: Head Not Found; Hammerheart
- Past members: Nagash; Astennu

Carpe Tenebrum (incorrectly, "Seize the Darkness" in Latin) was a black metal solo project of the former Dimmu Borgir and Covenant guitarist Jamie Stinson, better known as Astennu. Stian Arnesen (Nagash) was also involved with the project. Very little has been heard of the project since the release of the third album, Dreaded Chaotic Reign, in 2002.

== Members ==
- Jamie "Astennu" Stinson – guitars, bass, keyboards, drum machine programming, vocals on Dreaded Chaotic Reign)
- Stian "Nagash" Arnesen – vocals on the first two albums

== Discography ==
- Majestic Nothingness LP (1997, Head Not Found)
- Mirrored Hate Painting LP (1999, Hammerheart Records)
- Dreaded Chaotic Reign LP (2002, Hammerheart Records)
