= Stian Hinderson =

Norwegian musician

- Also known as: Lex Icon; Nagash; Nagash Blackheart
- Born: Stian André Arnesen; 7 May 1978 (age 47)
- Origin: Norway
- Genres: Heavy metal, black metal, industrial metal, symphonic black metal
- Occupations: Musician, songwriter
- Instruments: Vocals, guitar, bass, drums, keyboards
- Member of: The Kovenant, Troll
- Formerly of: Dimmu Borgir, Carpe Tenebrum, Chrome Division, Kvesta

Stian André Hinderson (born Stian André Arnesen, 7 May 1978), also known under the stage names Nagash and Lex Icon, is a Norwegian metal musician. He plays guitar, bass, drums, keyboards and does vocals. He is primarily known for his work with the black metal bands Dimmu Borgir and The Kovenant.

== Biography ==
Nagash began writing music in 1992, together with Fafnir and Glaurung for a project called Troll. Fafnir and Glaurung soon left the band, but Nagash continued Troll as a solo project, playing guitar and keyboard. Wanting to be in a band and "express himself on all levels", he founded the band Covenant together with Amund Svensson in 1993. (However, after having released two albums, they had to change the name to The Kovenant due to a Swedish band already called Covenant).

Gaining a good reputation in the black metal scene, Nagash was recruited as bass player for Dimmu Borgir in 1996. In 1999, he left Dimmu Borgir to concentrate on his career with The Kovenant. At the same time, he changed his stage name to Lex Icon in order to reflect the artistic direction The Kovenant had taken.

In 2004, now known as Lex Icon, he teamed up with Shagrath and formed a new heavy metal band called Chrome Division. In this band he played drums.

Lex had to leave Chrome Division, after which he dedicated himself 100% on working on the next The Kovenant album. He also joined one of his favorite bands, Crowhead.

He has also been involved in Nocturnal Breed (as a session drummer, under the name of Rick Hellraiser), and Carpe Tenebrum.

From the beginning of 2008, he recruited a full lineup for his former solo project, Troll. Their latest album Neo-Satanic Supremacy has been released in early 2010 through Napalm Records.

For a short while in 2015–2016, Nagash was a member of Norwegian black/thrash metal band Kvesta.

== Discography ==
Dimmu Borgir

- Devil's Path (EP) (1996)
- Enthrone Darkness Triumphant (1997)
- Godless Savage Garden (1998)
- Spiritual Black Dimensions (1999)

The Kovenant

- From the Storm of Shadows (Demo) (1994)
- Promo 1995 (Demo) (1995)
- In Times Before the Light (1997)
- Nexus Polaris (1998)
- Animatronic (1999)
- SETI 4-Track Club EP (2003)
- SETI (2003)

Troll

- Trollstorm over Nidingjuv (Demo) (1995)
- Drep de Kristne (1996)
- The Last Predators (2000)
- Universal (2001)
- Neo-Satanic Supremacy (2010)
- Tilbake til Trollberg (EP) (2020)
- To the Shadows (Single) (2023)
- Trolldom (2023)

Carpe Tenebrum

- Majestic Nothingness (1997)
- Mirrored Hate Painting (1999)

Kvesta

- Human Scum (EP) (2015)
- Dismember (Single) (2016)

== Sources ==
- Interview with Lex Icon by MetalKings.com
