= Johan Niemann =

Swedish bassist (born 1977)

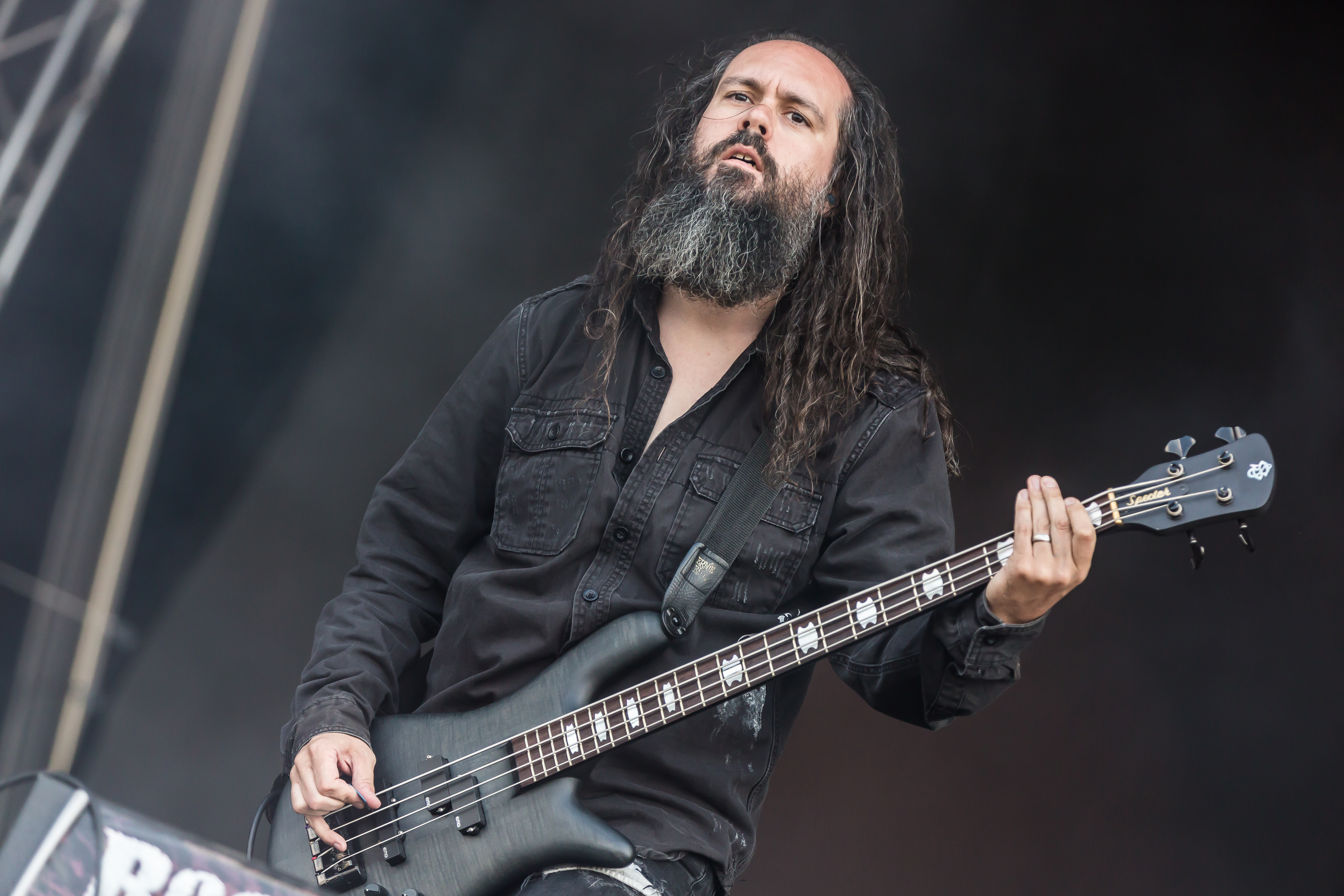
- Niemann performing with Evergrey in 2018

Background information
- Born: Johan Wilhelm Niemann; 26 June 1977 (age 48)
- Genres: Heavy metal, symphonic metal, death metal, thrash metal, black metal, extreme metal, progressive metal
- Occupation: Musician
- Instruments: Bass, guitar
- Years active: 2000–present

Johan Wilhelm Niemann (born 26 June 1977) is a Swedish musician best known as the current bassist of Evergrey and for co-founding the band Mind's Eye. He was also a member of Swedish symphonic metal band Therion and Scandinavian metal band Evil Masquerade, among others. He is the brother of Kristian Niemann.

== Bands ==
Niemann is/was a member of the following bands:

- Evergrey
- Mind's Eye
- Therion
- Evil Masquerade
- Demonoid
- Afterglow
- Chris Catena
- Hubi Meisel
- Frasse Haraldsen
- Lithium
- Moonstone
- Novak
- Tears of Anger
- The Murder of My Sweet
