= Head Not Found =

Norwegian record label

Head Not Found is a Norwegian record label, a sublabel of Voices Music & Entertainment, specializing in various heavy metal subgenres. They describe the genres as black, death, doom, thrash, gothic, viking metal and ambient. Their parent label is Voices of Wonder. Head Not Found was founded in 1992 and its offices are in Oslo.

The original founder was the Norwegian zine editor Jon "Metalion" Kristiansen.

== Artists ==
The following artists released albums through Head Not Found:

- Alastis
- Atrox
- Carpe Tenebrum
- Enslavement of Beauty
- Gehenna
- Merciless
- Pazuzu
- Ragnarok
- The Kovenant
- The 3rd and the Mortal
- Trelldom
- Troll
- Twin Obscenity
- Ulver
- Valhall
- Windir
