= Kristian Niemann =

Swedish guitarist (born 1971)

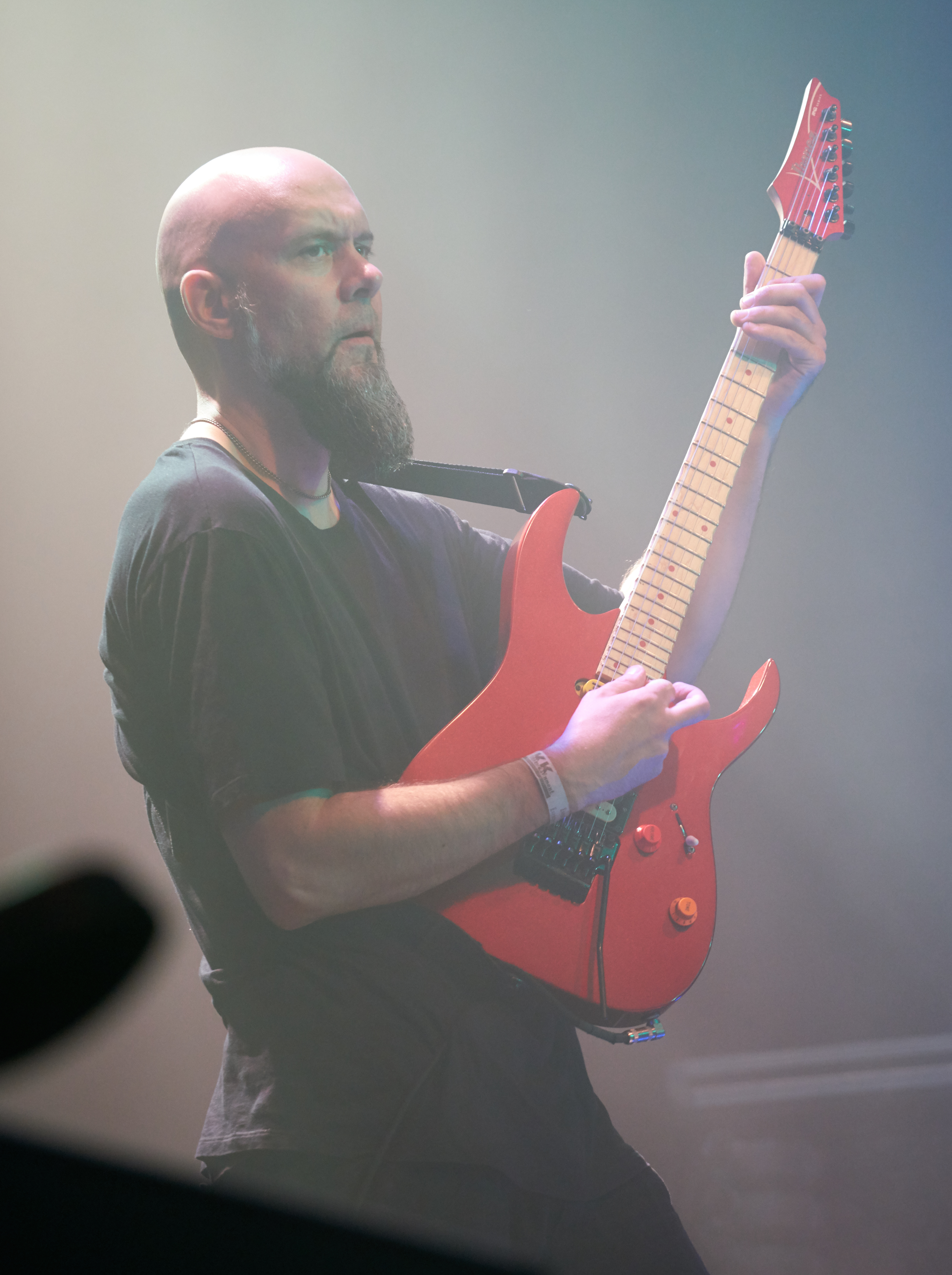
- Niemann performing in 2015

Background information
- Born: 26 October 1971 (age 53)
- Genres: Heavy metal, symphonic metal, death metal, thrash metal, black metal, extreme metal
- Occupation: Guitarist
- Years active: 1996–present

Kristian Niemann (born 26 October 1971) is a Swedish guitarist who currently plays for heavy metal band Sorcerer and has previously performed for bands such as Therion, Lithium, and Demonoid. He is the brother of Johan Niemann.
