= Sorcerer (band) =

Swedish heavy metal band

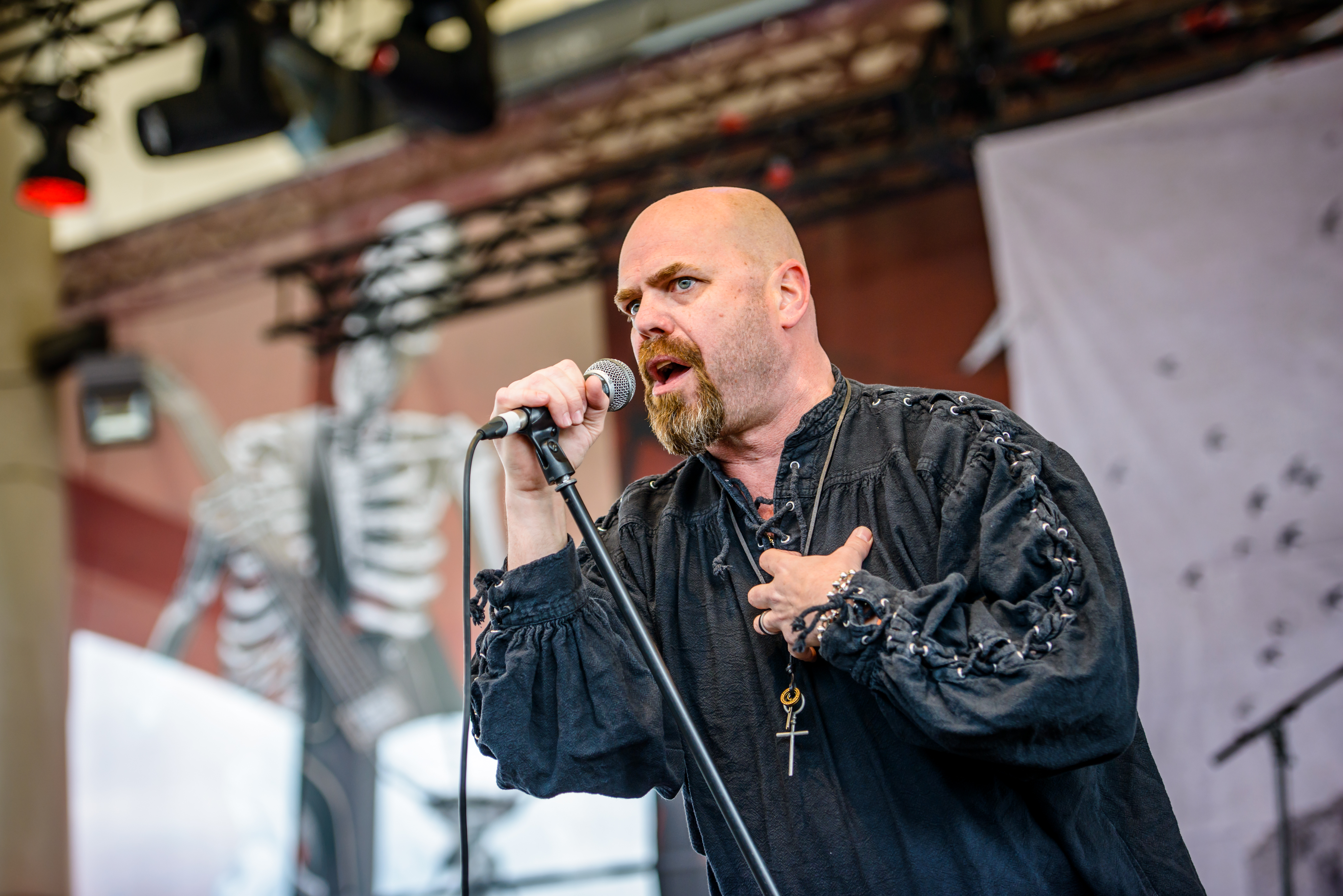
- Vocalist Anders Engberg in 2016

Background information
- Origin: Stockholm, Sweden
- Genres: Epic doom metal, heavy metal
- Years active: 1988–1992; 2010–present
- Label: Metal Blade Records
- Members: Anders Engberg; Kristian Niemann; Peter Hallgren; Justin Biggs; Richard Evensand
- Past members: Johnny Hagel; Peter Furulid; Mats Liedholm; Ola Englund; Robert Iversen; Tommy Karlsson
- Website: sorcererdoom.com

Sorcerer is a Swedish epic doom metal band from Stockholm that was founded in 1988, disbanded in 1992 and re-formed in 2010.

== History ==
The original 1988 band consisted of bassist Johnny Hagel, drummer Tommy Karlsson and guitarist Peter Furulid. In 1989, singer Anders Engberg (Lion's Share) and a second guitarist, Mats Liedholm, joined the band. In the same year, the group recorded their first demo Anno 1503, of which 1,500 copies were sold, and the band played two gigs in Stockholm, the first with Count Raven and the second at a festival with other bands, including Entombed, Carnage, Therion and Mezzrow, all of which were playing their first show. In the same year the sampler Rockbox was published, including "Born with Fire". In 1990 Richard Evensand joined Sorcerer as new drummer. In 1992 Sorcerer recorded their second demo, The Inquisition, which included a demo version of the Rainbow song "Stargazer". Later that year, Hagel left the band to join Tiamat. Shortly thereafter, the band disbanded. According to Hagel, his departure was not the reason for the band's dissolution, but the lack of motivation and lack of time of the remaining band members. In 1995, John Perez of Solitude Aeturnus released both demos as a compilation on his label Brainticket Records, Brainticket's first release. Perez and Hail had known each other since the first Sorcerer demo.

In 2010, Oliver Weinsheimer offered the band a slot at the German Hammer of Doom Festival. Sorcerer consisted of Hagel and Engberg and friends of the two. Kristian Niemann and Ola Englund played electric guitar and Robert Iversen the drums. In 2011, Perez re-released the remastered demos. As a bonus, three previously unreleased songs, "Wisdom", "Northern Seas" and "At Dawn", were included. The same year, the band played at the Up the Hammers Festival in Athens, and work began on the debut album. In 2012, Englund left the band to join Six Feet Under; Peter Hallgren joined as a replacement. In the following years, the band continued to work on the album, then the recorded –material was mixed and mastered by drummer Robert Iversen. The album was mastered by Jens Bogren and released in 2015 under the name In the Shadow of the Inverted Cross on Metal Blade Records.

In 2016, during the recording of the next studio album Iversen left the band and Lars Sköld filled the role as session drummer on the album. The second album, The Crowning of the Fire King was published via Metal Blade in 2017, and was chosen as "album of the month" in the German Rock Hard magazine.

In 2018 Hagel decided to take a step back as an active bandmember, although he would stay involved with the band and in songwriting. Hagel replaced by Justin Biggs.

In the beginning of 2020 the band recorded their third studio album, which released in May 2020 with the title Lamenting of the Innocent.

In August 2022, Sorcerer performed their first ever UK show at Bloodstock Festival.

== Musical style ==
According to Nadine Fiebig in Nuclear Blast magazine, In the Shadow of the Inverted Cross had some parallels to bands like King Diamond, combined with a "haunting voice" and "grave sounding guitars". In the book The Ultimate Hard Rock Guide Vol I – Europe, Sorcerer's music is described as epic doom in the style of Solitude Aeturnus. Janne Stark compared the band with Candlemass and Solitude Aeturnus in his book The Heaviest Encyclopedia of Swedish Hard Rock and Heavy Metal Ever!, but referred to the music as progressive doom metal.

In an interview with Rock Hard magazine's Patrick Schmidt, Johnny Hagel stated that besides Solitude Aeturnus, Candlemass, Saint Vitus and Black Sabbath, traditional heavy metal is one of the band's influences. In the same issue, Boris Kaiser stated, in his review of the album, that the basis of the songs was classical doom metal, with additional influences from hard rock and heavy metal, referring to Rainbow; he also mentioned Scandinavian melodic and power metal like Memory Garden and Memento Mori as another reference. Sorcerer would also cite Black Sabbath at the time of Headless Cross. Frank Albrecht of the Deaf Forever magazine describes the music as epic doom for Candlemass and Solitude Aeturnus worshippers, but not a dull copy, but emphasizing their own features.

== Personnel ==
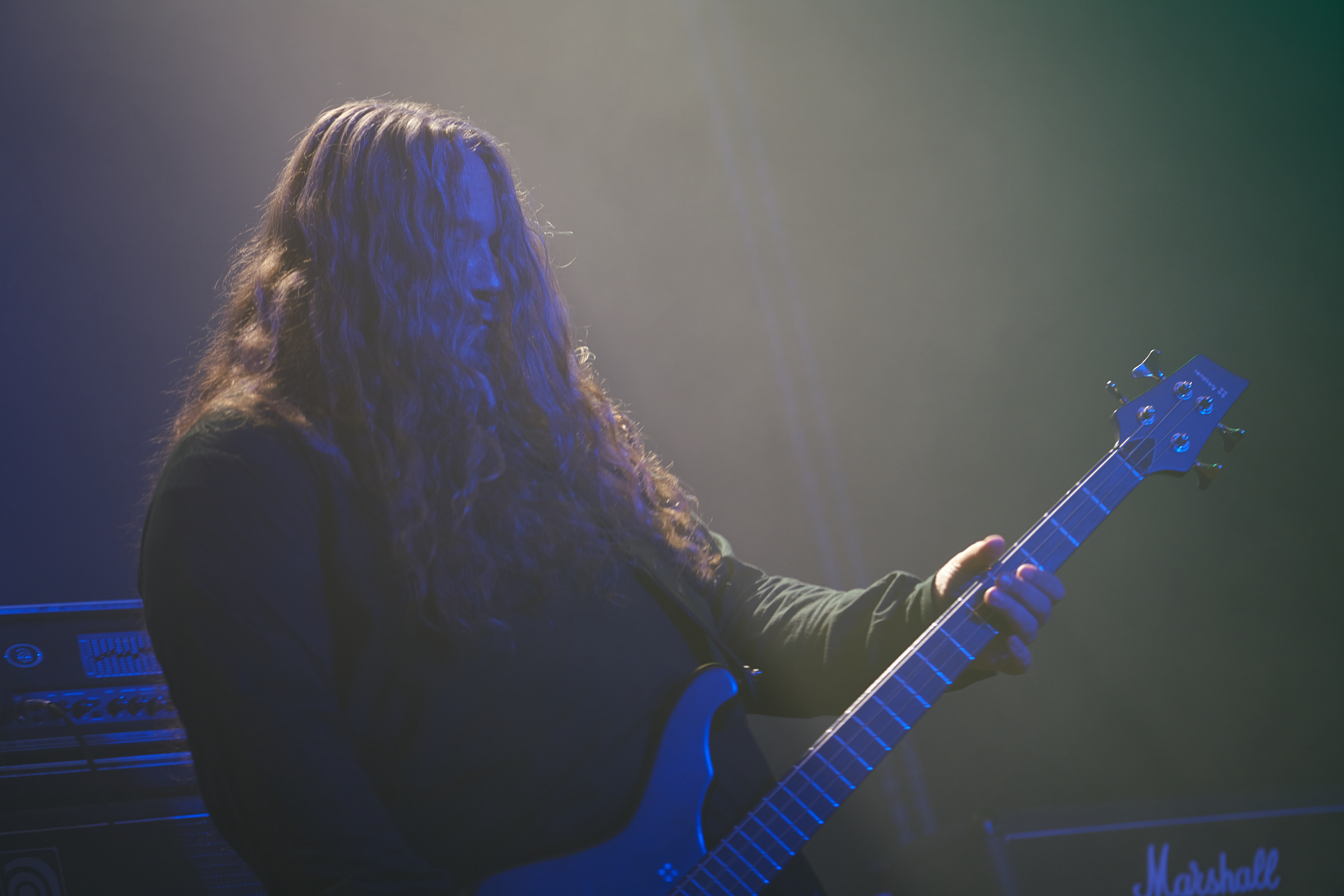
Former bassist Johnny Hagel

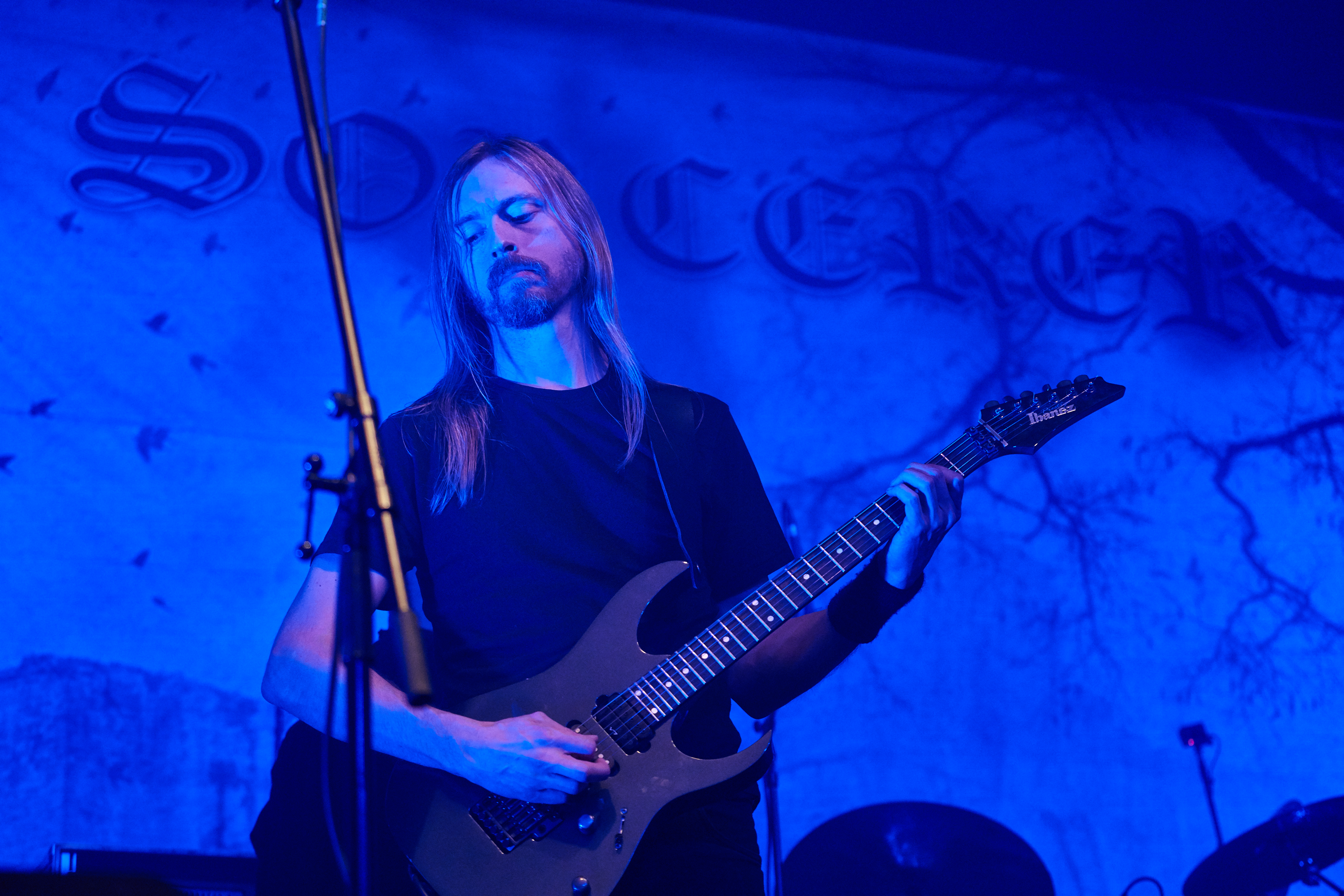
Guitarist Peter Hallgren

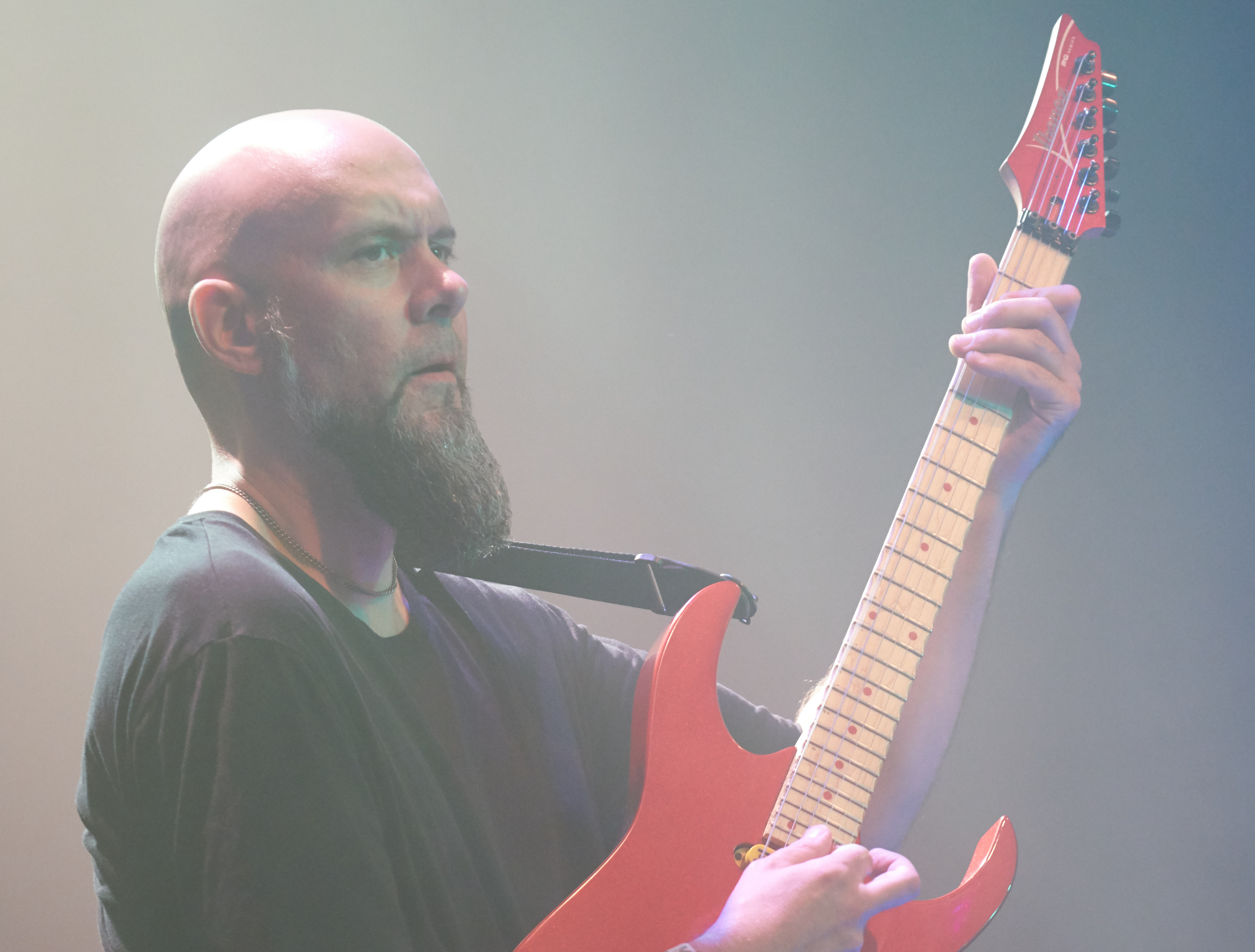
Guitarist Kristian Niemann

=== Members ===
Current members

- Anders Engberg – vocals (1988–1992, 2010–present)
- Kristian Niemann – guitars (2010–present)
- Peter Hallgren – guitars (2012–present)
- Justin Biggs – bass (2018–present)
- Stefan Norgren – drums (2023–present)

Former members

- Johnny Hagel – bass (1988–1992, 2010–2018)
- Peter Furulid – guitars (1988–1992)
- Mats Liedholm – guitars (1988–1992)
- Tommy Karlsson – drums (1988–1990)
- Richard Evensand – drums (1990–1992, 2017–2023)
- Robert Iversen – drums (2010–2017)
- Ola Englund – guitars (2010–2012)

Live/session member

- Lars Sköld – drums (2016)

== Discography ==
Studio albums

- In the Shadow of the Inverted Cross (2015)
- The Crowning of the Fire King (2017)
- Lamenting of the Innocent (2020) GER #18; SWE #30; SWI 31; AUS #72
- Reign of the Reaper (2023) GER #23; SWE #42

EPs

- Black (2015)
- The Quarantine Sessions (2020)
- Reverence (2021)

Demos

- Anno 1503 (1989)
- The Inquisition (1992)
