= Amund Svensson =

Norwegian musician (born 1978)

- Also known as: Pzy Clone, Psy Coma, Thanatos Blackheart
- Born: Amund Svensson
- Origin: Norway
- Genres: Industrial metal, black metal, symphonic black metal, electronica
- Occupations: Musician, songwriter
- Instruments: Guitar, keyboards, synthesizer, drum programming
- Years active: 1991–present

Amund Svensson (born 21 April 1978) is a Norwegian musician and composer.

He is the co-founder and the main composer of the band The Kovenant, for which he plays guitars and keyboards as well as write orchestrations. He is also involved in his own long abandoned side project Painstation, and has created remixes and orchestrations for Theatre of Tragedy, Mortiis and Deathstars.
