= Bloodbath over Bloodstock =

Video by Bloodbath
- Released: 25 April 2011
- Recorded: August 2010
- Genre: Death metal
- Length: 68:04
- Label: Peaceville
- Producer: The Dark Box

Bloodbath chronology
The Fathomless Mastery (2008)	Bloodbath over Bloodstock (2011)	Grand Morbid Funeral (2014)

Bloodbath over Bloodstock is a live DVD by Swedish death metal band Bloodbath. It features the entire live set the band played at Bloodstock Open Air in August 2010. It was filmed by the production company The Dark Box. It was released on 25 April 2011, by Peaceville Records. This is the final release with Mikael Åkerfeldt in the band as he quit in 2012.

== Track listing ==
Bloodstock (August 2010)
No.	Title	Album	Length
1.	"Ways to the Grave"	Resurrection Through Carnage	3:28
2.	"Soul Evisceration"	Nightmares Made Flesh	3:36
3.	"Process of Disillumination"	The Fathomless Mastery	3:08
4.	"Iesous"	The Fathomless Mastery	3:31
5.	"Breeding Death"	Breeding Death	4:29
6.	"Mouth of Empty Praise"	Unblessing the Purity	3:29
7.	"Mass Strangulation"	Resurrection Through Carnage	3:34
8.	"Cancer of the Soul"	Nightmares Made Flesh	3:23
9.	"Mock the Cross"	The Fathomless Mastery	3:01
10.	"Like Fire"	Resurrection Through Carnage	4:24
11.	"Outnumbering the Day"	Nightmares Made Flesh	3:17
12.	"Eaten"	Nightmares Made Flesh	4:10

Music video
No.	Title	Album	Length
13.	"Hades Rising"	The Fathomless Mastery	5:18

Party.San Open Air (2008)
No.	Title	Album	Length
14.	"Blasting the Virginborn"	Unblessing the Purity	3:26
15.	"Bathe in Blood"	Resurrection Through Carnage	4:11
16.	"Weak Aside"	Unblessing the Purity	3:43
17.	"So You Die"	Resurrection Through Carnage	3:17
18.	"Cry My Name"	Resurrection Through Carnage	4:39

Other material
No.	Title	Length
19.	"The Interview" (Recorded in Stockholm, Sweden)

== Reception ==
The DVD placed No. 3 in Finland and No. 9 in Sweden on the "Music DVD" chart.

== Personnel ==
- Mikael Åkerfeldt – vocals
- Martin "Axe" Axenrot – drums
- Anders "Blakkheim" Nyström – guitar
- Jonas Renkse – bass
- Per "Sodomizer" Eriksson – guitar
- Travis Smith – album cover
