= The Wacken Carnage =

Live album by Bloodbath
- Released: 2 June 2008
- Recorded: 5 August 2005
- Genre: Death metal
- Length: 52:55
- Label: Peaceville

Bloodbath chronology
Unblessing the Purity (2008)	The Wacken Carnage (2008)	The Fathomless Mastery (2008)

The Wacken Carnage is a CD/DVD set of death metal band Bloodbath at a very rare live appearance recorded on 5 August 2005 at the Wacken Open Air Festival in Germany. At that time, this live appearance was presented as the only Bloodbath show there would ever be, but Bloodbath has since headlined Party.San Metal Open Air in Germany on 8 August 2008, Pellavarock in Finland on 9 August 2008, and Hellfest in France on 22 June 2010 and Bloodstock Open Air in England on 15 August 2010, as well as toured North America and Europe in 2018 and 2019.

== Track listing ==
All tracks are written by Bloodbath.

No.	Title	Album	Length
1.	"Intro"	The Wacken Carnage	0:24
2.	"Cancer of the Soul"	Nightmares Made Flesh	3:49
3.	"So You Die"	Resurrection Through Carnage	4:28
4.	"Soul Evisceration"	Nightmares Made Flesh	4:03
5.	"Ways to the Grave"	Resurrection Through Carnage	3:54
6.	"Ominous Bloodvomit"	Breeding Death	4:36
7.	"Like Fire"	Resurrection Through Carnage	5:01
8.	"Bastard Son of God"	Nightmares Made Flesh	3:09
9.	"Breeding Death"	Breeding Death	5:12
10.	"Outnumbering the Day"	Nightmares Made Flesh	4:05
11.	"Brave New Hell"	Nightmares Made Flesh	4:35
12.	"Furnace Funeral"	Breeding Death	5:19
13.	"Eaten"	Nightmares Made Flesh	4:20
Total length:			52:55

== Personnel ==
- Mikael Åkerfeldt – vocals
- Anders "Blakkheim" Nyström – guitar, backing vocals
- Jonas Renkse – bass
- Dan Swanö – guitar, backing vocals
- Martin "Axe" Axenrot – drums
