= Bloodbath =

Swedish death metal supergroup

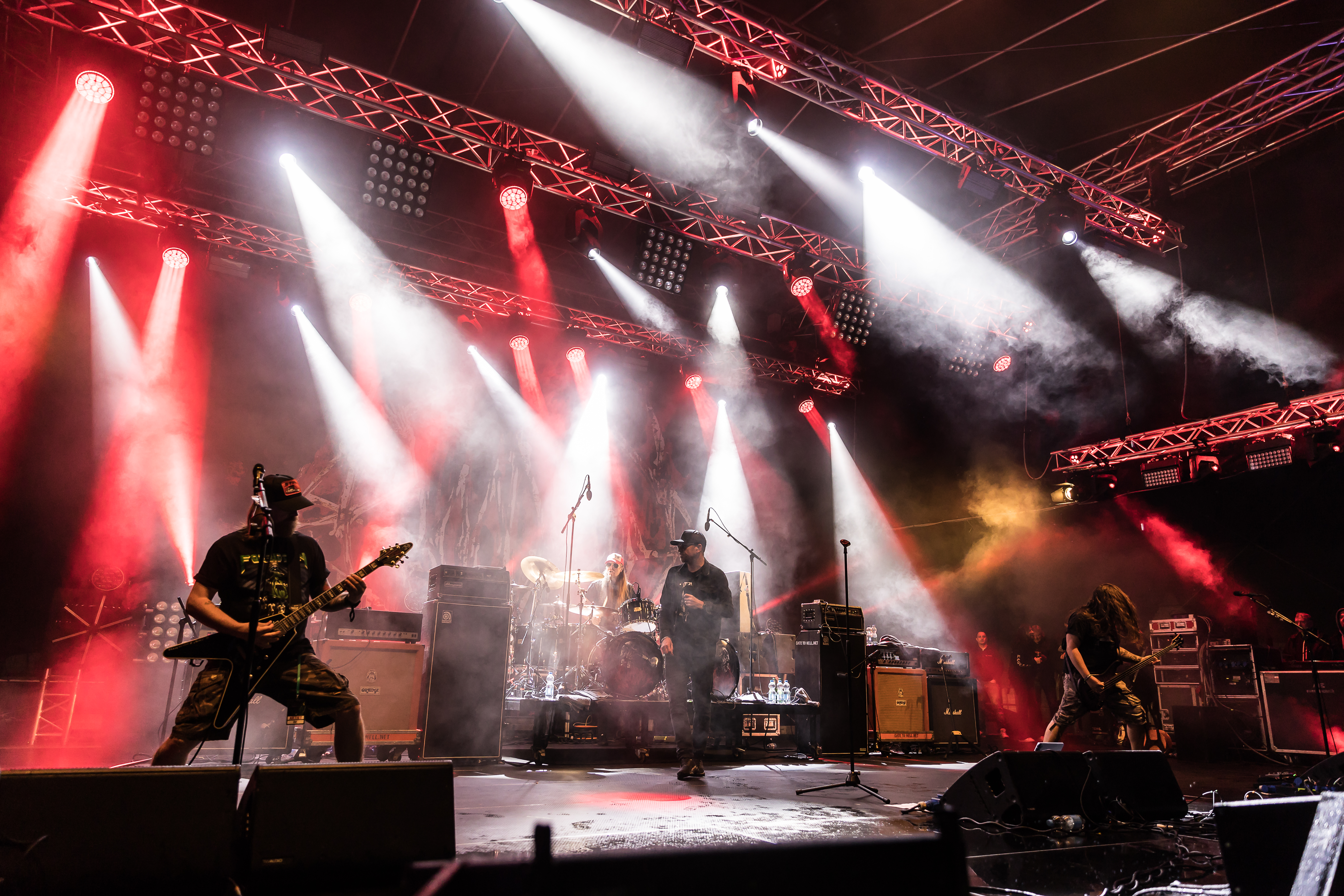
- Bloodbath at Metal Frenzy Open Air 2026

Background information
- Origin: Stockholm, Sweden
- Genres: Death metal; blackened death metal
- Years active: 1998–present
- Labels: Peaceville; Century Media; Napalm
- Members: Anders Nyström; Martin Axenrot; Nick Holmes
- Past members: Jonas Renkse; Mikael Åkerfeldt; Dan Swanö; Per Eriksson; Peter Tägtgren; Joakim Karlsson; Tomas Åkvik
- Website: www.bloodbath.biz

Bloodbath is a Swedish death metal supergroup from Stockholm, formed in 1998. The band has released six full-length albums, two EPs, and two DVDs depicting their performances at Wacken Open Air (in 2005) and Bloodstock Open Air (in 2010). The group consists of Martin Axenrot (ex-Opeth), Anders Nyström (ex-Katatonia) and Nick Holmes (Paradise Lost).

== History ==
The band named themselves after the song "Blood Bath" from the album To the Gory End by extreme metal band Cancer. The initial lineup consisted of Mikael Åkerfeldt (Opeth) on vocals, Dan Swanö (Edge of Sanity, Nightingale) on drums, Anders "Blakkheim" Nyström (Katatonia, Diabolical Masquerade) on guitar, and Jonas Renkse (Katatonia, October Tide) on bass. Bloodbath released the EP Breeding Death within a year of forming. The EP was written within two days of the band forming. Nyström said, "that just shows that if you are with a like-minded bunch of people who all have their history within death metal, all are capable with their instruments, then of course you can knock out professional death metal in no time at all." The band's debut EP was followed two years later by their debut album, Resurrection Through Carnage.

In 2004, Åkerfeldt left Bloodbath, wanting to free up more time for his primary band, Opeth, with Peter Tägtgren (Hypocrisy) brought in to replace him. The lineup changed further, with Swanö switching to guitar and Martin Axenrot (Witchery, Satanic Slaughter, Opeth) filling the position of drummer. These changes increased the size and scope of the band, expanding beyond a secondary side project. The band's second full release, Nightmares Made Flesh, was released in Europe in September 2004.

In February 2005, Tägtgren left the band citing "conflicting schedules". That same year, Åkerfeldt rejoined for a live show at Germany's Wacken Open Air on 5 August. The band was quoted as saying, prior to the show, that it would be "Not only the first, but also the last gig for Bloodbath (with Mikael Åkerfeldt on vocals)". It would later turn out to also be the last show with Swanö. In September 2005, Bloodbath began searching for a lead singer.

In August 2006, the band announced Swanö's departure due to musical differences and Swanö being busy with other projects. They closed the vocal auditions, announcing that no suitable singer had been found.

On 27 March 2007, the band announced that a new line-up would be unveiled, along with news that they were producing new material to be released that summer. In August 2007, Renkse posted on the band's official forums, suggesting that work was in progress. On 30 January 2008, it was announced via the Bloodbath website that Åkerfeldt would rejoin the line-up on vocals, along with new member Per Eriksson (ex-21 Lucifers, ex-Genocrush Ferox) on guitar. In March 2008, the EP Unblessing the Purity was released. Also released in 2008 was the Wacken live CD/DVD The Wacken Carnage. Bloodbath released their third full-length album, The Fathomless Mastery, in October 2008.

On 25 April 2011, Bloodbath released their second DVD, Bloodbath over Bloodstock, containing their performance at Bloodstock Festival 2010 and the 2008 performance at Party San. On 1 November 2011, during the final show of the American Opeth/Katatonia tour at Rams Head Live! in Baltimore, Maryland, Bloodbath performed a surprise encore after Opeth's set.

On 14 April 2012, Blakkheim announced that Åkerfeldt had officially left the group. When asked whether the new vocalist was known or not, Blakkheim was quoted saying "Oh, he's a legend!". On 16 September 2014, the band announced the new vocalist as Nick Holmes from Paradise Lost.

On 12 April 2025, Blakkheim announced that Renkse had left Bloodbath in 2023.

== Artistry ==
Guitarist Anders "Blakkheim" Nyström explained the band's composition process: "There has always been a lot of spontaneity with Bloodbath. The whole project was formed over two days, while we also recorded our first EP [Breeding Death] in that time. [...] We like things to be rapid; it keeps the magic going. If you just sit there and drag things out, you are going to lose interest in everything and you're not going to maintain that kick-ass vibe. Knock it out fast and no regrets." The band uses the Boss HM-2 to achieve its guitar tone.

== Members ==
=== Current members ===
- Anders "Blakkheim" Nyström – guitars, backing vocals (1998–present)
- Martin "Axe" Axenrot – drums, percussion (2004–present)
- Nick "Old Nick" Holmes – lead vocals (2012–present)

== Gallery ==
Band members at Metal Frenzy open air 2026

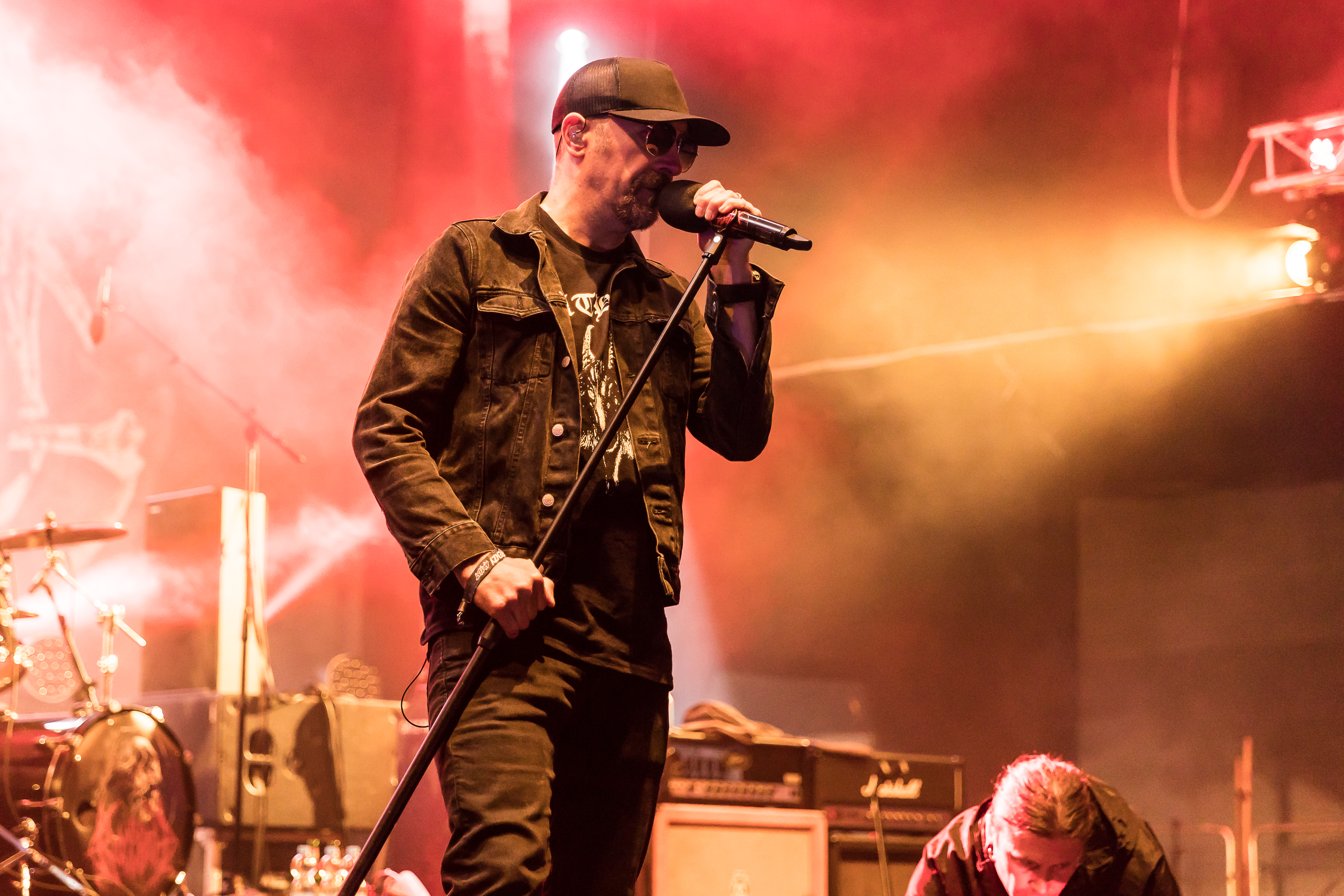
Nick Holmes, vocals

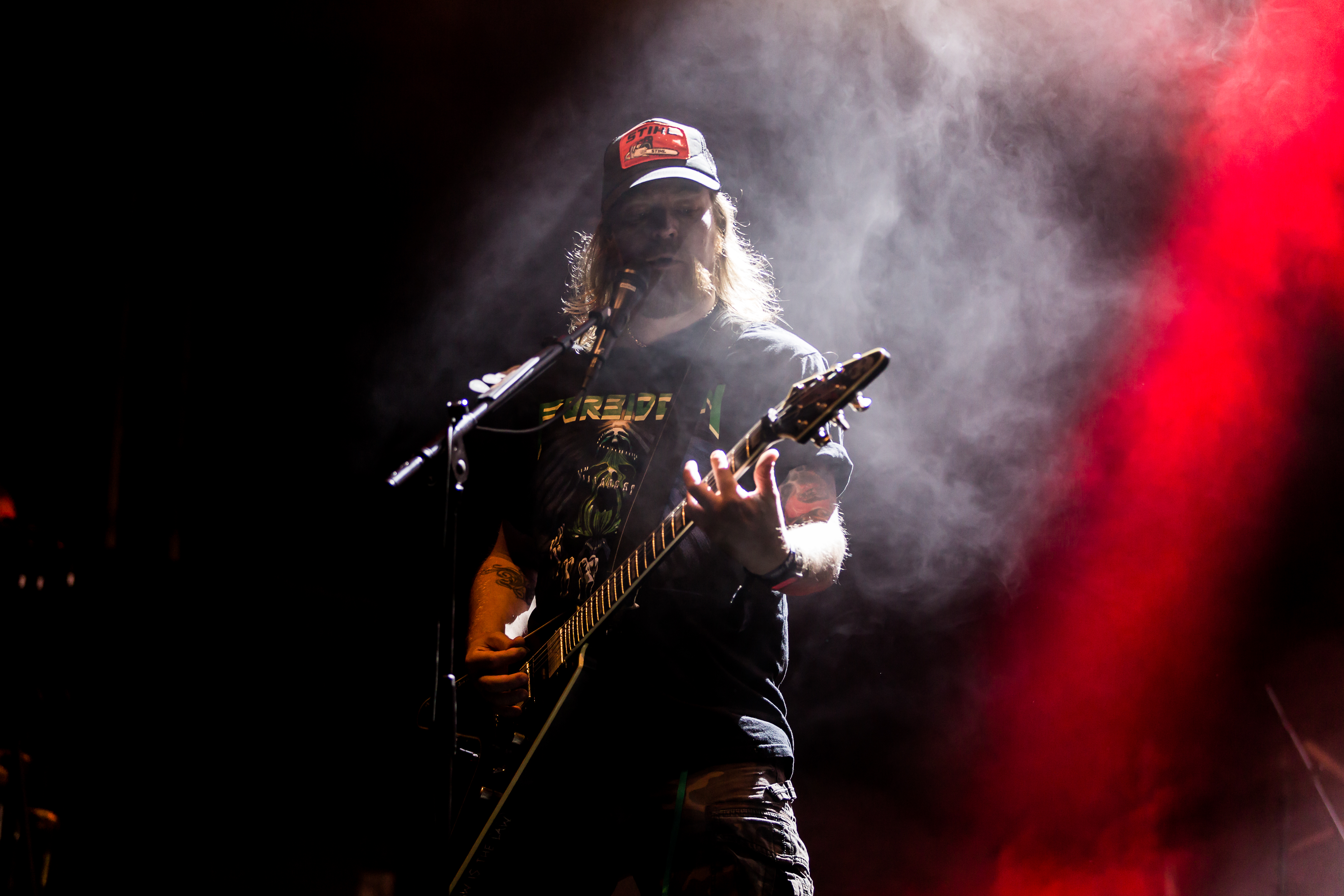
Anders Nyström, guitars

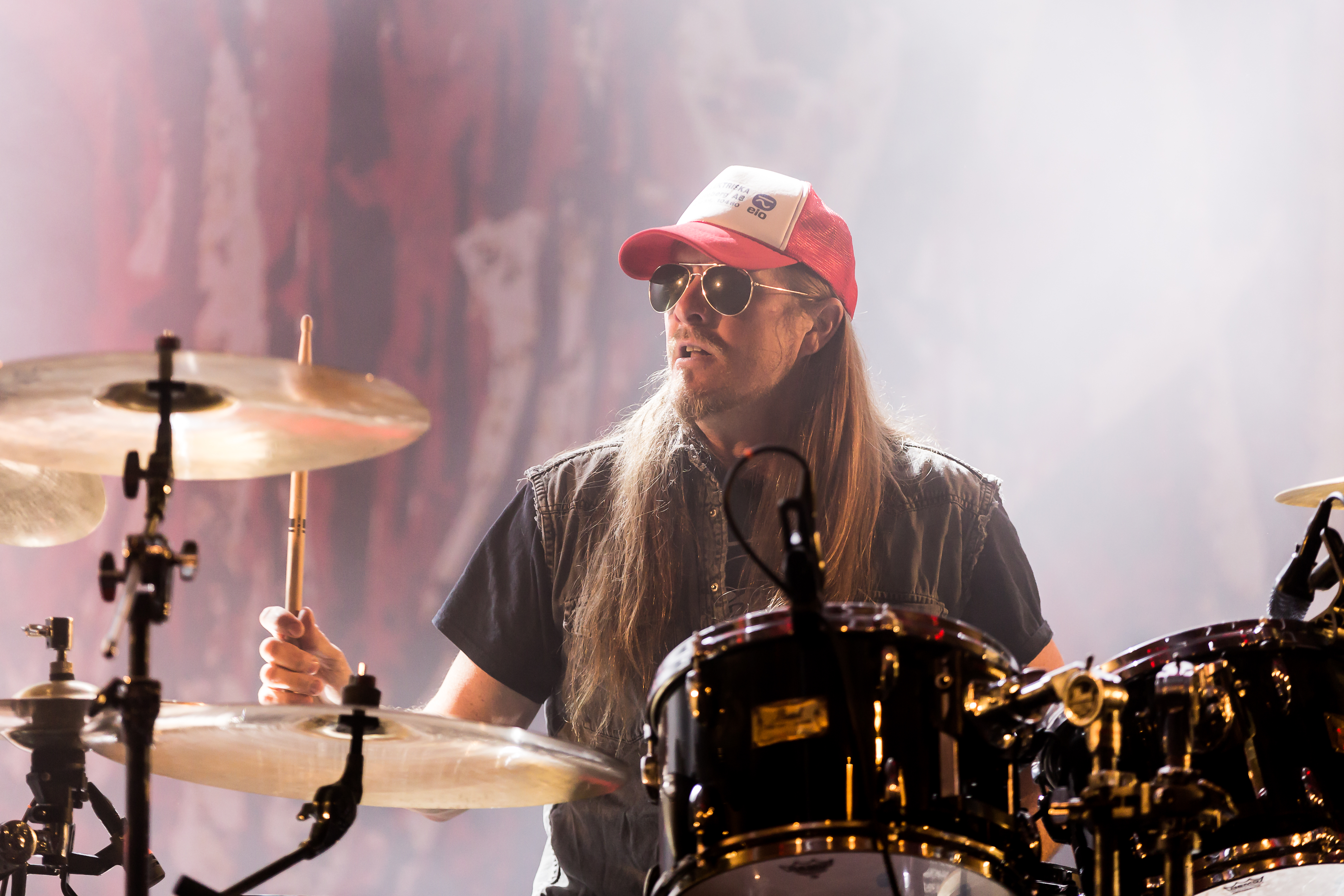
Martin "Axe" Axenrot, drums

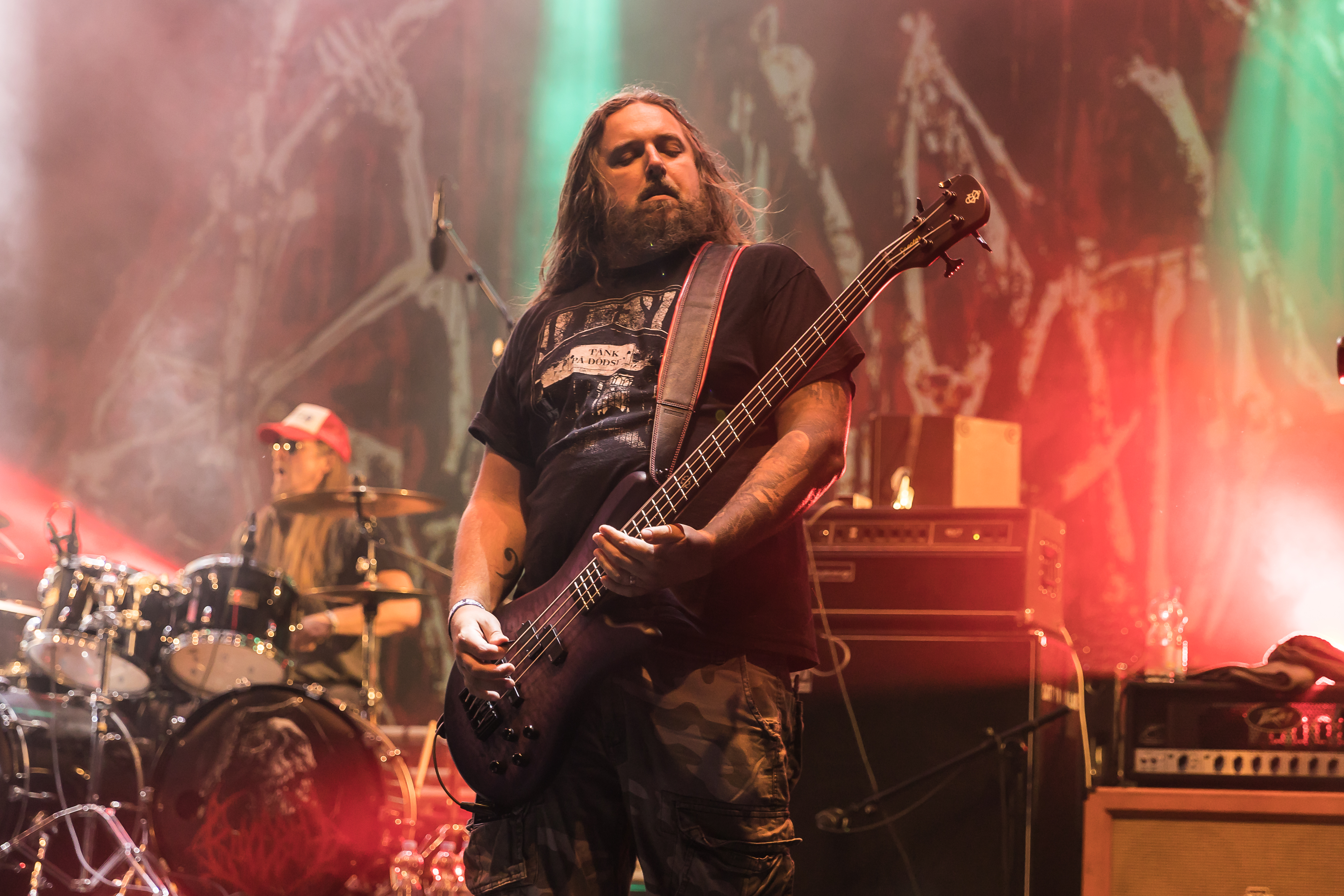
Joakim Antman, bass (live)

=== Session members ===
- Joakim Antman – bass (2023–present)
- Niklas Sandin – bass (2018)
- Waltteri Väyrynen – drums, percussion (2018–2022)

=== Former members ===
- Jonas "Lord Seth" Renkse – bass, backing vocals (1998–2023)
- Mikael Åkerfeldt – lead vocals (1998–2004, 2005–2012)
- Dan Swanö – drums, percussion (1998– 2004), guitars (2004–2006), backing vocals (1998– 2006)
- Per "Sodomizer" Eriksson – guitars (2007–2017)
- Peter Tägtgren – lead vocals (2004–2005)
- Joakim Karlsson – guitars (2018–2019)
- Tomas "Plytet" Åkvik – guitar (2022–2024; session 2017–2022)

== Discography ==
=== Studio albums ===
- Resurrection Through Carnage (2002)
- Nightmares Made Flesh (2004)
- The Fathomless Mastery (2008)
- Grand Morbid Funeral (2014)
- The Arrow of Satan Is Drawn (2018)
- Survival of the Sickest (2022)

=== EPs ===
- Breeding Death (2000)
- Unblessing the Purity (2008)

=== Live albums ===
- The Wacken Carnage (2005)
- Bloodbath over Bloodstock (2011)
