= Absence of light (disambiguation) =

Absence of light refers to darkness, the physical condition of absence of light.

Absence of light may also refer to:

- Aphotic zone, the portion of a lake or ocean where there is little or no sunlight
- This Blinding Absence of Light, a 2001 novel by Moroccan writer Tahar Ben Jelloun
- In the Absence of Light, a 2010 album by black metal band Abigail Williams
- "Absence of Light", a song by Symphony X from the 2000 album V: The New Mythology Suite
