= In the Shadow of a Thousand Suns =

Studio album by Abigail Williams
- Released: October 28, 2008
- Studios: Hollow (New York City); Legacy (New York City); Akkerhuagen Lyd (Notodden, Norway); Big Blue Meenie (Jersey City, New Jersey, USA); The Safehouse (Florida, USA)
- Genre: Symphonic black metal
- Length: 46:38
- Label: Candlelight
- Producers: James Murphy, Ken Sorceron

Abigail Williams chronology
Legend (2006)	In the Shadow of a Thousand Suns (2008)	In the Absence of Light (2010)

Alternative cover
- 2010 deluxe edition

Professional ratings
Review scores
Source	Rating
About.com	4/5 stars
Allmusic	3.5/5 stars
Exclaim!	(favorable)
Terrorizer	4/10 stars

In the Shadow of a Thousand Suns is the debut album by American black metal band Abigail Williams. It was released on October 28, 2008, on Candlelight Records. A vast majority of the album was written and composed by lead vocalist Ken Sorceron, who played guitar on all the tracks, including bass (except track 8) and also co-produced the record.

In the Shadow of a Thousand Suns peaked at #35 on Billboard's Top Heatseekers chart. The album was reissued on January 12, 2010, as a deluxe edition that included a second disc featuring five previously unreleased tracks. The vinyl pressing of the reissue was limited to 1,000 copies.

== History ==
The album was produced by James Murphy (former guitarist of Death, Obituary, Testament, and Cancer). Trym Torson, of Emperor and Enslaved, played drums on the majority of the album, excluding the tracks "Floods," "Acolytes," and "Empyrean." Most of the songs were written by vocalist Ken Sorceron while the band was on hiatus in 2007. The album took more than six months to record.

Abigail Williams released the deluxe edition of In the Shadow of a Thousand Suns on January 12, 2010, which included a second disc featuring four new songs, one unreleased demo of "Floods," and the music video for "Into the Ashes." Demo versions of these tracks were made available on the digital download Tour 2009 EP, released November 9, 2009. The EP consisted of "I Am (God)," "In Death Comes the Great Silence," the instrumental "Waiting for the Rain," "Infernal Divide," and "Floods." The demo version of "Floods" was included on the new release because, as Sorceron stated, "it captures the vibe of the song better than the album track; perhaps due to the work of original drummer Zack Gibson."

== "Into the Ashes" music video ==
=== Concept ===
The music video for "Into the Ashes" intercuts a brief tale of a girl and a man with the band performing the song in a catacomb setting. The dark ambiance and characters' period dress creates a gothic feel over the entire video, although the band members remain in contemporary apparel, including T-shirts and jeans.

The story begins during the instrumental introduction of the song. A girl sets a dining room table in a dark room lit only with two candles. A man appears from off screen and sits down opposite the girl. In the next sequence, the two of them are shown dancing within the catacombs, shown in silhouette and shadow. As the girl steps into the light, the man lets her go and walks away. The song jumps into its heavy, fast-tempo riffs, and the video repeatedly cuts between shots of the guitarists and drummer while the girl slowly walks back into the shadows.

As Sorceron begins singing, the element of camera shake is introduced. The girl wanders emotionally through rooms of paraphernalia, her face always remaining dark or covered by her hands. The video begins focusing on the band members' performances, cutting between guitars, drums, keyboards, and singing, infrequently using strobing lights to emphasize the double-bass rhythm.

A close-up of the girl's face, now sleeping, reveals make-up smeared from tears. The song breaks down into a slower, heavier bridge, and the girl is shown looking in a mirror, applying lipstick. In the dark area of the mirror, a man's face appears, disappearing immediately as she turns around in surprise. The man is seen in silhouette, walking away from a single chair. As he walks around the corner, the song reverts to its faster riffs and a single shot of the man and girl together appears briefly. The video cuts to the girl sleeping, and the man's hand reaches out to her from offscreen. She wakes up, and the two characters are reunited.

=== Production ===
Abigail Williams performing beneath the London Bridge in the music video for "Into the Ashes".

"Into the Ashes" was directed by Khaled Lowe and Ben Caird and edited by Lowe. Cinematography was done by Kathinka Minthe, who shot the video on the DVCPRO HD format. Visual effects work was done by Alex Arpaillange.

Cameo lighting was incorporated throughout the entire video, although the story portion of the video altered its single point of light to achieve both chiaroscuro and silhouette effects. The band was almost consistently lighted from the "front" (behind the camera), with varying degrees of brightness, at times revealing the subterranean backdrop. The band was shown in complete silhouette only briefly during strobed sequences.

Filming took place beneath the London Bridge immediately after the band had returned from eight weeks of touring. Sorceron described the location as, "[a] dungeon-like area that they used to store dead bodies in. We felt right at home, minus the smell, of course." The video is anachronistic in that the band lineup changed drastically after its release. Sorceron is the only member in the video to remain in Abigail Williams.

"Into the Ashes" had its television premiere on MTV's Headbangers Ball on December 6, 2008, although the video was posted online prior to this.

== Track listing ==
All tracks are written by Ken Sorceron and Ashley Ellyllon, except where noted.

No.	Title	Music	Length
1.	"I"	Sorceron	0:39
2.	"The World Beyond"		6:16
3.	"Acolytes"		4:59
4.	"A Thousand Suns"		5:08
5.	"Into the Ashes"		4:38
6.	"Smoke and Mirrors"	Sorceron	4:52
7.	"A Semblance of Life"	Sorceron	2:06
8.	"Empyrean: Into the Cold Wastes"	Sorceron, Plaguehammer	6:15
9.	"Floods"		5:47
10.	"The Departure"		5:55

Deluxe Edition Disc 2: (Agharta)
No.	Title	Music	Length
1.	"I Am (God)"	Sorceron	4:56
2.	"In Death Comes the Great Silence"	Sorceron	6:37
3.	"Waiting for the Rain"	Sorceron	1:33
4.	"Infernal Divide"	Sorceron	5:16
5.	"Floods (Demo)"		6:14

== Personnel ==
Abigail Williams

- Ken Sorceron – lead vocals, guitar, bass, keyboards
- Thomas G. Plaguehammer – bass guitar
- Ashley Ellyllon – piano, synths, orchestration, backing vocals
- Mike Wilson – guitar solos, additional guitar
- Trym Torson – drums (tracks 1, 2, 4–7, & 10)
- Sam "Samus" Paulicelli – drums (tracks 3, 8 & 9)

Additional musicians

- Mike Heller – mallets
- Zach Gibson – drums (Agharta)
- Alana Potocnik – keyboards (Agharta)
- Ian Jekelis – additional guitar (Agharta)

Production

- Thorbjørn Akkerhuagen – engineer (Trym's drums)
- James Murphy – mixing, engineer, mastering, producer, acoustic guitar, guitar solo
- Ken Soceron – producer, mixing (Agharta), programming (Agharta)
- Ryan Kelly – engineer (vocals and Samus's drums)
- Toshihiro Egawa – cover art
- Matt Vickerstaff – cover art
- Christophe Szpajdel – logo

== Release history ==
Region	Version	Date	Format	Notes
North America	In the Shadow of a Thousand Suns	October 28, 2008	CD, digital download	
North America	Tour 2009 EP	November 9, 2009	Digital download	Consists of only of demo versions of the deluxe edition's second disc
North America	Deluxe Edition	January 12, 2010	2 CD, vinyl, digital download	
North America	In the Shadow of a Thousand Suns (Agharta)	January 12, 2010	Digital download	Consists of only the second disc of the deluxe edition

== Notes ==
1. The 2010 reissue does not specify an edition title, causing a lack of consistency in the naming convention. Retailers have referred to the two-disc album as "special edition" and "limited edition", while the band specifically names it the "deluxe edition" on its MySpace blog (and hence most media reports referring it to "deluxe" as well).
2. The second disc, both in the deluxe edition and separately as its own EP, is referred to as In the Shadow of a Thousand Suns (Agharta).
