= James Murphy (guitarist) =

American guitarist (born 1967)

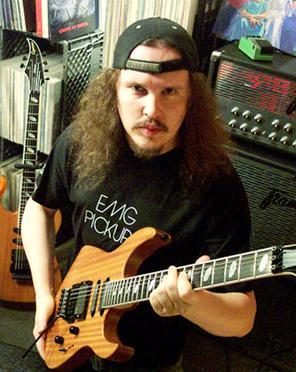

Background information
- Born: James Franklin Murphy; July 30, 1967 (age 59); Portsmouth, Virginia, U.S.
- Genres: Heavy metal; death metal; thrash metal; groove metal; progressive metal
- Occupations: Musician; songwriter; producer; recording and mixing engineer
- Instruments: Guitar; bass; keyboards
- Years active: 1987–present
- Formerly of: Death, Testament, Obituary, Cancer, Disincarnate, Konkhra
- Website: facebook.com/jamesmurphyproducer/

James Franklin Murphy (born July 30, 1967) is an American guitarist. He is best known for his work in metal bands Cancer, Obituary, Death and Testament. He also founded Disincarnate, an early death metal band.

== Career ==
He is working on a tribute album to Death founder Chuck Schuldiner who died from pneumonia, caused by complications of his treatment for a brain tumor. He also produced Deron Miller's band World Under Blood. He also completed production of the industrial death metal band Dååth's second album, The Hinderers, which was released on Roadrunner Records, and Lazarus A.D.'s first album The Onslaught, and its follow-up Black Rivers Flow released on Metal Blade Records,(Lazarus A.D. recorded a demo under the name Lazarus before adding the A.D., it was not released making The Onslaught the bands debut album) and many other productions and mixes on various record labels. He has also performed as a touring guitarist for Agent Steel in Europe and the UK in 1987, and was briefly in Hallows Eve in 1989.

== Personal life ==
He was diagnosed with a brain tumor in 2001 but recovered. In October 2011, Murphy stated that the tumor had returned but that it was non-cancerous and that it was being treated pharmacologically.

In addition to playing guitar, Murphy operates a recording studio, SafeHouse Production, where he has mixed and produced albums for other bands. He has also contributed lessons to Guitar Player magazine.

== Equipment ==
Murphy has used Caparison guitars since he was able to play guitar again after his treatment. During his years with Testament he played modified Fender Stratocasters with Floyd Rose bridges and Ibanez guitars, primarily the S series models, as well as B.C. Rich guitars during the Obituary and Death period, especially Warlock models. With Disincarnate, he used a Gibson Flying V, loaded with an EMG 85 in the bridge position, through a Marshall 8100. He is a longtime endorsee of EMG pickups, and mainly uses the 85 and 89 models, although on Testament's The Gathering his Ibanez were fitted with Dimarzio Steve's Special and Air Norton. For amplification he is currently using Framus Cobra series amplifiers, although previously he used Mesa amps through Mesa 4x12 cabinets with Testament.

== Discography ==
Cancer

- Death Shall Rise (1991)

Death

- Spiritual Healing (1990)

Disincarnate

- Soul Erosion (demo, 1992)
- Dreams of the Carrion Kind (1993)

James Murphy

- Convergence (1996)
- Feeding The Machine (1998)

Konkhra

- Weed Out The Weak (1997)
- The Freakshow (EP, 1999)
- Come Down Cold (1999)
- Nothing Is Sacred (2009)

Obituary

- Cause Of Death (1990)

Testament

- Low (1994)
- Live at the Fillmore (Live, 1995)
- The Gathering (1999)

Guest appearances

- 1000 Ashes – "Guest appearance in first album"
- Abigail Williams – In the Shadow of a Thousand Suns – (Solo on "The World Beyond" and Whammy on "Smoke and Mirrors")
- The Absence – Riders of the Plague (two tracks)
- Agent Steel – (one live track on the re-release)
- Agressor – Medieval Rites (one solo)
- Agressor – The Spirit of Evil (three tracks)
- Artension – Into the Eye of the Storm (one solo)
- Artension – Phoenix Rising (one solo)
- Artension – Forces of Nature (four solos)
- Broken Hope – Repulsive Conception (one solo)
- Cannae – When Gold Becomes Sacrifice (one solo)
- Chaos Disorder – Infested (one solo)
- Crypt Crawler – The Immortal Realm (one solo)
- DÅÅTH – The Hinderers (one solo)
- Demise – Torture Garden (one solo)
- Embryonic Autopsy – Cauterized Womb Impalement (one solo 2022)
- Explorers Club – Age of Impact
- Enforsaken – The Forever Endeavor (Lead guitar on 'All For Nothing')
- Firewind – Forged by Fire (one solo)
- Foreign Objects – Universal Culture Shock (guitar solos)
- Gorguts – Considered Dead (one solo)
- Gruesome – Savage Land (one solo)
- Killfloor Mechanic – Estimated Time of Death (one solo)
- Malevolent Creation – Retribution (one solo)
- Malevolent Creation – The Will to Kill (two solos)
- Martriden – The Unsettling Dark (one solo)
- Memorain – White Line (five solos)
- Only Human -The Dismantling (one solo on the track 'Winter and the Dancing Leeches')
- Outliar – Provoked To Anger (Solo performed on the track "Faceless Enemy")
- Steve Morse – Prime Cuts (one solo)
- Nevermore – This Godless Endeavor (Solo on the track "The Holocaust of Thought")
- Rise – Pentagramnation (2009)
- Rob Van Der Loo's Freak Neil inc. – Characters (3 solos)
- Single Bullet Theory (metal band) – Behind Eyes of Hatred (solo on the track "Shades of Things to Come")
- Single Bullet Theory – IV (one solo on the track "Auctioneer of Souls")
- Solstice – Solstice (four solos + backing vocals)
- Summon – ...And the Blood Runs Black (guest keyboard, acoustic guitar and lead guitar)
- Various artists – Roadrunner United – Annihilation by the Hands of God (solo), Constitution Down (intro solo)
- Various artists – Working Man - A Tribute To Rush (lead guitar, rhythm guitar, and/or keyboards on five songs)
- Vicious Rumors – Sadistic Symphony (one solo)
- John West – Mind Journey (one solo)
- John West – Permanent Mark (one solo)
- Warrel Dane – Praises to the War Machine (Solo on the track "The Day the Rats Went to War")
- World Under Blood – Solo on the track "Under the Autumn Low" between Deron Miller's solos
- Various artists – Guitars That Ate My Brain – "Maiden Voyage" (lead guitar, rhythm guitar, and all lead & rhythm guitar solo's)
