= Ashley Ellyllon =

American keyboardist

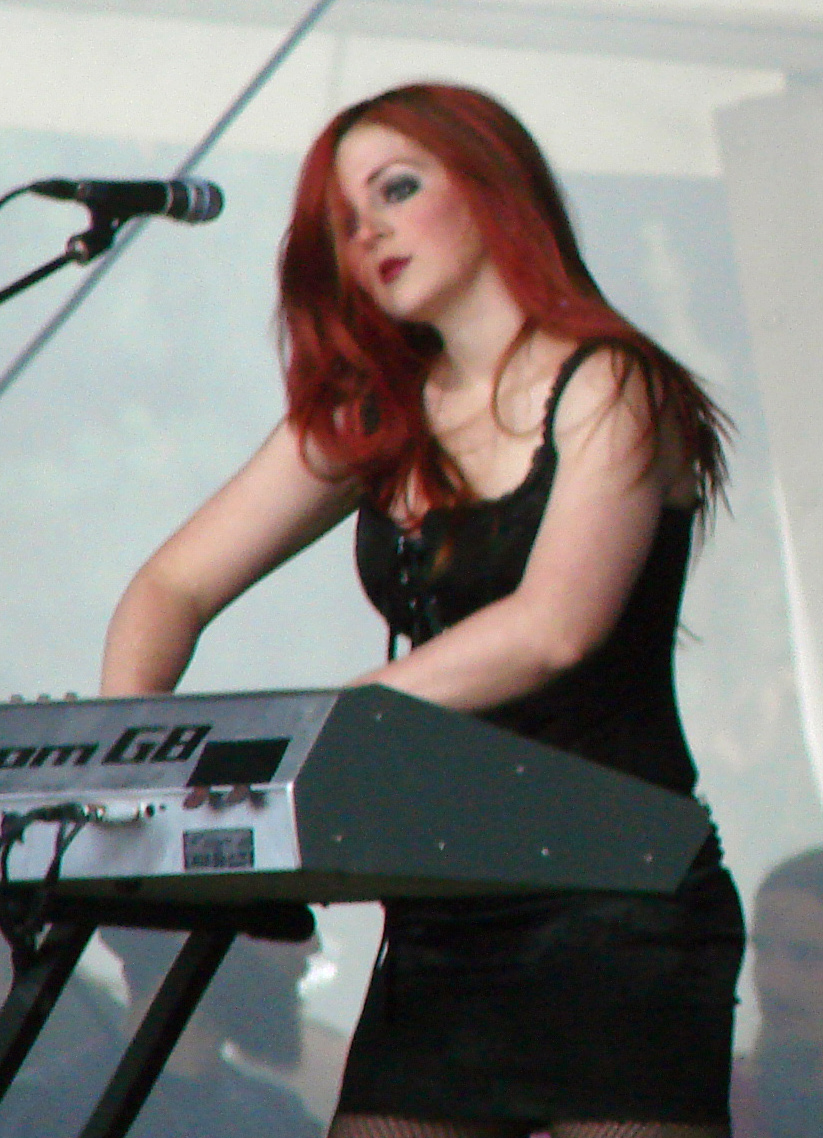
- Ellyllon with Cradle of Filth in 2009

Background information
- Born: Ashley Jurgemeyer; July 30, 1984 (age 41)
- Origin: Scottsdale, Arizona, U.S.
- Genres: Experimental rock, symphonic black metal, extreme metal
- Occupations: Musician, songwriter
- Instruments: Keyboards, piano
- Years active: 2005–present

Ashley Jurgemeyer, also commonly known under the stage name Ashley Ellylon, (born July 30, 1984) is an American keyboardist and songwriter. She is the former keyboardist of symphonic black metal bands Abigail Williams and Cradle of Filth. Ellyllon is also a member of the supergroup Orbs.

== Biography ==
Ashley Jurgemeyer was classically trained on piano since age six. She got her bachelor's degree in Music Composition and Theory from Arizona State University and then started her career as a founding member of the band Abigail Williams in 2005. She appears on the Abigail Williams albums In the Shadow of a Thousand Suns and Legend.

While with Abigail Williams, in 2007 Jurgemeyer formed the progressive rock project Orbs with Dan Briggs of Between the Buried and Me and Adam Fisher of Fear Before. The band began as an online project working across the United States in a similar fashion of The Postal Service.

She left Abigail Williams in 2009 after becoming the new keyboardist for Cradle of Filth, adopting the name Ashley Ellylon and replacing Rosie Smith. She provided keyboards and vocals on the 2010 Cradle of Filth album Darkly, Darkly, Venus Aversa. Also in 2010, Orbs released their debut album Asleep Next to Science

Ellylon left Cradle of Filth in 2011; that year she made a guest appearance on the album Until I Feel Nothing by Carnifex. In 2012 she briefly returned to Abigail Williams and appeared on the album Becoming. Orbs released their second album Past Life Regression in 2016.

== Discography ==
=== Abigail Williams ===
- Legend (EP, 2006)
- In the Shadow of a Thousand Suns (2008)
- Becoming (2012)

=== Orbs ===
- Asleep Next to Science (2010)
- Past Life Regression (2016)

=== Cradle of Filth ===
- Darkly, Darkly, Venus Aversa (2010)
