= Past Life Regression =

Past Life Regression may refer to:

- Past life regression, a technique purporting to recover memories of past lives
- Past Life Regression, a 2015 album by the band Orbs
