= The Arrow of Satan Is Drawn =

Studio album by Bloodbath
- Released: 26 October 2018
- Recorded: January – 23 July 2018
- Studio: Ghost Ward, The City of Glass & Tri-Lamb (Stockholm, Sweden)
- Genre: Death metal, blackened death metal
- Length: 41:06
- Label: Peaceville
- Producer: Bloodbath

Bloodbath chronology
Grand Morbid Funeral (2014)	The Arrow of Satan Is Drawn (2018)	Survival of the Sickest (2022)

Singles from The Arrow of Satan Is Drawn
- 1. "Bloodicide" Released: 13 September 2018; 2. "Chainsaw Lullaby" Released: 18 October 2018

Professional ratings
Review scores
Source	Rating
Forté	3/5 stars
Gaffa	4/6
Laut.de	4/5 stars
Loud Magazine Australia	87/100
Metal Hammer	6/7
Nya Wermlands-Tidningen	4/5 stars
Rock Hard	8/10

The Arrow of Satan Is Drawn is the fifth studio album by Swedish death metal band Bloodbath, released on 26 October 2018 via Peaceville. It is the only album to feature guitarist Joakim Karlsson.

== Background and release ==
In a 2017 interview with Metal Wani, frontman Nick Holmes stated that the band will enter the studio in the end of January next year to record the follow-up to Grand Morbid Funeral. The recording process had officially concluded on 23 July 2018, with hints at featuring "legendary" guests on the album. On 17 August 2018, the band have confirmed The Arrow of Satan Is Drawn as title of their new album for a 26 October release via Peaceville. A lyric video for the first single of the album "Bloodicide", which featuring Jeff Walker of Carcass, John Walker of Cancer and Karl Willetts of Memoriam and formerly of Bolt Thrower, was available for streaming on 13 September 2018. On 18 October 2018, the band released a music video for the song "Chainsaw Lullaby".

Guitarist Anders "Blakkheim" Nyström commented on The Arrow of Satan Is Drawn:

What are we presenting with this album? Humanity's unfaltering march prone towards downfall. The threat to this world isn't from far beyond the sun, the enemy is right here, within the walls. Only the god of emptiness will survive us all. The arrow of Satan is drawn! It wasn't deliberately planned to be just British guests, but as it randomly turned out that way, it became a really cool feat! Nick [Holmes], Jeff, Karl and John are all legends respectively within the UK death metal scene and we're proud to bring them all together on our little old school soiree to tribute the days of old.

== Track listing ==
No.	Title	Writer(s)	Length
1.	"Fleischmann"	Jonas Renkse	3:38
2.	"Bloodicide"	Nick Holmes, Anders Nyström	4:56
3.	"Wayward Samaritan"	Joakim Karlsson	3:39
4.	"Levitator"	Renkse	4:37
5.	"Deader"	Nyström	4:05
6.	"March of the Crucifiers"	Renkse	4:04
7.	"Morbid Antichrist"	Holmes, Nyström	4:04
8.	"Warhead Ritual"	Renkse	3:38
9.	"Only the Dead Survive"	Karlsson, Nyström, John Sjölin	5:06
10.	"Chainsaw Lullaby"	Nyström	3:19
Total length:			41:06

Limited edition bonus tracks and 7" vinyl
No.	Title	Writer(s)	Length
11.	"Ride the Waves of Fire"	Karlsson	3:48
12.	"Wide Eyed Abandon"	Holmes, Karlsson	5:00
Total length:			49:54

== Personnel ==
=== Bloodbath ===
- Bloodbath – production, engineering, art direction
  - Old Nick – vocals
  - Joakim (Karlsson) – guitar
  - Blakkheim – guitar
  - Lord Seth – bass guitar
  - Axe – drums

=== Additional musicians ===
- Jeff Walker – guest vocals (track 2)
- John Walker (Cancer) – guest vocals (track 2)
- Karl Willetts – guest vocals (track 2)
- Plytet (Tomas Åkvik) (Lik, Nale) – guitar solo (tracks 4, 8)

=== Production ===
- Karl Daniel Lidén – engineering, mixing, mastering
- Eliran Kantor – cover art
- Matt Vickerstaff – artwork, layout
- Steve Brown – photography

== Charts ==
Chart (2018)	Peak position
Austrian Albums (Ö3 Austria)	51
Finnish Albums (Suomen virallinen lista)	37
German Albums (Offizielle Top 100)	50
Scottish Albums (OCC)	86
Swiss Albums (Schweizer Hitparade)	62
