= Abigail Williams (band) =

American black metal band

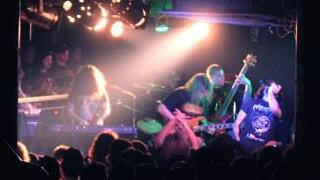
- Abigail Williams performing in 2006

Background information
- Origin: Phoenix, Arizona, U.S.
- Genres: Black metal, symphonic black metal, metalcore (early)
- Years active: 2004–present (short hiatus in 2007)
- Label: Candlelight
- Members: Ken Sorceron

Abigail Williams is an American black metal band formed in Phoenix, Arizona, and currently based in Olympia, Washington. Since its formation in 2004, the band has undergone frequent line-up changes. The group briefly disbanded in 2007 before reforming and recording its debut full-length album. Following an eight-week tour in support of their debut album, In the Shadow of a Thousand Suns (2008), vocalist Ken Sorceron became the sole remaining founding member.

The band performed symphonic black metal. With the release of their second full-length album, In the Absence of Light (2010), Abigail Williams shifted toward a standardized, pure black metal sound. This direction continued on their third full-length album, Becoming (2012), while also including atmospheric elements.

== History ==
Abigail Williams was founded in 2004 by guitarist Ken Bergeron, who later became the vocalist and would eventually adopt the moniker Ken Sorceron. Bergeron was previously the bassist of the Arizonan industrial rock band Victims in Ecstacy, and also participated in various hardcore and metal acts around Phoenix.

Abigail Williams' first songs were six demo tracks that were streamed on the band's Myspace profile with a sound described by the band as having "the groove and melody of Gothenburg style death metal, the face smashing breakdowns of the hardcore scene, topped with the bombastic and epic approach favored by the frostbitten black metal hordes". These demo songs were later packaged by a fan into a "demo" release bootleg with the title Gallow Hill along with unique accompanying artwork, the bootleg appeared online in 2005. Three of these demo tracks would be re-recorded for the Legend EP, including "Melquiades (The Great Work)", which was re-titled "The Conqueror Wyrm" and "Swollen Disgust", which was released as "Like Carrion Birds".

After touring extensively, including a United Kingdom tour in 2006, the band had their debut release through Candlelight Records, which was the Legend EP in 2006, which mixed metalcore influences with symphonic black metal, and was described by Allmusic as "a perfect example of an American recording with a very Nordic-influenced sound". According to vocalist/guitarist Ken Sorceron, the EP was only released so that the band would have something to promote, explaining "a lot of the songs are, like, older songs, and they felt a bit old. At the time we were trying to make an album and we just couldn't finish it on time for some tours". After touring with Dark Funeral and Enslaved, the band split up in early 2007, although Sorceron later claimed that rather than a permanent split it was a pre-meditated hiatus. Sorceron and Wilson continued playing together in another band, and eventually asked the original Abigail Williams bassist Thomas G. Plaguehammer to join them on drums. They decided to resume Abigail Williams as a band, with Plaguehammer returning to bass, Zach Gibson and Bjorn Dannov rejoining, and also Kristen Randall (Winds of Plague) joining the band. After a tour in late 2007, their drummer and keyboard player left, with Ashley Ellylon rejoining on keyboards and Samus becoming the new permanent drummer.

The band went into the studio with producer James Murphy (former guitarist of Obituary, Testament, and Cancer) to record their debut album, In the Shadow of a Thousand Suns, released in October 2008, on which the metalcore influences that the band had on their previous songs was completely abandoned. The sound of the debut album has even drawn comparisons to Dimmu Borgir and Cradle of Filth. Much of its inspiration came from the melodic metal scene found in the Nordic countries. Because bands from these countries were immersed in the mythology of their respective countries, Abigail Williams looked into American history. Arthur Miller's The Crucible brought Abigail Williams, one of the original and foremost accusers in the Salem witch trials of 1692, to their attention.

"The accuser is always relevant in society. In America there were the witch trials, the Red Scare, and now terrorism. Everyone is always quick to point a finger; we do it out of fear, prejudice, and because of things we don’t understand. So, the accuser will always be present in society. Abigail Williams really stuck out to us, not only due to the above mentioned, but also because it possessed that iconic quality, while still sounding very American. We want people to know where we are from, and that even though it may not be cool/trendy, we are proud of our American culture."

— Thomas G. Plaguehammer, About.com

The influence of European metal, particularly Scandinavian, is again evident. The album took more than six months to record, and black metal drummer Trym Torson of Emperor and Enslaved played drums on all tracks on the album except "Floods", "Acolytes", and "Empyrean". Most of the songs were written by Sorceron while the band was on hiatus in 2007. The band toured Europe and the UK in summer 2008. In 2009, keyboardist Ashley Ellylon became the new keyboardist for Cradle of Filth, replacing Rosie Smith. In October 2009, Sam "Samus" Paulicelli also left to focus on other projects.

Abigail Williams released the deluxe edition of In the Shadow of a Thousand Suns on January 12, 2010, which included a second disc featuring four new songs, one unreleased demo of "Floods," and the music video for "Into the Ashes".

Abigail Williams released their second full-length album, called In the Absence of Light, via Candlelight Records on September 28, 2010. The album shows a considerable difference from the rest of the band's discography, noting its pure black metal sound instead of symphonic black metal.

The band began work on a new album in the summer of 2011, titled Becoming, which was released on January 24, 2012, through Candlelight Records. It was the band's third full-length album through the label. Frontman, Sorceron handled all production aspects of the album. Before its release, the song "Ascension Sickness" leaked early on November 10, 2011, onto YouTube.

On July 2, 2012, Abigail Williams announced that this year's US tour would be the last ever and that they are disbanding. Since this, however, they have stated that they plan on recording another studio album along with further tour dates.

On August 25, 2015, Abigail Williams announced their forthcoming album titled The Accuser via their Facebook page. The Accuser features eight tracks and was released on Oct 30, 2015.

On March 19, 2018, Sorceron announced his departure from the technical death metal band The Faceless on his Facebook page, and would be putting his focus on finishing the next Abigail Williams album. The same day, The Faceless drummer Bryce Butler also announced his departure, and his new role as live drummer for Abigail Williams.

On November 14, 2019, Abigail Williams released their fifth studio album titled Walk Beyond the Dark featuring seven songs.

== Band members ==
Current

- Ken "Sorceron" Bergeron – guitars, vocals, keyboards, drums (2004–present)

Live

- Ken "Emoji" Bedene – drums (2009–2011)
- Jesse Beahler – drums (2013)
- Micah Leonetti – bass (2015)
- Kelsie Hargita – keyboards (2016)
- Bryan O' Sullivan – guitars (2018–2019); bass (2012–2013)
- Bryce Butler – drums (2018–2021)
- Vance Valenzuela – guitars (2019–present)
- John Porada – bass (2013–2014, 2021–present)
- Gabe Seeber – drums (2021–present)

Former

- Connor Woods – vocals (2004–2006)
- Brad Riffs – guitars (2004–2006)
- Mark Kozuback – bass (2004–2006)
- Bjorn "Bjornthor" Dannov – guitars (2004–2007, 2008–2009)
- Ashley "Ellyllon" Jurgemeyer – keyboards (2004–2008, 2012–2013)
- Kyle Dickinson – bass, backing vocals (2006)
- Andy Schroeder – drums (2006)
- Michael Wilson – guitars (2006–2007, 2007–2009)
- Zach Gibson – drums (2006–2007, 2007, 2011–2012)
- Kristen Randall – keyboards (2007)
- Thomas G. Plaguehammer – bass, backing vocals (2007–2009)
- Samus "66Samus" Paulicelli – drums (2008–2009)
- Alana Potocnik – keyboards (2009)
- Ian Jekelis – guitars (2009–2014)
- Jered "Threatin" Eames – bass (2010)
- Griffin Wotawa – bass (2011–2012)
- Alan Cassidy – drums (2011–2012)
- James Jungmann – bass (2012)
- Jeff Wilson – guitars (2013–2018), bass (2013), keyboards (2015)
- Charlie Fell – drums (2014–2015), bass, backing vocals (2015)
- Will Lindsay – bass (2014–2015)
- Chason Westmoreland – drums (2016)

Timeline

== Discography ==
Studio albums

- In the Shadow of a Thousand Suns (2008)
- In the Absence of Light (2010)
- Becoming (2012)
- The Accuser (2015)
- Walk Beyond the Dark (2019)
- A Void Within Existence (2025)

EPs

- Legend (2006)
- Tour 2009 EP (2009)

== Videography ==
- "Into the Ashes" (2008)
- "Nuummite" (2015)
