= Tactical (album) =

Studio album by World Under Blood
- Released: July 26, 2011
- Recorded: 2006–2010
- Studio: HIV + Cocksplitter Studios and Keene Machine Studios (Los Angeles, California)
- Genre: Melodic death metal
- Length: 36:38
- Label: Nuclear Blast
- Producer: Deron Miller; James Murphy

Tactical is the debut studio album by American melodic death metal band World Under Blood. Recorded at HIV + Cocksplitter and Keene Machine Studios in Los Angeles, California with Logan Mader and Michael Keene, it was produced by the band's frontman Deron Miller and guest musician James Murphy. The album was released on July 26, 2011, by Nuclear Blast Records.

The material for Tactical was written by Miller and arranged with drummer Tim Yeung, with the exception of the two cover versions: Megadeth's "Wake Up Dead" and Malevolent Creation's "Alliance or War". Murphy mixed and mastered the album. Tactical reached number 23 on the Billboard Top Heatseekers chart, selling around 900 copies in its first week.

== Recording and production ==
Deron Miller (vocals, guitar, bass, keyboards) and Tim Yeung (drums, keyboards) first began performing together as World Under Blood in October 2006, recording three demo tracks with engineer Logan Mader in Los Angeles, California. The demo recordings, for the songs "Under the Autumn Low", "God Among the Waste", and "Dead and Still in Pain", were eventually released between November 2006 and September 2007.

Recording for Tactical took place at Mader's HIV + Cocksplitter Studios and second engineer Michael Keene's Keene Machine Studios in Los Angeles. Death guitarist James Murphy joined the group as a guest musician, performing guitar solos, bass and keyboards on numerous songs on the album, which he also mixed and mastered.

== Release and reception ==
Recording for the album was completed by March 2010, but due to Miller's return to working with CKY its release was pushed back from July 2010 to July 2011. Although no singles were released from Tactical, a music video (directed by Shan Dan Horan) was produced for the song "Into the Arms of Cruelty". Upon its release, Tactical reached number 32 on the Billboard Top Heatseekers chart, selling approximately 900 copies in the week of release.

== Composition ==
Lyrically, Tactical deals with a number of complex personal and philosophical concepts, which Miller detailed in a track-by-track feature prior to the album's release. Within the feature, the band's frontman proclaimed that he was "obsessed with mental illness", and noted that at least three tracks on the album featured lyrical references to various mental conditions – "Pyro-Compulsive" is based on "the idea of someone lusting over lighting their house on fire while they're inside"; "Dead and Still in Pain" is written about depression and anxiety, in particular "not knowing what to do with yourself or where to turn"; and "Under the Autumn Low" references seasonal affective disorder, from which Miller claims he suffers on a regular basis.

"Into the Arms of Cruelty", which Miller has claimed is one of his favorite songs on the album, is described as the vocalist's "unrestrained opinion" on child abuse, which he says makes him "fucking sick". A number of tracks also deal with viewpoints on political issues – opening track "A God Among the Waste", for example, is described as a song about "finding a legitimate political leader, and finally cleaning up the U.S.", while the lyrics of "Purgatory Dormitory" discuss the idea of using torture as a punishment for criminals, with Miller theorising about "numbing every nerve in a criminal’s body, blinding and deafening them, and leaving them with just their brain ... to think and to suffer".

Organized religion is another subject discussed on Tactical, in particular on the track "I Can't Stand His Name", which is aimed at no particular faith or religious practice in particular but instead concerns the general power and style of organized religion, including preaching. The final original track on the album, "Revere's Tears", is based on the story of George Revere, who is described by Miller as "a genius doctor" who allegedly discovered a cure for cancer before being murdered; the song is essentially written about the conspiracy theory that "if you do discover a cure for cancer, you will either be privately bought out, or killed", with the singer making reference to other diseases such as HIV/AIDS and diabetes.

== Track listing ==
All tracks are written by Deron Miller, except where noted.

No.	Title	Length
1.	"A God Among the Waste"	4:14
2.	"Into the Arms of Cruelty"	4:39
3.	"Pyro-Compulsive"	4:44
4.	"Dead and Still in Pain"	4:13
5.	"Purgatory Dormitory"	3:24
6.	"Under the Autumn Low"	4:04
7.	"I Can't Stand His Name"	3:06
8.	"Revere's Tears"	4:45
9.	"Wake Up Dead" (Megadeth cover written by Dave Mustaine)	3:32
Total length:		36:38

Deluxe edition bonus tracks
No.	Title	Length
10.	"Alliance or War" (Malevolent Creation cover written by Jason Blachowicz, Phil Fasciana and Jon Rubin)	3:37
Total length:		40:15

2013 vinyl reissue bonus tracks
No.	Title	Length
10.	"Alliance or War" (Malevolent Creation cover written by Jason Blachowicz, Phil Fasciana and Jon Rubin)	3:37
11.	"Dead and Still in Pain" (Logan Mader mix)	4:13
12.	"A God Among the Waste" (rough mix/original arrangement)	4:16
Total length:		48:44

== Personnel ==
- Deron Miller – vocals, guitar, bass, keyboards, production, arrangements
- Tim Yeung – drums, keyboards, arrangement assistance
- Luke Jaeger – lead guitar
- Risha Eryavec – bass
- James Murphy – guitar solos, bass, keyboards, production, mixing, mastering
- Logan Mader – engineering, recording
- Michael Keene – engineering, recording
- Dan Malloy – editing assistance
- Nick Millard – additional editing assistance
- Pär Olofsson – cover artwork
- Travis Smith – inside booklet artwork
- Rob Kimura – layout
