= Asleep Next to Science =

Studio album by Orbs
- Released: August 17, 2010
- Recorded: February 2009
- Studio: The Basement
- Genres: Progressive rock, experimental rock, post-hardcore
- Length: 66:42
- Label: Equal Vision
- Producer: Jamie King

Asleep Next to Science is the debut studio album by American progressive rock band Orbs. It was released August 17, 2010 through Equal Vision Records and produced by Jamie King, known for producing Between the Buried and Me and Alesana.

== Background ==
Orbs entered the studio at The Basement recording studio in Winston-Salem, North Carolina in February 2009. On April 4, 2010, the band released a free download of two songs from the album to fans who signed up to their mailing list.

The band describes the album as "the product of long-distance friendships linked through an appreciation for music, nature, and a mutual desire to defy common song structure." A tour in support of the album began on August 19, 2010 in Greensboro, North Carolina.

Professional ratings
Review scores
Source	Rating
Alternative Press	3.5/5 stars
Lush Beat	5/5 stars
Rock Sound	(8/10)
Allmusic	3/5 stars

== Track listing ==
No.	Title	Length
1.	"Sayer of the Law"	7:21
2.	"A Man of Science"	5:45
3.	"Megaloblastic Madness"	7:53
4.	"The Northwestern Bearitories": I. "We the Animal" (5:48); II. "Kid Cancer" (4:17)"	10:05
5.	"People Will Read Again"	10:10
6.	"Something Beautiful"	5:38
7.	"Lost at Sea"	5:45
8.	"Eclipsical"	14:05
Total length:		1:06:42

== Personnel ==
Orbs

- Adam Fisher – vocals, electronic programming
- Dan Briggs – guitar, bass
- Ashley Ellyllon – keyboards, piano
- Clayton Holyoak – drums, percussion
- Chuck Johnson – Additional vocals on "We the Animal" and "Lost at Sea"

Production

- Produced by Jamie King
- Audio mixing by Jamie King
- Illustration by Ben Tuttle
