= Disincarnate =

American band

Disincarnate was an early death metal band fronted by guitarist James Murphy, also of Testament, Cancer, Obituary, and Death. Active in the 1990s, the band released one full-length studio album, Dreams of the Carrion Kind, in 1993.

Disincarnate's music contained elements of progressive metal. The band's lyrics have been described as "your standard grizzly [sic] death metal fare."

== History ==
Disincarnate formed in the 1990s and toured in 1993. The band released its only full-length studio album, Dreams of the Carrion Kind, that same year.

The band's drummer, Tommy Viator, who also played in Acid Bath, died in May 2024. His cause of death is unknown. James Murphy wrote on social media, "RIP Disincarnate drummer Tommy Viator, pictured here to the far left in 1993. I have no idea what happened, I just know that he is gone. Tommy was a key element to the band's sound, with a drumming style all his own… he helped make the Dreams of the Carrion Kind album heavy as hell without a single blast beat, at least not as that technique is known today. He was wearing my leather in this pic, I don't really remember why. We just spoke back at the beginning of April, and he seemed to be in good spirits and having some positive musical activities and plans with musicians local to him near his home in Louisiana. I'm glad we had that conversation, and I'm very glad that I let him know that I appreciated him at the end of it. I would've said so much more if I had known, but we never know."

== Discography ==
- Soul Erosion (demo, 1992)
- Dreams of the Carrion Kind (1993, re-issued 2006)

== Band members ==
- James Murphy - lead and rhythm guitar, bass guitar, acoustic guitars
- Bryan Cegon - vocals
- Jason Carman - rhythm guitar
- Tommy Viator - drums
