= Konkhra =

Danish death metal band

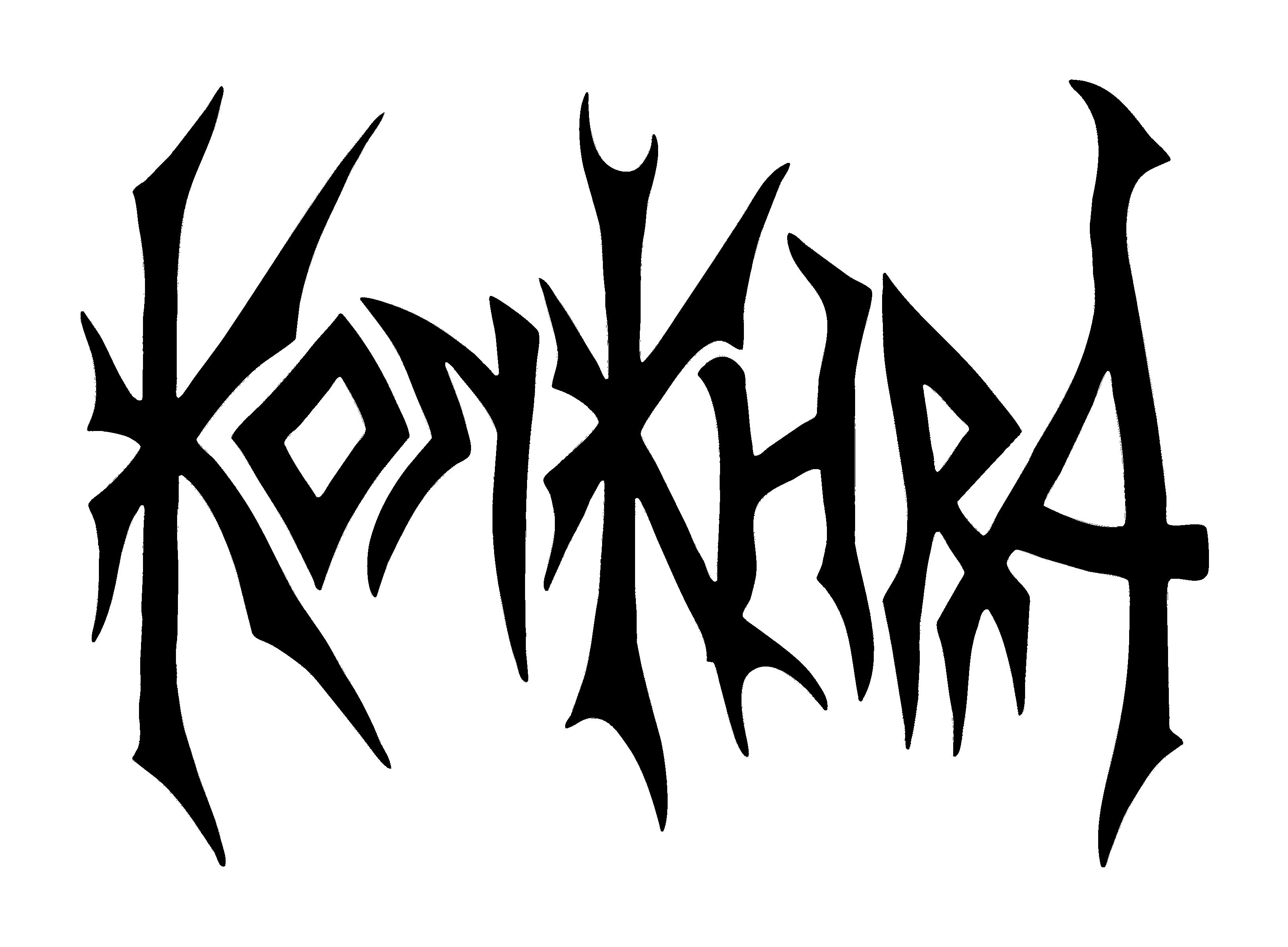
- The group's logo

Background information
- Also known as: Vicious Circle
- Origin: Denmark
- Genres: Death metal, groove metal, thrash metal
- Years active: 1989–present
- Label: Hammerheart Records
- Members: Anders Lundemark; Martin R. Patterson; Johnny Nielsen; Kim 'Hakim' Mathiesen
- Past members: See below
- Website: konkhra.com

Konkhra is a Danish death metal band formed in Køge in 1989. Initially named Vicious Circle, they changed their name to Konkhra in 1990. Konkhra blends death metal with groove metal and thrash. The name "Konkhra" derives from the sound that Tom Angelripper from Sodom makes when he introduces the song "Conqueror" on the 1988 album Mortal Way of Live.

== History ==
The band formed as Vicious Circle in 1988/1989. In 1990, they released the demo The Vicious Circle was released, followed in 1991 by their second demo, Malgrowth.

Their first official record, 1992's Stranded, was released on Progress Records, limited to 3,000 copies.

Their first full-length album, Sexual Affective Disorder, was released on Progress Records in 1993. In 1995, the album Spit or Swallow was released, recorded at Sunlight Studio in Stockholm and produced by Dismember drummer Fred Estby and Tomas Skogsberg. This record made Konkhra the best-selling band on Progress Records, and the band had a career highlights that year at Roskilde Festival, playing for about 10,000 spectators. The concert was released on Live Eraser (1996), the first real live album of death metal according to Lundemark. The band was popular in Europe at that time.

In 1997 came their next album, Weed out the Weak, with guitarist James Murphy (ex-Testament, Obituary) and drummer Chris Kontos (ex-Machine Head, Testament, Exodus). The album was released on Metal Blade for the U.S. market.

The album Reality Check was released on the Italian label Code666 in 2003

The 2009 album Nothing is Sacred featured Murphy on guitar. It was released on Konkhra's own label Chopshop Records. The album Weed out the Weak was re-issued in 2018 on Hammerheart Records. In 2019, the album Alpha and the Omega was released on Hammerheart Records.

Konkhra has toured with many bands in Denmark, South Africa, U.S., Europe, and Israel, including Fear Factory, Brutal Truth, Suffocation, Meatlocker, Deicide, Immolation, Cannibal Corpse, Napalm Death, Behemoth, Volbeat, Batushka, Malevolent Creation, King Diamond, and more.

The band's eighth studio album, Sad Plight of Lucifer, was set for release on 29 November 2024.

== Members ==
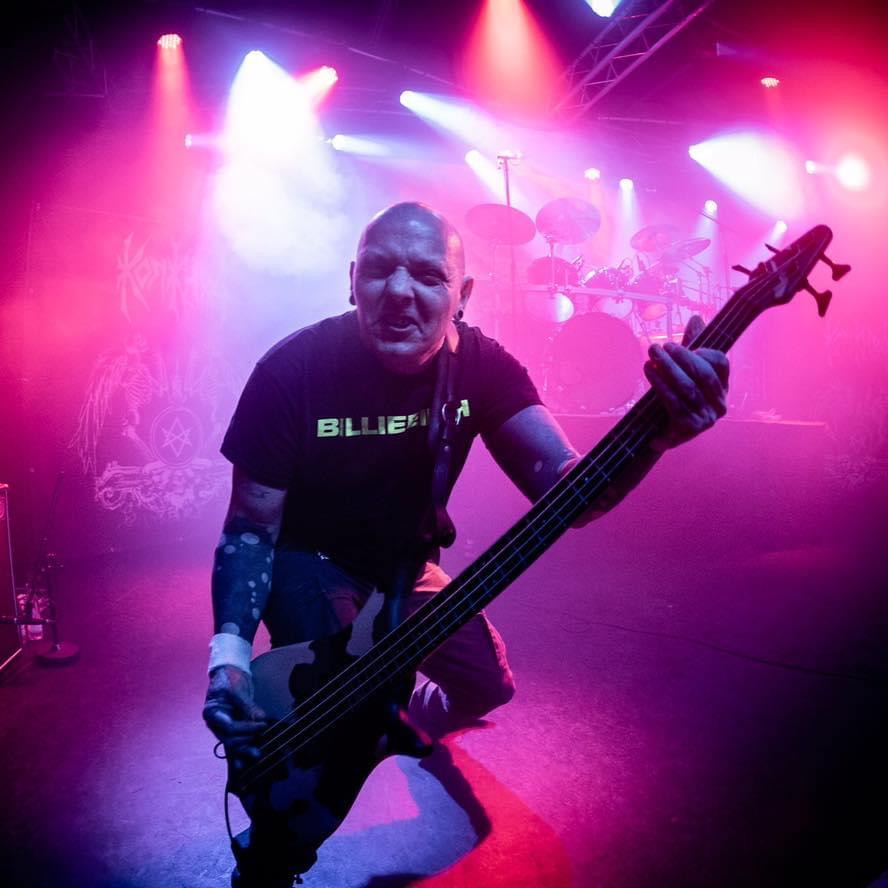
Bassist Martin R. Patterson performing with Konkhra in 2020

Current

- Anders Lundemark – vocals, guitar (1989–present)
- Martin R. Patterson – bass (1991–1992, 2014–present)
- Johnny Nielsen – drums (1993–1996, 2002–2003, 2014–present)
- Kim 'Hakim' Mathiesen – guitar (1994–1996, 2002–2003, 2015–present)

Former

- Claus Vedel – vocals, guitar (1989–1994, died in 2025)
- Jon Clausen – drums (1989–1992)
- Thomas "Gnist" Christensen – bass (1996–1999)
- Chris Kontos – drums (1996–1997)
- Per Möller Jensen – drums (1997–2000)
- James Murphy – guitar (1997–1999, 2009)
- Søren Hee Johansen – bass (1993)
- Lars Schmidt – bass (1993–1996, 1999–2009)
- Mads Lauridsen – drums (2004–2010)
- Michael Skovbakke – guitar (2010–2015)

== Discography ==
Studio albums

- Sexual Affective Disorder (1993)
- Spit or Swallow (1995)
- Weed Out the Weak (1997)
- Come Down Cold (1999)
- Reality Check (2003)
- Nothing Is Sacred (2009)
- Weed Out the Weak (re-issue) (2018)
- Alpha and the Omega (2019)
- Sad Plight of Lucifer (2024)

Live albums

- Live Eraser (1996)

Videos

- Homegrowth (1996)

EPs

- Stranded (1992)
- The Facelift EP (1994)
- The Freakshow (1999)

Demos

- The Vicious Circle (1990)
- Malgrowth (1991)
- Persistence (2005)
