= Victims in Ecstacy =

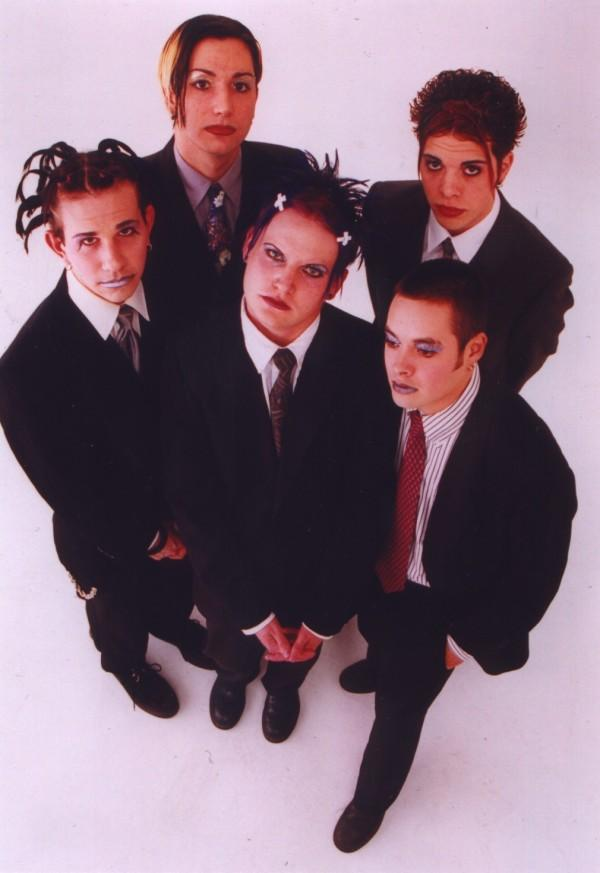
- Clockwise from left: Jared Bakin, Andy Gerold, Ken Bergeron, Danny Diaz, Jim Louvau

Background information
- Origin: Phoenix, Arizona, USA
- Genres: Industrial rock, glam rock
- Years active: 1998–2001
- Labels: Unsigned
- Members: Jim Louvau; Andy Gerold; Jared Bakin; Jim Kaufman; Danny Diaz; Ken Bergeron

Victims in Ecstacy was an industrial rock band from Phoenix, Arizona. The group were active between 1998 and 2001 and operated independently.

== History ==
=== Formation ===
Victims in Ecstacy were formed in 1998 in Phoenix, Arizona by Jim Louvau, Jared Bakin and Andy Gerold. Their style of music was, according to themselves, “New School Arena Rock”. They took influence from bands such as Mary's Window, Faith No More, Guns N' Roses and Plastic Princess. To stand out and differentiate themselves from other local bands in the area they often sported dresses and wore make-up onstage.

== Discography ==
=== Chinese Pornography ===
April 2000 saw the band release their debut album, Chinese Pornography to positive reviews.

Mark Matson of Sipping Soma worked alongside the band to produce the album. Both “Believe” and “New Taste” featured in the Top 10 (industrial/metal/new wave) on www.Mp3.com

In July 2000 VIE struck a deal with V&R distribution which made “Chinese Pornography” available in Best Buy stores across the United States.

Track listing: 1. New Taste
2. Injected
3. Nothing
4. Ass+Fuck=57
5. Believe
6. Fragile

=== White Box Therapy ===
Victims in Ecstacy spent most of 2001 at Sound Vision studios recording what was to be their second album, “White Box Therapy”, with producer/engineer Michael Beck. White Box Therapy was released in March 2002. This album saw Andy Gerold assume the position of drummer with Ken Bergeron taking over guitar duties.

Track listing:

1. Euphoria
2. Cold Again
3. Atmospheric Textures
4. sdrawkcaB
5. New Taste
6. Beautiful
7. untitled
8. White Box Therapy (Heroine)
9. White Box Therapy (Radio Edit)

=== Tribute albums ===
Victims In Ecstacy featured on two tribute albums.
They appeared on “Mutations: A Tribute to Alice Cooper” where they did a version of “Welcome to My Nightmare” and on “Tribute of the Year: A Tribute to Faith No More” where they covered “Strip Search”.

== Media ==
November 2001 saw them line up a sponsorship deal with Pepsi, which ran the song "New Taste" on radio ads for the company's energy drink Amp.

== Live performances ==
VIE performed regularly at the Atomic Cafe in Phoenix. They performed at the opening of Phoenix club The Machine and while recording their second album, White Box Therapy, they were invited to play on the Preaching to the Perverted tour along with Pigface, Gravity Kills and Godhead.

VIE have also shared the stage with bands such as Linkin Park, Disturbed, KMFDM, Alien Ant Farm, Sinnistar, Guttermouth, Jack Off Jill, Life of Agony, The Genitorturers, Psychotica, Dope, Drain STH, Vanilla Ice, Pitchshifter, Primer55 and Switchblade Symphony.

On June 24, 2001, their concert was webcast by Hollywoodmusic.com.

== Awards ==
1998 - New Times Showcase Award for “Best Industrial Band”
2000 – New Times Showcase Award for “Most Likely to Make it Big”
2001 – New Times Showcase Award for “Best Hard/Modern Rock”
2001 – New Times Showcase Award for “Most Likely to Make it Big”
2001 – Aim Award for “Best Fashion”

== Band members ==
- Jim Louvau– lead vocals
- Andy Gerold– guitar, drums
- Jim Kaufmann– guitar
- Jared Bakin– bass, guitar
- Ken Bergeron (credited as Ken Virii on Chinese Pornography) – bass, guitar
- Danny Diaz – drums
