= Black Rivers Flow =

Studio album by Lazarus A.D.
- Released: February 1, 2011
- Recorded: July–August 2010
- Genre: Groove metal, thrash metal
- Length: 41:48
- Label: Metal Blade
- Producer: Chris Djuricic, James Murphy

Lazarus A.D. chronology
The Onslaught (2007)	Black Rivers Flow (2011)

Black Rivers Flow is the second album by American heavy metal band Lazarus A.D.

== Critical reception ==
Professional ratings
Review scores
Source	Rating
AllMusic	4/5 stars
Blabbermouth.net	8/10 stars

Critical reception was positive towards the album, usually rating it as similarly or just below 2007's The Onslaught.

AllMusic noted the band's change of genre from retro-thrash to groove metal, but praised it as an equally effective blend of music. While a lack of originality is suggested, the catchiness and slowed down riffs are both praised.

Blabbermouth.net praised their change in style as making every song stand out without any evident weakness, particularly commenting on their "bigger hooks and every ounce of the aggression".

As with other reviews, Keith Carman of Exclaim! was appreciative of the new style, suggesting hints of Metallica, Pantera, Death Angel and Ozzy Osbourne, making the "album ride a strangely attractive line between sounding entirely new yet being eerily familiar and aged". Carman did argue that too many songs followed the same pace and that additional changes of rhythm would be beneficial – particularly as those few examples that did involve pace changes were amongst the best the album had to offer.

== Track listing ==
All music by Lazarus A.D.

No.	Title	Length
1.	"American Dreams"	4:54
2.	"The Ultimate Sacrifice"	4:54
3.	"The Strong Prevail"	3:04
4.	"Black Rivers Flow"	4:53
5.	"Casting Forward"	3:57
6.	"Light a City (Up in Smoke)"	3:49
7.	"Through Your Eyes"	4:10
8.	"Beneath the Waves of Hatred"	5:05
9.	"Eternal Vengeance"	7:03
Total length:		41:48

== Personnel ==
- Jeff Paulick – vocals, bass
- Dan Gapen – lead guitar, vocals
- Alex Lackner – guitars
- Ryan Shutler – drums

== Charts ==
Chart performance for Black Rivers Flow
Chart (2011)	Peak position
US Heatseekers Albums (Billboard)	35
