= Black Faith =

Studio album by Cancer
- Released: 1995
- Recorded: Great Linford Studios; Milton Keynes
- Genre: Groove metal, industrial metal
- Length: 46:50
- Label: East West
- Producer: Simon Efemey

Cancer chronology
The Sins of Mankind (1994)	Black Faith (1995)	Corporation$ (2004)

Black Faith is the fourth album by British death metal band Cancer. It was released in 1995 by East West and distributed worldwide. The record received decidedly mixed reviews; some compared the Black Faith material to mid-period Metallica, whilst others considered it a "poor man's Heartwork".

== Track listing ==
- All Songs Written by Cancer, except where noted.
1. "Ants (Nemesis Ride)" 4:59
2. "Who Do You Think You Are" 4:38
3. "Face To Face" 3:52
4. "Without Cause" 6:10
5. "White Desire" 3:08
6. "Kill Date" 4:15
7. "Temple Song" 2:32
8. "Black Faith" 3:15
9. "Highest Orders" 4:43
10. "Space Truckin'" (Deep Purple cover; written by Ian Gillan, Ritchie Blackmore, Jon Lord, Roger Glover & Ian Paice) 4:31
11. "Sunburnt" 1:23
12. "Save Me From Myself" 3:27

== Personnel ==
- John Walker: Acoustic & Rhythm Guitars, Vocal
- Barry Savage: Lead Guitars
- Ian Buchanan: Bass
- Carl Stokes: Drums, Percussion
