= The Accuser (album) =

Studio album by Abigail Williams
- Released: October 30, 2015
- Genre: Black metal
- Length: 45:37
- Label: Candlelight
- Producer: Ken Sorceron

Abigail Williams chronology
| Becoming (2012) | The Accuser (2015) | Walk Beyond the Dark (2019) |

Professional ratings
Review scores
| Source | Rating |
|---|---|
| AllMusic | 4/5 stars |
| Louder Sound | 4/5 stars |
| Maximum Volume Music | 8.5/10 |

The Accuser is the fourth album by American black metal band Abigail Williams. It was released on October 30, 2015, via Candlelight Records, and features a one-time lineup that includes guitarist Jeff Wilson, drummer Charlie Fell, and bassist Will Lindsay, along with additional vocals by Neill Jameson. Cover art was made by Stevie Floyd.

== Critical reception ==
The album was met with highly positive reviews. A reviewer in Metal Injection stated, "If you’ve had issue with Abigail Williams in the past (albeit their generic Dimmu Borgir worship or their deathcore days) don’t let that stop you from listening to what is actually a fantastically composed album. The Accuser stands as my favorite incarnation of the band’s material. The old school mentality gives the band a serious edge, though their still not without modern influence in the post metal world (we’re “post” everything these days, aren't we?). Those that love Gorgoroth and Emperor, but can stand to see flashes of bands like Pelican in their black metal take note and get on this one."

Andy Synn of No Clean Singing explained in his review, "Where Becoming built up slowly, rising towards the point of eruption, The Accuser burns hard right from the start, but burns itself down to the bone in the process. It’s a simple but effective shift in approach, but one that was definitely the right move to make, simultaneously sidestepping accusations of trend-chasing whilst also refusing to be boxed in or stagnate in one place, and right now I’m struggling to decide between Becoming and The Accuser as to which is the better album..."

Joseph Collins of CVLT Nation concluded his review by saying "that Ken Sorceron and his new compatriots have achieved the vision they were going for when they united under the banner of Abigail Williams. The days of metal-core breakdowns and dark tributes to symphonic Black Metal are gone. The Accuser sounds like a totally different project, one that has been forged and tempered in isolation and suffocating despair. While admittingly, it does borrow a bit from the sound of more bench-marked projects, it still has the balls and chops to stand up alongside other projects within the extreme metal scene, particularly the always “tolerant and open-minded” American and European Black Metal scene."

== Track listing ==
| No. | Title | Length |
|---|---|---|
| 1. | "Path of Broken Glass" | 5:33 |
| 2. | "The Cold Lines" | 3:48 |
| 3. | "Of the Outer Darkness" | 7:12 |
| 4. | "Will, Wish and Desire" | 5:58 |
| 5. | "Godhead" | 7:12 |
| 6. | "Forever Kingdom of Dirt" | 6:42 |
| 7. | "Lost Communion" | 4:04 |
| 8. | "Nuummite" | 5:08 |
| Total length: | | 45:37 |

== Personnel ==
=== Abigail Williams ===
- Ken Sorceron – guitars, lead vocals, drums, keyboards
- Jeff Wilson – guitars, keyboards
- Will Lindsay – bass
- Charlie Fell – drums, bass, backing vocals

=== Guest musicians ===
- Neill Jameson – additional vocals

=== Production ===
- Ken Sorceron – production
- Stevie Floyd – cover art
