= Grand Morbid Funeral =

Studio album by Bloodbath
- Released: 17 November 2014
- Recorded: March–September 2014
- Studio: Ghost Ward Studio; City of Glass Studio
- Genre: Death metal
- Length: 46:31
- Label: Peaceville
- Producer: Bloodbath

Bloodbath chronology
| The Fathomless Mastery (2008) | Grand Morbid Funeral (2014) | The Arrow of Satan Is Drawn (2018) |

Grand Morbid Funeral is the fourth studio album by Swedish death metal band Bloodbath. It was released by Peaceville Records on 17 November 2014.

== Background ==
Grand Morbid Funeral was recorded in 2014 at Ghost Ward and City of Glass in Stockholm, Sweden and self-produced by the band. It was released on 17 November 2014 by Peaceville Records. This is the first Bloodbath album to feature vocalist Nick Holmes from UK metal band Paradise Lost after Mikael Åkerfeldt of Opeth left, having lost interest in performing death metal. Anders "Blakkheim" Nystrom of the band states that the album is "destructive, raw, heavy, organic and sludgy death metal."

The album features guest appearances from Chris Reifert and Eric Cutler from death metal band Autopsy.

== Critical reception ==
Professional ratings
Review scores
| Source | Rating |
|---|---|
| Blabbermouth | 8.5/10 |
| MetalSucks | 4/5 stars |
| Exclaim! | 8/10 |

Blabbermouth described the "unapologetic fury" of Grand Morbid Funeral and stated that the album "brings the same old-school, brutalized death metal Bloodbath has been hailed for". MetalSucks commented that new singer "Holmes' voice is just the worm-gut-strewn axe-to-the-skull this music needs" and stated that "if you've spent most of 2014 waiting around to get leveled by a death metal record with a little legacy heft, you might want to get out there and snatch up the new Bloodbath". The review in Exclaim! stated that "Bloodbath have upped the brutality ante with Grand Morbid Funeral" and claimed that Holmes has "surpassed expectations with powerful and sinister throat-gurgling delivery".

== Track listing ==
All tracks are written by Bloodbath

| No. | Title | Writer(s) | Length |
|---|---|---|---|
| 1. | "Let the Stillborn Come to Me" | Jonas Renkse | 4:37 |
| 2. | "Total Death Exhumed" | Anders Nyström | 3:51 |
| 3. | "Anne" | Per Eriksson | 3:43 |
| 4. | "Church of Vastitas" | Renkse | 3:37 |
| 5. | "Famine of God's Word" | Eriksson | 4:56 |
| 6. | "Mental Abortion" | Renkse | 3:47 |
| 7. | "Beyond Cremation" | Nick Holmes, Nyström | 4:41 |
| 8. | "His Infernal Necropsy" | Renkse | 3:35 |
| 9. | "Unite in Pain" | Holmes, Nyström | 3:52 |
| 10. | "My Torturer" | Eriksson | 4:17 |
| 11. | "Grand Morbid Funeral" | Nyström | 5:35 |
| Total length: | | | 46:31 |

== Personnel ==
Names given as credited in album credits (real names in brackets).

=== Bloodbath ===
- Old Nick – vocals
- Blakkheim – guitars, backing vocals
- Sodomizer – guitars
- Lord Seth – bass guitar
- Axe – drums

=== Guest musicians ===
- Chris Reifert – guest vocals on "Grand Morbid Funeral"
- Eric Cutler – guitar solos on "Total Death Exhumed", "Mental Abortion" and "Unite in Pain"
- Nothing – guest solo on "My Torturer"

=== Additional credits ===
- Thomas Eberger – mastering
- Néstor Ávalos – artwork
- David Castillo – mixing
