= Death Shall Rise =

Studio album by Cancer
- Released: 24 May 1991
- Recorded: Morrisound Recording, Tampa, Florida
- Genres: Death metal, grindcore thrash metal
- Length: 36:02
- Label: Vinyl Solution
- Producers: Scott Burns and Cancer

Cancer chronology
To the Gory End (1990)	Death Shall Rise (1991)	The Sins of Mankind (1993)

Professional ratings
Review scores
Source	Rating
AllMusic	4.5/5 stars

Death Shall Rise is the second album by British death metal band Cancer. It was released on 24 May 1991 through Vinyl Solution.

== Reception ==
AllMusic gave the album four and a half stars out of five and called the music "intriguing".

== Track listing ==
All tracks are written by Cancer.

No.	Title	Length
1.	"Hung, Drawn and Quartered"	3:25
2.	"Tasteless Incest"	4:54
3.	"Burning Casket"	4:02
4.	"Death Shall Rise"	5:44
5.	"Back from the Dead"	4:59
6.	"Gruesome Tasks"	4:32
7.	"Corpse Fire"	2:33
8.	"Internal Decay"	5:53
Total length:		36:02

== Personnel ==
Cancer

- James Murphy – lead guitar
- Carl Stokes – drums
- John Walker – vocals, guitar
- Ian Buchanan – bass

Guest musician

- Glen Benton – backing vocals on "Hung, Drawn and Quartered"

Production

- John "The Don" Dent – mastering
- Tim Hubbard – photography
- Junior Tomlin – cover art
- Scott Burns – producer
- Mike Marsh – mastering
