= Threatin =

American rock band

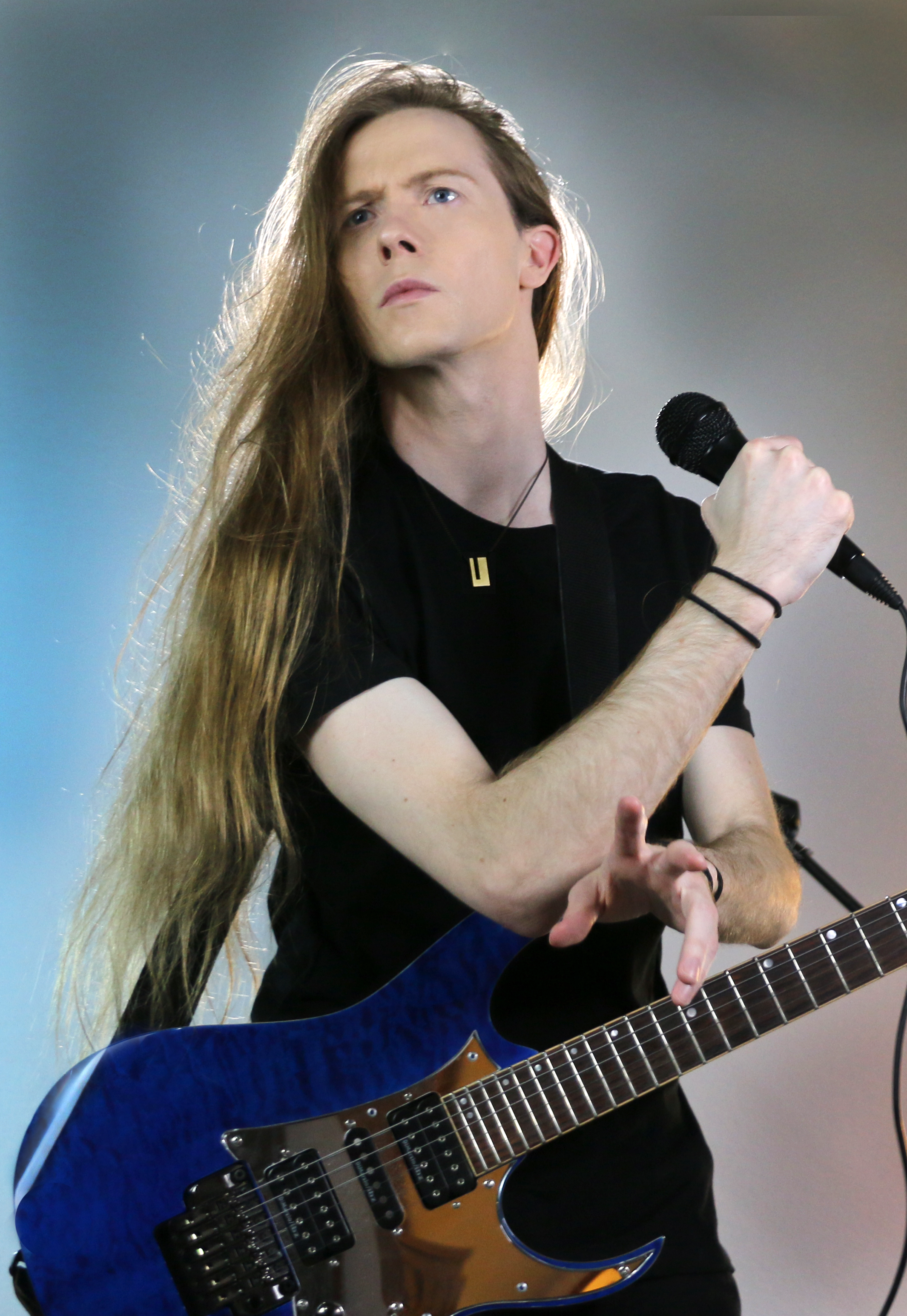
- Jered Threatin in 2015

Background information
- Origin: Los Angeles, California, U.S.
- Genres: Heavy metal; glam metal; hard rock
- Years active: 2012–present
- Members: Jered Threatin
- Website: threatin.com

Threatin is an American rock band from Los Angeles. A solo project of Jered Eames under the stage name Jered Threatin, the band gained notoriety in November 2018 for a European tour in which it played to mostly empty venues. Threatin has been called a fake band by the music press, and described as a vanity project of its founder. Rolling Stone also referred to Threatin as a "great heavy metal hoax".

== History ==
=== 2012–2017: Formation ===
Jered Eames was born in Moberly, Missouri. He formed the black metal band Saetith there with his older brother Scott. The band eventually imploded due to the clash of personality between the brothers; Scott Eames would eventually go on to play with Nile and Vital Remains.

Following the break up of Saetith and a brief period with Abigail Williams, he moved to California in 2012 and began the band Threatin as a solo project, for which he adopted the name Jered Threatin. In 2015, Threatin released a single, "Living Is Dying". In 2017, the album Breaking the World was released, with Jered Threatin performing all instruments.

=== 2018: Tour incidents ===
In November 2018, Threatin embarked on a United Kingdom tour, but the shows had sparse audiences; venues claimed they had been told that hundreds of tickets were purchased, but very few people actually attended. The Camden Underworld in London had been told that 291 advance tickets had been sold, but only three people attended; similarly, 180 tickets had supposedly been sold for the Exchange in Bristol but the band played to an "empty room".

MetalSucks identified Threatin as Eames and identified fake record labels, fake booking companies, and fake management companies that were all registered to the same GoDaddy account; they also discovered that the band had purchased 38,000 of the Facebook likes it claimed to have received from fans. Threatin's backing guitarist Joe Prunera and drummer Dane Davis left the band midway through the tour.

Threatin claimed the incident was an elaborate hoax he had orchestrated, but his brother publicly disavowed the statement. Threatin claimed to have sent emails to reporters on the first day of the tour to build controversy, but his claim was later proven false by the BBC, who found that the emails in question were sent after the tour had already failed.

In May 2019, it was revealed that Joe Prunera, Dane Davis, and Davis's mother Debra had all sued Eames and his business partner for costs accrued during the UK tour. Neither defendant attended the hearings, as Prunera was awarded $10,000 plus $250 in court fees, Dane Davis was awarded $3,975.29, and Debra Davis was awarded $4,035.66. Notices sent to Eames regarding the judgement were returned to the court, and the court had reportedly been unable to contact him.

=== 2019: Return to live performances ===
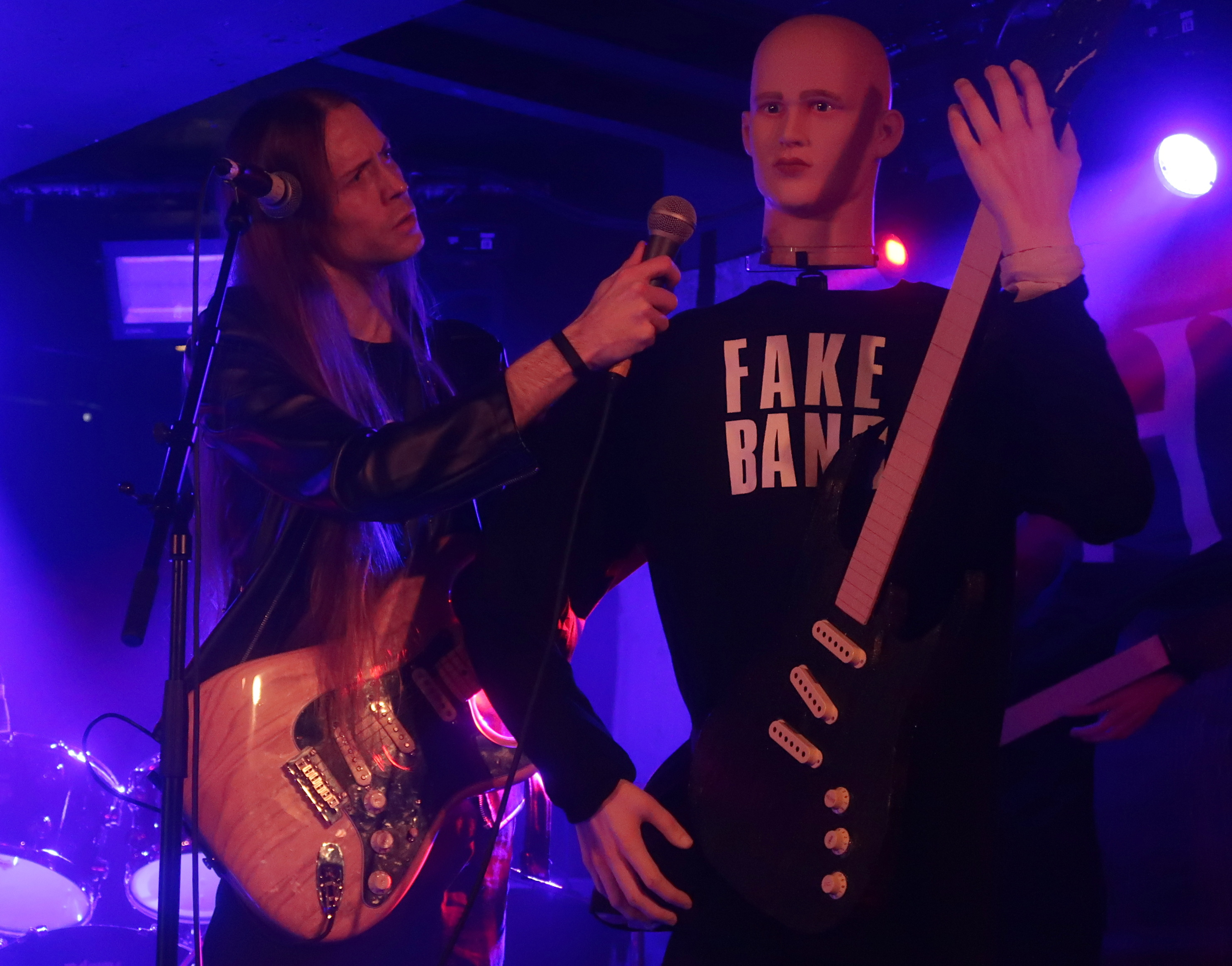
Threatin (left) in 2019

Jered Threatin returned to play the Camden Underworld in London on November 1, 2019. Prior to the event, manager Jon Vyner stated: "We'll probably promote it in-house. Last time there was no one to promote him—because he had no fans at the time. Now he does." Threatin's return show to the Camden Underworld featured robotic mannequins dressed in T-shirts with "Fake Band" printed on them. Threatin regularly handed his microphone to one of the mannequins to "sing" his lyrics on a backing track. Other stage spectacles included Threatin pretending to be fellated by a blow-up doll wearing a BBC News T-shirt, before ending the show by smashing his guitar. A maximum of 60 people were reported to have attended, with a significant number leaving before the end of the 45-minute show.

=== 2019–2026: Hiatus, new album and alleged life-threatening illness ===
Between late 2019 and early 2025, Threatin made no updates, interviews or live appearances.

In 2025, Threatin announced a new single, Die Young, along with the revelation that he suffered a number of heart attacks, and underwent emergency open-heart surgery, as a result of his pulmonary arteriovenous malformation. Public reaction was mixed with many not believing him and suggesting it may just be another faked PR stunt similar to the 2018 tour incident.

According to Threatin's website; his second studio album has been mastered at Abbey Road Studios and is expected to be released alongside a full length documentary about the band.

On 30 July 2026, Threatin released The Shadow Box, the second track of the upcoming second studio album entitled The Meaning of it All.

== Members ==
Current members

- Jered Threatin – all vocals and instruments (2012–present)

Former touring musicians

- Gavin Carney – bass guitar (2018)
- Joe Prunera – guitar (2018)
- Dane Davis – drums (2018)

== Discography ==
- Breaking the World (2017)
