= World Under Blood =

American melodic death metal band

- World Under Blood's original lineup, from left to right: Deron Miller, Luke Jaeger, Risha Eryavec, and Tim Yeung.

Background information
- Origin: Los Angeles, California
- Genres: Melodic death metal, technical death metal
- Years active: 2006–present
- Label: Nuclear Blast
- Members: Deron Miller; Luke Jaeger; Kyle Konkiel; Mike Heller
- Past members: Tim Yeung; Risha Eryavac

World Under Blood is an American extreme metal band from Los Angeles, California. Formed in 2006, the band originally featured vocalist and guitarist Deron Miller and drummer Tim Yeung, with bassist Risha Eryavac and guitarist Luke Jaeger completing the four-piece lineup in 2007. The group released its debut album Tactical in July 2011, which featured contributions from guitarist James Murphy.

Following the release of the album, Eryavac and Yeung left World Under Blood, to be replaced by current bassist and drummer Kyle Konkiel and Mike Heller, respectively. However, since 2012 the band has remained largely inactive, due in part to Miller's return to focus on his other bands, CKY and Foreign Objects, as well as the busy schedules of other band members.

== History ==
=== 2006–2009: Early years and demos ===
The formation of World Under Blood was officially announced in October 2006 by vocalist and guitarist Deron Miller, who revealed to music news website Blabbermouth.net that he was working with drummer Tim Yeung, producer and engineer Logan Mader, and guitarist and mixing engineer James Murphy on the project. Describing the style of the band, Miller explained that the songs he had written for World Under Blood constituted "the most honest and brutal material [he'd] ever written". By the following month, the band's frontman revealed that a three-song demo was nearing completion, and would feature tracks named "Under the Autumn Low", "God Among the Waste", and "Dead and Still in Pain".

World Under Blood released its first recording, "Dead and Still in Pain", on its MySpace page on November 29, 2006. After a few months of inactivity, "A God Among the Waste", was released in March 2007, which was eventually followed by the final of the three revealed tracks, "Under the Autumn Low", in September. In June 2007, it was revealed that Decrepit Birth bassist Risha Eryavac had joined the band, and it was later announced that Sleep Terror guitarist Luke Jaeger would complete the group's lineup. World Under Blood returned to the studio in April 2008 to record four new tracks for its debut album, including a cover version of Megadeth's "Wake Up Dead".

=== 2009–present: Tactical and future ===
After more than a year of no updates (due to Miller's return to CKY to record Carver City), in May 2009 it was revealed that World Under Blood had signed with German heavy metal record label Nuclear Blast Records. The band continued working on its debut album throughout 2009 and 2010, with a tentative release date of July 2010 originally scheduled. The track listing for the album, titled Tactical, was revealed in February 2010, and by March it was noted that recording for the release had been completed. As Miller had returned to working with CKY again, for the album B-Sides & Rarities, the release of Tactical was pushed back to July 2011. Upon its release, the album sold around 900 copies in the United States in its first week, reaching number 32 on the Billboard Top Heatseekers chart.

In September 2011, it was revealed that Eryavac had been replaced by former In This Moment bassist Kyle Konkiel, and that Yeung had also left the band, with a replacement drummer yet to be appointed. Yeung's replacement was revealed in the form of Malignancy drummer Mike Heller in March 2012. The band released a music video for Tactical track "Into the Arms of Cruelty" in September 2012. In 2013 it was claimed that the band would be releasing its second album, titled Tetanus Invasive, although as of 2018 this has yet to be released.

In a 2015 interview, Miller stated that he was working on a number of new World Under Blood tracks, indicating that he intended to record an album before the end of the year. The following year, Miller revealed that the band would be working on two albums in 2016: Life Is Too Long to Like You, which he described as "a therapeutic death metal record; dead serious, with a touch of dark humor", and Tetanus Invasive, on which he claimed he was hoping Yeung, Jaeger and Eryavec would perform.

== Style and songwriting ==
Upon the completion of World Under Blood's debut album, frontman Deron Miller explained that the intention of the band was to create "super-fast, extremely brutal and harsh, catchy, melodic, and occasionally offensive and disturbing" music. To this end, he has also praised the individual members of the group, stating that each band member brought something to the project in order to make Tactical "as sickening and dispicable [sic] as possible". Guitarist and producer James Murphy claimed that the band "bridge[s] a gap between genres that has never been bridged ... fusing brutal, blasting death metal with a melodic American rock vibe".

On Tactical, all songwriting is credited to Miller alone, with Yeung assisting with the songs' arrangements. The lyrics on the album deal with a number of different topics, including mental disorders ("Pyro-Compulsive", "Dead and Still in Pain" and "Under the Autumn Low"), politics ("A God Among the Waste"), child abuse ("Into the Arms of Cruelty"), crime and punishment ("Purgatory Dormitory"), religion ("I Can't Stand His Name") and cancer ("Revere's Tears").

== Band members ==
Current members

- Deron Miller – vocals, guitar, bass, keyboards (2006–present)
- Luke Jaeger – lead guitar (2007–present)
- Kyle Konkiel – bass (2011–present)
- Mike Heller – drums (2012–present)

Former members

- Tim Yeung – drums, keyboards (2006–2011)
- Risha Eryavac – bass (2007–2011)

== Discography ==
- Tactical (2011)
