= Walk Beyond the Dark =

2019 metal album by Abigail Williams

Studio album by Abigail Williams
- Released: November 15, 2019
- Genre: Atmospheric black metal
- Length: 55:44
- Label: Blood Music
- Producer: Ken Sorceron

Abigail Williams chronology
| The Accuser (2015) | Walk Beyond the Dark (2019) |

Singles from Walk Beyond the Dark
- 1. "I Will Depart" Released: September 17, 2019; 2. "Ever So Bold" Released: October 15, 2019

Walk Beyond the Dark is the fifth album by American black metal band Abigail Williams, released November 15, 2019, via Blood Music. The album has been considered atmospheric black metal. Singles include "I Will Depart", released September 17, 2019, and "Ever So Bold", released October 15, 2019.

== Background ==
For some time after the band's previous album The Accuser, founder Ken Sorceron was the vocalist for technical death metal band The Faceless. On March 19, 2018, he announced his departure from The Faceless to work on the next Abigail Williams album. Also leaving the band was drummer Bryce Butler, who later become a live drummer for Abigail Williams, and guitarist Justin McKinney, who would contribute a guitar solo to the Abigail Williams single "Ever So Bold".

The first single from the new album, "I Will Depart", was released on September 17, 2019.

== Touring ==
In support of the album, Abigail Williams embarked on the Path to Victory North American tour with bands Ensiferum, Kalmah, and Aenimus in November and December 2019.

Abigail Williams was also announced to be part of the Devastation on the Nation North American tour with bands Rotting Christ, Borknagar, Wolfheart, and Imperial Triumphant in March and April 2020. However, the tour was postponed to February and March 2021, due to the COVID-19 pandemic.

== Critical reception ==
Metal Injection included "I Will Depart" on their list of the Top Tracks of the Week the week Walk Beyond Dark was released.

Louder Sound's Alice Pattillo highlighted how the album as a whole contains "a blend of raw, frost bitten true Norwegian black metal, Dimmu Borgir shaped symphonic elements, Gothenburg-styled death metal grooves and doomy atmospherics." Pattilo further noted that the first single, "I Will Depart", is a "stunning testament to the band's legacy, an epic eight-minute journey through blackened terrain from the viseral, gritty black metal intro to the vast icy tundras of its choral interludes." They compared the track to "contemporary Darkthrone, old school Dimmu, Carpathian Forest and other black metal heavyweights to create a sound that is entirely its own."

Andy Synn of No Clean Singing explained in his review,

All of these tracks [...] display a level of musicality we perhaps haven’t seen from the band since… possibly ever… much of which must be attributed to the intricate bass work and complex percussive patterns provided by Bryan O’Sullivan (From the Bogs of Aughiska, ex-Altar of Plagues) and Mike Heller (Malignancy, Fear Factory), respectively, with Heller in particular giving what may well be a career-best performance behind the kit. Sorceron too, perhaps inspired by his chosen collaborators, seems more energised than ever, especially vocally, mingling his acrid, acid-drenched snarls with deft touches of clean-sung melody in order to maximise the cathartic impact of every single song.

== Track listing ==
| No. | Title | Length |
|---|---|---|
| 1. | "I Will Depart" | 8:02 |
| 2. | "Sun and Moon" | 6:56 |
| 3. | "Ever So Bold" | 4:06 |
| 4. | "Black Waves" | 10:43 |
| 5. | "Into the Sleep" | 5:42 |
| 6. | "Born of Nothing" | 9:15 |
| 7. | "The Final Failure" | 11:00 |
| Total length: | | 55:44 |

== Personnel ==
=== Abigail Williams ===
- Ken Sorceron – vocals, guitars, drums, keyboards

=== Session members ===
- Bryan O' Sullivan – bass
- Mike Heller – drums
- Chris "Kakophonix" Brown – cello

=== Guest musicians ===
- Andrew Markuszewski – additional guitars (tracks 1 and 2)
- Justin McKinney – additional guitars (track 3)

=== Production ===
- Ken Sorceron – producer
- Mariusz Lewandowski – cover art
