= Dreams of the Carrion Kind =

Studio album by Disincarnate
- Released: March 23, 1993
- Genre: Technical death metal
- Length: 47:45
- Label: Roadrunner
- Producer: Colin Richardson

Dreams of the Carrion Kind is an album released by American death metal guitarist James Murphy, under the band name Disincarnate. It was released in 1993.

Dreams of the Carrion Kind was Disincarnate's only album; it was released in 1993, near the zenith of the Florida death metal scene, through Roadrunner Records. It was reissued on February 24, 2004 with bonus tracks.

== Music ==
Most of the album's tracks feature complex structures and constant riff and tempo changes. The bass guitar is nearly inaudible. Dreams of the Carrion Kind displays riffs that Murphy intended to use for the songwriting process of Obituary's sophomore album, Cause of Death.

== Critical reception ==
Professional ratings
Review scores
Source	Rating
Allmusic	4.5/5 stars

Eduardo Rivadavia from Allmusic gave the album 4.5 stars of 5 calling it "state-of-the-art death metal in the eyes of most enthusiasts of the genre." He particularly praised the songs "Stench of Paradise Burning," "Beyond the Flesh," "Soul Erosion," "Deadspawn," and "Confine of Shadows." According to him the records' apparent intellectual demands invariably restrict Dreams of the Carrion Kind to a very specific fan base and point in time.

== Track listing ==
All lyrics are written by Bryan Cegon.

Original
No.	Title	Music	Length
1.	"De Profundis (Intro)"	Cegon, James Murphy	0:45
2.	"Stench of Paradise Burning"	Cegon, Murphy	4:50
3.	"Beyond the Flesh"	Jason Carman, Cegon, Murphy	4:47
4.	"In Sufferance"	Carman, Cegon, Murphy	4:56
5.	"Monarch of the Sleeping Marches"	Carman, Cegon, Murphy	5:03
6.	"Soul Erosion"	Cegon, Murphy	4:40
7.	"Entranced"	Carman, Cegon, Murphy	5:52
8.	"Confine of Shadows"	Cegon, Murphy	5:05
9.	"Deadspawn"	Carman, Cegon, Murphy	4:28
10.	"Sea of Tears"	Cegon, Murphy	5:01
11.	"Immemorial Dream (Outro)"	Cegon, Murphy	2:14

2004 reissue
No.	Title	Music	Length
1.	"De - Profundis (Intro)"	Cegon, Murphy	0:45
2.	"Stench of Paradise Burning"	Cegon, Murphy	4:47
3.	"Beyond the Flesh"	Carman, Cegon, Murphy	4:46
4.	"In Sufferance"	Carman, Cegon, Murphy	4:56
5.	"Monarch of the Sleeping Marches"	Carman, Cegon, Murphy	5:01
6.	"Soul Erosion"	Cegon, Murphy	4:37
7.	"Entranced"	Carman, Cegon, Murphy	5:50
8.	"Confine of Shadows"	Cegon, Murphy	5:02
9.	"Deadspawn"	Carman, Cegon, Murphy	4:27
10.	"Sea of Tears"	Cegon, Murphy	5:01
11.	"Immemorial Dream (Outro)"	Cegon, Murphy	2:15
12.	"Stench of Paradise Burning" (demo)	Murphy	4:52
13.	"Soul Erosion" (demo)	Cegon, Murphy	4:54
14.	"Confine of Shadows" (demo)	Cegon, Murphy	5:19

== Credits ==
Band

- James Murphy – lead, rhythm and acoustic guitars, bass
- Bryan Cegon – vocals
- Jason Carman – rhythm guitar
- Tommy Viator – drums

Additional personnel

- Peter Coleman – keyboards, engineering, sampling
- Chris Gehringer – mastering
- Tim Hubbard – photography
- Dave McKean – artwork, design, illustrations
- Colin Richardson – production, mixing
- Aaron Stainthorpe – vocals (track 5)
- John Walker – vocals
