= Lazarus A.D. =

American thrash metal band

- Origin: Kenosha, Wisconsin, U.S.
- Genres: Thrash metal, groove metal
- Years active: 2005–2015 (hiatus)
- Label: Metal Blade
- Members: Jeff Paulick; Dan Gapen; Alex Lackner
- Past members: Ryan Shutler (deceased)

Lazarus A.D. is an American thrash/groove metal band from Kenosha, Wisconsin, formed as "Lazarus" in 2005. They added the "A.D." to avoid potential legal issues. They released two studio albums, The Onslaught (2007) and Black Rivers Flow (2011). Despite never announcing an official hiatus or disbandment, the band has been mostly inactive since drummer Ryan Shutler died in 2015.

== History ==
In 2007, they self-released their debut album, The Onslaught. The band sent the album to many metal record labels that turned the band down. Later, a song off The Onslaught appeared in a compilation album by Earache Records. Not long after, the album received positive reviews in the underground, and the band signed with Metal Blade Records. The Onslaught was re-released in 2009. Lazarus A.D. toured for a year and a half to promote the reissue, supporting Testament on their Formation of Damnation tour and Kreator on their Hordes of Chaos tour, both in the US. Following that, Lazarus A.D. headlined a US tour, with support by Lightning Swords of Death. During this time, the band shared stages with three of thrash metal's "big four" (Megadeth, Slayer and Anthrax), as well as Judas Priest, Rob Zombie, Exodus, Napalm Death and Kataklysm.

Their second studio album, Black Rivers Flow, was released on February 1, 2011. Lazarus A.D. toured for less than a year to promote the album, supporting Death Angel on their Relentless Retribution tour in the US, followed by a European co-headlining tour with Bonded by Blood, and then returning to the US to open for Cavalera Conspiracy. Drummer Ryan Shutler died suddenly on May 17, 2015 in Sacramento, California. Although no official hiatus or breakup was announced, Lazarus A.D. has been mostly inactive since Shutler's death.

== Musical style ==
Lazarus A.D.'s sound has been described as a mix between thrash and groove metal with elements of traditional heavy metal.

== Members ==
=== Current members ===
- Jeff Paulick – lead vocals, bass (2005–2015)
- Dan Gapen – lead guitar, vocals (2005–2015)
- Alex Lackner – rhythm guitar (2005–2015)

=== Former members ===
- Ryan Shutler – drums (2005–2015; died 2015)

== Discography ==
- Lazarus (demo) (2006)
- The Onslaught (2007)
- Black Rivers Flow (2011)
