= The Fathomless Mastery =

Studio album by Bloodbath
- Released: 6 October 2008
- Recorded: 9 April–August 2008
- Studio: Ghost Ward Studio; Park Studio
- Genre: Death metal
- Length: 41:41
- Label: Peaceville
- Producer: David Castillo; Bloodbath

Bloodbath chronology
The Wacken Carnage (2008)	The Fathomless Mastery (2008)	Bloodbath over Bloodstock (2011)

The Fathomless Mastery is the third full-length album by Swedish death metal band Bloodbath, released on 6 October 2008 via Peaceville. It is the band's last studio album to feature vocalist Mikael Åkerfeldt and the first to feature lead guitarist Per Eriksson. A video was made for "Hades Rising", directed by Owe Lingwall and shot on location in Vallentuna, near Stockholm. The album peaked at No. 45 on the Heatseekers Chart in the US on release.

The album was reissued in 2011, bundled together with the tracks from the Unblessing the Purity EP released in 2008.

== Background ==
Former Scar Symmetry vocalist Christian Älvestam performed guest vocals on the sixth track, "Iesous".

The outro of the final track, "Wretched Human Mirror", features samples from the movie I Am Legend.

== Track listing ==
No.	Title	Lyrics	Music	Length
1.	"At the Behest of Their Death"	Anders 'Blakkheim' Nyström	Nyström	3:41
2.	"Process of Disillumination"	Jonas Renkse	Renkse	3:09
3.	"Slaughtering the Will to Live"	Renkse	Renkse	3:37
4.	"Mock the Cross"	Mikael Åkerfeldt	Per 'Sodomizer' Eriksson	4:02
5.	"Treasonous"	Nyström	Nyström	4:13
6.	"Iesous" (featuring Christian Älvestam)	Renkse	Renkse	3:34
7.	"Drink from the Cup of Heresy"	Åkerfeldt	Eriksson	3:37
8.	"Devouring the Feeble"	Renkse	Renkse	3:11
9.	"Earthrot"	Åkerfeldt	Eriksson	3:20
10.	"Hades Rising"	Nyström	Nyström	5:05
11.	"Wretched Human Mirror"	Renkse	Renkse	4:12
Total length:				41:41

Unblessing the Purity EP - 2011 reissue bonus tracks
No.	Title	Length
12.	"Blasting the Virginborn"	3:33
13.	"Weak Aside"	4:15
14.	"Sick Salvation"	3:21
15.	"Mouth of Empty Praise"	4:32
Total length:		57:22

== Personnel ==
=== Bloodbath ===
- Mikael Åkerfeldt – vocals
- Anders Nyström – rhythm guitar
- Jonas Renkse – bass
- Martin Axenrot – drums
- Per Eriksson – lead guitar

=== Additional musician ===
- Christian Älvestam – guest vocals (on "Iesous")

=== Production and design ===
- Bloodbath - production
- David Castillo - production, engineering, mixing
- Björn Engelmann - mastering
- Dusty Peterson - artwork
- Robin Bergh - photography (band)

== Reception ==
Professional ratings
Review scores
Source	Rating
About.com	4/5 stars
Blabbermouth.net	8.5/10
Terrorizer	7.5/10 stars
