= To the Gory End =

Studio album by Cancer
- Released: 15 May 1990
- Recorded: Winter 1989 at Loco Studios
- Genres: Death metal; thrash metal
- Length: 34:59
- Label: Vinyl Solution
- Producer: Scott Burns

Cancer chronology
To the Gory End (1990)	Death Shall Rise (1991)

Professional ratings
Review scores
Source	Rating
Kerrang!	4/5 stars
Metal Hammer	4/5 stars

To the Gory End is the first album by British death metal band Cancer. The cover artwork was censored in some countries, with only the band's name and album title left on a black background. The image is a painting based on a promotional still for the 1978 horror film, Dawn of the Dead.

== Track listing ==
No.	Title	Length
1.	"Blood Bath"	3:29
2.	"C.F.C."	2:58
3.	"Witch Hunt"	2:53
4.	"Into the Acid"	2:33
5.	"Imminent Catastrophe"	5:30
6.	"To the Gory End"	4:45
7.	"Body Count"	3:39
8.	"Sentenced"	4:05
9.	"Die Die"	4:49
Total length:		34:59

2008 reissue on Riat! Entertainment and Rip Death Records bonus track
No.	Title	Length
10.	"Blood Bath" (Live)

2008 CD reissue on Gold Records bonus tracks
No.	Title	Length
10.	"Intro"
11.	"Body Count"
12.	"Into the Acid"
13.	"Sentenced to the Gallows"
14.	"Gruesome Tasks"
15.	"Imminent Catastrophe"
16.	"C.F.C."
17.	"Blood Bath"
18.	"Witch Hunt"

- Tracks recorded live at Wrexham Memorial Hall, August 31, 1990.

== Personnel ==
Cancer

- John Walker - vocals, guitars
- Ian Buchanan - bass
- Carl Stokes - drums

Additional musicians

- John Tardy - Backing Vocals on "Die Die"
- Tim Lewis - Keyboards on "Die Die" and "To the Gory End"

Production

- Scott Burns - Mixing, Producer
- Carl Stokes - Cover art
- Phil Higgins - Photography
- Tim Lewis - Engineering
