= Becoming (Abigail Williams album) =

Studio album by Abigail Williams
- Released: January 24, 2012
- Genre: Black metal
- Length: 55:06
- Label: Candlelight
- Producer: Ken Sorceron

Abigail Williams chronology
In the Absence of Light (2010)	Becoming (2012)	The Accuser (2015)

Professional ratings
Review scores
Source	Rating
Metal Assault	9.5/10 stars
The New Review	5/5 stars
Thrash Hits	4/6 stars

Becoming is the third album by American black metal band Abigail Williams. It was released on January 24, 2012, via Candlelight Records. The album was met with highly positive reviews. Becoming was initially planned to be the band's final album as they announced their dissolution soon after, but Abigail Williams would later decide to continue.

== Promotion ==
Abigial Williams originally released fliers and studio reports that suggested a new album was in the works. Later, on November 10, 2011, a song entitled "Ascension Sickness" was leaked over YouTube.

== Supporting tour ==
Following a warm-up headlining gig in Trenton, New Jersey, Abigail Williams provided support for Norwegian black metal band Mayhem for a thirty-six date North American tour, also supported by Hate and Keep of Kalessin.

Following the tour with Mayhem, Abigail Williams continued touring through the New Year in support of Becoming, with full stateside tours supporting Dark Funeral and then Deicide.

== Track listing ==
No.	Title	Length
1.	"Ascension Sickness"	11:12
2.	"Radiance"	5:33
3.	"Elestial"	8:12
4.	"Infinite Fields of Mind"	10:11
5.	"Three Days of Darkness"	2:27
6.	"Beyond the Veil"	17:31
Total length:		55:06

Bonus tracks
No.	Title	Length
7.	"Akasha" (iTunes Bonus track)	5:33

== Personnel ==
=== Abigail Williams ===
- Ken Sorceron – all vocals, guitars
- Ian Jekelis – guitars
- Griffin Wotawa – bass guitar
- Zach Gibson – drums

=== Guest musicians ===
- Ashley Ellyllon Jurgenmeyer – keyboards
- Sarah Batgirl Chaffee – cello

=== Production ===
- Ken Sorceron – producer
- Christophe Szpajdel – logo
