= Unblessing the Purity =

EP by Bloodbath
- Released: March 10, 2008
- Recorded: June 2007
- Studio: Fascination Street, Örebro, Sweden
- Genre: Death metal
- Length: 15:38
- Label: Peaceville
- Producer: David Castillo; Bloodbath

Bloodbath chronology
Nightmares Made Flesh (2004)	Unblessing the Purity (2008)	The Wacken Carnage (2008)

Professional ratings
Review scores
Source	Rating
Blabbermouth.net	7.5/10 stars

Unblessing the Purity is the second EP by Swedish death metal band Bloodbath. It was released on March 10, 2008, on Peaceville Records. It is their first release since Resurrection Through Carnage to include Mikael Åkerfeldt on vocals. Per "Sodomizer" Eriksson replaced Dan Swanö on guitar beginning with this EP. The cover art is by Dusty Peterson, who won the band's contest for fan-made cover art. The album is packaged in a super-jewel case with a slipcase cut to fit. Unblessing the Purity is only available directly through mail-order via Peaceville Records or Snapper Music, and digitally.

== Track listing ==
No.	Title	Lyrics	Music	Length
1.	"Blasting the Virginborn"	Renkse	Renkse	3:33
2.	"Weak Aside"	Nyström	Nyström	4:15
3.	"Sick Salvation"	Renkse	Eriksson	3:21
4.	"Mouth of Empty Praise"	Renkse	Eriksson, Renkse	4:32
Total length:				15:38

== Personnel ==
=== Bloodbath ===
- Mikael Åkerfeldt – vocals
- Anders "Blakkheim" Nyström – guitar
- Per "Sodomizer" Eriksson – guitar
- Jonas Renkse – bass
- Martin "Axe" Axenrot – drums
