= The Onslaught =

Studio album by Lazarus A.D.
- Released: April 30, 2007
- Genre: Thrash metal, groove metal
- Length: 43:15
- Label: Metal Blade

Lazarus A.D. chronology
Lazarus (demo) (2003)	The Onslaught (2007)	Black Rivers Flow (2011)

Original cover

Professional ratings
Review scores
Source	Rating
Blabbermouth.net	8/10 stars

The Onslaught is the first studio album by American heavy metal band Lazarus A.D. It was released in 2007 as a self-produced album and re-released through Metal Blade records in 2009.

== Track listing ==
No.	Title	Writer(s)	Length
1.	"Last Breath"	Gapen	4:39
2.	"Thou Shall Not Fear"	Paulick	4:36
3.	"Damnation for the Weak"	Paulick	4:22
4.	"Absolute Power"	Paulick, Gapen	4:25
5.	"The Onslaught Pt. 1 - Revolution"	Paulick, Gapen	5:03
6.	"The Onslaught Pt. 2 - Rebirth"	Paulick, Gapen	4:05
7.	"Lust"	Paulick	4:34
8.	"Forged in Blood"	Paulick	3:51
9.	"Every Word Unheard"	Paulick	3:33
10.	"Who I Really Am"	Gapen	4:03
Total length:			43:15

== Personnel ==
- Jeff Paulick – lead vocals, bass
- Dan Gapen – lead guitar, vocals
- Alex Lackner – rhythm guitar
- Ryan Shutler – drums
