= Legend (Abigail Williams EP) =

EP by Abigail Williams
- Released: October 3, 2006
- Recorded: 2006
- Genre: Symphonic black metal, metalcore
- Length: 21:40
- Label: Candlelight
- Producer: Abigail Williams

Abigail Williams chronology
Legend (2006)	In the Shadow of a Thousand Suns (2008)

Professional ratings
Review scores
Source	Rating
AllMusic	3.5/5 stars

Legend is the debut EP by black metal band Abigail Williams. It was released in October 2006 through Candlelight Records. The EP is noted for its metalcore influences that are abandoned after this release.

Musical critic website AllMusic stated "Legend is best described as death metal/black metal with metalcore influences."

== Track listing ==
No.	Title	Length
1.	"From a Buried Heart"	4:10
2.	"Like Carrion Birds"	3:40
3.	"The Conqueror Wyrm"	4:21
4.	"Watchtower"	5:39
5.	"Procession of the Aeons"	3:47
Total length:		21:40

- "Like Carrion Birds" and "The Conqueror Wyrm" were originally demo tracks that were titled "Swollen Disgust" and "Melquiades (The Great Work)" respectively.
- A re-recorded version of "Watchtower" was released as a digital single in 2009.
- iTunes has mistakenly titled "Watchtower" as "Procession of the Aeons", "Procession of the Aeons" as "The Conqueror Wyrm", and "The Conqeror Wyrm" as "Watchtower".

== Personnel ==
Abigail Williams,

- Ken Sorceron – vocals, guitar
- Bjorn Dannov – guitar
- Brad Riffs – guitar
- Zach Gibson – drums
- Kyle Dickinson – bass guitar
- Ashley "Ellyllon" Jurgemeyer – piano, orchestra, keyboards (tracks 4 & 5)

Production

- Michael Beck – engineering
