= In the Absence of Light =

Studio album by Abigail Williams
- Released: September 29, 2010
- Studio: Conquistador Studios (Cleveland, Ohio)
- Genre: Black metal
- Length: 49:52
- Label: Candlelight
- Producer: Ken Sorceron

Abigail Williams chronology
In the Shadow of a Thousand Suns (2008)	In the Absence of Light (2010)	Becoming (2012)

Professional ratings
Review scores
Source	Rating
AllMusic	3/5 stars
BW&BK	9/10
Lords of Metal	81/100
Metal Hammer (de)	4/7
Thrash Hits	2/6 stars

In the Absence of Light is the second album by black metal band Abigail Williams. The album was released in North America on September 28, 2010. The album moves away from the symphonic black metal sound and keyboard usage featured on In the Shadow of a Thousand Suns to a more standard black metal sound.

== Track listing ==
No.	Title	Length
1.	"Hope the Great Betrayal"	6:44
2.	"Final Destiny of the Gods"	8:16
3.	"The Mysteries That Bind the Flesh"	6:51
4.	"Infernal Divide"	4:59
5.	"In Death Comes the Great Silence"	6:17
6.	"What Hells Await Me"	4:47
7.	"An Echo in Our Legends"	4:59
8.	"Malediction"	6:58

iTunes Bonus track
No.	Title	Length
9.	"Psalm 69" (Ministry cover)	5:36

== Personnel ==
- Ken Sorceron – vocals, guitar, bass, keyboards
- Ian Jekelis – guitar
- Ken Bedene – drums

=== Additional personnel ===
- Christophe Szpajdel – logo
