= Nightmares Made Flesh =

Studio album by Bloodbath
- Released: September 27, 2004
- Recorded: May 2004
- Studio: Fascination Street, Örebro
- Genre: Death metal
- Length: 45:18
- Label: Century Media
- Producer: Jens Bogren; Bloodbath

Bloodbath chronology
Resurrection Through Carnage (2002)	Nightmares Made Flesh (2004)	Unblessing the Purity (2008)

Alternative cover
- LP version

Nightmares Made Flesh is the second album by Swedish death metal band Bloodbath. It was released by Century Media Records on September 27, 2004. It was the band's only album to feature Peter Tägtgren on vocals (who was brought in to replace Mikael Åkerfeldt at the time), as well as the first to feature then-future Opeth drummer Martin Axenrot to replace Dan Swanö as the drummer (with Swanö now playing guitar). This was Swanö's last album with Bloodbath.

The song "The Ascension" appeared on the two-part episode of Viva La Bam when the Margeras go to Europe.

== Reception ==
Professional ratings
Review scores
Source	Rating
AllMusic	4.5/5 stars
Blabbermouth.net	8/10
Exclaim!	favorable
Metal Storm	8.0/10

== Track listing ==
All tracks are written by Bloodbath

No.	Title	Writer(s)	Length
1.	"Cancer of the Soul"	Nyström (music & lyrics), Renkse (lyrics)	3:33
2.	"Brave New Hell"	Swanö	4:02
3.	"Soul Evisceration"	Renkse	3:38
4.	"Outnumbering the Day"	Nyström	3:15
5.	"Feeding the Undead"	Renkse	4:04
6.	"Eaten"	Swanö	4:18
7.	"Bastard Son of God"	Renkse	2:51
8.	"Year of the Cadaver Race"	Nyström	4:33
9.	"The Ascension"	Swanö	3:51
10.	"Draped in Disease"	Nyström	3:59
11.	"Stillborn Saviour"	Swanö	3:39
12.	"Blood Vortex"	Renkse	3:30
Total length:			45:18

Bonus tracks
No.	Title	Lyrics	Music	Length
13.	"Breeding Death" (demo version)	Renkse, Åkerfeldt	Nyström, Renkse	4:21
14.	"Omnious Bloodvomit" (demo version)	Renkse, Åkerfeldt	Nyström, Åkerfeldt	3:38

== Credits ==
Writing, performance and production credits are adapted from the album liner notes.

=== Personnel ===
==== Bloodbath ====
- Peter Tägtgren – lead vocals
- Anders Nyström – guitar, bass, backing vocals
- Dan Swanö – guitar, bass, backing vocals
- Jonas Renkse – guitar, bass, backing vocals
- Martin Axenrot – drums

==== Session musician ====
- Simon Solomon (ex-Witchcraft) – lead guitar

==== Production ====
- Jens Bogren – production, engineering
- Bloodbath – production, engineering
- Henrik Jonsson – mastering

==== Visual art ====
- Agni Kastner – art direction, design
- Andreas Hylthén – photography
- Wes Benscoter – cover

=== Studios ===
- Fascination Street, Örebro, Sweden – recording, mixing (May 2004)
- Masters of Audio, Stockholm, Sweden – mastering
