= Resurrection Through Carnage =

Studio album by Bloodbath
- Released: November 12, 2002
- Recorded: February – May 2002
- Studio: Unisound
- Genre: Death metal
- Length: 40:58
- Label: Century Media
- Producer: Dan Swanö; Bloodbath

Bloodbath chronology
Breeding Death (2000)	Resurrection Through Carnage (2002)	Nightmares Made Flesh (2004)

Professional ratings
Review scores
Source	Rating
Allmusic	4/5 stars

Resurrection Through Carnage is the debut studio album from Swedish death metal group Bloodbath. It was released on November 12, 2002, on Century Media Records. It is the only album to feature Dan Swanö on drums, as he later switched to playing guitar and the last with Mikael Åkerfeldt until his return on The Fathomless Mastery.

== Track listing ==
All tracks are written by Bloodbath

No.	Title	Writer(s)	Length
1.	"Ways to the Grave"	Nyström	4:09
2.	"So You Die"	Swanö	3:19
3.	"Mass Strangulation"	Renkse	3:32
4.	"Death Delirium"	Nyström, Åkerfeldt	5:06
5.	"Buried by the Dead"	Renkse	3:14
6.	"The Soulcollector"	Swanö	3:37
7.	"Bathe in Blood"	Nyström, Renkse	4:11
8.	"Trail of Insects"	Renkse	4:36
9.	"Like Fire"	Swanö	4:34
10.	"Cry My Name"	Swanö	4:40
Total length:			40:58

== Personnel ==
- Mikael Åkerfeldt – vocals
- Anders Nyström – guitar, backing vocals
- Jonas Renkse – bass, backing vocals
- Dan Swanö – drums, backing vocals
