= Cancer (band) =

British extreme metal band

- Origin: Ironbridge, Shropshire, England
- Genres: Death metal; thrash metal
- Years active: 1988–1996; 2003–2006; 2013–present
- Labels: Copro; East West; Restless; Vinyl Solution
- Members: John Walker; Daniel Maganto; Gabriel Valcázar
- Past members: Ian Buchanan; Carl Stokes; James Murphy; Barry Savage; Dave Leitch; Rob Engvikson; Adam Richardson

Cancer are a British extreme metal band formed in Ironbridge, Shropshire, in 1988. Over the course of their career, they have released six full-length albums, including one for major label East West, and broke up twice (in 1996 and 2006). The band reformed in 2013. The band's early material is considered to be "brutal, simplistic death metal" by AllMusic, particularly on their debut To the Gory End. Their second album Death Shall Rise is considered to be a technical improvement over its predecessor.

== History ==
=== Early career and To the Gory End (1988–1990) ===
Drummer Carl Stokes, guitarist John Walker and bassist Ian Buchanan formed Cancer in 1988 in the Tontine public house in Ironbridge, Shropshire. The band put together their first two-track demo, No Fuckin' Cover, at the Pits studio in Birmingham, owned by ex-Starfighters vocalist Steve Burton. The demo was produced by Stevie Young (nephew of AC/DC's Angus Young and Malcolm Young) and engineered by "Big" Mick Hughes (live sound engineer for Metallica). The band began playing live, starting with their first show in Birmingham opening for Bomb Disneyland, and including shows with Bolt Thrower, Cerebral Fix and GBH.

A second demo session was recorded in 1989, followed by the bootleg live album Bloodbath in the Acid, recorded at Wrexham Memorial Hall and pressed on the Headache label. No Fuckin' Cover had earned Cancer a deal with Vinyl Solution, and in Winter 1989 the band recorded their debut album, To the Gory End, over four days at Loco Studios in Usk. The record was mixed by record producer Scott Burns at Morrisound Studios, with backing vocals from John Tardy of Obituary added to the track "Die, Die", and released in April 1990. The band followed it up with tours with Obituary and Deicide.

=== Death Shall Rise and The Sins of Mankind (1991–1993) ===
Cancer started preparing material for their second album at Reel to Reel Studios in Telford with engineer Tony Higley, and in February 1991 flew out to Florida to begin recording Death Shall Rise with Scott Burns at Morrisound. They enlisted guitarist James Murphy of Agent Steel and Obituary, while Deicide's Glen Benton provided backing vocals for lead track "Hung, Drawn and Quartered". Released in April 1991, the album gained some notoriety for being banned in Germany, whose state censorship body considered that the cover art might incite youth-on-youth violence. The album would be placed No. 27 in Terrorizer's Top 40 Death Metal Albums. Throughout May, Cancer toured throughout the UK supported by Unleashed and Desecrator, then returned to US for an appearance at the 1991 Milwaukee Metal Festival and further touring in support of Deicide and Obituary.

James Murphy left the band in December 1991 to form Disincarnate and Barry Savage replaced him. This was followed by further touring throughout the US, Mexico, Israel and Europe. The band recorded their third album, The Sins of Mankind, with Simon Efemey at the Windings in Wrexham in December 1992. Following its release through Vinyl Solution in June 1993, Cancer toured Europe with openers Cerebral Fix. Drummer Stokes's motorbike collided with a British Telecom van, leading the band to recruit Nick Barker (later of Cradle of Filth and Dimmu Borgir) for further live shows.

=== Black Faith and split (1994–1996) ===
In 1994, Cancer left Vinyl Solution to sign to major label East West for worldwide distribution, one of the first death metal bands to do so. They entered Great Linford Studios in Milton Keynes, with Simon Efemey at the helm, to record their fourth effort, Black Faith. The record was mixed at Pink Floyd's Brittania Row Studios. Stokes allegedly using a human thigh bone for percussion on "Temple Song". The record received mixed reviews. Some compared Black Faith to mid-period Metallica, whilst others considered it a "poor man's Heartwork". Following a short European tour with support act Meshuggah, Cancer folded, citing "a lack of faith from certain key individuals in the industry and Major Label Bullshit".

=== Reunion (2013–present) ===
On 12 September 2013, it was announced that the original line-up of Cancer was reuniting to promote their first three albums (To the Gory End, Death Shall Rise and The Sins of Mankind), which would be re-released by Cyclone Empire Records later that year. They were planning to make a number of festival appearances, where they would only play songs from the aforementioned albums.

On 22 September 2015, Cancer revealed on their Facebook page that they were working on new material. In July 2018, they signed to Peaceville Records and would release their then-new album, tentatively titled Shadow Gripped, late in the year. In August 2018, Shadow Gripped was confirmed as the title of the band's first studio album in 13 years, released on 2 November 2018. Their latest studio album, Inverted World, was released on 25 April 2025.

== Members ==
Current line-up

- John Walker – vocals, guitar (1987–1996, 2003–2006, 2013–present)
- Alberto García – guitar (2025-present)
- Daniel Maganto – bass (2022–present)

Past members

- Ian Buchanan – bass (1987–1996, 2013–2022)
- Carl Stokes – drums (1987–1996, 2003–2006, 2013–2022)
- James Murphy – guitar (1991)
- Barry Savage – guitar (1992–1996, 2013–2014)
- Adam Richardson – bass (2003–2006)
- Rob Engvikson – guitar (2003–2004)
- Dave Leitch – guitar (2004–2006)
- Migueloud – guitar (2022−2024)
- Gabriel Valcázar – drums (2022–2025)
- Robert Navajas – guitar (2024–2025)

Live members

- Nick Barker – drums (1993)
- Alberto Garcia – guitar (2024, 2025)

Timeline

== Discography ==
=== Studio albums ===
- To the Gory End (Vinyl Solution, 1990)
- Death Shall Rise (Vinyl Solution, 1991)
- The Sins of Mankind (Vinyl Solution, 1993)
- Black Faith (East West, 1995)
- Spirit in Flames (Copro, 2005)
- Shadow Gripped (Peaceville Records, 2018)
- Inverted World (Peaceville Records, 2025)

=== EPs ===
- Corporation$ (Copro, 2004)
- Ballcutter (Peaceville, 2019)

=== Demos ===
- No Fuckin' Cover (1988)
- Demo No. 2 (1989)

=== Split albums ===
- Live Death – split LP with Suffocation, Malevolent Creation and Exhorder (Restless Records, 1993)
