= Music of France =

In France, music reflects a diverse array of styles. In the field of classical music, France has produced several prominent romantic composers, while folk and popular music have seen the rise of the chanson and cabaret style. The oldest playable musical recordings were made in France using the earliest known sound recording device in the world, the phonautograph, which was patented by Édouard-Léon Scott de Martinville in 1857. France is also the 5th largest market by value in the world, and its music industry has produced many internationally renowned artists, especially in the nouvelle chanson and electronic music.

== Classical music ==
=== Medieval ===
French music history dates back to organum in the 10th century, followed by the Notre Dame School, an organum composition style. Troubadour songs of chivalry and courtly love were composed in the Occitan language between the 10th and 13th centuries, and the Trouvère poet-composers flourished in Northern France during this period. The fiddle was their instrument of choice. By the end of the 12th century, a form of song called the motet arose, accompanied by traveling musicians called jongleurs. In the 14th century, France produced two notable styles of music, Ars Nova and Ars Subtilior

=== Renaissance ===
Petits Chanteurs de Passy, Pavane composed by Thoinot Arbeau (1519 - 1595).

Burgundy, which was the mostly French-speaking area unified with the Kingdom of France in 1477, had become a major center for musical development in the musical continent Europe. This was followed by the rise of chansons and the Burgundian School.

=== Baroque ===
Influential composers included Jean-Baptiste Lully, Marc-Antoine Charpentier, Élisabeth Jacquet de La Guerre, Louis Couperin, François Couperin and Jacques Champion de Chambonnières. Jean Philippe Rameau, a prominent opera composer, wrote an influential treatise on musical theory, especially in the subject of harmony; he also introduced the clarinet into his orchestras. In the late Renaissance and early Baroque period, a type of popular secular vocal music called Air de cour spread throughout France.

=== Opera ===
The first French opera may be Akébar roi du Mogol, first performed in Carpentras in 1646. It was followed by the team of Pierre Perrin and Cambert, whose Pastoral in Music, performed in Issy, was a success, and the pair moved to Paris to produce Pomone (1671) and Les Peines et les Plaisirs de l'Amour (1672).

Jean-Baptiste Lully, who had become well known for composing ballets for Louis XIV, began creating a French version of the Italian opera seria, a kind of tragic opera known as tragédie lyrique or tragédie en musique - see (French lyric tragedy). His first was Cadmus from 1673. Lully's forays into operatic tragedy were accompanied by the pinnacle of French theatrical tragedy, led by Corneille and Racine.

Lully also developed the common beat patterns used by conductors to this day and was the first to take the role of leading the orchestra from the position of the first violin.

The French composer Georges Bizet composed Carmen, one of the best-known and most popular operas.

Lakmé - Duo des Fleurs
Lakmé by Léo Delibes, performed by Natalie Dessay and the Orchestre national du Capitole de Toulouse.

Gymnopedie No.1
Gymnopédie No.1 by Erik Satie, performed by Agathe Laforge.

Pavane pour une infante défunte
Pavane pour une infante défunte by Maurice Ravel, performed by Thérèse Dussaut

=== Classical era ===
Claude Balbastre was an organist, harpsichordist and fortepianist. He was one of the most famous musicians of his time.

Henri-Montan Berton, son of Pierre, is principally remembered as a composer of operas, most of which were first performed at the Opéra-Comique.

Chélard earned his living for much of his career as a violist at the Paris Opera. His 1827 opera Macbeth was a flop in Paris, but a great success in Munich.

Jeanne-Hippolyte Devismes married the director of the Paris Opéra. Her only known works are a song, "La Dame Jacinthe", and an opera, Praxitėle, which was a success and ran for 16 performances.

Harpsichordist and composer Jacques Duphly contributed to Jean-Jacques Rousseau dictionary, for articles relating to the art of playing the harpsichord.

=== Romantic era ===
One of the major French composers of the time, and one of the most innovative composers of the early Romantic era, was Hector Berlioz.

In the late 19th century, pioneers such as Georges Bizet, Jules Massenet, Gabriel Fauré, Maurice Ravel and Claude Debussy revitalized French music. The last two had an enormous impact on 20th-century music - both in France and abroad - and influenced many major composers such as Béla Bartók and Igor Stravinsky. Erik Satie was also a very significant composer from that era. His music is difficult to classify.

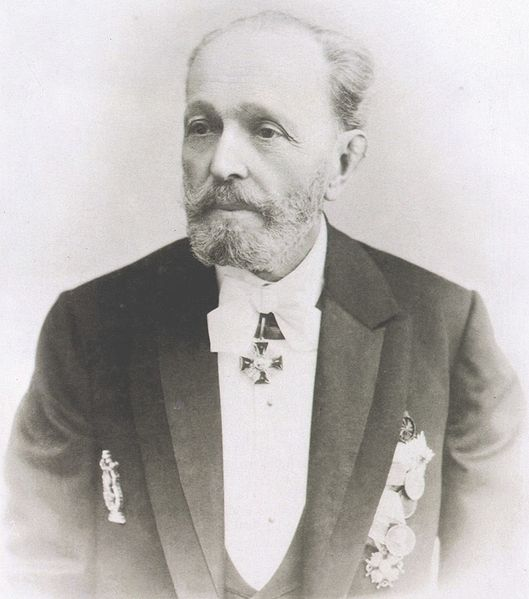
The ballet master and choreographer Marius Petipa.

=== 20th century ===
The early 20th century saw neo-classical music flourish in France, especially composers such as Lili Boulanger, Nadia Boulanger, Albert Roussel and Les Six, a group of musicians who gathered around Satie. Later in the century, Olivier Messiaen, Henri Dutilleux and Pierre Boulez proved influential. The latter was a leading figure of Serialism while Messiaen incorporated Asian (particularly Indian) influences and bird song and Dutilleux translated the innovations of Debussy, Bartók and Stravinsky into his own, very personal, musical idiom.

The most important French contribution to musical innovation of the past 35 years is a form of computer-assisted composition called "spectral music". The astonishing technical advances of the spectralist composers in the 1970s are only recently beginning to achieve wide recognition in the United States; major composers in this vein include Gérard Grisey, Tristan Murail, and Claude Vivier.

== Folk music ==
Traditional styles of music have survived most in remote areas such as the island of Corsica and mountainous Auvergne, as well as the more nationalistic regions of the Basques and the Bretons. In many cases, folk traditions were revived in relatively recent years to cater to tourists. These groupes folkloriques tend to focus on very early 20th-century melodies and the use of the piano accordion.

=== Paris ===
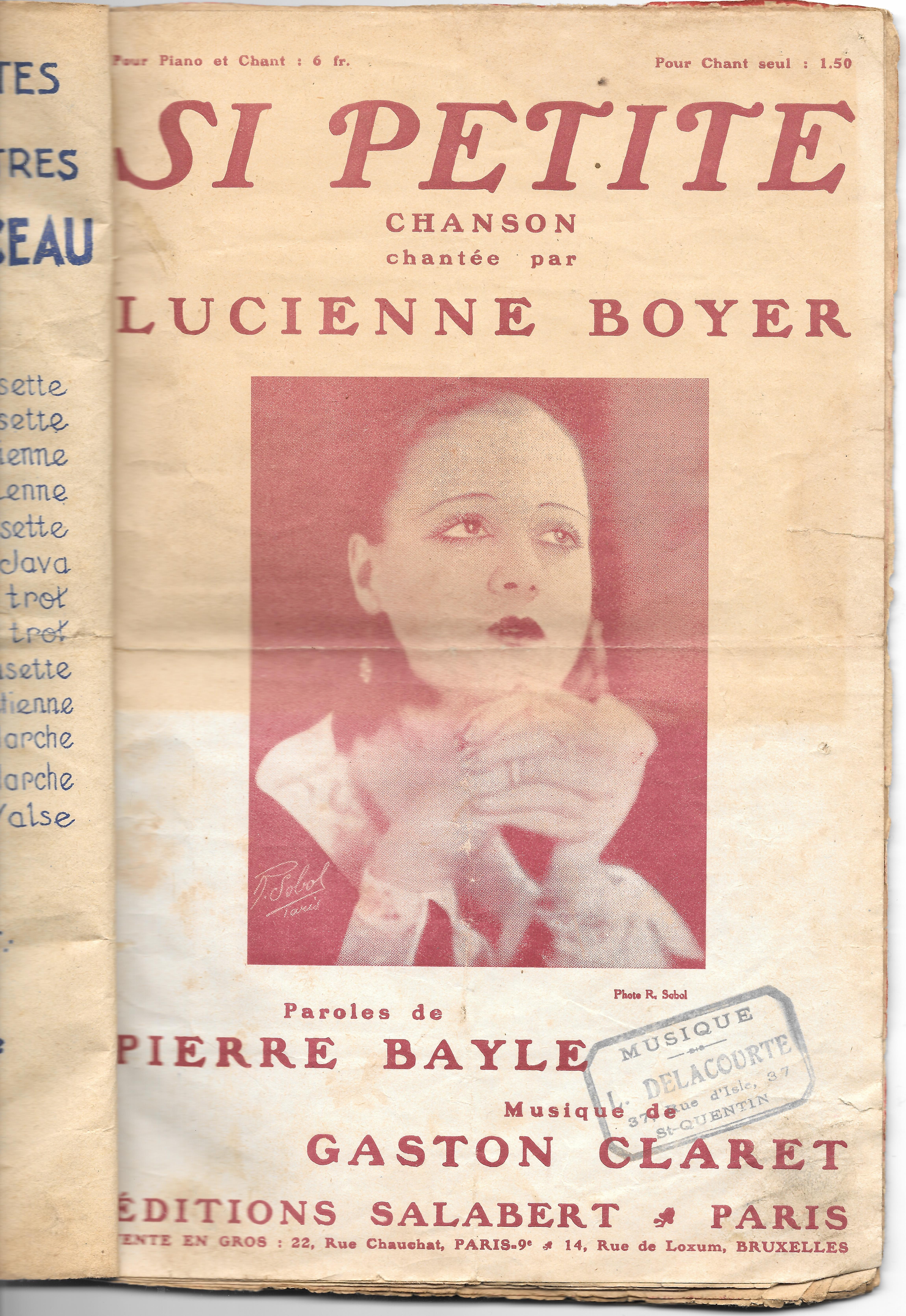
Cover page of the score of the song Si petite performed by Lucienne Boyer

In 1900 in Paris, a new style of waltz emerged, the "Valse musette" an evolution of Bal-musette also known as "French Waltz". Aimable, Émile Vacher, Marcel Azzola, Yvette Horner, André Verchuren were famous accordionists who played valse musette. There is also Yann Tiersen and its Amélie (soundtrack) of Amélie from Montmartre.

=== West France ===
The West of France comprises the Pays de Nantes, the provinces of Vendée, Anjou and Maine, and the Poitou-Charentes region. Traditions of ballad-singing, dance-songs and fiddle-playing have survived, predominantly in Poitou and the Vendée. Jérôme Bujeaud collected extensively in the area, and his 2-volume work "Chants et chansons populaires des provinces de l'ouest: Poitou, Saintonge, Aunis et Angoumois" (Niort, 1866) remains the principal scholarly collection of music and songs. In recent decades John Wright and Claude Ribouillault (amongst others) have done much to collect, analyse and promote the surviving traditions.

The Marais Breton of Vendée is noted particularly for its tradition of veuze playing - which has been revived by the bagpipe-maker and player Thierry Bertrand - and for traditional singers such as Pierre Burgaud.

Folk dances specific to the West of France include the courante, or maraichine, and the bal saintongeais. Bourrées in triple time have been noted in the 19th century by Bujeaud, and more recently, in Angoumois. Circle- or chain-dances accompanied by caller-and-response singing have been noted in the West, and also in other regions such as Gascony, Normandy and Brittany.

Notable contemporary folk musicians include Christian Pacher and Claude Ribouillault (Poitou) and the group La Marienne (Vendée.)

==== Brittany ====
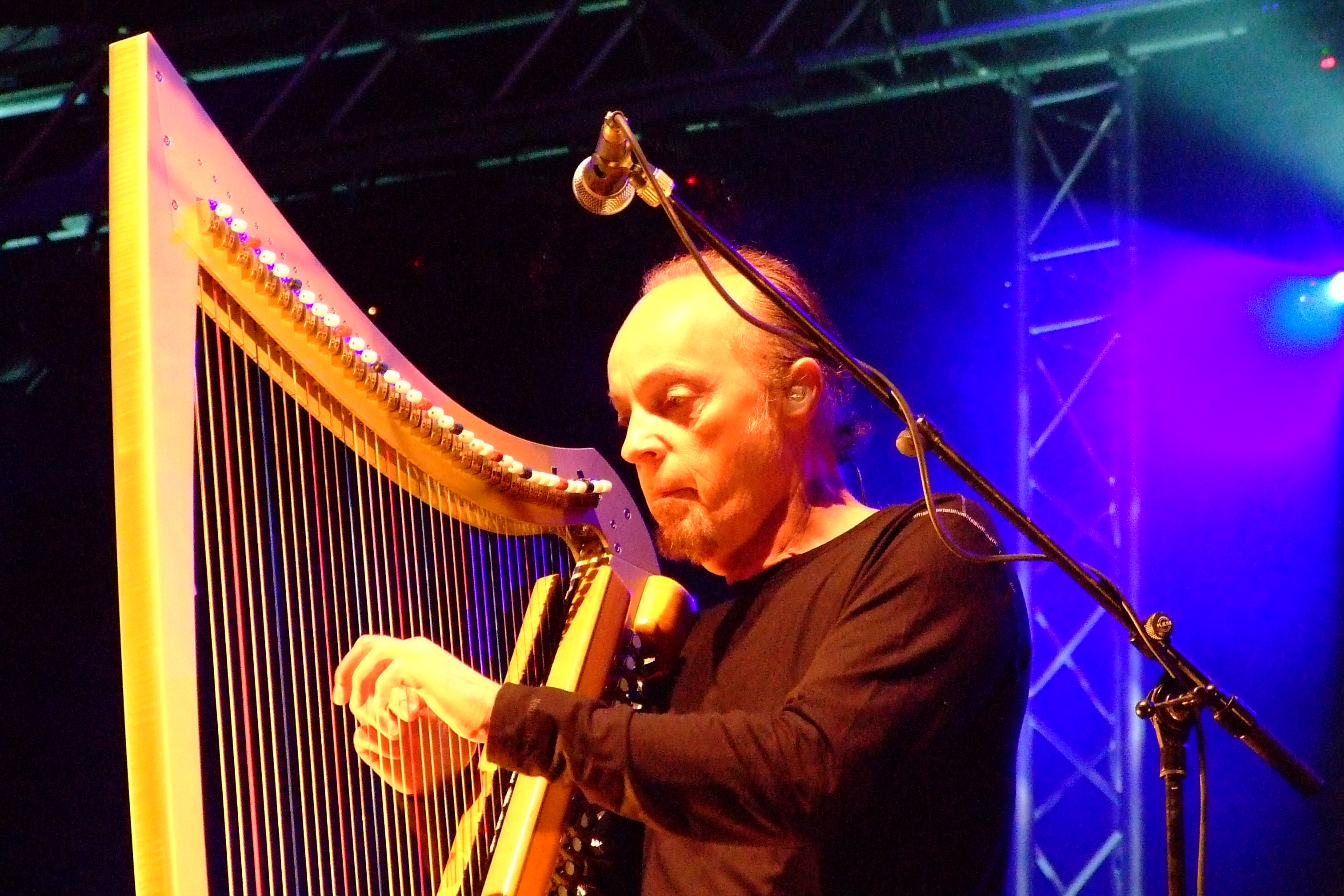
Alan Stivell, a Celtic musician and singer.

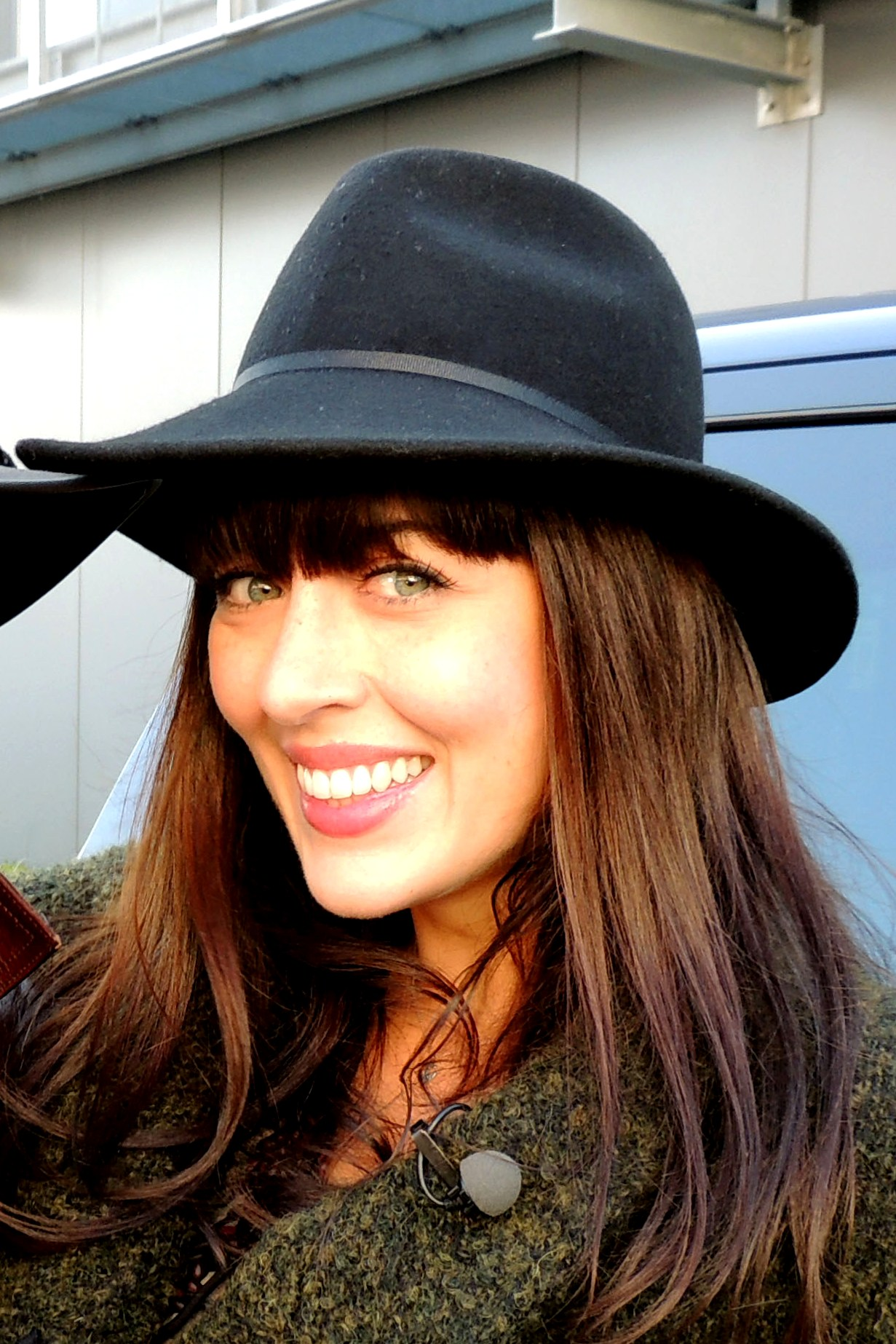
Nolwenn Leroy often uses to reinterpret traditional Breton and Celtic songs.

The folk music of Lower Brittany has Celtic elements, and more recently seen a revival in the city of Lorient which hosts the Festival Interceltique de Lorient music festival.

The documented history of Breton music begins with the publication of Barzaz-Breizh in 1839. A collection of folk songs compiled by Hersart de la Villemarqué, Barzaz-Breizh re-branded and promoted Breton traditions and helped ensure their continuity.

Sonneurs couples, consisting of a bombard and a biniou (bagpipe), are usually played at festoù-noz (Fest Noz) celebrations (some are famous, such as Printemps de Chateauneuf). It is swift dance music and has an older vocal counterpart called kan ha diskan. Unaccompanied call and response singing was interspersed with the gwerz, a form of ballad.

Probably the most popular form of Breton folk is the bagad pipe band, which features native instruments such as biniou and bombard alongside drums and, in more modern groups, biniou braz pipes. Modern revivalists include Kevrenn Alre Bagad and Bagad Kemper.

Alan Stivell is perhaps the most influential folk rock performer of continental Europe. After 1971's Renaissance of the Celtic Harp, Breton and other Celtic traditional music achieved mainstream success internationally. With Dan Ar Braz, he then released Chemins de Terre (1974), which launched Breton folk-rock. This set the stage for stars such as Malicorne in the ensuing decades.

In later years much has been done to collect and popularize the musical traditions of the Pays Gallo of Upper Brittany, for which the singer Bertran Ôbrée, his group Ôbrée Alie and the association DASTUM must take much credit. The songs of Upper Brittany are either in French or in Gallo.

Modern Breton folk music includes harpists such as Anne-Marie Jan, Anne Auffret and Myrdhin, while singers Kristen Nikolas, Andrea Ar Gouilh and Yann-Fanch Kemener have become mainstream stars. Instrumental bands, however, have been the most successful, including Gwerz, Bleizi Ruz, Strobinell, Sonerien Du and Tud.

=== Central France ===
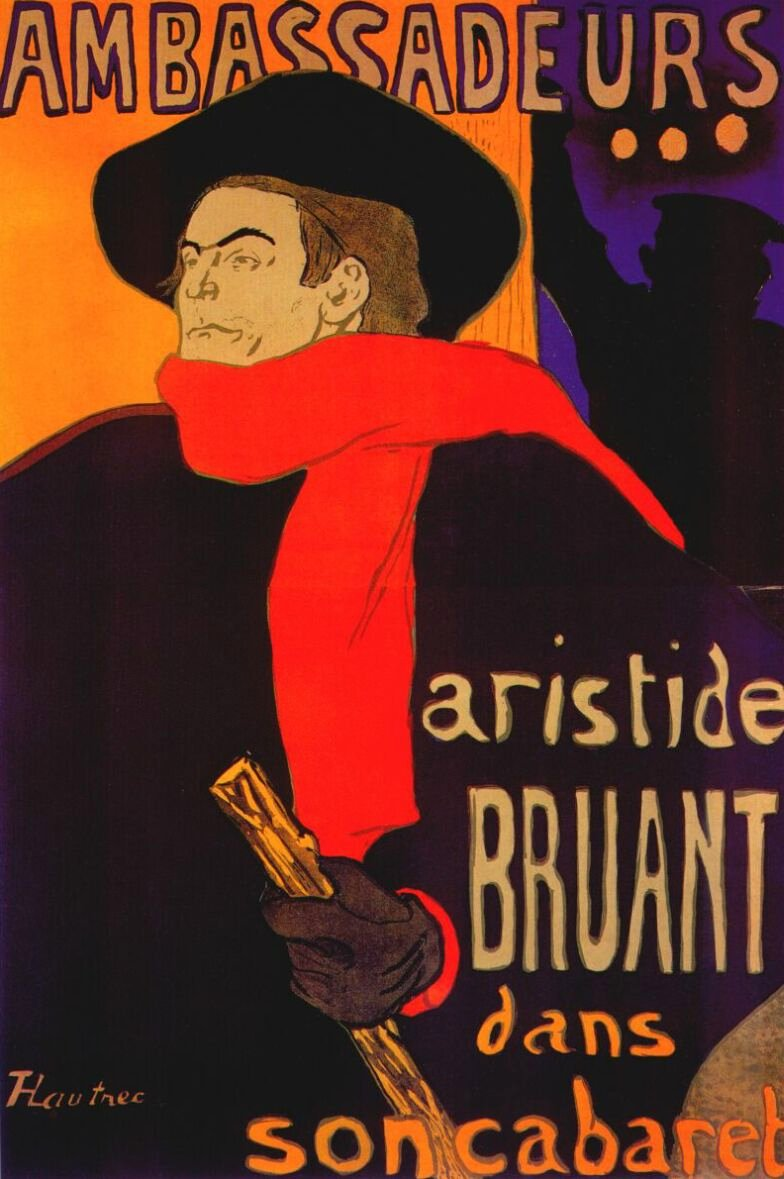
ambassadors, Aristide Bruant by Henri de Toulouse-Lautrec

Central France includes the regions of Auvergne, Limousin, Morvan, Nivernais, Bourbonnais and Berry. The lands are the home to a significant bagpipe tradition, as well as the iconic hurdy-gurdy and the dance bourrée. There are deep differences between the regions of Central France, with the Auvergne and Limousin retained the most vibrant folk traditions of the area. As an example of the area's diversity, the bourrée can come in either duple or triple meter; the latter is found in the south of the region, and is usually improvised with bagpipes and hurdy-gurdy, while the former is found in the north and includes virtuoso players.

==== Bagpipe and Hurdy-gurdy ====
The hurdy-gurdy, or vielle-à-roue, is essentially a mechanical violin, with keys or buttons instead of a fingerboard. It is made up of a curved, oval body, a set of keys and a curved handle, which is turned and connected to a wheel which bows the strings that are stopped by the keys. There is a moveable bridge, a variable number of drones and optional sympathetic strings. Other forms of the hurdy-gurdy are found all over Europe.

The bagpipe is found in a wide array of forms in France. The cabrette and grande cornemuse from Auvergne and Berry are best known. These forms are found at least as far back as the 17th century. Prominent bagpipers include Bernard Blanc, Frédéric Paris and Philippe Prieur, as well as bandleader Jean Blanchard of La Grande Bande de Cornemuses and Quintette de Cornemuses. Frédéric Paris is also known as a member of the Duo Chabenat-Paris, who use elements such as mixed polyphonic ensembles and melodies based on the bourrée. Bernard Blanc and Jean Blanchard, along with Éric Montbel from Lyon, were among the musicians who formed the basis of La Bamboche and Le Grand Rouge. It was these two bands who did more than anyone to revitalize the traditions of Central France during the 1970s folk revival. The festival of St. Chartier, a music festival held annually near Châteauroux, has been a focal point for the music of Auvergne and Limousin.

The regions of Morvan and Nivernais have produced some traditional stars, including Faubourg de Boignard and Les Ménétriers du Morvan, respectively. The Nivernais collector Achille Millien was also notable in the early part of the 20th century.

=== South France ===
==== Basque Country ====
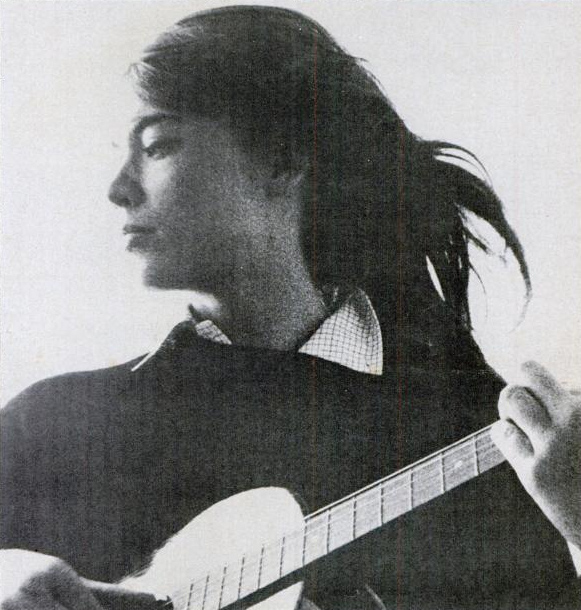
Françoise Hardy in a publicity photograph in Billboard, promoting the American release of her music via Kapp, 1965.

The music of the French Basque Country (east of the Basque Country) should be considered against a Pyrenean cultural background. Up to recent times and still ttun-ttun and xirula should be highlighted in traditional folk music (especially in the province of Soule) as a tabor and pipe like pair.

Mixel Etxekopar or Jean Mixel Bedaxagar have played a major role in Basque traditional music as xirula players as well as traditional singers. Other popular performers such as Benat Achiary take on a more experimental approach. These performers refer to a former tradition collected and restored by figures such as Etxahun Iruri (1908–1979) where singing improviser poets (bertsolaris) played an important role in popular culture. This bertsolari tradition relies almost exclusively on younger generations, and efforts are being made now to restore it along the lines of the "southern" tradition, i.e. of the Spanish Basque Country.

Music from the Basque Country currently caters to almost all tastes of music. A wide range of music is played in Basque, ranging from choral music (Oldarra in Biarritz), elaborate music bands (e.g. Bidaia), ska, or hardcore trends. Its positive reviews praise it for the fine bare voices that have arisen with the likes of Maddi Oihenart, Maialen Errotabehere, or Alabak.

==== Corsica ====
Corsican polyphonic singing is perhaps the most unusual of the French regional music varieties. Sung by male trios, it is strongly harmonic and occasionally dissonant. Works can be either spiritual or secular. Modern groups include Canta u Populu Corsu, I Muvrini, Tavagna and Chjami Aghjalesi; some groups have been associated with Corsican nationalism.

Corsican musical instruments include the caramusa (cornemuse bagpipe), cetera (16-stringed lute), mandulina (mandolin), pifana (a type of gemshorn) and urganettu (diatonic accordion).

== Popular music ==
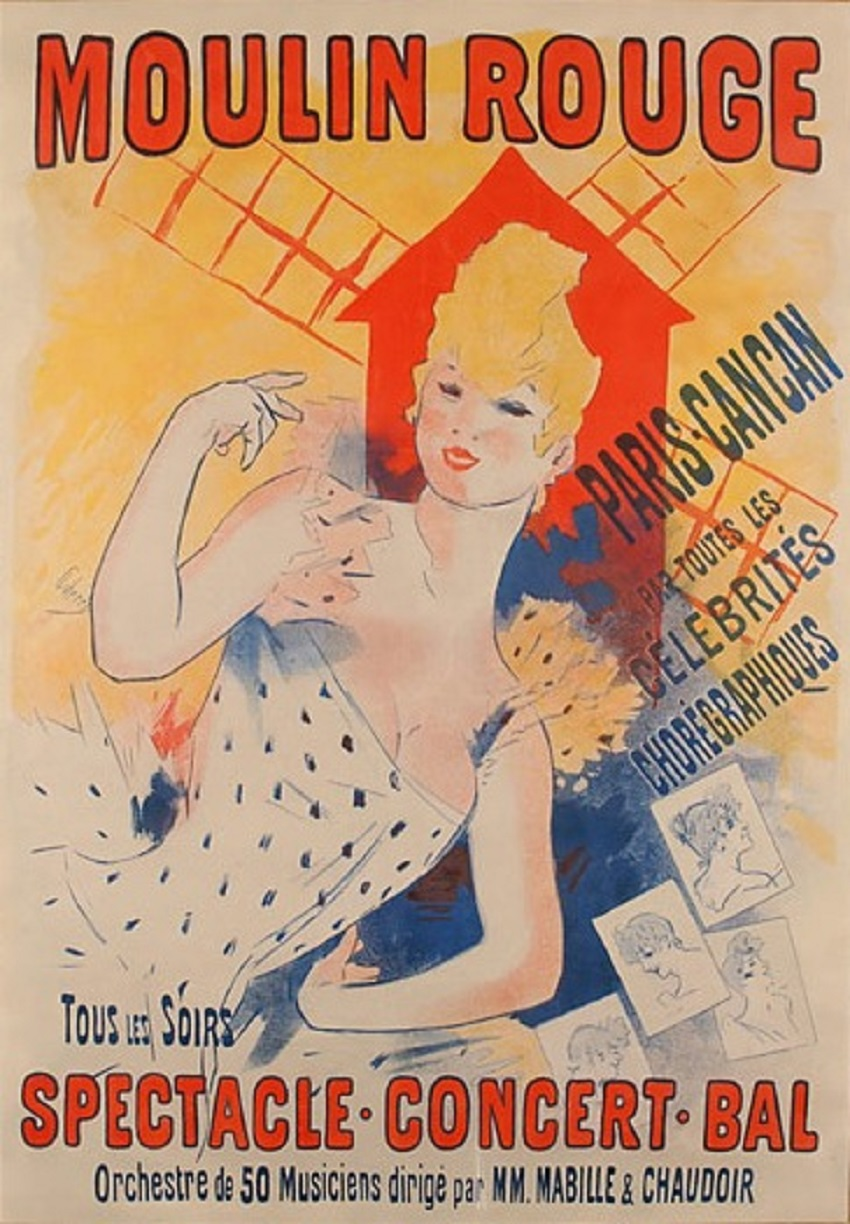
Poster from the cabaret Moulin Rouge in Paris (1890), the spiritual birthplace of the French Cancan dance.

The 20th century saw the apogee of the Cabaret style with Yvette Guilbert as a major star. The era lasted through to the 1930s and saw the likes of Édith Piaf, Charles Trenet, Maurice Chevalier, Tino Rossi, Félix Mayol, Lucienne Boyer, Marie-Louise Damien, Marie Dubas, Fréhel, Georges Guibourg and Jean Sablon.

During the 50s and 60s, it was the golden age of Chanson Française: Juliette Gréco, Mireille Mathieu, Georges Brassens, Jacques Brel, Gilbert Bécaud, Monique Serf (Barbara), Léo Ferré, Charles Aznavour and Alain Barrière. The Yéyé style was popular in the 1950s and 60s with Sheila, Claude François, Françoise Hardy and Johnny Hallyday. This era also saw Serge Gainsbourg and Jane Birkin experiment with avant-garde pop, integrating provocative themes and diverse musical styles, marking French pop as emotionally sophisticated and distinct.

The 1970s brought disco, progressive rock, and electronic influences. Artists like Michel Sardou, Claude François, and Daft Punk merged French pop with global trends. Jean-Michel Jarre pioneered electronic music, notably with Oxygène, pushing French music onto the world stage. In the 1980s, French pop fused international genres with artists like Vanessa Paradis and Mylène Farmer, alongside the rise of chanson nouvelle, led by Etienne Daho and Alain Bashung. This era was marked by new wave, synth-pop, and rock influences, reflecting France’s shifting cultural landscape. By the 1990s, French pop achieved global success, especially through electronic music with Daft Punk, Air, and the French touch movement. This period also saw the rise of variété française, with artists like Céline Dion and Zazie gaining international acclaim while staying rooted in French culture.

=== Cabaret ===
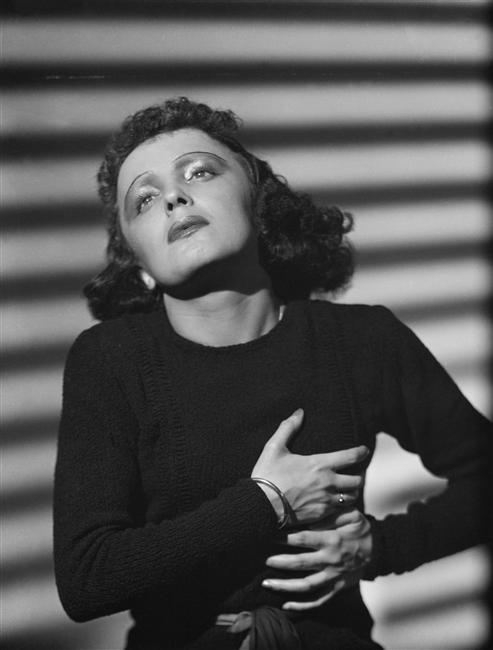
Édith Piaf referred to as "La Môme Piaf" (The Little Sparrow).

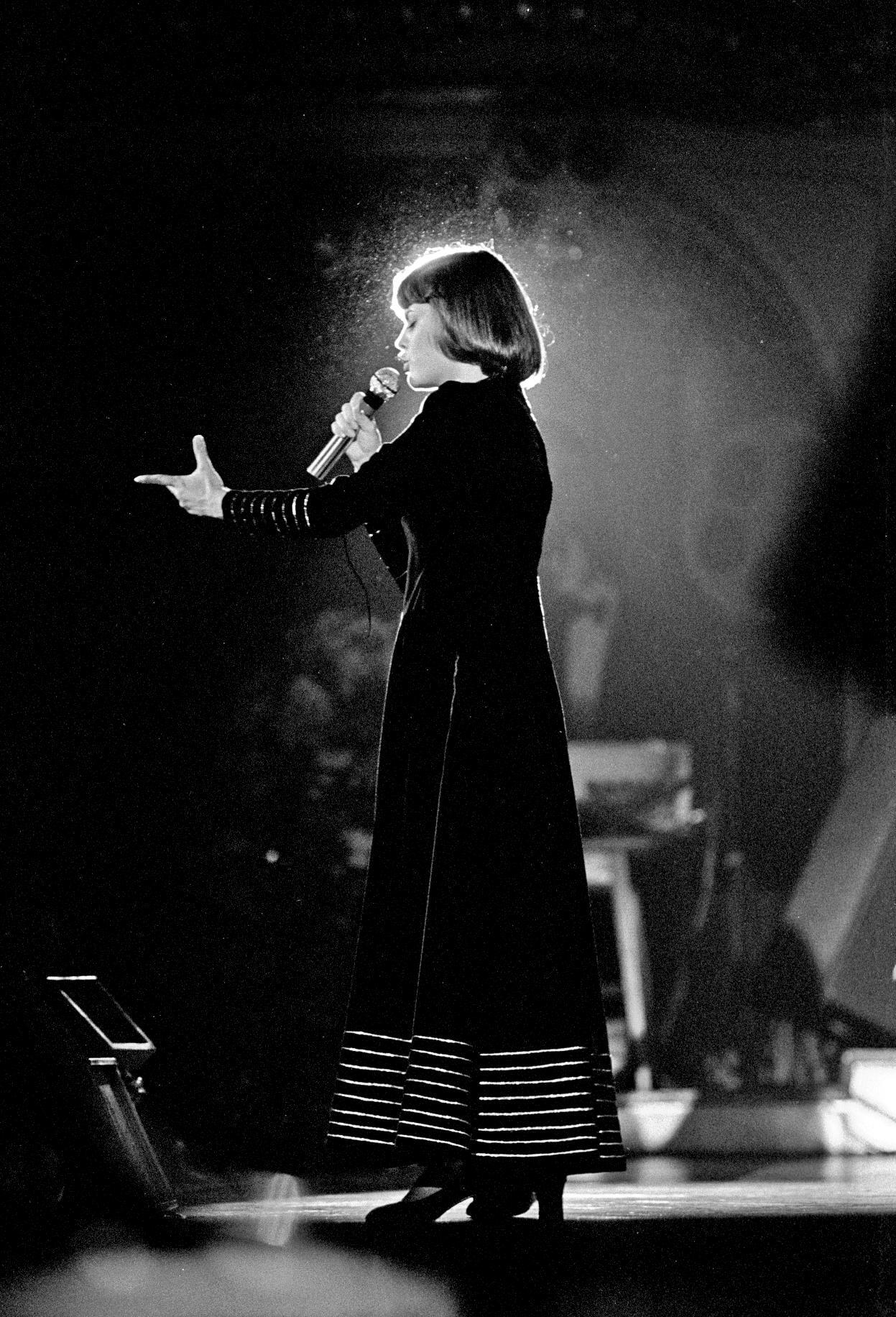
Mireille Mathieu in Hamburg, 1971

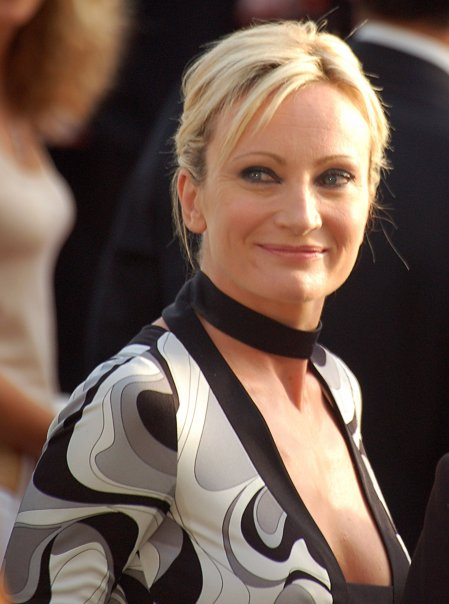
Patricia Kaas, incarnation of the new French cabaret spirit.

Cabaret is a typical form of French musical entertainment featuring chanson, music, dance, comedy and spectacles. The audience usually sits at tables, often dining or drinking, and performances are sometimes introduced by a master of ceremonies. The first cabaret was opened in 1881 in Montmartre, Paris, by Rodolphe Salis and was called Le Chat Noir (The Black Cat). Built in 1889, Moulin Rouge is famous for the large red windmill on its roof. Other popular French cabarets include the Folies Bergère and Le Lido. Cabarets were a key venue in the careers of many singers such as Mistinguett, Josephine Baker, Charles Trenet and Edith Piaf. More recently, Patricia Kaas embodies the revival of the French cabaret style.

=== Cancan ===
The Cancan, also called French-Cancan, is a high-energy and physically demanding musical dance, traditionally performed by a chorus line of female dancers who wear costumes with long skirts, petticoats, and black stockings. The main features of the dance are the lifting and manipulation of the skirts, with high kicking and suggestive, provocative body movements. The Infernal Galop from Jacques Offenbach's Orpheus in the Underworld is the tune most associated with the Cancan. The Cancan first appeared in the working-class ballrooms of Montparnasse in Paris in around 1830. It was a more lively version of the Galop, a dance in quick 2/4 time, which often featured as the final figure in the Quadrille.

=== Chanson ===
Chanson Française is the typical style of French music (chanson means "song" in French) and is still very popular in France. Some of the most important artists included: Édith Piaf, Juliette Gréco, Mireille Mathieu, Jacques Brel, Georges Brassens, Gilbert Bécaud, Monique Serf (Barbara), Léo Ferré, Charles Aznavour, Salvatore Adamo and Dalida plus the more art-house musicians like Brigitte Fontaine. Also during the 1950s one of the more representative of Montmartre cabaret singers was Suzanne Robert.

During the 1970s, new artists modernized the chanson Française (Michel Fugain, Renaud, Francis Cabrel, Alain Souchon, Jacques Higelin, Alain Chamfort, Joe Dassin) and also in the 80s (Étienne Daho, Têtes Raides) till now (Benjamin Biolay, Zaz, Vincent Delerm, Bénabar, Jean-Louis Murat, Miossec, Juliette, Mano Solo, Jacques Higelin, Matthieu Chedid, Mathieu Boogaerts, Daniel Darc, Maurane, Christina Goh, Renan Luce). Singer-songwriter Serge Gainsbourg began as a jazz musician in the 1950s and spanned several eras of French popular music including pop, rock, reggae, new wave, disco and even hip-hop.

=== Musette ===
Musette is a style of French music and dance that became popular in Paris in the 1880s. Musette uses the accordion as main instrument, and often symbolizes the French art of living abroad. Émile Vacher (1883-1969) was the star of the new style. Other popular musette accordionists include Aimable Pluchard, Yvette Horner and André Verchuren. In 2001, the musette-style was a huge international success through the album Amélie composed by Yann Tiersen.

French Musette
Mado by Émile Vacher

=== Yéyé ===
Yéyé is a style of popular music that emerged from France in the early 1960s. The yé-yé movement had its origins in the radio programme Salut les copains, which was first aired in October 1959. Most famous Yéyé stars include Johnny Hallyday, Eddy Mitchell, Richard Anthony, Dick Rivers and the popular girls such as France Gall, Sheila, Sylvie Vartan, and artists who fuse various music genres such as Chantal Goya, Dalida or Claude François. These were popular female teen idols, and included Françoise Hardy, who was the first to write her own songs.

== Contemporary music ==
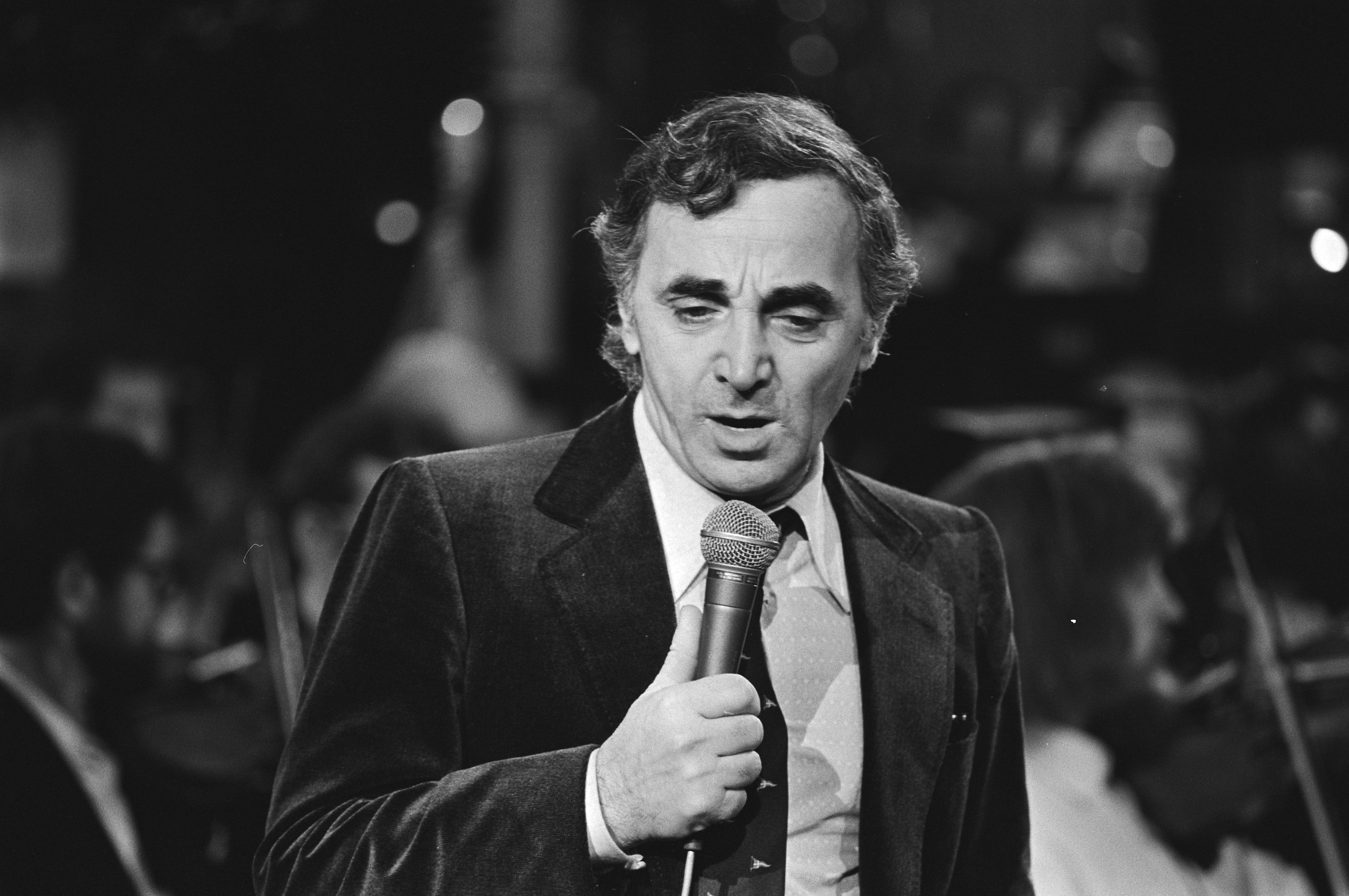
Charles Aznavour was a French-Armenian singer, who was widely regarded as one of France's greatest musical artists.

=== Pop ===
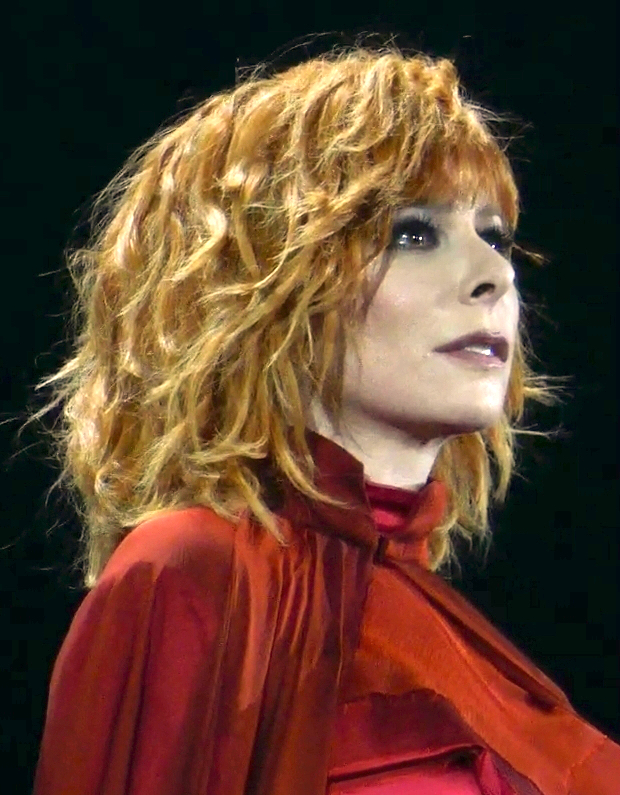
The pop-singer Mylène Farmer holds the record for the most number one hit singles in the French charts.

The more commercial and pop part of Chanson is called Variété in French, and included Vanessa Paradis, Patricia Kaas, Patrick Bruel, Marc Lavoine, Pascal Obispo, Florent Pagny, Francis Cabrel, Étienne Daho, Alain Souchon, Laurent Voulzy and Jean-Jacques Goldman. The superstar status of diva Mylène Farmer inspired pop-rock performers such as Zazie, Lorie, Alizée, and R&B singers like Nâdiya and Ophelie Winter.

More recently, the success of musical television shows have spawned a new generation of young pop-music stars including Nolwenn Leroy, Grégory Lemarchal, Christophe Willem, Julien Doré and Élodie Frégé. The French-Caribbean singer Shy'm enjoys a status of popstar in France since her first album in 2006, as well as her male counterpart Matt Pokora. Notable pop-rock groups include Niagara and Indochine. Michel Sardou is also known for his love songs ("La maladie d'amour", "Je vais t'aimer").

=== Rock ===
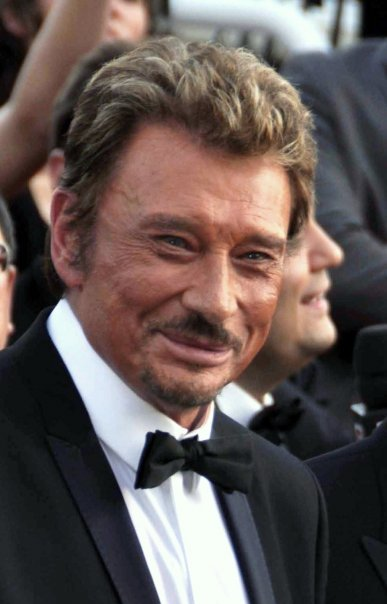
The rock singer Johnny Hallyday sold more than 110 million records worldwide since 1960.

Rock'n Roll started to become popular in the 60s with singers like Johnny Hallyday. There were also innovative musicians in France as the psychedelic rock trend was peaking worldwide. Jean-Pierre Massiera's Les Maledictus Sound (1968) and Aphrodite's Child's 666 were the most influential. Later came bands such as Magma, Martin Circus, Au Bonheur des Dames, Trust, Téléphone. In the early 70s, Breton musician Alan Stivell (Renaissance de la Harpe Celtique) launched the field of French folk rock by combining psychedelic and progressive rock sounds with Breton and Celtic folk styles. In the 80s and 90s, bands like Noir Désir and artists like Paul Personne carried the torch with grunge and blues influences.

French rock has continued to evolve, blending genres and embracing new influences. Bands like Phoenix and Air brought French rock to international audiences, mixing elements of indie, electronic, and pop with traditional rock. Phoenix’s 2009 album Wolfgang Amadeus Phoenix won global acclaim, blending indie rock with catchy, upbeat sounds. In the 2010s, Indochine, Shaka Ponk, and La Femme pushed the boundaries further, combining rock with electronic, funk, and psychedelic influences. Indochine, a long-standing group, continued to captivate with their mix of new wave and rock.

Progressive Rock

France became one of the leading producers of Progressive rock in the 1970s. Aficionados worldwide were enamoured by recordings such as Ange's Le Cimetiere des arlequins, Pulsar's Halloween, Shylock's Ile de Fievre, Atoll's L'Araignee-Mal and Eskaton's Ardeur. Most well-known, however, may be the band Magma which created its own genre, Zeuhl music.

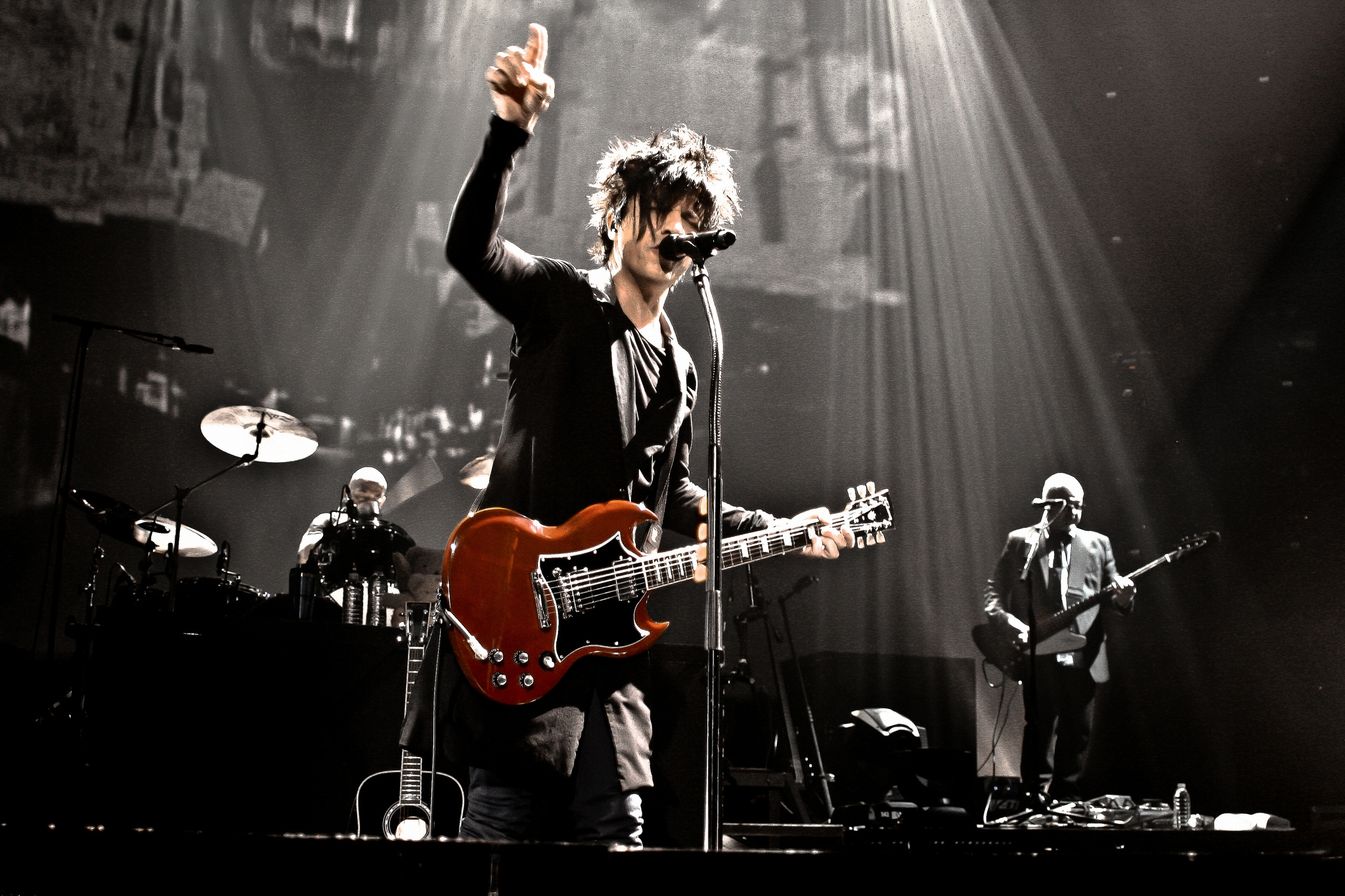
Indochine hit "L'Aventurier" (1982) was inspired by the Belgian comic character Bob Morane.

Eighties Rock (1980)

In the 1980s, French rock spawned myriad styles, many closely connected with other Francophone musical scenes in Switzerland, Canada and especially Belgium. Pub rock (Telephone), psychobilly (La Muerte), pop-punk (Les Thugs), synthpop and punk rock (Bérurier Noir, Bijou and Gill Dougherty) were among the styles represented in this era. Beginning in the 1980s, Les Rita Mitsouko became very popular throughout Europe with their unique blending of punk, new wave, dance and cabaret elements.

Punk rock had arisen in the 1970s and continued into the next decade, perhaps best represented by Minimum Vital who are still active, Oberkampf and Métal Urbain. 80s progressive rock peaked early in the decade, with Dün's Eros, Emeraude's Geoffroy and Terpandre's Terpandre, all from 1981, representing the genre's pinnacle, in French West Indies (Guadeloupe Island) The Bolokos represent the genre.

=== Metal ===
French heavy metal bands include Gojira, Dagoba, Anorexia Nervosa, Hacride, Eths, Loudblast, Carcariass, Massacra, Gorod, Kronos, Yyrkoon, Benighted, Necrowretch, and Fairyland. Many of these bands play in the death metal, thrash metal and/or power metal styles.

France also has a large black metal movement, including, Belenos, Deathspell Omega, Nocturnal Depression, Blut Aus Nord, Peste Noire, Vorkreist, Arkhon Infaustus, Merrimack and Antaeus, and the organization known as Les Légions Noires made up of such bands as Mütiilation, Vlad Tepes and Torgeist. The 'shoegaze' black metal movement also has many bands hailing from France, such as Alcest, Les Discrets and Amesoeurs.

=== Electronic ===
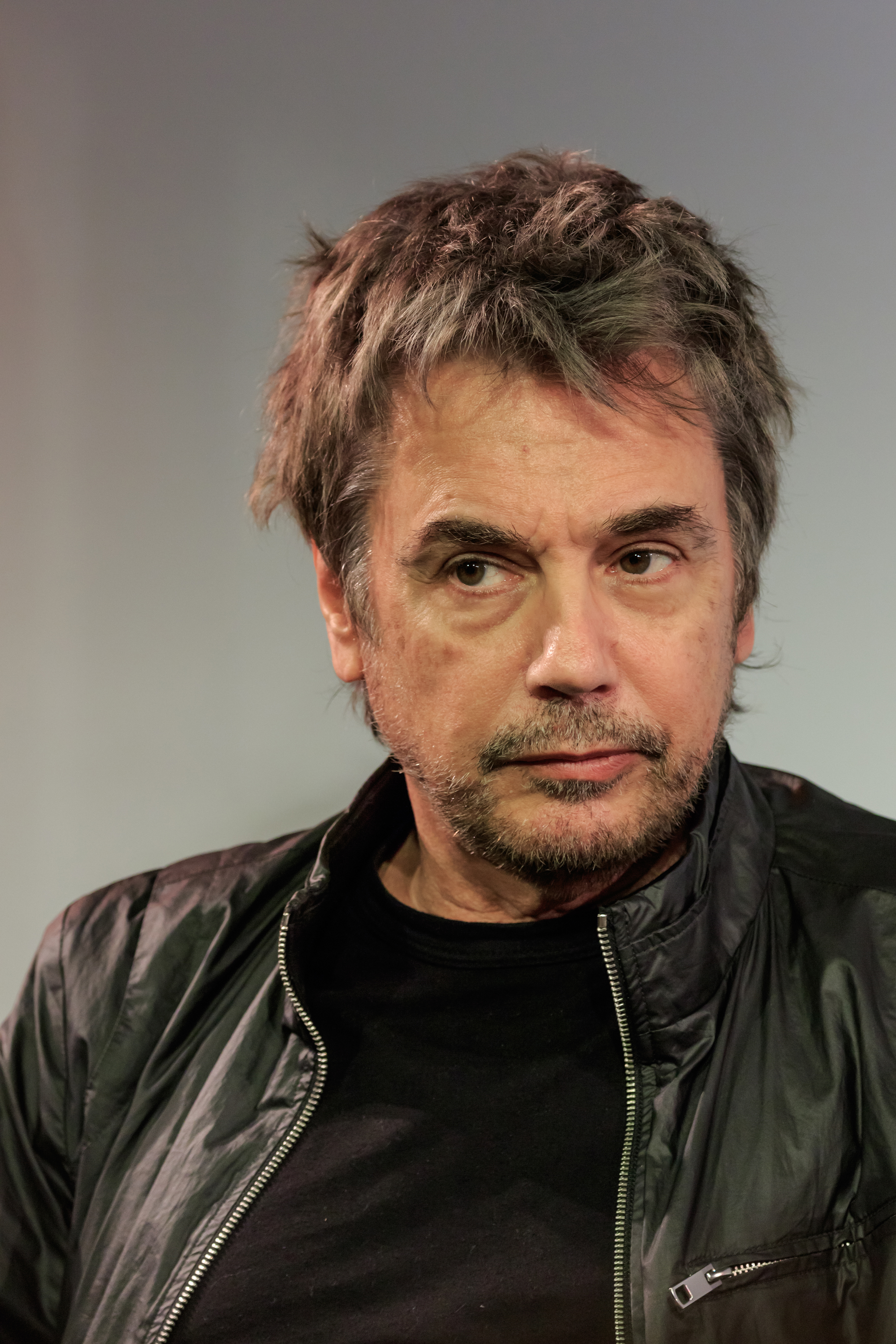
The pioneer of electronic music Jean-Michel Jarre.

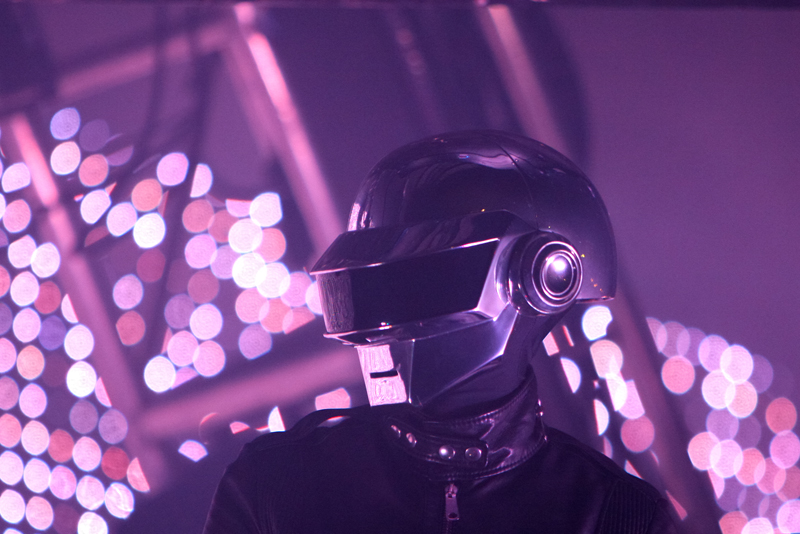
Daft Punk in Miami, FL.

Electronic music, as exemplified by Jean Michel Jarre and Cerrone, achieved a wide French audience. The French electro-pop duos Air and Daft Punk and techno artists Laurent Garnier and David Guetta found a wide audience in the late 1990s and early first decade of the 21st century, both locally and internationally. Groups such as Justice, M83, Phoenix, Télépopmusik, Polo & Pan, and Klingande continue to enjoy success.

=== Dance ===
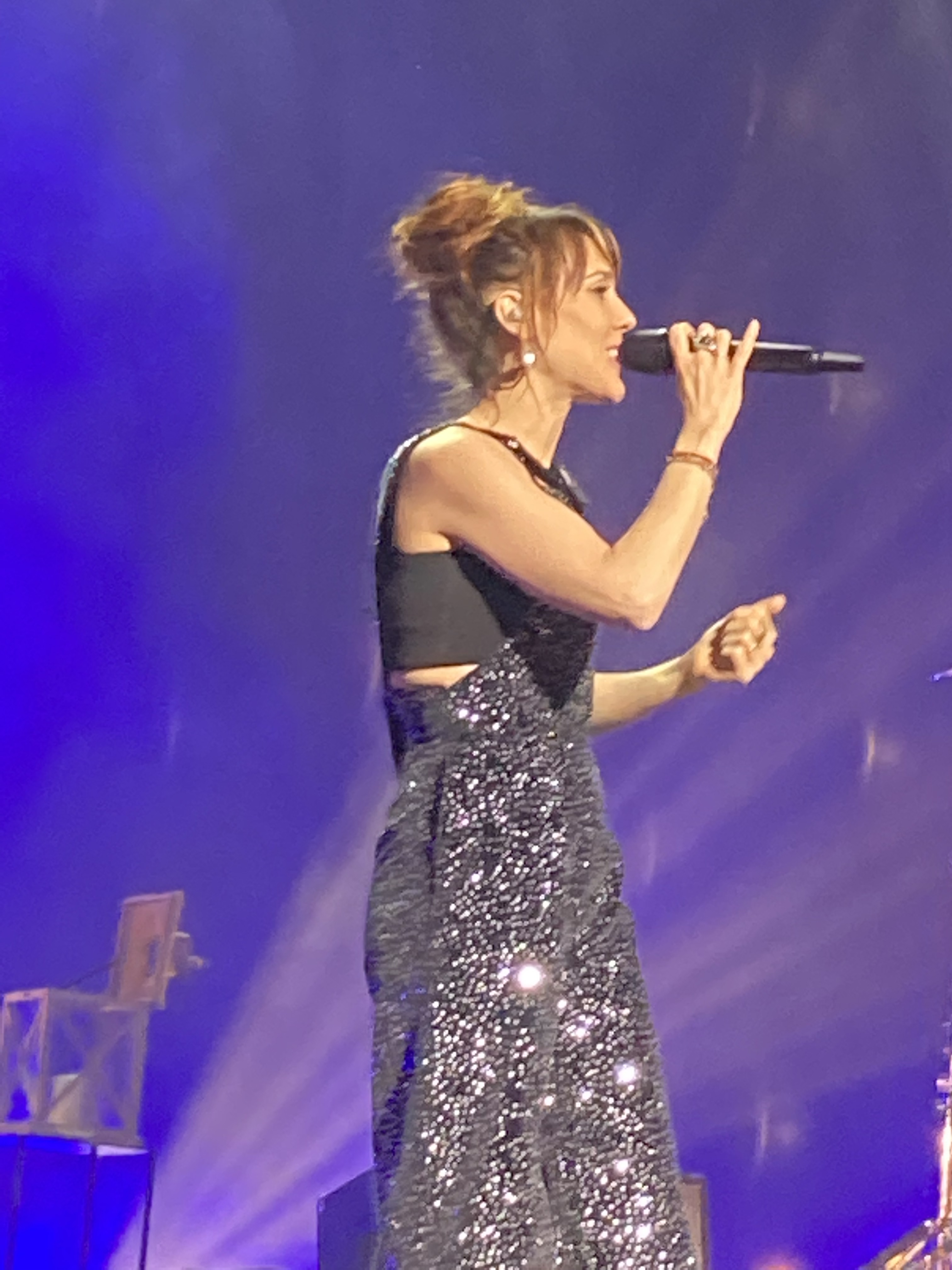
Zaz known for her unique voice and eclectic musical style.

French house is a late 1990s form of house music, part of the 1990s and first decade of the 21st-century European dance music scene and the latest form of Euro disco. The genre is also known as "Disco house", "Neu-disco" (new disco), "French touch", "filter house" or "tekfunk". The early mid/late 1990s productions was notable for the "filter effect" used by artists such as Daft Punk. Other productions use more mainstream vocals and samples. French house is greatly influenced by the 1970s Euro disco and especially the short lived space disco music style (a European (mostly French) variation of Hi-NRG disco), and also by P-Funk and the productions of Thomas Bangalter.

The first French house experiments (at the time called "disco house" and "neu disco") became notable in the international market between 1997 and 1999. Daft Punk, Stardust and Cassius were the first international successful artists of the genre and their videos show their "space disco" roots.

Several artists played important roles in popularizing the genre, which, in 2000, achieved international success. Bob Sinclar's single "I Feel For You" charted in several countries, including Germany, Italy, and Spain. Etienne de Crécy's album Tempovision charted at #57 in France and included the successful single "Am I Wrong." In September, the French house group Modjo released "Lady (Hear Me Tonight), which debuted at #1 in the UK and became a top-ten hit in thirteen countries. Galleon followed the next year.

Today most French house bands and artists have moved on to other music styles, notably a French variation of electro, that is danced on the milky way/Tecktonik style.

=== Disco ===
The Village People, co-founded by the two French composers Jacques Morali and Henri Belolo, was a major international disco group. Notable French disco singers also include Dalida, Sheila and B. Devotion, Ottawan, Voyage, Cerrone, Patrick Hernandez and F.R. David, respectively known for their worldwide hits "Monday, Tuesday... Laissez-moi danser" (1979), "Spacer" (1979), "D.I.S.C.O." (1979), "You're OK / T'es OK" (1980), Souvenirs (1978), "Supernature" (1977), "Born to Be Alive" (1979) and "Words" (1982).

=== Hip-Hop ===
Hip-hop was exported to France in the 1980s, and French rappers and DJs such as David Guetta and MC Solaar, also had some success. Hip-hop came from New York City, invented in the 1970s by African Americans. By 1983, the genre had spread to much of the world, including France. Almost immediately, French performers (musicians and breakdancers) began their career, including Max-Laure Bourjolly and Traction Avant. Popularity was brief, however, and hip-hop quickly receded to the French underground. Hip-hop was adapted to French context, especially the poverty of large cities known as banlieues ("suburbs") where many French of foreign descent live, especially from the former colonial countries (West Africa and Caribbean). If there is some influence of African musics and of course American hip-hop, French hip-hop is also strongly connected to French music, with strong reciprocal influences, from French pop and chanson, both in music and lyrics.

Paname City Rappin (1984, by Dee Nasty) was the first album released, and the first major stars were IAM, Suprême NTM and MC Solaar, whose 1991 Qui Sème le Vent Récolte le Tempo, was a major hit. Through the nineties, the music grew to become one of the most popular genres in France with huge success of the pioneers (IAM, Suprême NTM) and newcomers (Ministère Amer, Oxmo Puccino, Lunatic). France is the world's second-largest hip-hop market. The most popular rappers of the 2000s are Diam's, Booba and Kenza Farah with successful artists more underground such as La Rumeur, la Caution and TTC.

== Overseas music ==
=== French Polynesia ===
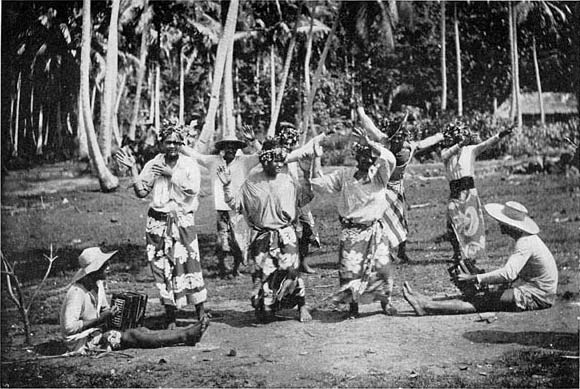
A ʻupaʻupa, a traditional dance from Tahiti (1900).

=== Réunion island ===
Séga music is a popular style that mixes African and European music. The most popular sega musicians include Ousanousava, Baster, Maxime Laope. Maloya music has a strong African element reflected in the use of slave chants and work songs. The most popular sega musicians include Danyèl Waro, Firmin Viry, Granmoun Lélé, Mars tou sèl.

=== Martinique and Guadeloupe ===
Zouk

Zouk is a fast jump-up carnival beat originating from the Caribbean islands of Guadeloupe and Martinique, popularized by the French Antillean band Kassav' in the 1980s. Very rapid in tempo, the style lost ground in the 1980s due to the strong presence of kadans or compas, the main music of the French Antilles. Today, zouk is the French Antilles compas, also called zouk-love In Africa, Kassav's zouk and the Haitian compas they featured, gained popularity in francophone and lusophone countries. It is also particularly popular in North America in the Canadian province of Quebec.

Bouyon

Bouyon (Boo-Yon) is a form of popular music of Dominica, also known as jump up music in Guadeloupe and Martinique. The best-known band in the genre is Windward Caribbean Kulture (WCK), who originated the style in 1988. Over the years, thanks to inter-trade with the Dominicans and the mass participation of Guadeloupe at the World Creole Music Festival, the flagship group as Triple kay and MFR band began to democratize and local artists were inducted including the remix Allo Triple kay with Daly and "Big Ting Poppin 'Daly alone. A popular offshoot within the bouyon is called bouyon hardcore, a style characterized by its lewd and violent lyrics. Popular Bouyon gwada musicians include, Wee Low, Suppa, Doc J, Yellow gaza, etc.

Antilles hip-hop

The French Antilles hip-hop is a style of hip-hop originating from the French departments of Guadeloupe and Martinique in the Caribbean. Usually in French and Antillean creole, the French Antilles hip-hop is most popular in the French Antilles and France.

Rock In Gwada

Although a minority genre, French Antilles rock groups participate in the broadening of the Caribbean musical spectrum. The spearheads like The Bolokos or Livestocks include themes, rhythms or Caribbean melodies on British or American influences. The "Rock In Gwada" collective brings together some of these groups whose first festival took place in Petit-Bourg in 2016.

== International music ==
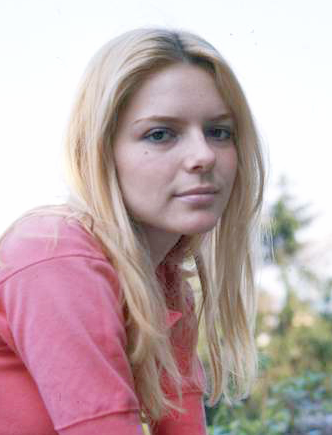
France Gall gained international fame with her wins in the Eurovision Song Contest in 1965. Representing Luxembourg

French language is spoken worldwide and many international artists contribute to French music.

=== Europe ===
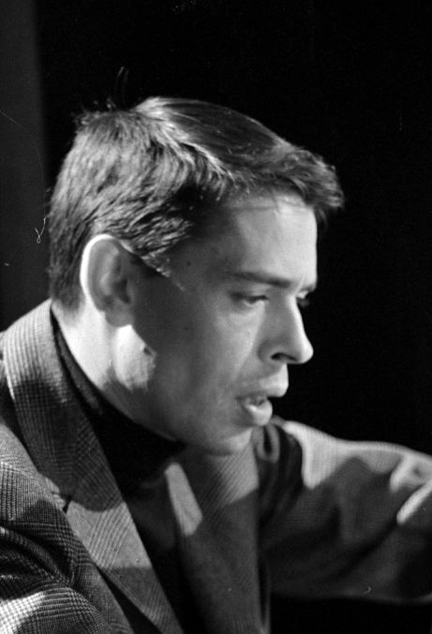
Jacques Brel.

The greatest Belgian chansonnier was Jacques Brel, whose classic songs have been covered by several international artists. Others such as Salvatore Adamo, Axelle Red, Lara Fabian, Maurane, Selah Sue, Frédéric François and Annie Cordy have also enjoyed some success in France and other French-speaking countries.

=== North America ===
Quebec singers are very popular in France, and both nations have influenced each other in terms of music styles. Quebec artists have been taking the French stage quite extensively. Notable singers that have performed in France included: Céline Dion, Diane Tell, Cœur de pirate, Garou, Isabelle Boulay, Lynda Lemay and many others. Roch Voisine and Natasha St-Pier, who are of Acadian heritage, reached the top of charts in France with their famous songs "Hélène" (1989) and "Tu trouveras" (2002). Rock singer Avril Lavigne, whose father is of French origin (born in Lorraine), is also popular in France, and she obtained her French passport and citizenship in 2011. Salvatore Adamo and Charles Aznavour are widely recognized in America

=== Asia ===
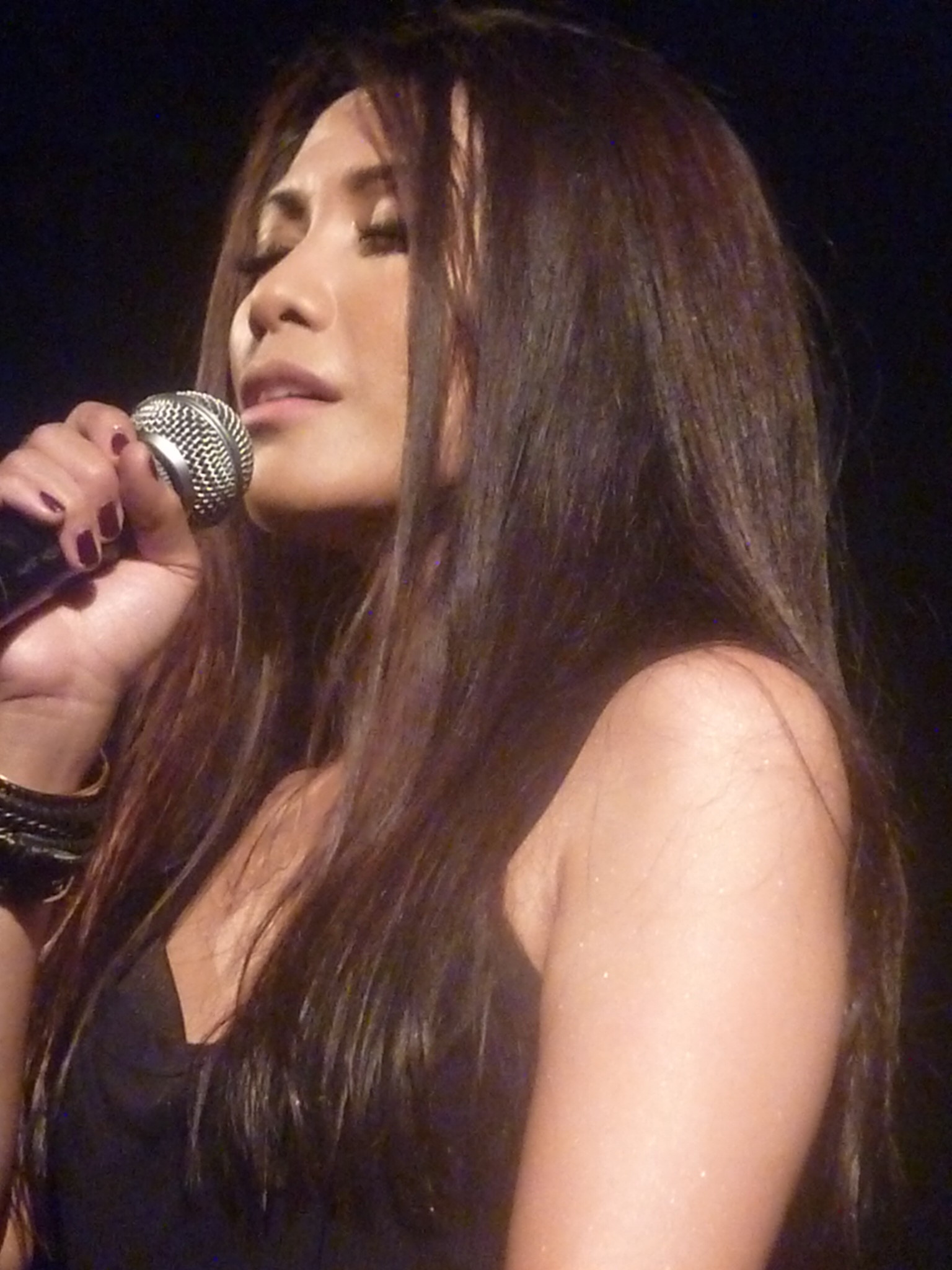
Anggun during her concert in Le Trianon, Paris (2012).

One of the most famous French-speaking Asian artists is Anggun, a French-naturalised singer from Indonesia, best known for her single La Neige au Sahara (Snow on the Sahara) written by Erick Benzi. The song was released in 1997 as her debut international single in 33 countries worldwide, and made the charts in Europe (#1 in Italy), America (#16 in USA Billboard), and Asia (#1 in Indonesia, #3 in Malaysia). French music also found surprising favorable reception in Japan, where the language and culture from France is often seen as romantic. Some Japanese groups use the French language, such as Malice Mizer or Versailles, named after the Château de Versailles. Charles Aznavour and Mireille Mathieu are widely recognized in Japan.

=== Africa ===
Beginning in the 1920s, Raï music developed in Algeria as a combination of rural and urban music. Often viewed as a form of resistance towards censorship, many of the conventional values of the old raï became modernized with instruments, synthesizers and modern equipment. Later performers added influences from funk, hip-hop, rock and other styles, creating most notably a pop genre called lover's raï. Performers include Rachid Taha and Faudel. Originating of the city of Oran, raï shot to the top of the French, Swiss and Dutch charts in 1992 with the release of Khaled's single Didi.

== Music journals ==
=== Volume! ===
One journal that provides coverage of popular music in France along with popular music history is Volume!. Volume! (subtitled in French:La revue des musiques populaires - The journal of popular music studies) is a biannual (May & November) peer-reviewed academic journal "dedicated to the study of contemporary popular music". It is published by Éditions Mélanie Seteun, a publishing association specialized in popular music. The journal has both French and English editions. Volume! was established in 2002 under the title Copyright Volume! by Gérôme Guibert, Marie-Pierre Bonniol, and Samuel Étienne, and obtained its current name in 2008. Étienne (Université de la Polynésie Française) was its first editor-in-chief (2002–2008), before Guibert (University of Paris III: Sorbonne Nouvelle) took over in 2008.

== See also ==
- History of music in Paris
