= J. Q. Louison =

French writer and poet

Jacqueline Quentin Louison
- Born: October 31, 1952 (age 73); Le Marin, Martinique
- Other names: J.Q. Louison
- Occupations: Writer, poet and teacher
- Website: https://jqlouison.wixsite.com/crocodile-trilogie

Jacqueline Quentin Louison or J.Q. Louison is a writer and poet from Martinique.

== Life ==
Born in 1952 in Le Marin, into an average family of ten children. She obtained various scholarships, which enabled her to get an education after gaining her baccalaureate, and she pursued higher education in English-speaking studies, in metropolitan France starting at age 18. For seven years, she worked in the biophysics laboratory at the Hôpital Henri-Mondor while taking courses at the University of Creteil. She met her future husband, an immigrant from the Ivory Coast, in 1975. A few years later, she returned to his native country with him.

In 1979, she moved to Abidjan where she lived for twenty-seven years. She earns a degree from the University of Cocody and teaches at the Lycée Classique in Abidjan until 1985, when she becomes a librarian at the American Cultural Center of the United States Embassy in Abidjan. She works here for 16 years, promoted to Library Supervisor, and is afforded the opportunity to the United States, and pursues higher education in English. She then returns to the University of Cocody to teach English for a few years, then returns across the Atlantic in 2004.

She returned to Martinique in 2004, where she devoted herself to writing, publishing her first novel, Le canari brisé the following year. She holds a doctorate in English from University of the French West Indies and Guyana; she defended her thesis "The Puritans and the spiritual foundation of the United States of America" in December 2007. In more recent years, she has moved back to Touraine, France.

Jacqueline Louison was inspired to become a writer by watching Sugar Cane Alley as a young woman in 1983, which so moved her as a witness to history, she became convinced that she would do the same, as an author. Between Europe, Africa, America and the Caribbean, J.Q. Louison evokes a spirituality and a humanity influenced by cultures that nevertheless shape them.

== Work ==
Her works often describe an Afro-Caribbean society where the spiritual plays an important role. Her characters are charismatic but are subject to a tumultuous destiny that always brings them face to face with their origins. She evokes the imaginary real ("le réel imaginaire"), an expression of her own making, to explain the precision with which she describes parallel or fantastic worlds in her works, in a style reminiscent of René Barjavel or the evocation of the spiritual in the novels of Toni Morrison.

Louison has said the following of her idea:

"Vous seriez surpris de voir comme la nature humaine se révèle à travers ses paroles, ses actes, les faits divers… Puis l’imaginaire prends le relais et met en avant les personnages des romans, c'est "le réel imaginaire" ! Chacun prend alors sa part de vérité au regard de ses expériences…"

Translation:

"You would be surprised to see how human nature reveals itself through words, actions, news... Then the imaginary takes over and brings the characters of the novels to the forefront, it's "the imaginary real"! Each person then takes on his or her share of truth in the light of his or her experiences..."

The work that best exemplifies this concept is her science fiction trilogy, The Murdered Crocodile, though the novel The Broken Canary was the first appearance of this idea in her writing.

=== Musical setting ===
In 2009, artist Christina Goh accompanied the publication of J.Q. Louison's volume of poems, 'Emotions' with a piano-vocal recital of the songs featured in her single "3 emotions".

== Publications ==
- 2005 Le canari brisé (novel)
- 2006 Le crocodile assassiné (novel)
- 2011 La fondation spirituelle des États-Unis d'Amérique (Doctoral thesis, summa cum laude - Université des Antilles et de la Guyane)
- 2009 Emotions (collection of poems)
- 2010 Cicatrices (short story collection)
- 2011 Le poète est un peintre (collection of poems)
- 2012 L'ère du serpent - Le crocodile assassiné volume 2 (novel)
- 2014 Le triomphe des crocodiles - Le crocodile assassiné volume 3 (novel)
- 2014 Vision de l’aurore de félicité (collection of poems)
- 2021 The She King (novel)
