= Sonneur =

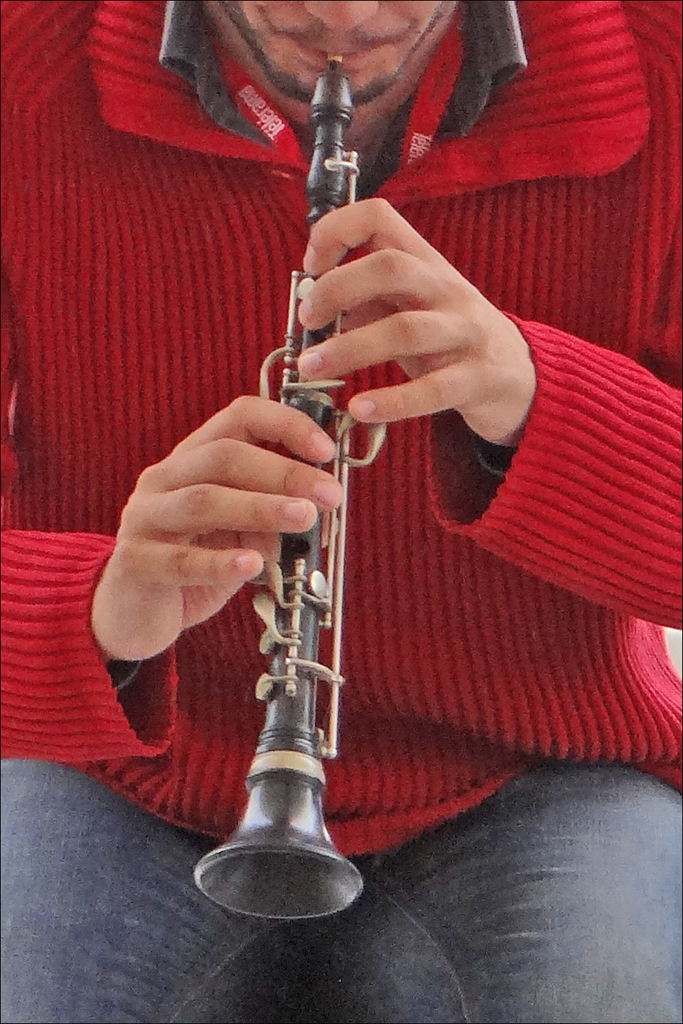
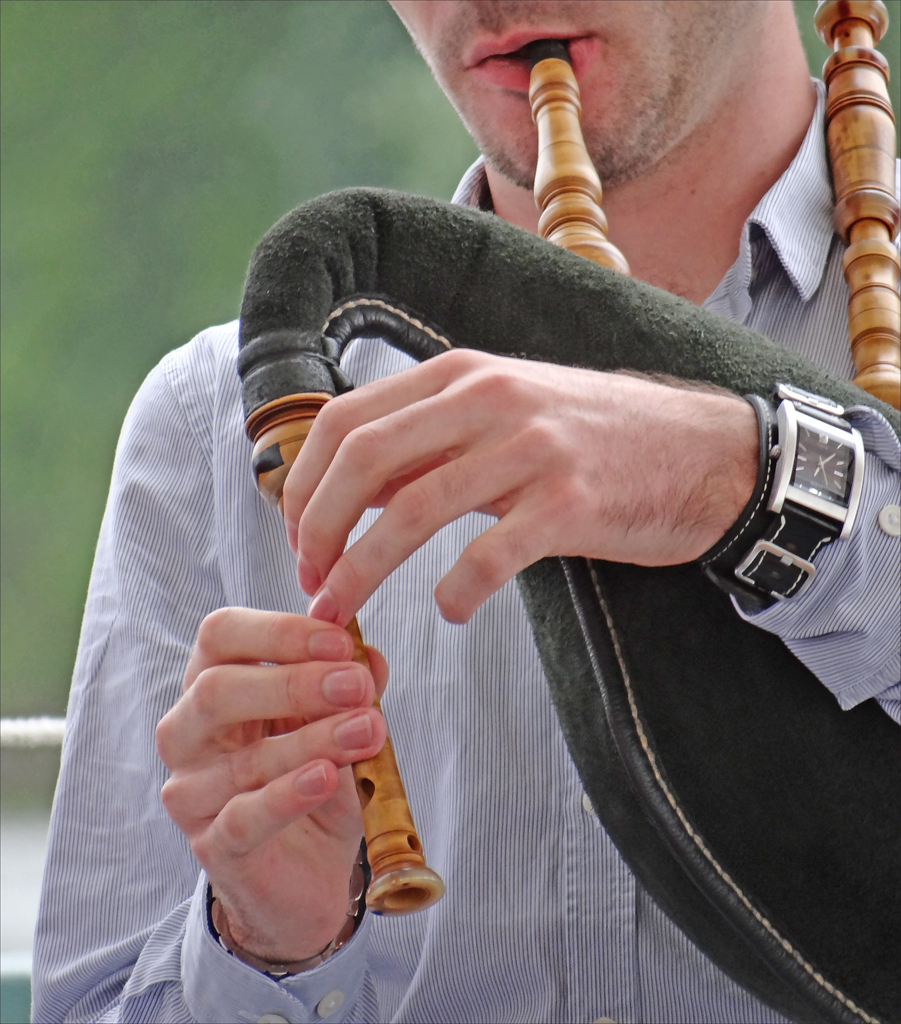
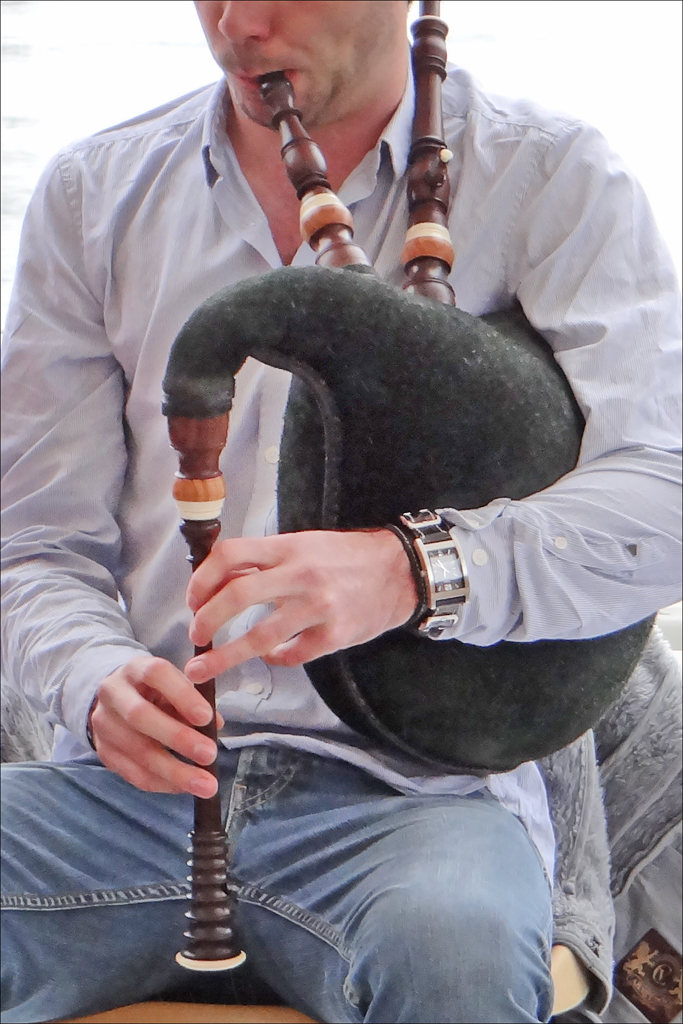
Sonneur of Bombarde, Biniou kozh, and Veuze

A sonneur – or, in Breton, soner (plural: sonerien) – is a player of traditional music in Brittany: i.e., someone who plays the bombarde, biniou (Breton bagpipe), or clarinet; as distinct from a kaner, or traditional singer.
