= Saint Vincent (musician) =

French musician (born 1976)

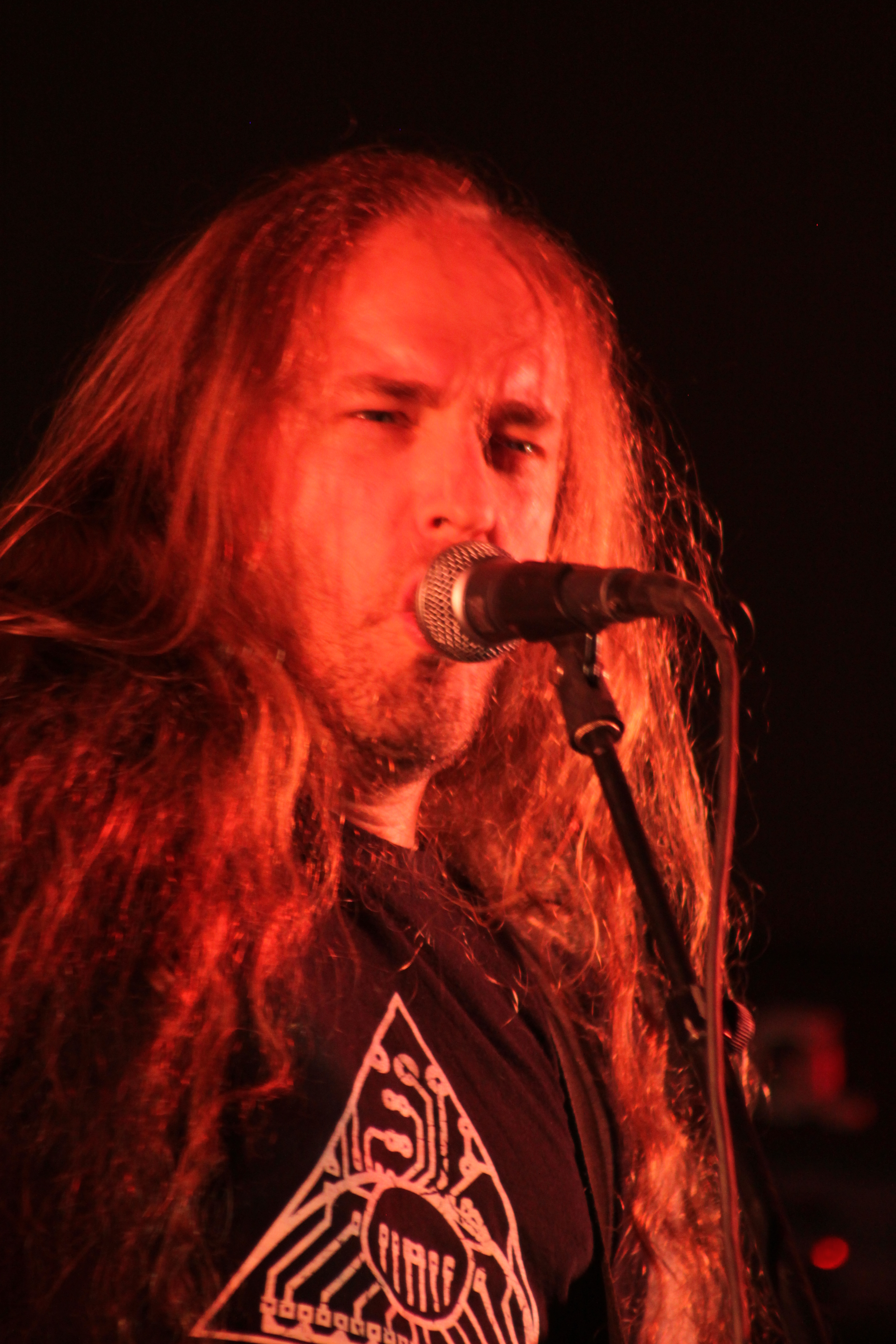
- Saint Vincent performing at Hellfest 2014

Background information
- Born: 8 August 1976 (age 50)
- Origin: Montreuil, Seine Saint Denis, France
- Genres: Industrial black metal, black metal, death metal
- Occupation: Musician
- Instruments: Vocals, guitar, bass, programming
- Years active: 1994–present

Saint Vincent (born 8 August 1976) is a French musician who created the industrial black metal band Blacklodge in 1998 in which he is the lead vocalist, guitarist and machine programmer. He is also the lead vocalist of the Parisian black/death metal band Vorkreist, and plays the guitars and the bass in the French black metal band the Arrival of SataN. His early influences are Megadeth and Darkthrone.

== Discography ==
=== Blacklodge ===
- Login:SataN (2003)
- >SolarKult< (2006)
- T/ME (2010)
- Machination (2012)

=== Vorkreist ===
- Sickness Sovereign (2009)
- Sigil Whore Christ (2012)

=== The Arrival of SataN ===
- Darkness Dealer (2003)
- Vexing Verses (2009)

=== Other appearances ===
- Merrimack ex-live vocalist
- Loudblast author of Hazardous Magic lyrics from the album Frozen Moments Between Life and Death (2011)
- Hyena Hyena EP (Lennart The Lycanthrope outro) (2007)
- Burn Paris Burn movie original soundtrack (2009)
- Secrets of the Moon Privilegivm special limited edition (Black Halo remix by Blacklodge) (2009)
- Pavillon Rouge Solmeth Pervitine (intro speech on Les membranes vertes de l'espace) (2012)
- Faust, guitarist, first local band from Grenoble (1994/1998).
