= Blacklodge =

French industrial black metal band

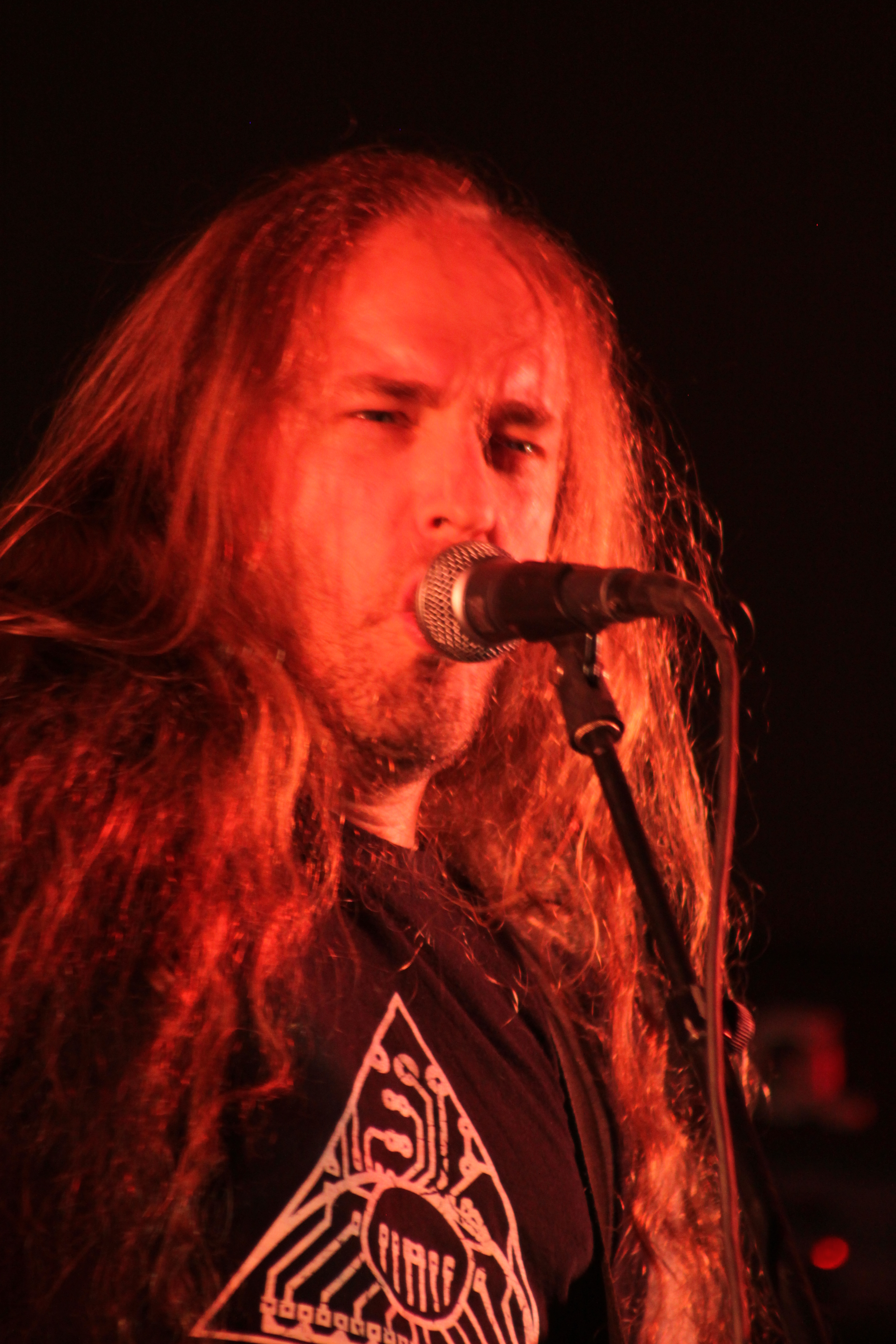
- Saint Vincent at Hellfest 2014

Background information
- Origin: Grenoble, France
- Genres: Industrial black metal
- Years active: 1998–present
- Labels: Blazing, End All Life, Season of Mist
- Members: Saint Vincent; AcidJess; Narcotic
- Past members: Silence; Diam's
- Website: loginsatan.org

Blacklodge is an industrial black metal band from France, founded in 1998 by Saint Vincent in Grenoble. The band's name is taken from a fictional place known as the Black Lodge in the David Lynch series Twin Peaks.

== History ==
=== Early years and Login:Satan (1998–2005) ===
The band was created in 1998 by Saint Vincent. The band's influences are Mysticum and Dodheimsgard, though Saint Vincent names the German band Traumatic Voyage as one of his main influences.

They played their first live gig in Grenoble as openers for Impaled Nazarene. In 2004 they toured with Aborym and Corpus Christii.

=== Solarkult (2005–2010) ===
A new era started for the band with their cooperation with Tore Stjerna from the Necromorbus Studio, where they recorded their album Solarkult. With this opus they signed with the French underground label End All Life. In 2007, Silence left the band and was replaced by Narcotic before their European tour with the bands Horna and Vorkreist.

=== T/ME (2010–2012) ===
A collaboration with the Austrian band Abigor resulted in a split album. T/ME, 3rd level Initiation : Chamber of Downfall was released by End All Life.

=== Machination (2012–present) ===
The band signed with Season of Mist in 2012.

== Members ==
=== Current line-up ===
- Saint Vincent – vocals, guitar, machines (1998–present)
- AcidJess – bass (2002–present)
- Narcotic – guitar (2007–present)

=== Former members ===
- Silence – guitar (1999–2007)
- Diam's – bass (1999–2002)

== Discography ==
=== Studio albums ===
Year	Name	Subtitle	Label
2003	Login:Satan	1st level Initiation : Chamber of Darkness	Blazing Productions
2006	Solarkult	2nd level Initiation : Chamber of Illumination	End All Life
2010	T/ME	3rd level Initiation : Chamber of Downfall	End All Life
2012	Machination	4th level Initiation : Chamber of Control	Season of Mist

=== Demos ===
- InnerCells (1999)
- Prince of Dark Cellars (1999)
- Login:Satan demo (2001)

=== Music videos ===
- 1999: "Prince of Dark Cellars" (directed by Marc Canlers)
- 2010: "Vector G" (directed by Pierre Reynard)
