= Sabbathical Flesh Possession =

Studio album by Vorkreist
- Released: 11 September 2003
- Genre: Death metal
- Length: 36:45
- Label: Xtreem Music

Vorkreist chronology
Sermons of Impurity (2001)	Sabbathical Flesh Possession (2003)	Sublimation XXIXA (2006)

Sabbithical Flesh Possession is the second studio album by the French death metal band Vorkreist. It was released on Xtreem Music in 2003.

== Track listing ==
No.	Title	Length
1.	"Intro: Open the Gates of Flesh"	0:47
2.	"Dead and Devoted"	3:21
3.	"Purified in Hellfire"	3:45
4.	"Tread on the Cross"	3:56
5.	"At the Side of the Beast"	3:08
6.	"Sabbathical Flesh Possession"	4:23
7.	"Thorn Torment the Impaled"	2:41
8.	"Infernal Communion"	5:09
9.	"Iconophobia"	4:17
10.	"Dawn of Terror"	5:17
