= Association Sonneurs de Veuzes =

The Association Sonneurs de Veuzes (French: "Association of Veuze [bagpipe] Players") was formed in Nantes in 1976 for players of the veuze, a traditional bagpipe of Brittany and Nantes.

The society promotes the knowledge of playing and the history of the instrument.

Its founders included Roland Le Moigne, and it was later led by Thierry Moreau.
