= Veuze =

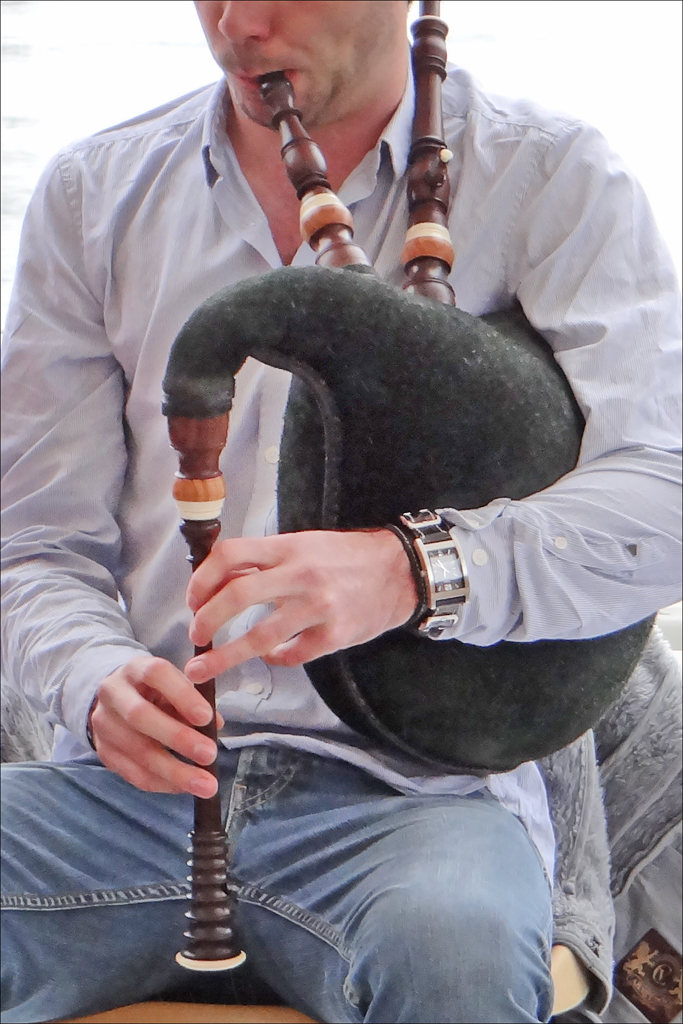
Sonneur de veuze, a bagpiper in Brittany playing veuze.

The veuze is a Breton bagpipe found traditionally in southeastern Brittany and in the northern part of the Vendée, particularly around Nantes, the Guérande peninsula, and Basse-Vilaine. The veuze has been mentioned in writing dating to the 16th century, and is thought to be the oldest of the Breton bagpipes. The veuze is thought to be the antecedent of the biniou.

The Association Sonneurs de Veuzes (French: "Association of Veuze [bagpipe] Players") was formed in Nantes in 1976.

== Construction ==
The veuze consists of a bag (poche), blowpipe (sutell), a double-reeded chanter (levriad), and a single-reeded drone or drones (bourdon). The levriad is generally pitched in A or G , but can also be found in D, B♭ and C .
