= Christina Goh =

French singer, songwriter and poet (born 1977)

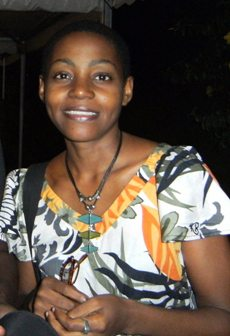
- Goh in Gros-Morne, Martinique

Background information
- Also known as: The Afro-Blues Black Pearl
- Born: 14 July 1977 (age 47); 12th arrondissement of Paris, Paris, France
- Genres: Jazz; World music Chanson
- Occupation(s): Singer, songwriter, poet
- Instrument: Voice
- Website: christinagoh.com

Christina Goh is a French singer, songwriter and poet.

== Biography ==
The daughter of an Ivorian father and a mother from Martinique, Christina Goh was born in 1977 in Paris, France. She spent her life in Côte d'Ivoire and went to university in France but finally chose a musical career at the age of 23. Her first album was recorded in 2003, however, it is only in 2009, that the single "Réputation de peine" (Reputation of sorrow), released and sold in Martinique, was played on French-speaking radios of Japan, Greece, Andorra, Brazil and Quebec.

Christina Goh, named "La perle noire de l'afro-blues" (Afro-blues black pearl), puts together African, Caribbean and blues styles, but she remains at the same time faithful to French song texts.

In 2008, she created the Christina Goh Concept, which is an atypical trio: djembe, guitar, voice or piano, guitar, voice. The djembe is always the rhythmic point of the presentation. Its fusion with the electric guitar, whose blues accents translate the poetic characteristic of the concept, is atypical. In 2010, the musical album Christina Goh Concept was recorded in French West Indies and sold by the label ICE Consulting in Martinique. The ten-titled album on Plaza Mayor Company Ltd label made the world discover the concept on the web.

Christina Goh wrote two collections of poems. Le concept en poèmes (The concept in poems), her second collection, is what she named "a new experiment", where she explains in poems, the ten universes of the ten songs of the album Christina Goh Concept.

In 2010, she was in concert in Avignon Festival Off, named "the greatest theater of the world" in France, invited by the Laurette Theater.

== Awards ==
- 2015 : 14th Independent Music Awards Nominee - Eclectic EP category

== Discography ==
- Tranquille (album) 2003
- Métissée chocolat (single) 2007
- Eveil (EP) 2008
- 3 Emotions (EP) 2009
- Christina Goh Concept (album) 2010
- N'oublie pas (single) 2012
- Fusion (album) 2012
- Invisible EP (EP) 2014
- 14 Melodies (Live at Le Petit Faucheux France) (album CD/DVD) 2015

== Bibliography ==
- Le chant des coeurs (ISBN 978-2-7466-0747-7) 2009
- Le concept en poèmes (ISBN 978-2-9536-5530-8 ) 2010
- Fort, utile et beau (ISBN 978-2-8106-2195-8 ) 2011
- Du noir et blanc à la couleur (ISBN 978-2-322-03038-5 ) 2013
- 14 Mélodies en confidences poétiques (ISBN 978-2-322-01987-8) 2015

== See also ==
- Music of France
