= Vorkreist =

French blackened death metal band

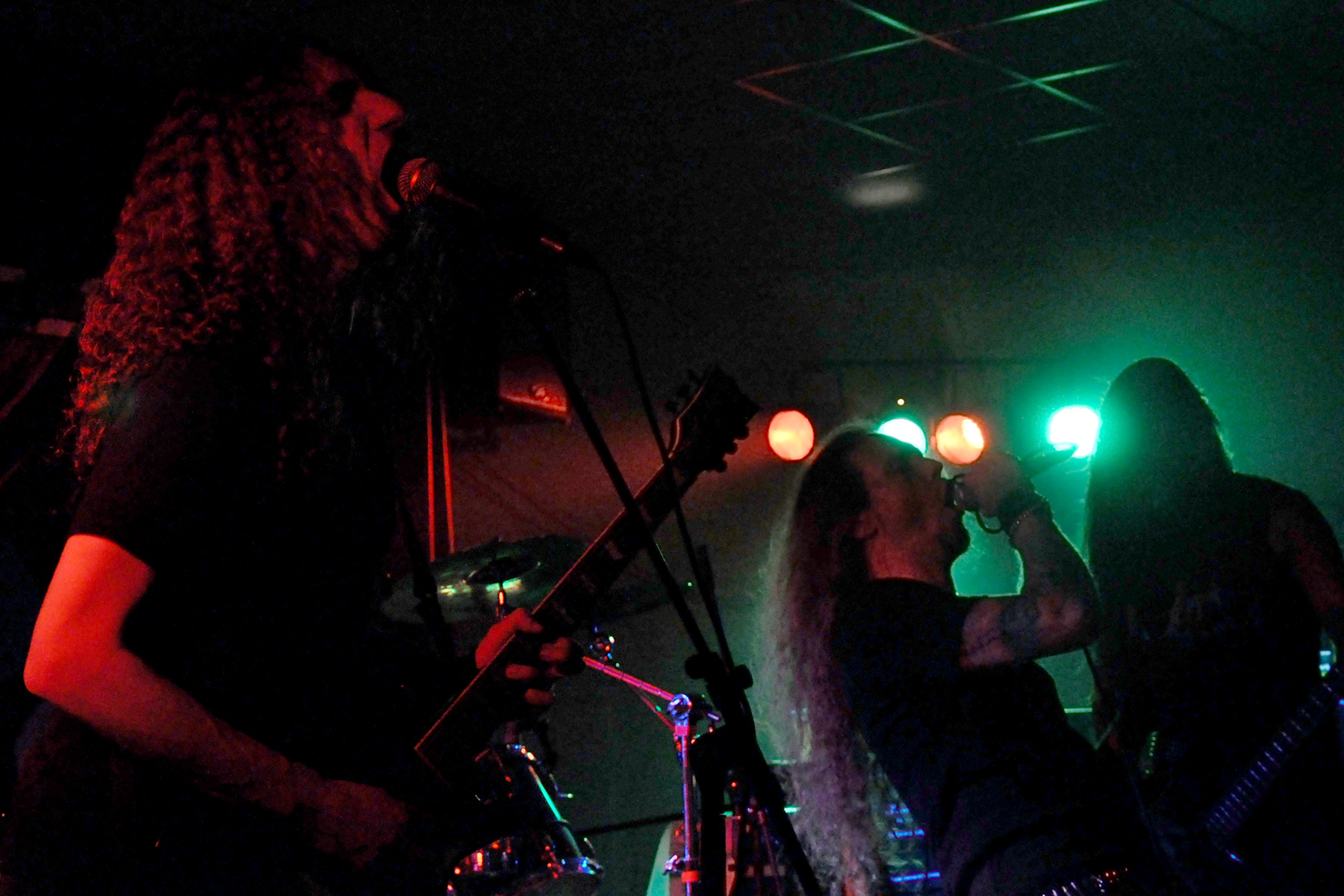
- Vorkreist in 2009

Background information
- Origin: Paris, France
- Genres: Blackened death metal
- Years active: 1999–present
- Label: Xtreem music
- Members: Saint Vincent; AK; EsX; LSK; D.Terror
- Past members: SohR-KaSM; Silmaeth
- Website: evilness.com/vorkreist

Vorkreist is a French blackened death metal band based in Paris that shares members with the black metal bands Antaeus and Hell Militia. "Vorkreist" is a barbarism created by the band that supposedly means Antichrist.

== Biography ==
After a demo in 2001, Vorkreist released their first album, Sabbathical Flesh Possession, in 2003, to lukewarm reviews.

In 2006, they released their second album, Sublimation XXIXA, which received more positive reviews. They toured Europe in September 2007 with Blacklodge and Horna.

== Members ==
=== Current members ===
- Johannes "A.K." Judicaël – guitar (1999-)
- Dave "D. Terror" – drums (2005-)
- Hervé "EsX" – guitar (2007-)
- Saint Vincent – vocals (2009-)
- Narcotic – bass (2013-)

=== Former members ===
- Mihai aka Aseal – drums (1999–2004)
- Silmaeth – guitar (1999–2007)
- Andralath "Sohr-Khasm" Svartsinn – vocals (1999–2009)
- Marianne "LSK" Séjourné – bass (1999–2013; died 2013)

== Discography ==
Studio albums

Date of release	Title	Label
2001	Sermons of Impurity	Independent
2003	Sabbathical Flesh Possession	Xtreem music
2006	Sublimation XXIXA	Xtreem music
2009	Sickness Sovereign	Trendkill Recordings
2012	Sigil Whore Christ	Agonia Records
