= Binioù =

Type of bagpipe instrument

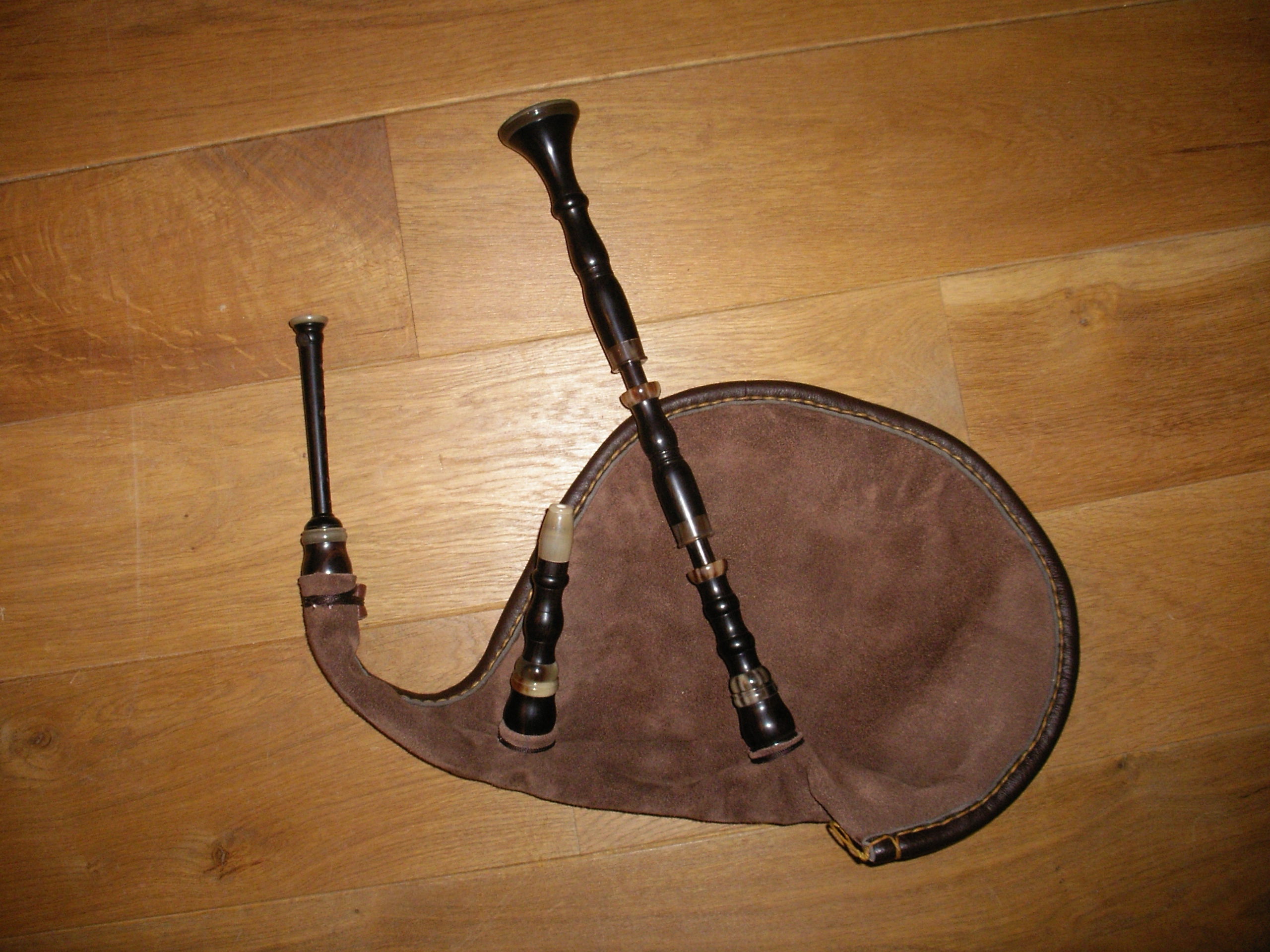
A biniou kozh

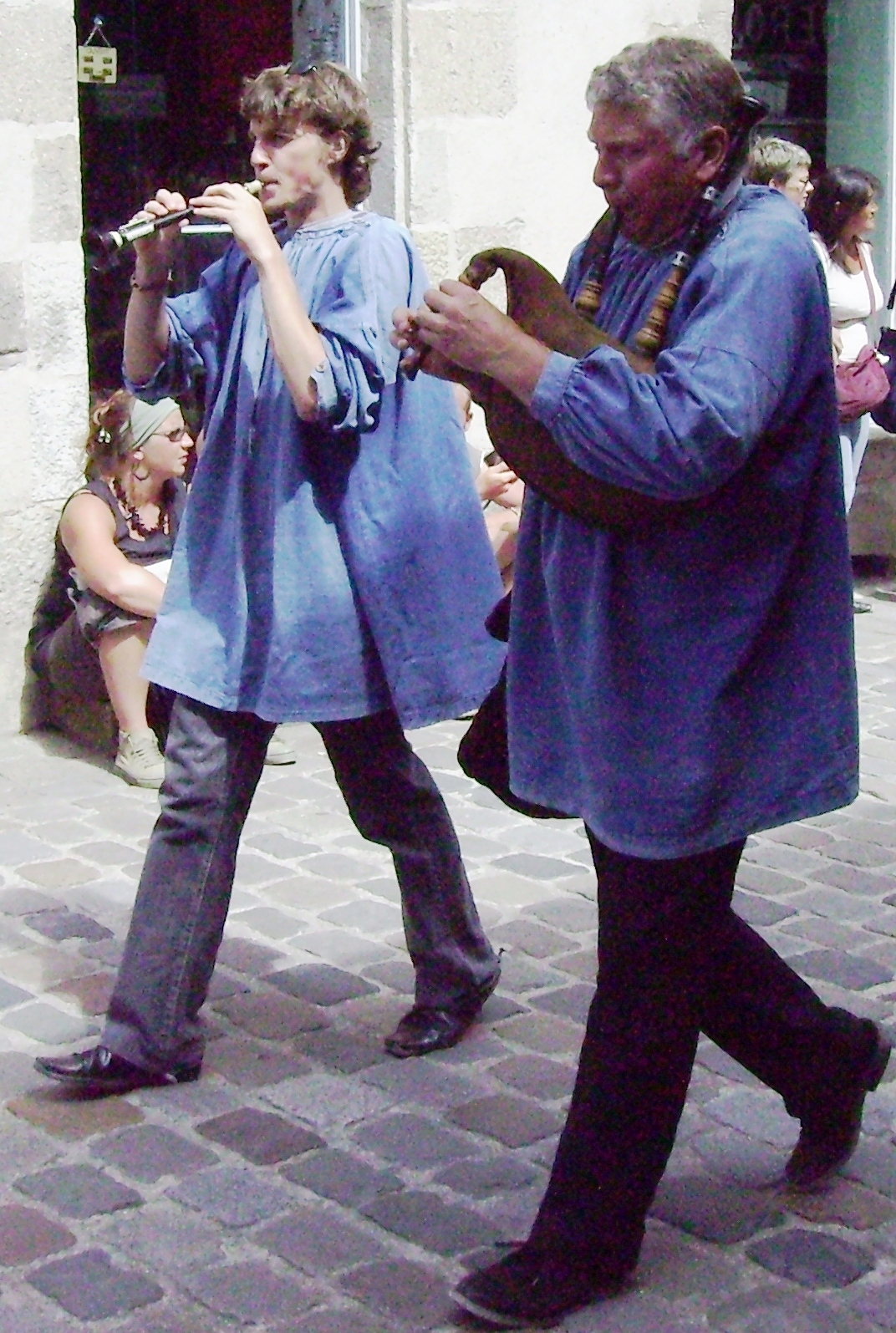
Two soners: a talabarder (to the left) and a biniaouer (to the right)

The binioù is a type of bagpipe. The word binioù means 'bagpipe' in the Breton language.

There are two bagpipes called binioù in Brittany: the traditional binioù kozh, or biniou-bihan (kozh means 'old' in Breton; bihan means 'small'), and the binioù bras, or binioù braz (bras means 'big'), which was brought into Brittany from Scotland in the late 19th century. The oldest native bagpipe in Brittany is the veuze, from which the binioù kozh is thought to be derived.

The binioù bras is essentially the same as the Scottish great Highland bagpipe; sets are manufactured by Breton makers or imported from Scotland or elsewhere.

The binioù kozh has a one octave scale, and is very high-pitched with a soprano sound; it is tuned to play one octave higher than the bombard which it accompanies. More traditional forms have a single drone, while modern instruments sometimes have two. In the old days the leather used for the bag was usually from a dog's skin, but this is nowadays replaced by synthetic materials or other leathers which are easier to procure, like cow or sheep.

Traditionally it is played in duet with the bombard, a double-reed instrument which sounds an octave below the binioù chanter, for Breton folk dancing. The binioù bras is typically used as part of a bagad band, although it is sometimes also paired with a bombard.
