= Bombard (musical instrument) =

Breton contemporary family of oboes

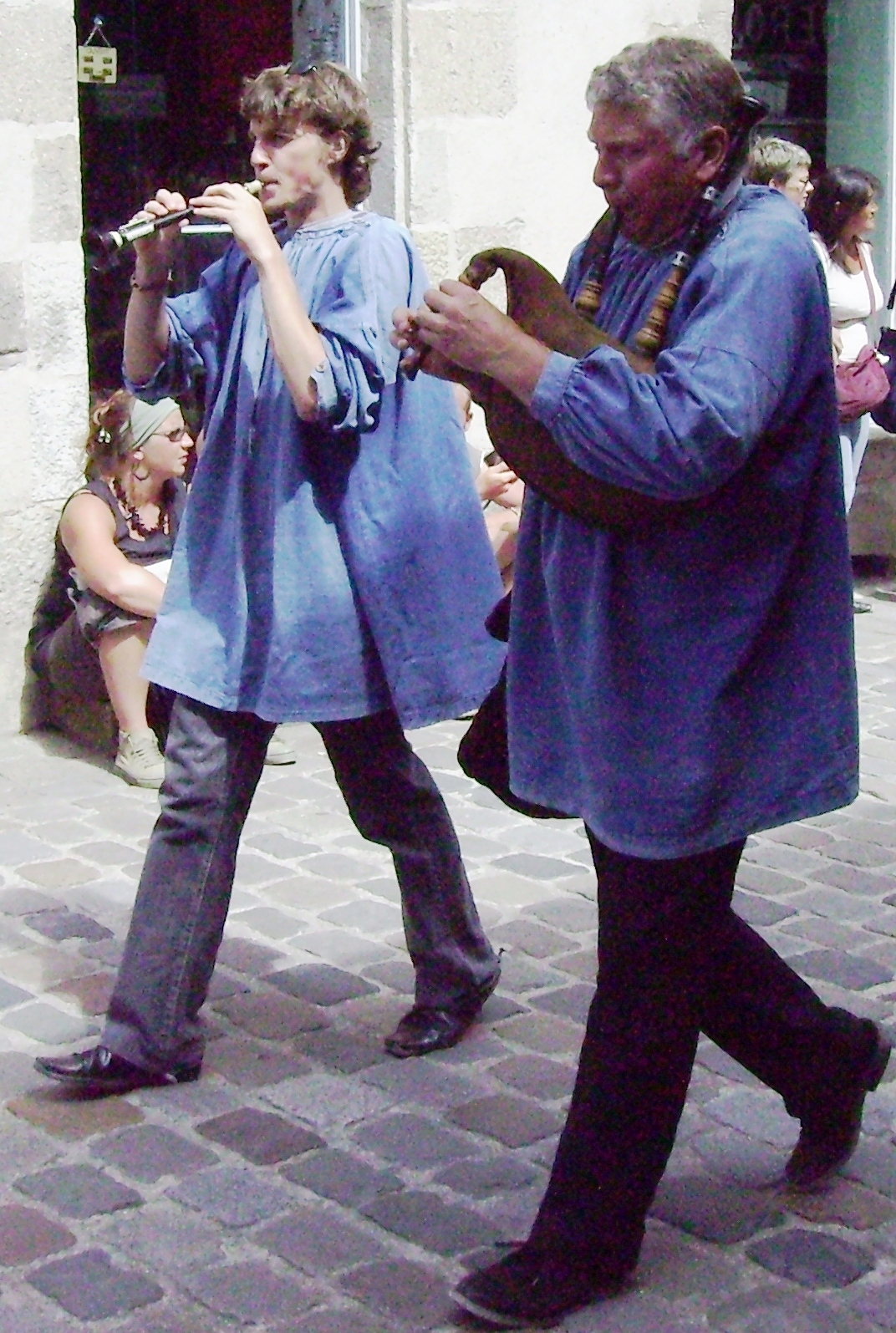
- Two Soner: a talabarder (left) and a biniaouer (right)

Woodwind instrument
- Other names: talabard, bombarde, ar vombard
- Classification: Aerophone; Non-free aerophone; Reed aerophone
- Hornbostel–Sachs classification: 422.112 (Double-reed instrument with conical bore)

Related instruments
- Oboe; Bassoon; Biniou

Breton bombard players, Strakonice, Czech Republic (2022).

The bombard (Breton: bombard, talabard, French: bombarde) is a contemporary family of oboes widely used to play traditional Breton music, where it is considered emblematic. A bombard player is known as a talabarder.

== The tradition: Sonneurs de Couple ==
Bombards in their most traditional setting are accompanied by a bagpipe called a biniou kozh ("old bagpipe"), which plays an octave above the bombard. The bombard calls, and the biniou responds. The bombard's relatively stiff reed requires enough lip and breath support that a talabarder cannot play a lengthy, sustained melody line. The biniou plays the melody continuously, while the bombard takes breaks, establishing a call-and-response pattern. Call-and-response remains a central aspect of Breton music regardless of the instruments used.

Prior to World War I, a given pair of Soners (musicians) would typically cover all of the weddings, funerals, and other social occasions within a given territory, which would be jealously guarded from other performers. This territorial aspect might very well extend to locale-specific repertoire, dances, and even to unique tuning of the instruments. This duet of bombard and bagpipe, sometimes accompanied by a drummer in past centuries, has been practiced for at least 500 years in Brittany in an unbroken tradition.

== Revival in the bagadoù ==
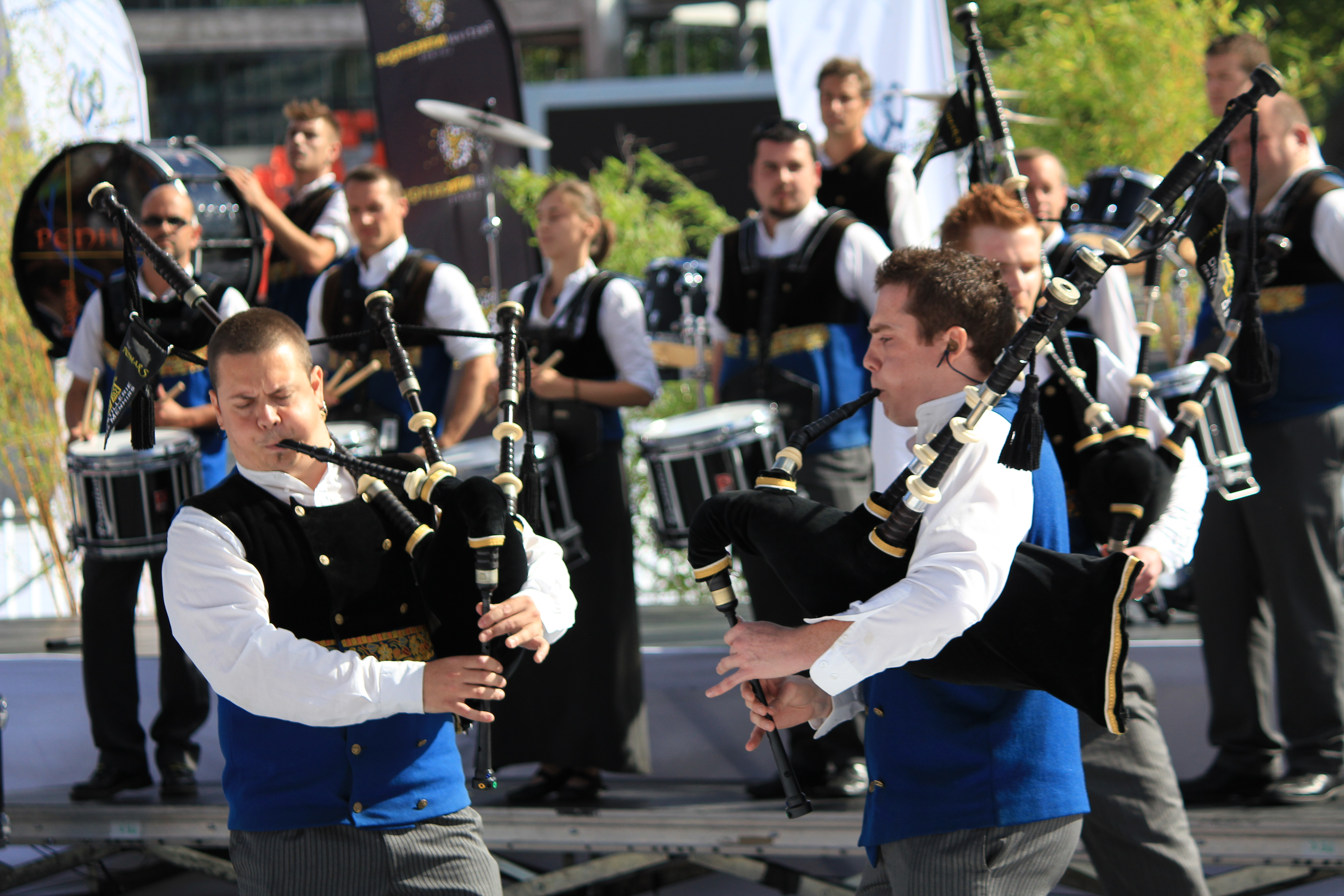
Bagad Penhars (2013).

In the first part of the 20th century, the number of players of bombards and biniou kozh decreased significantly. In some parts of Brittany from the beginning of the 20th century onwards into the revival period of the 1970s, the most popular sonneurs de couple were the paired ‘treujenn gaol’ clarinet and accompanying button accordion. In the late 1940s, the creation of the Bagad, a specifically Breton orchestra of bagpipes, bombards and drums, by figures such as Polig Monjarret and the organization Bodadeg ar Sonerion (Brotherhood of Musicians), offered a new role to the instrument.

Most towns in Brittany now have one or several Bagadoù (plural in Breton for Bagad), and they continually compete with each other in a series of annual tournaments and festivals. As the Bagad was a Breton take on the Scottish pipe band concept, the music initially performed was typically more martial in character. In the current day the Bagadoù almost exclusively play Breton dance music. The large number of bombard players in the Bagadoù has been a key factor in the successful popularization of the instrument over the decades. Another factor has been the revitalization of the traditional pairing of the bombard and biniou in the 1970s with the Breton cultural revival, thanks to the success of Alan Stivell (bombard by Christophe Caron) and the increasing popularity of both Fest Noz dances and traditional music competitions.

== Organology ==
Bombards are woodwind instruments, and broadly considered are members of the oboe family. While it has a powerful sound, vaguely resembling a trumpet, the bombard is not a shawm.

The revered musician and teacher Christophe Caron wrote on the jacket of his bombard-and-piano duet recording Gwenrann (2000), with pianist Christian Metayer: "The quality of traditional musicians proves it: it is impossible today to consider the Bombard just a simple, thunderously loud instrument with only approximate intonation. My wish is to show other sounds and the concert reality of this ancient oboe. In this sense, the piano gives its full measure to assist in exploring this potential."

In the ethnomusicological exhibition "Sonnez Bombardes, Résonnez Binious!" held at Chateau Kerjean in Northwestern Brittany from March 3 to November 7, 2012, the detailed tri-lingual (Breton, French, and English) large-format placard descriptions of the bombard flatly stated: "The bombard is descended from the Renaissance oboe and its design reflects the accumulated musical expertise from over the centuries."

Like other oboes, the bombard uses a brass staple as the basis for its double reed. Depending on the model, a conical or cylindrical outer layer of cork around the bottom section of the staple, similar to the staple of the conservatoire oboe, enables the reed to be easily and predictably placed with an airtight seal into the reed-socket at the top of the instrument. It is played as the oboe is played, with the reed placed between the lips, allowing for dynamic expression. The second octave is 'over-blown', achieved via increased lip and air pressure, or through the use of an octave key. Also like other oboes, the body of the instrument is made in sections which are assembled together at the joints to play. In smaller instruments, the bell and body are separate, while larger instruments will also have a two-part body with a joint located between the left and right hand playing positions, as with many other contemporary woodwinds.

Historical and simpler instruments are diatonically based, with a typical range of about an octave and a half. Bombards range from large bass models approaching an English horn to tiny instruments playing a high C diatonic scale. Typically, the smaller the instrument, the more penetrating the tone. The most common keys are intermediate in size. B♭ instruments are used with the large Bagad bands, while instruments in A and G are popular for use in bombard-biniou duos and also with Fest Noz bands using mixed instrumentation such as guitars, accordions, and violins.

== Contemporary Developments ==
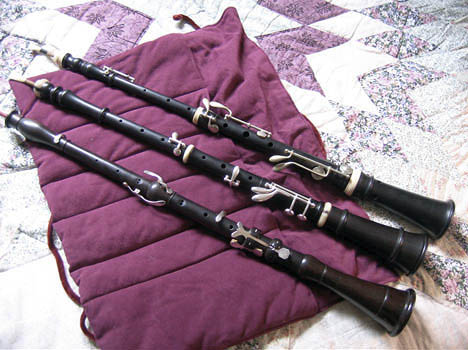
Left: a classical oboe by Harry Vas Dias. Center: a 'piston' oboe by Youenn Le Bihan. Right: a "hautbois rustique" oboe by Hervieux & Glet.

The bombard has been in constant evolution in recent decades. Contemporary bombards may have sophisticated keywork, resulting in fully chromatic instruments. Milder versions tending to a romantic-era oboe sound such as Youenn Le Bihan's "pistoñ" (a baroque oboe/bombard hybrid) have been developed for use in mixed ensembles, resulting in completely new sounds and realms of expression.

The Bagadoù have created a substantial market for quality instruments and associated supplies, and the resulting large number of players exploring various realms of activity has resulted in ongoing development and refinement of every aspect of the instrument. Bombard activities support a class of professional musicians, professional instrument makers, and even professional reed makers manufacturing large quantities of standardized reeds. Publishers market numerous tutorial books, videos, and recordings.

Today, the bombard is played in combination with a wide variety of instruments (biniou, veuze, Scottish Highland pipes, saxophone, piano, organ, clarinet/treujenn gaol, violin, flute, guitar, bass, and percussion) in Fest Noz groups as well as in ensembles of many other styles – from classical to folk, rock, pop, punk, metal – in arrangements of traditional Breton dance tunes or in new compositions.

== Musicians and instrument makers ==
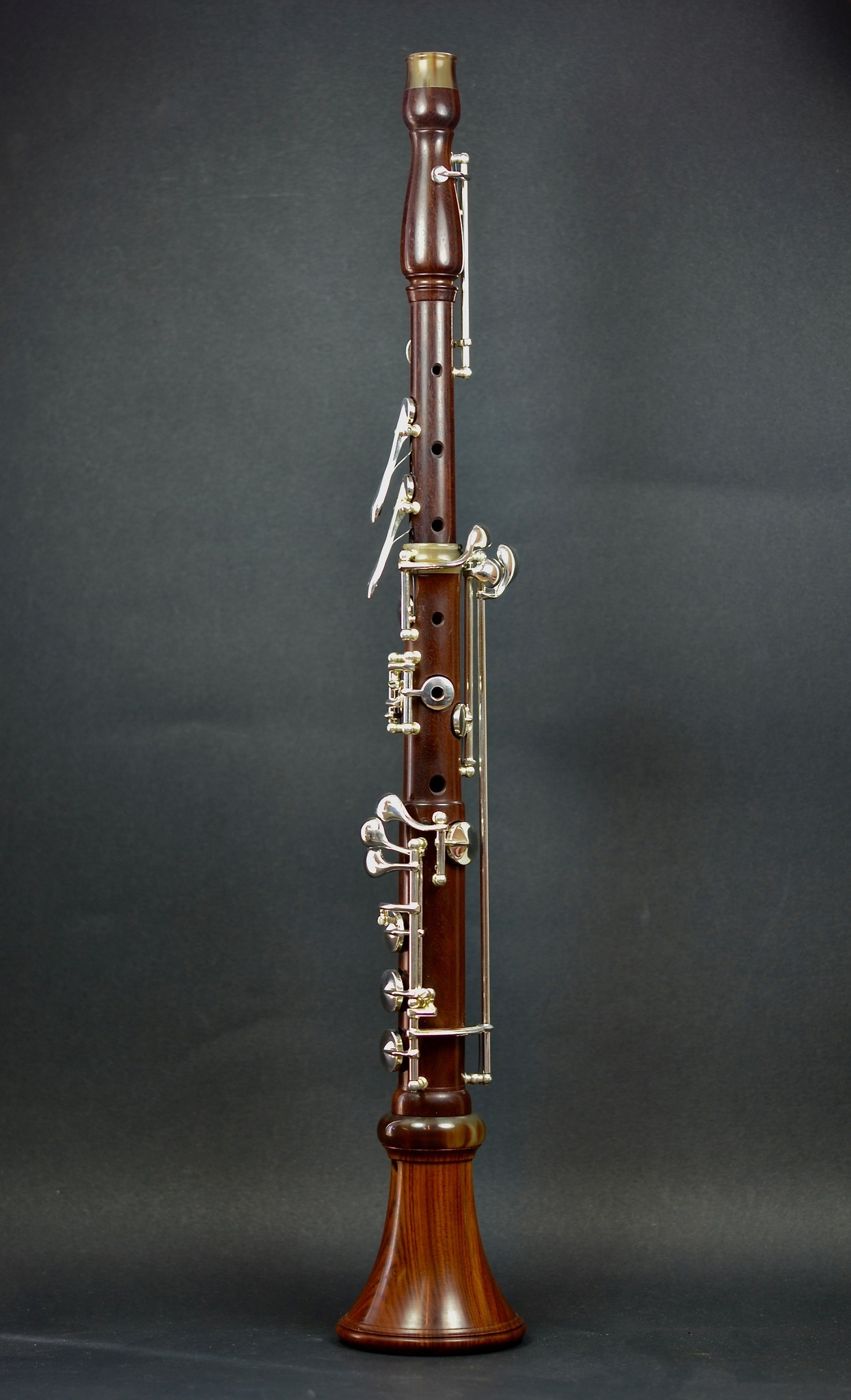
bombard (Breton oboe).

=== Some talabarders ===
- Mathieu Sérot
- Gildas Moal
- Christian Faucheur
- Georges Epinette
- André Le Meut..
- Jorj Botuha
- Christophe Caron
- Cyrille Bonneau
- David Pasquet
- Josick Allot
- Ronan Le Dissez
- Odran Plantec
- Jean Baron
- 'Titom'
- Stéphane Hardy
- Serge Riou
- Yann Kermabon
- Youenn Le Bihan
- Ivonig Le Mestre
- Erwan Hamon
- Jil Lehart (Gilles Lehart)

=== Some instrument makers ===
- Tudual Hervieux
- Youenn Le Bihan
- Yvon Le Coant
- Jil Lehart (Gilles Lehart)
- Éric Ollu
- Rudy Le Doyen

=== Some recordings ===
- "Evit Dañsal" Jil Lehart and Daniel Féon
- "An disput" Gildas Moal and René Chaplain
- "Plijadur" Jorj Botuha, with Pascal Guingo, Philippe Quillay, Pascal Marsault
- "An deiziou kaer" Storvan

== Films ==
- Of Pipers and Wrens (1997). Produced and directed by Gei Zantzinger, in collaboration with Dastum. Lois V. Kuter, ethnomusicological consultant. Devault, Pennsylvania: Constant Spring Productions.
- 15 Vloaz Moal-Chaplain (2008). Produced by Dastum Bro Dreger. Production and mastering by Thibaut Colin and Philippe Ollivier. Sold in conjunction with the hardcover book 'bombarde et biniou' by Ifig Castel, Editions Dastum.

== See also ==
- Bassoon
- Biniou
- Oboe
