= A Gift for the Obsessed =

Studio album by the Absence
- Released: March 23, 2018
- Recorded: Mid-2016 - March 2017
- Studios: Smoke & Mirrors Productions in Spring Hill, Florida, USA
- Genre: Melodic death metal
- Length: 57:28
- Label: M-Theory Audio
- Producers: Jeramie Kling, Taylor Nordberg

The Absence chronology
Enemy Unbound (2010)	A Gift for the Obsessed (2018)	Coffinized (2021)

Singles from A Gift for the Obsessed
- 1. "Septic Testament" Released: July 22, 2016; 2. "A Gift for the Obsessed" Released: January 20, 2018; 3. "Misery Trophies" Released: March 14, 2018

Professional ratings
Review scores
Source	Rating
Dead Rhetoric	8.5/10
Metal Hammer Germany	5/7
Metal.de	6/10
Powermetal.de	6.5/10

A Gift for the Obsessed is the fourth studio album by melodic death metal band the Absence. It was released on March 23, 2018, through M-Theory Audio. It is the only album with guitarist Joey Concepcion as a full-time member, their first album with guitarist Taylor Nordberg, and the first with drummer Jeramie Kling since their 2007 album Riders of the Plague.

== Track listing ==
No.	Title	Length
1.	"A Gift for the Obsessed"	4:07
2.	"Misery Trophies"	6:02
3.	"The Forging"	5:48
4.	"Thought & Memory"	5:56
5.	"Celestial Hysteria"	5:38
6.	"Septic Testament"	5:14
7.	"The Alpha Illusion"	4:02
8.	"Fear of Existence"	4:34
9.	"You Can't Bring Me Down" (Suicidal Tendencies cover) (featuring Björn "Speed" Strid)	5:38
10.	"Idle Thrones"	10:29
Total length:		57:28

"Idle Thrones" ends at 4:59, followed by five minutes of silence and a 30-second hidden voicemail track.

== Personnel ==
- Jamie Stewart - vocals
- Joey Concepcion - guitar
- Taylor Nordberg - guitar, bass on track 6
- Mike Leon - bass
- Jeramie Kling - drums, backing vocals
