= Coffinized =

Studio album by the Absence
- Released: June 25, 2021
- Recorded: May 2020
- Studios: Smoke & Mirrors Productions in Spring Hill, Florida, USA
- Genre: Melodic death metal
- Length: 50:05
- Label: M-Theory Audio
- Producers: Jeramie Kling, Taylor Nordberg

The Absence chronology
A Gift for the Obsessed (2018)	Coffinized (2021)	The Absence (2024)

Singles from Coffinized
- 1. "Choirs of Sickness" Released: March 31, 2021; 2. "Coffinized" Released: May 15, 2021; 3. "Black Providence" Released: June 2, 2021; 4. "Faith in Uncreation" Released: August 21, 2021

Professional ratings
Review scores
Source	Rating
Dead Rhetoric	9/10
Eternal Terror	5/6
Metal1.info	9/10
Time for Metal	8.9/10

Coffinized is the fifth studio album by melodic death metal band the Absence. It was released on June 25, 2021, through M-Theory Audio.

== Track listing ==
No.	Title	Length
1.	"Coffinized"	4:18
2.	"Future Terminal"	4:19
3.	"Choirs of Sickness"	4:48
4.	"Radiant Devastation"	5:04
5.	"Cathedral Dawn"	4:31
6.	"Black Providence"	5:14
7.	"Discordia"	3:35
8.	"Treacherous"	4:23
9.	"The Consuming Nocturne"	3:59
10.	"Aperture Expands"	3:38
11.	"Faith in Uncreation"	6:16
Total length:		50:05

== Personnel ==
- Jamie Stewart - vocals
- Taylor Nordberg - guitars
- Mike Leon - bass
- Jeramie Kling - drums
- Joey Concepcion - additional guitar on track 3, 4, 10, and 11
