= Killing Addiction =

American deathgrind band

- Also known as: K.A.
- Origin: Florida
- Genre: death metal
- Years active: 1989–1994, 2006–present
- Labels: Seraphic Decay, JL America, XTREEM Music, Inverse Dogma
- Members: Chris Wicklein; Devon McDonough; Chris York; Pat Bailey
- Website: killingaddiction.bandcamp.com

Killing Addiction is a death metal band that originated in the late 1980s-early1990s music scene. Their politically and philosophically-charged style combines influences from death metal (Death, Possessed, Morbid Angel, Atheist), grindcore (Napalm Death, Carcass), and thrash (Slayer, Sacred Reich, and Kreator).

== Biography ==
=== 1989-1992 ===
Official Killing Addiction logo by Brent Milby

In 1989, Chris Wicklein and brothers Chad and Pat Bailey formed Killing Addiction, one of the few bands of the time to introduce death metal to the central Florida area. In 1990, drummer Chris Ballina joined them, and they recorded the four-song Legacies of Terror demo tape at Titan Studios, which helped establish their presence in the underground tape-trading and fanzine scene.

As a result of the Legacies recording, the following year came the release of their Necrosphere 7-inch vinyl EP, on Seraphic Decay records - a label that initiated many death metal bands, such as Incantation, Gorephobia, Derketa, Sinister, and more. This recording was also made at Titan Studios, but included atmospheric keyboard arrangements that hinted at new directions. Necrosphere was the final recording with Ballina, who left to pursue other interests.

In 1992, drummer Chris York joined the band. Two months later, Killing Addiction recorded the full-length debut Omega Factor for JL America Records. Omega Factor was intended to be released on a start-up death metal label from the UK. After the recording was complete, the label ceased contact. The band had a full-length album and no label to release it.

=== 1993-1994 ===
After recording Omega Factor, the band made a deal with JL America. After working it into the production schedule, Omega Factor was released in early 1993, and distributed by Relativity. To support this recording, the band toured throughout the north, central, and south Florida areas, with death metal acts such as Obituary, Atheist, Incantation, Resurrection, Assuck, Paineater, Incision, and Equinox. After JL America folded, the band self-released the 1994 split EP Dark Tomorrow with Eterne De Sade. This was Killing Addiction's last recording during the formative years of Floridian death metal. York parted ways for personal reasons, and the remaining members decided the band had run its course. Before their departure in early 1994, Killing Addiction was voted the Best North Florida Band at the 4th Annual Tampa Bay Metal Awards (September, 1993).

=== 2006- ===
In early 2006, Killing Addiction reformed after 12 years. Their recorded Fall of the Archetypes, released as a full-length album on Xtreem Music (Spain), and as a limited-edition, six-song EP. Archetypes was recorded at DOW Studios (which also produced Morbid Angel's Heretic album), in Sefner, Florida, and Aeon Studios, in Ocala, Florida. This recording included new drummer Gabriel Lewandowski. Although some basic elements remained, they modernized some aspects of their sound. The result was faster and more aggressive and demonstrated improved musicianship and arrangement.

They did not play live until November 2013, when York returned. Since then, the band has played with Obituary, Exhumed, Gruesome, DRI, Destruction, Warbringer, Jungle Rot, Druid Lord, Exmortus, and others. In September 2014, Killing Addiction recorded the two-song EP When Death Becomes An Art, independently released on CD, which was licensed as a 7-inch EP on Inverse Dogma Records (Italy) in early 2015. The EP recorded and produced by Ray Helton at Helton Music, Ocala, Florida, and is a return to a style closer to Omega Factor with the improvements of Fall of the Archetypes.

A return to studio work in early 2016 led to the release of the Shores of Oblivion four-song EP, by Xtreem Music, licensed for a vinyl edition by Inverse Dogma Records. Founding member/guitarist Chad Bailey died on September 25, before the official release of Shores of Oblivion. His absence left a personal and creative void as the remaining members moved forward. Shores of Oblivion was named among the Best of 2016 by YouTube channel Infidel Amsterdam, and voted Best EP of 2016 at Metal-Rules.com.

In November, 2016, ex-Brutal Enemy and Magpits guitarist Mike Serden joined the band. A re-issue of Omega Factor was released by Xtreem Music on March 9, 2018, the 25th anniversary of the original release in 1993.

The band's third album, and first studio album in 11 years, Mind of a New God was released on June 1, 2021.

== Discography ==
Studio albums

- Omega Factor, 1993, JL America Records; reissue by XTREEM Music, 2018
- Fall of the Archetypes, 2010, XTREEM Music
- Mind of a New God, 2021, XTREEM Music

Extended plays

- Necrosphere, 1991, Seraphic Decay Records
- Dark Tomorrow, 1994, split EP
- When Death Becomes An Art, 2015, Inverse Dogma Records
- Shores of Oblivion, 2016, XTREEM Music; vinyl release by Inverse Dogma Records, 2017

Compilations

- Brutal Aggression, 1993, JL America Records
- Kiss of Death, 1995, EETME Records

Demos

- Legacies of Terror, 1990

== Music video ==
- Enter the Optimus (2025)

== Line-up ==
=== Current members ===
- Pat Bailey - vocals, bass (1989–1994, 2006–present)
- Chris Wicklein - guitars (1989–1994, 2006–present)
- Chris York - drums (1992–1994, 2013–present)
- Devon McDonough - guitars (2020–present)

=== Past members ===
- Mike Serden - guitars (2016–2018)
- Chad Bailey - guitars (1989–1994, 2006–2016; died 2016)
- Gabriel "Gabe" Lewandowski - drums (2009–2010)
- Chris Ballina - drums (1989–1992)
