= Bloodstrike =

Bloodstrike may refer to:

- Bloodstrike (Marvel Comics), a Marvel Comics supervillain
- Bloodstrike (Image Comics), an Image Comics superhero team
- Bloodstrike (band), an American death metal band
