= Let Chaos Prevail =

Studio album by Demigod
- Released: 2007
- Genre: Death metal
- Length: 40:33
- Label: Xtreem Music
- Producer: Henri Virsell and Demigod

Demigod chronology
Shadow Mechanics (2002)	Let Chaos Prevail (2007)

Let Chaos Prevail is a 2007 album by Demigod, released on Xtreem Music.

It was rated a 3.25 out of 5 by The Metal Crypt.

== Track listing ==
1. "Not Dead Enough" - 3:55
2. "Let Chaos Prevail" - 3:46
3. "Dark Turns Black" - 5:17
4. "Cult Of Sickness" - 3:59
5. "God Said Suffer" - 4:22
6. "To See The Last One Die" - 3:39
7. "Self-caged" - 3:16
8. "End Of Evolution" - 4:37
9. "The Uncrowned" - 3:39
10. "Baptized In Enmity" - 4:03

== Personnel ==
- Jussi Kiiski - guitars
- Tero Laitinen - guitars
- Tuomas Ala-Nissilä - vocals
- Tuomo Latvala - drums
- Sami Vesanto - bass
- Produced by Henri Virsell and Demigod
- Engineered and Mixed at Fantom Studio by Henri Virsell
- Assistant Engineer Timo Haakana
- Drums recorded at PopStudio by Mika Haapasalo
- Mastered at Finnvox Studios by Mika Jussila
- Cover design and layout by Jani Rämö
- Cover art by Russa Lynn Waldren
