= Eradikal Insane =

French death metal band

- Origin: Marseille, France
- Genres: Death metal, deathcore
- Years active: 2004–present
- Labels: M&O Office
- Members: Tomi; Nico; S Jtrom; Math
- Website: www.eradikal-insane.com, Eradikal Insane on Facebook

Eradikal Insane is a French death metal band that formed in Marseille, France, in 2004. The group consists of guitarists Nicolas and Tomi, vocalist Jtrom, drummer S and bassist Math.

According to members, the name of the band is a neologism to describe a very high level of craziness. The band has released three demos, one EP and one album. A new EP is WIP for 2026.

== Background ==
A digital single Born From Punishment was released on August 1, 2009.

On September 27, 2010, the band entered the Studio Hyperion in Marseille to record a first EP The Dementia Process. The band released The Dementia Process EP on April 16, 2011. This first effort received positive ratings by French and international webzines.

Following the release of the EP and promotional shows, Eradikal Insane launched its debut music video for the song God Bless You on September 23, 2012.

After almost two years of touring and writing, the band entered the studio to record its debut album Mithra on January 5, 2014, tentatively scheduled for late 2014 release. In the same year, the band played some shows in France and went on a ten days long tour in Russia. The album was postponed until 2015.

Back from a French tour including a show in Luxembourg during May 2015, Eradikal Insane announced Mithra to be out in September 2015, which will be followed by a tour in Canada in the same month.

== Influences ==
The band is influenced by bands such as The Black Dahlia Murder, Aborted, Misery Index, Gojira, Kronos and Whitechapel.

== Discography ==
Studio albums

- Mithra (2015)

EPs

- The Dementia Process (2011)
- Pareidolia Of Resilience (2026)

Demos

- Born From Punishment (2009)
- Deathcore United (2008)
- Liberated From Society (2006)

== Band members ==
Current

- Jtrom – vocals (2008–present)
- Nico – guitars (2004–present)
- Tomi – guitars (2025–present)
- Math – bass (2008-2012, 2025-present)
- S – drums (2025-present)

Former

- Flo - guitars
- Ben – bass
- Math – bass, backing vocals
- Pierre – bass
- Julo – vocals
- Thomas – vocals
- Golum – vocals
- R - drums
- Léo – drums
- Gus – drums
