= New Eyes (disambiguation) =

New Eyes is a 2014 album by Clean Bandit.

New Eyes may also refer to:

- "New Eyes", the title song of the Clean Bandit album
- "New Eyes" (Adam Lambert song), released in 2019
- "New Eyes", 1986 song by Ten Inch Men from the Hours in Pain EP
- New Eyes, annual playwriting festival at Mu Performing Arts since 1993
- New Eyes (EP), a 2024 EP by Havok
- "New Eyes", season 1 episode 6 of Hacks
- New Eyes for the Needy, a non-profit organization originally named, and still sometimes called, New Eyes

== See also ==
- Ojos nuevos (New Eyes), 1970–72 science program broadcast by TVE
- "Nuevos Ojos", song by Pistolera
