= Titan's Awakening =

Studio album by Kronos
- Released: August 2001
- Recorded: 2001
- Genre: Brutal death metal
- Length: 39:00
- Label: Xtreem Music
- Producer: Kronos and Jean-Lou

Kronos chronology
Titan's Awakening (2001)	Colossal Titan Strife (2004)

Titan's Awakening is the first album by the brutal death metal band Kronos released in 2001. This first edition of this album was produced by the band itself, and new edition of Titan's Awakening is released at the end of October the same year with a new cover designed by Deather (Angel Corpse, Gurkkhas, Vital Remains...) as well as a new graphical booklet.

== Track listing ==
All songs written by Kronos

1. "Mashkhith" - 3:52
2. "Sysiphe" - 2:47
3. "Enslaved By The Madness" - 4:10
4. "Bloodtower" - 3:53
5. "Eternal Mindtrap" - 5:03
6. "Outrance" - 0:05
7. "Sadistik Retribution" - 4:49
8. "Warmaggedawn" - 3:19
9. "Dismember" - 3:00
10. "Disease of God" - 4:08
11. "Demence of the Gnomish Warriors" - 0:42
12. "Supreme Nordik Reign" - 3:12

Total length: 39:00

== Credits ==
- Grams (guitar)
- Tems (guitar)
- Tom (bass and backup vocals)
- Mike (drums)
- Kristof (vocals)
