= The Absence (The Absence album) =

Studio album by the Absence
- Released: March 29, 2024
- Recorded: 2023
- Studios: Smoke & Mirrors Productions in Spring Hill, Florida, USA
- Genre: Melodic death metal
- Length: 37:30
- Label: Blood Blast Distribution
- Producers: Jeramie Kling, Taylor Nordberg

The Absence chronology
Coffinized (2021)	The Absence (2024)

Singles from The Absence
- 1. "The Silent Eye" Released: January 4, 2024; 2. "Communion Carbonized" Released: February 20, 2024

Professional ratings
Review scores
Source	Rating
Eternal Terror	4.5/6
Ghost Cult Magazine	7/10
Metalitalia.com	6.5/10
MetalSucks	3/5
My Global Mind	9/10

The Absence is the self-titled sixth studio album by melodic death metal band the Absence. It was released on March 29, 2024, through Blood Blast Distribution.

== Track listing ==
No.	Title	Length
1.	"Communion Carbonized"	3:30
2.	"The Silent Eye"	6:00
3.	"Vagrant Death"	3:48
4.	"Planetary Mortuary"	5:31
5.	"Surface of a Dead World"	1:35
6.	"Grieving Winds"	4:48
7.	"Fleshwalker"	3:42
8.	"Escape Artist"	4:38
9.	"Breeding Hysterics"	3:58
Total length:		37:30

== Personnel ==
- Jamie Stewart - vocals
- Taylor Nordberg - guitars, bass
- Jeramie Kling - drums
