= Colossal Titan Strife =

Studio album by Kronos
- Released: 25 December 2004
- Recorded: 12 August 2003 – 6 September 2003
- Studio: CCR Studios, Belgium
- Genre: Brutal death metal; melodic death metal
- Length: 42:36
- Label: Xtreem Music

Kronos chronology
| Titan's Awakening (2001) | Colossal Titan Strife (2004) | The Hellenic Terror (2007) |

Colossal Titan Strife is the second album from French brutal death metal band Kronos released on 25 December 2004. It was recorded, mixed and engineered by Kris Belaen at CCR Studios, Belgium from 12 August – 6 September 2003.

== Track listing ==
All tracks are written by Kronos.

| No. | Title | Length |
|---|---|---|
| 1. | "Mythological Bloodbath" | 0:40 |
| 2. | "Colossal Titan Strife" | 3:36 |
| 3. | "Submission" | 2:18 |
| 4. | "Opplomak" | 4:17 |
| 5. | "With Eaque Sword" | 4:47 |
| 6. | "Aeternum Pharaos Curse" | 4:09 |
| 7. | "Haterealm" | 2:55 |
| 8. | "Monumental Carnage" | 4:43 |
| 9. | "Phaeton" | 6:06 |
| 10. | "Kronos" | 3:30 |
| 11. | "Infernal Worms Fields" | 5:49 |
| Total length: | | 42:36 |

== Credits ==
- Grams (rhythm guitar)
- Richard (lead guitar)
- Tom (bass and backup vocals)
- Mike (drums)
- Kristof (vocals)
