= Slumber of Sullen Eyes =

Studio album by Demigod
- Released: 1992
- Recorded: July 1992 at Tico-Tico Studios (Kemi, Finland)
- Genre: Death metal
- Length: 48:07
- Label: Drowned Productions
- Producers: Demigod, Ahti Kortelainen

Demigod chronology
Slumber of Sullen Eyes (1992)	Shadow Mechanics (2002)

Slumber of Sullen Eyes is the debut album by the Finnish death metal band Demigod, released in 1992 on Drowned Productions.

== Release history ==
The album was out of print for years but has been re-released worldwide by Xtreem Music in 2006. This remastered 2006 version includes the 1991 demo Unholy Domain as a bonus. The colour scheme of the artwork is somewhat different on the re-release, emphasizing copper and dark brown instead of the red-green-black of the original. As even the re-release CD had become hard to get, it was repressed in 2009.

== Music ==
Slumber of Sullen Eyes has been noted for drawing influence from both the Swedish and Floridian variants of death metal. The album's instrumentation makes use of tremolo picking, tempo changes, "rigid" drumming, "groovy" rhythms, and bottom-heavy rhythm guitar work.

== Reception ==
The album has been called an "underground favorite" in the genre.

== Track listing ==
1. "Apocryphal (Intro)" – 0:22
2. "As I Behold I Despise" – 4:38
3. "Dead Soul" – 3:43
4. "The Forlorn" – 4:04
5. "Tears of God" – 5:14
6. "Slumber of Sullen Eyes" – 5:58
7. "Embrace the Darkness / Blood of the Perished" – 5:04
8. "Fear Obscures from Within" – 4:18
9. "Transmigration beyond Eternities" – 4:29
10. "Towards the Shrouded Infinity" – 3:39
11. "Perpetual Ascent" – 3:45
12. "Darkened" – 2:48 (Bonus)

== Personnel ==
- Esa Linden: Vocals, Guitars
- Jussi Kiiski: Guitars
- Tero Laitinen: Bass
- Seppo Taatila: Keyboards, Drums, Percussion
