= Conformicide =

Studio album by Havok
- Released: March 10, 2017
- Recorded: 2016
- Genre: Thrash metal
- Length: 57:49
- Label: Century Media
- Producer: Steve Evetts

Havok chronology
Unnatural Selection (2013)	Conformicide (2017)	V (2020)

Professional ratings
Review scores
Source	Rating
Currently Streaming	9.2/10 stars
Metal Injection	10/10
Rock Hard	7.5/10
Team Rock	3/5 stars

Conformicide is the fourth studio album by American thrash metal band Havok, released on March 10, 2017. It is Havok's first album for Century Media Records after having released their three previous albums and 2012 EP Point of No Return on Candlelight Records, their only release with bassist Nick Schendzielos and their first studio album since Unnatural Selection (2013), making it the longest gap between the band's albums.

== Track listing ==
All lyrics are written by David Sanchez; all music is composed by Havok

No.	Title	Length
1.	"F.P.C."	5:20
2.	"Hang 'Em High"	4:49
3.	"Dogmaniacal"	5:55
4.	"Intention to Deceive"	5:42
5.	"Ingsoc"	7:41
6.	"Masterplan"	6:25
7.	"Peace Is in Pieces"	5:17
8.	"Claiming Certainty"	3:42
9.	"Wake Up"	5:41
10.	"Circling the Drain"	7:17
Total length:		57:49

CD digipak bonus tracks
No.	Title	Writer(s)	Length
11.	"String Break"		0:43
12.	"Slaughtered" (Pantera cover)	Phil Anselmo, Dimebag Darrell, Rex Brown, Vinnie Paul	3:55
Total length:			62:27

Vinyl bonus tracks
No.	Title	Length
11.	"String Break"	0:43
12.	"Slaughtered" (Pantera cover)	3:55
13.	"Claiming Certainty" (live)	3:42
Total length:		66:09

== Personnel ==
Havok

- David Sanchez – lead vocals, rhythm guitar
- Reece Scruggs – lead guitar, backing vocals
- Nick Schendzielos – bass, backing vocals
- Pete Webber – drums

Guests

- John Hernandez – additional shouting
- Tim Ryan – Introductory news announcement in "Intention to Deceive"

== Charts ==
Chart (2017)	Peak position
Belgian Albums (Ultratop Flanders)	124
German Albums (Offizielle Top 100)	94
Greek Albums (IFPI)	68
Swiss Albums (Schweizer Hitparade)	96
