= The Hellenic Terror =

Studio album by Kronos
- Released: April 1, 2007
- Genre: Death metal
- Label: Xtreem Music

Kronos chronology
Colossal Titan Strife (2004)	The Hellenic Terror (2007)	Arisen New Era (2015)

The Hellenic Terror is the third album from French death metal band Kronos. It was released in 2007, through Xtreem Music.

== Track listing ==
All songs written by Kronos

1. "The Road of Salvation" (3:52)
2. "Bringers of Disorder" (4:01)
3. "...Until the End of Time" (4:06)
4. "Suffocate the Ignorant" (3:30)
5. "A Huge Cataclysm" (4:11)
6. "Tricephalic Hellkeeper" (3:27)
7. "Petrifying Beauty, part.1 Divine Vengeance" (3:16)
8. "Petrifying Beauty, part.2 The Murderous Reflection" (3:23)
9. "Ouranian Cyclops" (4:29)
10. "Maze of Oblivion" (4:17)

== Personnel ==
- Grams (guitar)
- Richard (guitar)
- Tom (bass and backup vocals)
- Mike (drums)
- Kristof (vocals)
