= Hudson Music =

American publishing and distribution company

- Status: Active
- Founded: 1998; 28 years ago New York City
- Founder: Robert Wallis and Paul Siegel
- Country of origin: United States
- Headquarters location: New York City
- Key people: Rob Wallis (Owner); Michael Hoff (Digital Media Director, Product Design, Web Development); Joe Bergamini (Senior Editor)
- Publication types: Sheet music, books, DVDs, software
- Official website: www.hudsonmusic.com

Hudson Music (formerly DCI Music Video from 1982 to 1997) is an American music publishing and distribution company founded in New York City by Robert Wallis and Paul Siegel.

== History ==
Before getting into the publishing industry, founder Rob Wallis was an owner of The Drummer's Collective in New York, purchasing it with partner Paul Siegel in 1980. They founded DCI Music Video in 1982 to produce drum-oriented educational VHS tapes as a way to diversify their educational offerings. One of the first DCI products was a video featuring Steve Gadd. Another early release was The History of R&B/Funk Drumming with Yogi Horton.

The business was a success and in 1992 they sold the catalog, though retained creative control, to CPP/Belwin which would later be acquired by Warner Brothers. With Warner Brothers they had access to distribution by Hal Leonard. They also started a related company for book publishing, Manhattan Music. In 1998, Wallis and Siegel started Hudson Music to shift from VHS to DVD format. The first Hudson DVD featured Steve Smith of Journey fame. Hudson also gained notoriety by releasing several DVDs with famed drummer Neil Peart of Rush, including his Anatomy of a Drum Solo in 2005.

In 2007, Hudson launched the Hudson Limited label for independently produced content and in 2009 launched Hudson Digital to offer downloadable content on their website, including over 200 titles. Hudson added print books and eBooks to their product offerings, and in 2009 brought on Joe Bergamini as Senior Editor. Continuing with their digital content theme, in 2013 Hudson launched a Hudson Digital Bookstore app. Hudson content has won Wallis and Siegel the Modern Drummer Editor's Achievement Award and the Percussive Arts Society President's Achievement Award. In 2020, Hudson partnered with Alfred Music to release many of their classic instructional titles in a downloadable digital format, along with many titles from Modern Drummer publications, Hal Leonard, and Rebeats.

== Artists and authors ==
- Chris Adler
- Carmine Appice
- Carter Beauford
- Ryan Alexander Bloom
- Dennis Chambers
- Phil Collins
- Seth Davis
- Virgil Donati
- Dom Famularo
- Steve Gadd
- David Garibaldi
- Mark Guiliana
- Lionel Hampton
- Claus Hessler
- George Kollias
- Thomas Lang
- Mike Mangini
- Jojo Mayer
- Russ Miller
- Ian Paice
- Neil Peart
- Mike Portnoy
- Rocco Prestia
- Tito Puente
- Johnny Rabb
- Derek Roddy
- Todd Sucherman
- Chad Smith
- Steve Smith
- Dave Weckl
- Victor Wooten
