= Burn (Havok album) =

Studio album by Havok
- Released: June 2, 2009
- Recorded: 2008
- Studios: Denver, Colorado
- Genre: Thrash metal
- Length: 49:18
- Label: Candlelight
- Producer: Havok

Havok chronology
Pwn 'Em All (2007)	Burn (2009)	Time Is Up (2011)

Professional ratings
Review scores
Source	Rating
AllMusic	3.5/5 stars

Burn is the first full-length album recorded by the thrash metal band, Havok. It was released in 2009 on Candlelight Records.

== Background ==
Drum, bass and guitar recording started in mid-2008 in the basement of singer/guitarist David Sanchez's mother's house, in Lakewood, Colorado. It took roughly six months. Vocals were recorded later at Motaland Studios in Denver with engineer Bart McCrorey, who also mixed the album. The band did not work with a producer due to a limited budget of roughly $2,500.

Halsey Swain provided the artwork after an earlier version of the same concept by another artist was rejected.

The album consists of five tracks that had been previously released on various EPs or demos and seven tracks that were original to the album. Bassist Justin Cantrell contributed "Morbid Symmetry" to the songwriting process, but left the band before recording began. This track was designated the "single" for the album, though no actual single was ever released. Jessie De Los Santos replaced him. Drummer Ryan Bloom left the band shortly before the album's release date and was not permanently replaced until 2010. His credit on the album reads, "drum tracks by Ryan Bloom", and he was the lyricist for "Ivory Tower".

The band's first official music video was made for "Morbid Symmetry" in 2009. The video was filmed at The Marquis Theater in Denver in front of a live crowd. The video features the same lineup as the album. Footage includes shots taken from the actual performance and from the sound check earlier in the day.

In October 2018, Burn, along with other early albums, was reissued in a limited edition vinyl format by Candlelight.

== Track listing ==
No.	Title	Music	Length
1.	"Wrecquiem"	Sanchez	1:37
2.	"The Root of Evil"	Chavez, Sanchez	5:35
3.	"Path to Nowhere"	Bloom, Chavez, Sanchez, de los Santos	3:41
4.	"Morbid Symmetry"	Bloom, Chavez, Sanchez, de los Santos, Cantrell	4:55
5.	"Identity Theft"	Chavez, Sanchez	4:42
6.	"The Disease"	Chavez, Sanchez	4:26
7.	"Scabs of Trust"	Bloom, Chavez, Sanchez, de los Santos	4:46
8.	"Ivory Tower"	Bloom, Chavez, Sanchez, de los Santos	3:48
9.	"To Hell"	Chavez, Sanchez	4:10
10.	"Category of the Dead"	Chavez, Sanchez	5:35
11.	"Melting the Mountain"	Bloom, Chavez, Sanchez, de los Santos	2:42
12.	"Afterburner"	Bloom, Chavez, Sanchez, de los Santos	3:25
Total length:			49:18

== Personnel ==
Havok

- David Sanchez– lead vocals, rhythm guitar
- Shawn Chavez – lead guitar, backing vocals
- Jesse de los Santos – bass, backing vocals
- Ryan Alexander Bloom – drums

Production

- Bart McCrorey - engineering, mixing
- Patrick Glenn - photography
- Halsey Swain - artwork
