= Arisen New Era =

Studio album by Kronos
- Released: July 24, 2015
- Genre: Death metal
- Label: Unique Leader Records

Kronos chronology
The Hellenic Terror (2007)	Arisen New Era (2015)

Arisen New Era is the fourth and final album from French death metal band Kronos. Released in Europe on July 24, 2015.

== Track listing ==
All songs written by Kronos

1. "Infernal Abyss Sovereignty" (4:08)
2. "Zeus Dethroned" (3:59)
3. "Soul-Voracious Vultures" (3:44)
4. "Rapture in Misery" (3:23)
5. "Klymenos Underwrath" (4:17)
6. "Aeons Titan Crown" (4:21)
7. "Brotherlords" (4:18)
8. "Purity Slaughtered" (4:18)
9. "Hellysium" (4:27)

== Credits ==
- Grams (guitar)
- Richard (guitar)
- Tom (bass)
- Anthony (drums)
- Trivette (vocals)
