= V (Havok album) =

Studio album by Havok
- Released: May 1, 2020
- Recorded: July–September, 2019
- Genre: Thrash metal
- Length: 45:45
- Label: Century Media
- Producer: Mark Lewis

Havok chronology
Conformicide (2017)	V (2020)	New Eyes (2024)

Professional ratings
Review scores
Source	Rating
LouderSound	4/5 stars
Distorted Sound	9/10
The Rockpit	9/10
Sonic Perspectives	9.0/10
Metal Gods TV	10/10

V is the fifth studio album by American thrash metal band Havok, released on May 1, 2020. This is the band's only release with bassist Brandon Bruce, who left Havok in August of the following year, and the last to feature lead guitarist Reece Scruggs before his departure from the band in July 2024. Music videos were produced for the tracks "Phantom Force" and "Post-Truth Era".

== Reception ==
The album has received both praises from critics and mixed to positive reviews from fans. With many critics calling it a modern metal masterpiece. LouderSound gave a high review and stated that the band has nailed 21st-century thrash with its new album V. "Denver thrashers Havok’s new album V is where old school thrash speed meets new school thrash attitude," they commented. "Although retro-minded, Havok sound sharp and as furiously relevant as ever even as we struggle onward through difficult times." A reviewer of Distorted Sound Magazine praised it as being a modern-day classic that showcases the band’s talent for keeping alive the thrash sound. In Treblezine's review of the album, they also gave it high praise; Namely a switch of targets lyrically away and removing the toxic venom toward efforts of social justice and moving more towards the broader structures that poison and destroy the world. They further added with high regard to the vocals having a uniform of nasally thrashy half-bark, but bearing a surprising elasticity. "Their riffs have the perfect blend of finger-twisting menace and neck-snapping power," they added further "The bass is bright and round here, with plenty of treble and mid-range, cutting through the guitars like butter, having a sound sitting between the iconic spring of a fretless and the earthy growl of a fretted."

== Track listing ==
All lyrics are written by David Sánchez; all music is composed by Havok.

No.	Title	Length
1.	"Post-Truth Era"	3:53
2.	"Fear Campaign"	3:57
3.	"Betrayed by Technology"	3:44
4.	"Ritual of the Mind"	4:10
5.	"Interface with the Infinite"	4:02
6.	"Dab Tsog"	1:15
7.	"Phantom Force"	2:59
8.	"Cosmetic Surgery"	4:24
9.	"Panpsychism"	6:29
10.	"Merchants of Death"	2:45
11.	"Don't Do It"	8:07
Total length:		45:45

== Personnel ==
Havok

- David Sanchez – lead vocals, rhythm guitar, rain stick on "Dab Tsog"
- Reece Scruggs – lead guitar
- Pete Webber – drums
- Brandon Bruce – bass, goat nails on "Dab Tsog"

Additional personnel

- Mark Lewis – engineering, mixing, mastering
- Eliran Kantor – artwork

== Charts ==
Chart performance for V
Chart (2020)	Peak position
German Albums (Offizielle Top 100)	48
Swiss Albums (Schweizer Hitparade)	73
