= The Dementia Process =

Studio album by Eradikal Insane
- Released: April 16, 2011
- Genre: Deathcore
- Length: 23:04
- Label: Independent

The Dementia Process is the debut EP by the French deathcore band Eradikal Insane. It was self-released on April 16, 2011 in digipack edition and limited to 1000 copies.

Track 1 feature vocals by François of Digital Nova

== Track listing ==
1. "Depths Of Conflict" – 5:37
2. "The Dementia Process" – 3:27
3. "God Bless You" – 3:51
4. "Deathcore United" – 4:46
5. "The Abyss From Below" – 5:23

== Band members ==
- Flo - lead guitar, backing vocals
- Nico - guitar
- R. - drums
- J.Trom - lead vocals
- Math - bass
