= Abaddon Incarnate =

Irish deathgrind band

- Also known as: Bereaved (1991–1994)
- Origin: Dublin, Ireland
- Genres: Deathgrind; blackened death metal (early)
- Years active: 1994–present
- Labels: Season of Mist; Sentinel; Xtreem; Underground Movement; Candlelight; Transcending Obscurity; Metalage
- Members: Bill Whelan; Olan Parkinson; Cory-Annatar-Sloan
- Website: abaddonincarnateofficial.com

Abaddon Incarnate are an Irish deathgrind band, formed in Dublin in 1994 as Bereaved. They have released six albums, the latest of which, The Wretched Sermon, was released in 2022. Originally a blackened death metal band, they shifted to deathgrind on subsequent releases.

== History ==
Abaddon Incarnate was formed in Dublin in 1994, playing blackened death metal. The band released two demo cassette tapes as Bereaved, Signs of Death in 1992 and Tortured Souls in 1994. They changed their name to Abaddon Incarnate on their third demo, When the Demons Come. Since then, the band has released two more promos (in 1996 and 2001) and six full-length albums: The Last Supper in 1999, Nadir in 2001, Dark Crusade in 2003, Cascade in 2009, Pessimist in 2014, and The Wretched Sermon 2022. They released a split 7-inch with U.S. grindcore band Phobia in 2011.

The band has toured in Europe, including Spain, France, Britain, Switzerland, and Germany. They were the first extreme Irish metal band to play in Ecuador, Colombia and Peru. They have also toured in Russia and Australia.

Abaddon Incarnate are signed to Transcending Obscurity Records (UK). They were previously signed to Slovakian label Metalage Productions, French label Season of Mist, Irish label Sentinel Records, and Spanish label Xtreem Music.

Original drummer Olan Parkinson rejoined in 2019 after filling in for some Irish dates. The band released their sixth album, The Wretched Sermon, in early 2022. In June 2022, the band revealed that the album would be released on 5 August. The single "This Verminous Creation" was released in October 2025.

== Members ==
=== Current ===
- Bill Whelan – guitar, vocals (1994–present)
- Olan Parkinson – drums (1994–2002, 2020–present)
- Cory Sloan – bass, vocals (1999–2002, 2003–2004, 2024–present)

=== Former ===
- Rob Tierney – bass (1994–1999)
- Jason Connolly – drums (2003–2007)
- Steve Finnerty – bass (2007–2015)
- Johnny King – drums (2007–2016)
- Karl Leavey – drums (2016–2019)
- Wayne Glass – vocals (2016–2020)
- Stephen "Steve" Maher – guitar, vocals (1994–2024)
- Irene Siragusa – bass, vocals (2015–2024)

== Discography ==
=== As Bereaved ===
- Signs of Death (demo, 1992) with Alan Kelly, Shane Foley
- Tortured Souls (demo, 1994) with Alan Kelly, Shane Foley

=== As Abaddon Incarnate ===
==== Studio albums ====
- The Last Supper (Season of Mist, 1999)
- Nadir (Sentinel, 2001)
- Dark Crusade (Xtreem Music, 2004)
- Cascade (Metal Age, 2009)
- Pessimist (Candlelight Records, 2014)
- The Wretched Sermon (Transcending Obscurity, 2022)

==== Demos/split ====
- When the Demons Come (demo, 1995)
- 2-track Sampler (demo, 1996)
- 3 Track Sampler 2001 (demo, 2001)
- Phobia/Abaddon Incarnate split 7-inch (Underground Movement, 2011)
