= Riders of the Plague =

Studio album by The Absence
- Released: August 7, 2007
- Recorded: February–March 2007
- Studios: Mana Studios, Florida
- Genres: Melodic death metal, thrash metal
- Length: 55:15
- Label: Metal Blade

The Absence chronology
From Your Grave (2005)	Riders of the Plague (2007)	Enemy Unbound (2010)

Professional ratings
Review scores
Source	Rating
Allmusic	3.5/5 stars
Blabbermouth	8.5/10
Rock Hard	5/10
Metal.de	8/10
Metalitalia.com	6/10
Chronicles of Chaos	7.5/10
Exact	4/6

Riders of the Plague is the second full-length album by American heavy metal band the Absence. It was released on August 10, 2007 on Metal Blade Records.

== Track listing ==
1. "Riders of the Plague" – 3:59
2. "Dead and Gone" – 5:00
3. "The Murder" – 5:20
4. "Echos" – 5:03
5. "World Divides" – 5:33
6. "Prosperity" – 4:07 (Instrumental)
7. "Untitled" – 0:04 (Silence)
8. "Awakening" – 5:12
9. "Merciless" – 6:42
10. "Into the Pit" – 2:46 (Testament cover)
11. "The Victorious Dead" – 4:14
12. "Outro" – 7:03 (Instrumental)
- "Outro" fades and ends at 2:47. Silence continues until 6:14 at which point a phone ringing can be heard and the lead singer is heard leaving a voicemail on a cell phone, repeating "I'll find you!"

== Personnel ==
=== Band members ===
- Jamie Stewart – vocals
- Patrick Pintavalle – guitars, bass guitar
- Jeramie Kling – drums, backing vocals
- Peter Joseph – guitars, bass guitar

=== Guest musicians ===
- Per Nilsson (Scar Symmetry) – lead guitar on track 3
- Jonas Kjellgren (Scar Symmetry) – producer, lead guitar on tracks 11 and 12, extra vocals on track 9
- Santiago Dobles (Aghora) – banjo, lead guitar on track 3
- James Murphy (Death) – lead guitar on tracks 8 and 12
- Jonas Granvik (Edge of Sanity) – extra vocals on track 9

=== Production ===
- Mixed and mastered at Black Lounge Studios, Sweden by Jonas Kjellgren
- Brian Elliot – assistant engineer

=== Artwork ===
- Cover art by Tim Collier
- Layout by Peter Joseph and Brian Ames
- Photography by Scott Merselis
