= Kronos (band) =

French death metal band

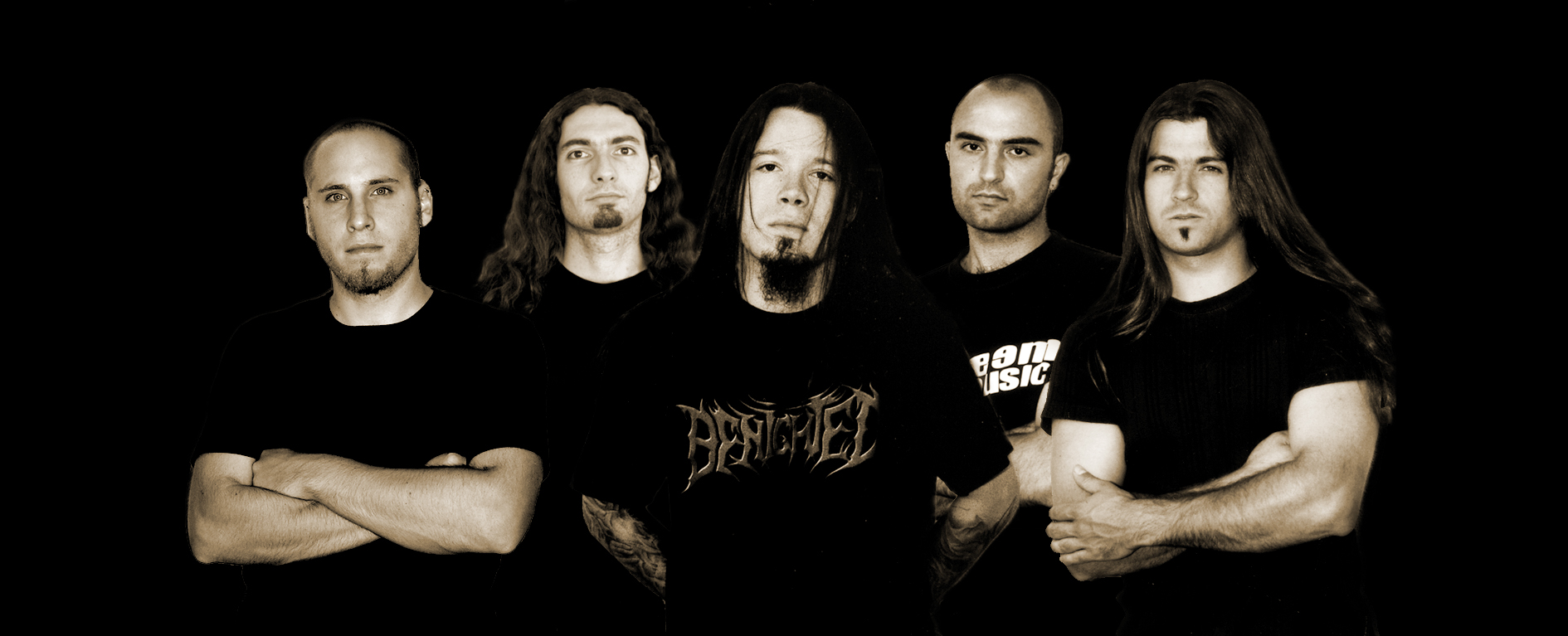
- Kronos in 2007

Background information
- Origin: France
- Genre: Death metal
- Years active: 1994–2017
- Labels: Unique Leader, Xtreem
- Members: Chris; Grams; Tom; Richard; Mike
- Past members: Nicolas Temmar; Marrot; Jeremy; Kristof
- Website: kronosbrutaldeath.free.fr

Kronos was a French death metal band. Their name references the titan Cronus, father of Zeus in Greek mythology.

== Lyrical subjects ==
Their lyrics revolve mainly around myths, legends, and history of the ancient civilizations of Rome, Greece and Egypt, and also Scandinavia and old barbarian kingdoms.

== History ==
Kronos was formed in 1994 in Thaon-les-Vosges, France, by Grams, Marot, Jeremy, and Mike. The band played heavy/thrash metal. Two years later, guitarist Tems replaced Marot and singer Kristof joined the band. Kronos started playing death metal, and recorded the demo Outrance. In 1999, Tom replaced Jéremy, and the band moved towards brutal death metal. The following year, they recorded the four-song demo Split Promo 2000.

Their first, self-produced album, Titan's Awakening, was released in 2001. The band was acclaimed by critics and signed with Warpath Records (formerly Shockwave). A new edition of Titan's Awakening was released at the end of October the same year, with a new cover designed by Deather (Angel Corpse, Gurkkhas, Vital Remains) and a new booklet. Richard replaced Tems in 2003. The band signed a two-album contract with Spanish label Xtreem music, managed by Dave Rotten from the band Avulsed. The second album was released in 2004, Colossal Titan Strife. The band toured Europe in 2005 promoting the album. The third album was released in April 2007, The Hellenic Terror.

== Members ==
=== Current members ===
- Jérôme "Grams" Grammaire – guitar (1994–2017) vocals (1994–1996)
- Tom "Tom2" Viel – bass, vocals (1999–2017)
- Richard "Ricardo" Chuat – guitar (2003–2017)
- Trivette – vocals (2013–2017)
- Anthony Reyboz – drums (2014–2017)

=== Previous members ===
- Marot – guitar (1994–1996)
- Jeremy Siaux – bass (1994–1999)
- Michaël "Mike Sako" Saccoman – drums (1994–2012)
- Nicolas "Tems" Temmar – guitar (1996–2003)
- Christophe "Kristof" Gérardin – vocals (1996–2009)
- Quentin Regnault – drums (2012–2013)

== Logo ==
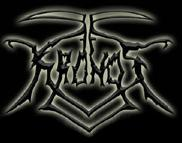
Kronos's logo (appears on multiple albums such as Titans Awakening, The Hellenic Terror and more).

Kronos's logo has remained the same throughout their career. It appears on every studio album of theirs. It consists of a jagged text saying "Kronos" while to scyths stand on the "O" and "N"

== Discography ==
=== Studio releases ===
- Titan's Awakening (2001)
- Colossal Titan Strife (2004)
- The Hellenic Terror (2007)
- Arisen New Era (2015)

=== Compilations ===
- Prelude To Awakening (2009)

=== Demos ===
- Outrance (tape) (1994)
- Split Promo 2000 with None Divine (2000)
