= Havok (band) =

American thrash metal band

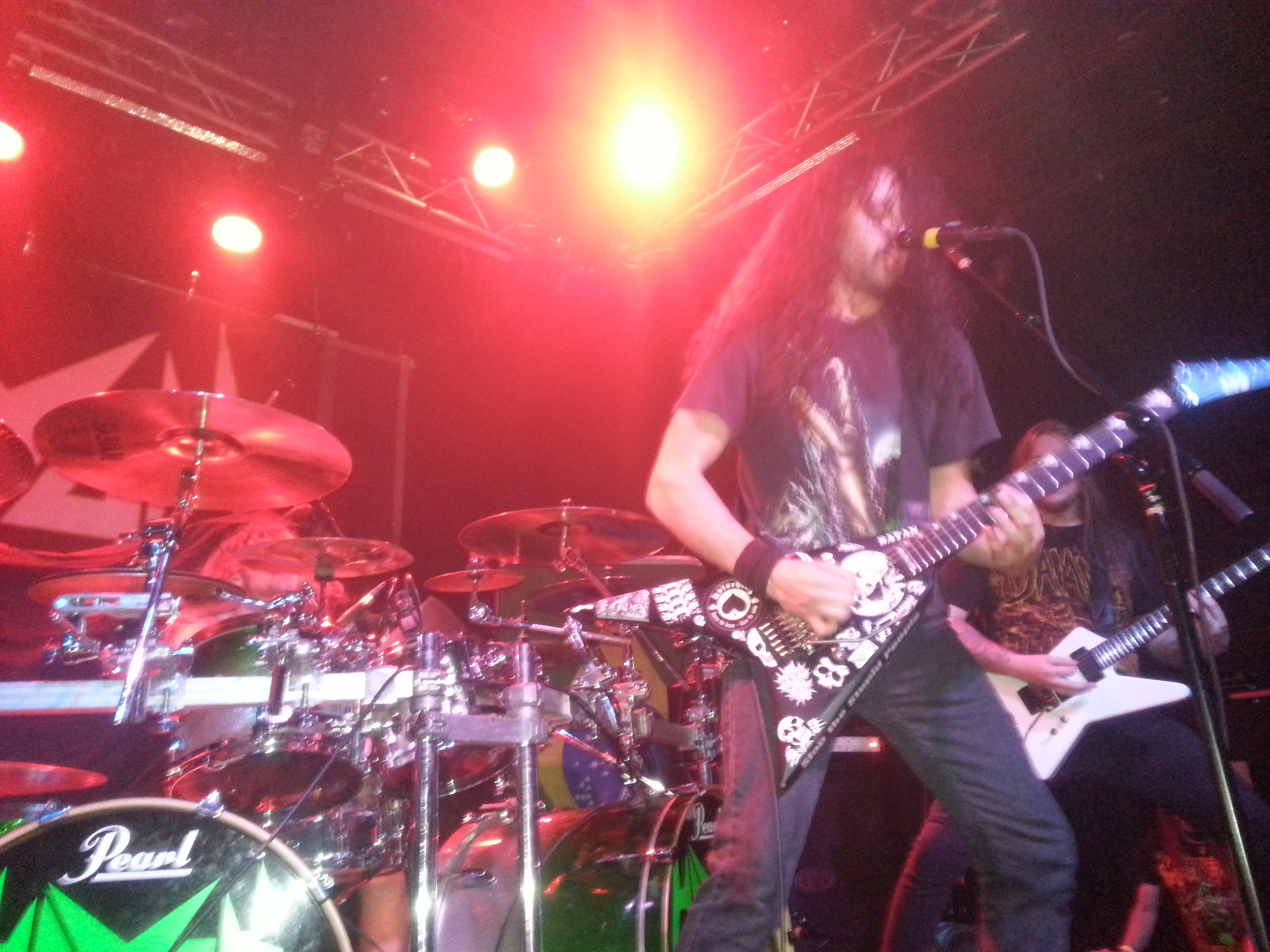
- Havok performing in 2013

Background information
- Origin: Denver, Colorado, U.S.
- Genre: Thrash metal
- Years active: 2004–present
- Labels: Candlelight, Century Media
- Members: David Sanchez; Pete Webber; Nick Schendzielos; Brett Rechtfertig
- Past members: Reece Scruggs; Shawn Chavez; Marcus Corich; Tyler Cantrell; Justin Cantrell; Jesse De Los Santos; Mike Leon; Haakon Sjoegren; Richie Tice; Ryan Alexander Bloom; Scott Fuller; Brandon Bruce
- Website: havokband.com

Havok is an American thrash metal band formed Denver, Colorado, in 2004. As of 2024, their lineup consists of frontman David Sanchez, drummer Pete Webber, and bassist Nick Schendzielos. They have gone through several personnel changes. Each album has featured a different lineup. Sanchez is the only remaining original member.

Havok has released five studio albums as of 2026: Burn (2009), Time Is Up (2011), Unnatural Selection (2013), Conformicide (2017) and V (2020). Along with Bonded by Blood, Evile, Hatchet, Municipal Waste and Warbringer, the band has been credited for leading the so-called "thrash metal revival" of the late 2000s and early 2010s. Their music has been influenced by 1980s thrash metal and the New wave of British heavy metal, death metal, hardcore punk and progressive rock/metal.

== History ==
David Sanchez formed Havok with drummer Haakon Sjoegren. The duo put up fliers around Denver looking for a guitar player. Guitarist Shawn Chavez joined the band. Bassist Marcus Corich rounded up the lineup. In 2004, Havok recorded the demo Thrash Can. In 2005, they self-released the EP Murder by Metal. By 2007, bassist Tyler Cantrell and drummer Rich Tice joined the band. On September 19, this line-up self-released the EP Pwn 'Em All. Cantrell's brother Justin replaced him on several tours in support of the EP.

In December 2007, Havok, having just hired drummer Ryan Bloom that fall, sent a copy of their EP and a press kit to any metal label they could find. The EP caught the ear of English extreme metal label, Candlelight Records, and soon after the band agreed to join them. Havok hired new bassist, Jesse De Los Santos, in the fall of 2008. On June 2, 2009, Havok released their full-length debut, Burn. However, Ryan Bloom left the band in April before the release of "Burn". To replace him, they briefly went on the road with Scott Fuller, but they eventually hired Pete Webber as the full-time drummer. Burn was received quite well in the metal community, but it did not yet break them into the global metal scene. The band was set to begin touring with Primal Fear on May 20, 2010, at New York's Gramercy Theater, but guitarist Shawn Chavez quit the band the same day. Instead of jumping ship, Sanchez took up learning all the solos, and Havok toured as a trio. In September 2010, Winchester, VA shredder Reece Scruggs joined the band as their new lead guitarist. Havok then returned to the studio to record their sophomore effort. On March 29, 2011, Havok released Time Is Up. This spread through the metal community, receiving strong reviews from critics and fans alike. It became a defining album in what has come to be known as the New Wave of Thrash Metal scene. The success of Time Is Up has led the band to major tours opening for bands like thrash metal veterans Forbidden, alongside Revocation and White Wizzard; as well as tours opening for Sepultura, Death Angel, Anthrax, The English Dogs, the Casualties, Goatwhore, 3 Inches of Blood, Skeletonwitch, and Exhumed. 2012 was wrapped up for the band by playing the first Barge to Hell cruise featuring bands At the Gates, Behemoth, Mayhem, Possessed, Exodus, and Sacred Reich to name a few.

After over a year of heavy touring, Havok returned home to Denver with plans to record their next album. Havok was invited to open for Testament's 'Dark Roots of Thrash' tour at their Denver show after Overkill was forced to drop from the tour due to singer Bobby "Blitz" Ellsworth falling ill. Fans were introduced to Havok's new bassist, Mike Leon (previously of Tampa, Florida metallers the Absence), after Jesse left the band to spend time with family. Havok began recording their newest album in the spring of 2013. Unnatural Selection was released on June 25, 2013, and in its first week charted on the Billboard top 200 at No. 154 selling over 2,500 copies. Shortly after the release, the band went to Bogota, Colombia to play the Rock Al Parque festival, playing to an estimated 45,000 people. The festival also included Cannibal Corpse and Symphony X. The band set out on a 50 plus day headline tour to support "Unnatural Selection" with dates that lead up to the Montreal, Canada festival Heavy MTL on August 11. Unnatural Selection was the band's last release on Candlelight Records and on July 11, the band signed with Century Media Records.

On April 30, 2015, founding lead guitarist Shawn Chavez died at age 30.

On September 22, 2015, the band announced that they had parted ways with bassist Mike Leon (who had joined Soulfly), and had replaced him with Nick Schendzielos from Cephalic Carnage and Job for a Cowboy. That same month, it was announced that Havok had been working on their fourth studio album, Conformicide, which was released on March 10, 2017.

On May 17, 2018, the band announced the dates for the North American tour beginning on July 13 and ending on August 5. Jungle Rot and Extinction A.D. were also seen along.

In a July 2018 interview with Sonic Perspectives, Sanchez stated that Havok was going to "stop touring soon" and begin writing a new album, which he had hoped would be released by the summer of 2019. The album, titled V, was released on May 1, 2020, and is their only release with new bassist Brandon Bruce. On August 2, 2021, Bruce announced via Instagram account that he had left Havok, explaining: "As of a couple weeks ago I have officially left Havok. This is something I thought a lot about and is what I believe is the best decision for myself and the band. I wish them all the best both professionally and personally in the future. I would like to thank everyone that enjoyed what I was able to do with them musically."

On August 3, 2021, Metal Storm reported that Havok had "reportedly" been working on new material. The band embarked on its first U.S. tour in four years during the summer of 2023, and by this time, bassist Nick Schendzielos had rejoined. Miami New Times reported in July 2023 that new music from Havok would be released in 2024.

On July 30, 2024, Reece Scruggs announced that he had left Havok after fourteen years as the band's lead guitarist, citing scheduling conflicts. Brett Rechtfertig of Psychosomatic will be filling in for Scruggs on the band's summer and fall 2024 tour dates.

The band performed at Milwaukee Metal Fest in June 2026. They also be toured the U.S. during the summer alongside Killswitch Engage, Machine Head and Iron Reagan.

== Band members ==
Current members

- David Sanchez – lead vocals, rhythm guitar (2004–present)
- Pete Webber – drums (2010–present)
- Nick Schendzielos – bass, backing vocals (2015–2019, 2023–present)

Former members

- Marcus Corich – bass (2004–2005)
- Tyler Cantrell – bass (2006–2007)
- Haakon Sjoegren – drums (2004–2005)
- Shawn Chavez – lead guitar (2004–2010; died 2015)
- Richie Tice – drums (2005–2007)
- Justin Cantrell – bass, backing vocals (2007–2008)
- Ryan Alexander Bloom – drums (2007–2009)
- Scott Fuller – drums (2009–2010)
- Jesse de los Santos – bass, backing vocals (2009–2012)
- Reece Scruggs – lead guitar, backing vocals (2010–2024)
- Mike Leon – bass, backing vocals (2013–2015)
- Brandon Bruce – bass (2019–2021)

Live musicians

- Steven Sanchez – drums (2007)
- Dan Gargiulo – lead guitar (2014)
- Todd Stern – lead guitar (2014)
- Marshall Wieczorek – drums (2014)
- Brett Rechtfertig – lead guitar (2024–present)

Timeline

== Discography ==
=== Albums ===
Year	Album details
2009	Burn: Released: June 2, 2009; Label: Candlelight; Format: CD, LP, digital download
2011	Time Is Up: Released: March 29, 2011; Label: Candlelight; Format: CD, LP, digital download
2013	Unnatural Selection: Released: June 25, 2013; Label: Candlelight; Format: CD, LP, digital download
2017	Conformicide: Released: March 10, 2017; Label: Century Media; Format: CD, LP, digital download
2020	V: Released: May 1, 2020; Label: Century Media; Format: CD, LP, digital download

=== Demos ===
Year	Demo details
2004	Thrash Can: Released: 2004; Label: Self-released; Format: CD
2006	Murder by Metal: Released: May 4, 2006; Label: Self-released; Format: CD

=== EPs ===
Year	Album details
2007	Pwn 'Em All: Released: September 19, 2007; Label: Self-released; Format: CD
2012	Point of No Return: Released: May 22, 2012; Label: Candlelight; Format: CD, digital download
2024	New Eyes: Released: November 1, 2024; Label: Afterburner; Format: Digital download

=== Singles ===
Year	Title	Album
2010	"Fatal Intervention"	Time Is Up
2011	"Scumbag in Disguise"	Time Is Up
2013	"Give Me Liberty...Or Give Me Death"	Unnatural Selection
2016	"Claiming Certainty" (live)	non-album single
2016	"Hang 'Em High"	Conformicide
2017	"Ingsoc"	Conformicide
2017	"Intention to Deceive"	Conformicide
2020	"Phantom Force"	V
2020	"Post Truth Era"	V
2020	"Fear Campaign"	V
2024	"Death Is an Illusion"	New Eyes
2026	"Fifth Generation Warfare"	non-album single

=== Music videos ===
- "Morbid Symmetry" (2009)
- "Covering Fire" (2011)
- "D.O.A." (2011)
- "Point of No Return" (2013)
- "From the Cradle to the Grave" (2013)
- "Give Me Liberty... or Give Me Death" (2013)
- "Worse Than War" (2013)
- "Chasing the Edge" (2014)
- "Intention to Deceive" (2017)
- "Phantom Force" (2020)
- "Fear Campaign" (2020)
- "Death Is an Illusion" (2024)
- "The Ultimate Weapon" (2026)
