= Crested Butte Community School =

Coordinates: 38.8653°N 106.9759°W

Location
- 818 Red Lady Ave; Crested Butte, Colorado 81224; United States

Information
- Type: Public
- Established: 1997 (29 years ago)
- School district: Gunnison Watershed School District RE-1J
- CEEB code: 060329
- Teaching staff: 44
- Grades: K-12
- Enrollment: 721 (2019-20)
- Student to teacher ratio: 15
- Colors: Blue and silver
- Athletics conference: 2A/3A - Mountain League
- Nickname: Titans
- Website: cbcs.gunnisonschools.net

Crested Butte Community School (CBCS) is a K-12 school in Crested Butte, Colorado serving Crested Butte, Mt. Crested Butte, and many areas of unincorporated Gunnison County.

== History ==
CBCS was originally built in 1997 and was designed by the same architects as the school in Telluride, Colorado. Plans were made to expand and remodel the building in 2008. Construction for the new portion of the building began in 2009, and would significantly increase the number of classrooms, expand the size of the auditorium space, and improve the athletic facilities. In 2018, enrollment reached an unprecedented level, over 760 students, with more growth projected. Modular classrooms were needed in addition to the renovated building to accommodate the student population.

== Rankings ==
U.S. News ranked the CBCS high school #10 in Colorado and #260 in the country for 2017.

== Demographics ==
- Male - 55%
- Female - 45%
- Hispanic - 4%
- White - 91%
- 2 Races - 3%
- Other - 2%

== Notable alumni or staff ==
Alumni

- Holly Montag (2002)
- Ryan Alexander Bloom (2003)
- Heidi Montag (2005)
- Emma Coburn (2008)
- Aaron Blunck (2014)

Attended

- Jon Paul Steuer (attended, transferred before graduation)
- David Chodounsky(attended middle school ‘97-‘99, transferred before high school)

Staff

- Stevie Kremer
