= From Your Grave =

Studio album by The Absence
- Released: September 6, 2005
- Recorded: April 2005
- Studio: Mana Studios
- Genres: Melodic death metal, thrash metal
- Length: 42:22
- Label: Metal Blade
- Producers: Erik Rutan, The Absence

The Absence chronology
The Absence (2004)	From Your Grave (2005)	Riders of the Plague (2007)

Professional ratings
Review scores
Source	Rating
Allmusic	4/5 stars
Blabbermouth	8/10
Chronicles of Chaos	6/10
Metal Injection	7/10
Metal.de	7.5/10
Metalitalia.com	6/10
Rock Hard	6.5/10
Scream Magazine	4/6

From Your Grave is the debut album by American melodic death metal band, The Absence. It was released on September 19, 2005 through Metal Blade Records.

== Reviews ==
The album was said to be a notable album in melodic death metal. It is also said to blend "all that is notable about acts like early At the Gates, In Flames with the Finnish thrash technicality of Children of Bodom, plus some very melodic Maiden-ish twin lead work".

== Track listing ==
No.	Title	Length
1.	"Intro"	1:39
2.	"A Breath Beneath"	4:40
3.	"Necropolis"	4:21
4.	"From Your Grave"	4:15
5.	"Heaven Ablaze"	4:44
6.	"Summoning the Darkness"	5:24
7.	"Shattered"	1:12
8.	"I, Deceiver"	4:35
9.	"My Ruin"	5:17
10.	"Seven Demons"	6:10
11.	"The Dance" ((Bonus Track))	4:41
Total length:		42:22
