= Time Is Up =

Studio album by Havok
- Released: March 29, 2011
- Recorded: 2010
- Genre: Thrash metal
- Length: 42:02
- Label: Candlelight
- Producer: James Murphy

Havok chronology
Burn (2009)	Time Is Up (2011)	Point of No Return (2012)

Time Is Up is the second full-length album recorded by the thrash metal band Havok. It was released through Candlelight Records in 2011.

== Background ==
In the pre-conception of the album, the band was going through many lineup changes, and as a result most of the material and demos for the album were written without a lead guitarist or drummer. Most of the songs on the album were written by frontman David Sanchez and bassist Jesse De Los Santos. By the time recording of Time Is Up had started, Reece Scruggs and Pete Webber had joined the band. There were 2 music videos made for the album, "D.O.A" and "Covering Fire".

== Reception ==
Professional ratings
Review scores
Source	Rating
AllMusic	4/5 stars
Blabbermouth.net	8.5/10
Rock Hard	9.0/10

Time Is Up garnered generally favorable reviews in the metal community. Critics have cited the album as being "somewhat generic" in some parts. MetalUnderground.com compared the album to many classic thrash albums such as Metallica's ...And Justice for All, and Slayer's Reign in Blood.

== Track listing ==
No.	Title	Writer(s)	Length
1.	"Prepare for Attack"	Sanchez	3:56
2.	"Fatal Intervention"	Sanchez, de los Santos	4:27
3.	"No Amnesty"	Sanchez, Webber	3:29
4.	"D.O.A."	Sanchez	3:43
5.	"Covering Fire"	Sanchez, de los Santos	4:15
6.	"Killing Tendencies"	Sanchez	5:32
7.	"Scumbag in Disguise"	Sanchez	4:33
8.	"The Cleric"	Sanchez, Webber	4:45
9.	"Out of My Way"	Sanchez	3:20
10.	"Time Is Up"	Sanchez, de los Santos, Webber	4:02
Total length:			42:02

Bonus tracks
No.	Title	Writer(s)	Length
11.	"Postmortem/Raining Blood" (Slayer cover) (iTunes edition bonus track)	Jeff Hanneman, Kerry King	7:16

== Personnel ==
Havok

- David Sanchez – lead vocals, rhythm guitar
- Reece Scruggs – lead guitar, backing vocals
- Jesse de los Santos – bass, backing vocals
- Pete Webber – drums

Artwork and design

- Halsey Swain – cover artwork
