= Demigod (band) =

Finnish death metal band

- Origin: Loimaa, Finland
- Genres: Death metal
- Years active: 1990–2008, 2010–2013
- Labels: Drowned Productions; Repulse Records; Spikefarm Records; Xtreem Music
- Members: Tuomas Ala-Nissilä; Jussi Kiiski; Tuomas Karppinen; Sami Vesanto; Tuomo Latvala
- Past members: Esa Lindén; Seppo Taatila; Erik Parviainen; Tero Laitinen; Ali Leiniö; Mika Haapasalo
- Website: http://www.demigod.tv/

Demigod was a Finnish death metal band formed in 1990 in Loimaa, Finland. The band's debut album, Slumber of Sullen Eyes, is well regarded in the heavy metal community. Terrorizer included it in their list of "40 death metal albums that you must hear", commenting: "It is with this often overlooked classic that one of the greatest love stories of all time unfolded: Florida's pummeling groove meets Sweden's buzzsaw guitar work in a union so deliciously evil it could move the hardest of bangers to tears of joy."

== History ==
Demigod was a popular group in the death metal underground of the 1990s. Despite a steady status and a decent number of shows, the band split up in the mid-90s. Demigod reformed in 1998 and signed to Spikefarm, a sublabel of major Finnish metal record company Spinefarm, who released the band's second album, Shadow Mechanics.

Between 2002 and 2006, this deal came to an end, and the band recorded the follow-up to Shadow Mechanics without a label. Recordings was finished in the summer of 2006, and the album was released on the band's own label, Open Game Productions, in 2007. Since late 2007, Spanish label Xtreem Music has handled worldwide distribution, leaving the Scandinavian market for the band's own label. Xtreem Music has re-released the debut album, previously out of print.

In 2012, Esa Linden and several other "Slumber of Sullen Eyes" members took part in several reunion shows. After the string of shows was over, the band intended to begin writing another album.

== Members ==
=== Current ===
- Esa Lindén - vocals (1990-1994, 1997-2001, 2010-present), guitar (1990-1993)
- Jussi Kiiski - guitars (1991-2008, 2010-present)
- Tuomas Karppinen - guitars (2007-2008, 2010-present)
- Sami Vesanto - bass (1993-2008, 2010-present)
- Tuomo Latvala - drums (2002-2008, 2010-present)

=== Former ===
- Seppo Taatila - drums (1990-2002)
- Tero Laitinen - bass (1990-1993), guitar (1994-2007)
- Mika Haapasalo - guitar (1992), vocals (1994-1997)
- Tuomas Ala-Nissilä - vocals (2001-2008)
- Ali Leiniö - vocals (2001)

== Discography ==
- Unholy Domain (Demo, 1991)
- Slumber of Sullen Eyes (1992)
- Shadow Mechanics (Spikefarm, 2002)
- Let Chaos Prevail (Open Game/Xtreem, 2007)
