= Unnatural Selection (Havok album) =

Studio album by Havok
- Released: June 25, 2013
- Genre: Thrash metal
- Length: 48:01
- Label: Candlelight

Havok chronology
Point of No Return (2012)	Unnatural Selection (2013)	Conformicide (2017)

Professional ratings
Review scores
Source	Rating
AllMusic	3.5/5 stars
Metal Forces	7.5/10 stars
Chronicles of Chaos	7/10 stars
Metal Injection	8/10
Rock Hard	8.0/10

Unnatural Selection is the third full-length album by American thrash metal band Havok. It was released on June 25, 2013 by Candlelight Records.

== Track listing ==
All lyrics written by David Sanchez, except where noted.

No.	Title	Lyrics	Music	Length
1.	"I Am the State"		David Sanchez, Reece Scruggs	4:05
2.	"Give Me Liberty... or Give Me Death"	Sanchez, Scruggs	Sanchez	4:43
3.	"It Is True"		Sanchez	4:49
4.	"Under the Gun"		Sanchez	4:18
5.	"Waste of Life"		Sanchez, Scruggs	6:12
6.	"Living Nightmare"		Sanchez	4:59
7.	"Chasing the Edge"		Sanchez	5:03
8.	"Worse than War"	Sanchez, Scruggs	Sanchez, Webber, Scruggs	4:57
9.	"Children of the Grave" (Black Sabbath cover)	Ozzy Osbourne, Tony Iommi, Geezer Butler, Bill Ward	Osbourne, Iommi, Butler, Ward	4:39
10.	"Unnatural Selection"	Sanchez, Scruggs	Sanchez, Scruggs	4:16
Total length:				48:01

== Personnel ==
Havok

- David Sanchez – lead vocals, rhythm guitar
- Reece Scruggs – lead guitar, backing vocals
- Mike Leon – bass
- Pete Webber – drums

Additional personnel

- Terry Date - mixing

== Charts ==
Chart	Peak position
U.S. Billboard 200	186
U.S. Top Hard Rock Albums	18
U.S. Top Heatseekers	3
U.S. Top Independent Albums	44
