= Ryan Alexander Bloom =

American drummer

- Born: Maryland, U.S.
- Genres: Thrash metal, death metal, heavy metal, hard rock
- Occupations: Musician, music teacher, author
- Instruments: Drums, percussion
- Years active: 2005–present
- Labels: Redefining Darkness, Candlelight, Hudson Music, Raw Skull, Mel Bay, Ruffe Dragg Press
- Member of: Bloodstrike
- Formerly of: Havok, Immortal Sÿnn, Amish Warfare, Amara Grace, Errant, Mordheim
- Website: bloomdrums.com

Ryan Alexander Bloom is an American drummer, author, and teacher. He is known for being a former member of the Colorado-based thrash metal band Havok, member of death metal band Bloodstrike, and the author of several books including Double Bass Drumming Explained, Thrash Metal Drumming Encyclopedia Rudimentia, and Rudimental Grand Tour

== Early life ==
Ryan grew up in a military family, his father Eric serving as a Lieutenant Colonel in the United States Marine Corps. He attended Crested Butte Community School in Crested Butte, Colorado for high school and participated in soccer and Track and field. In 2002, Ryan was named All-State Honorable Mention in soccer and finished 6th at the state championship track meet in the pole vault. Ryan graduated from the University of Colorado at Boulder with a degree in music.

== Music career ==
Ryan joined the band Havok in 2007, replacing later Speedwolf and Axeslasher drummer Richie Tice, and shortly afterward the band got an offer from famed metal label Candlelight Records with whom they ultimately signed a record deal. Ryan contributed drum tracks and lyrics to Havok's 2009 debut album Burn, and appeared in the music video for the song "Morbid Symmetry". Ryan toured with Havok for about 2 years, including the License to Thrash tour, but left Havok just before the official release of Burn.

In 2010 Ryan briefly joined up with Five Iron Frenzy guitarist Micah Ortega to form a death metal band called Mordheim which recorded a short demo called Brutal Demonstrations before disbanding. In 2011 Ryan was hired to record percussion on Amara Grace's album Can't Keep A Sunrise Down. In 2012 he was contacted by Rob Hubbard of Synthetic Minister to record drums for a side project grunge/punk band called Amish Warfare. The resulting EP was titled Immaculate Misconception.

In 2013, Ryan began working with Mackenzie Gault, of the platinum selling Denver band Flobots, teaching drums at her music school, Denver Music Tree. In June 2014, Ryan's website announced that he had joined the swedish death metal band Bloodstrike and had recorded a demo called Necrobirth. Bloodstrike features experienced band members including former members of Mausoleum Records artist Silencer and Root of All Evil Records artist Somnus. Also in 2014, Ryan began teaching at the Aurora, CO branch of the School of Rock, a chain of rock-oriented music schools. In the late summer of 2015, Ryan's band Bloodstrike announced that they had signed with Redefining Darkness Records and would be releasing the full-length album, In Death We Rot on September 25.

In 2017, Ryan recorded a second album with Bloodstrike called Execution of Violence with a release date of October 13. Bloodstrike subsequently toured with Brazil's Forceps on their Mastering Extinction US tour. Also in 2017, Ryan began filling in for Denver heavy metal and hard rock outfit Immortal Sÿnn as a live session drummer while regular drummer Axel Berrios was indisposed. This post would last into the summer of 2018 and included the US leg of Immortal Sÿnn's first tour.

Since 2019, Bloom has been on the Topper Marching Band staff at Los Alamos High School in New Mexico. The band won back to back state championships in 2025 and 2026.

In 2025, Ryan released an EP with Bloodstrike called Weapons of Steel and he became an endorser of Vater Percussion sticks and mallets as an educator.

== Publishing career ==
As an instructional author, Ryan has published original books on bass drum technique, drum and bass breakbeats, drum rudiments, thrash metal drumming, and subdivision and music reading. He has also transcribed two 19th-century manuals into modern notation, translated Swiss, French, and Spanish military manuals into English, and reissued editions of multiple public domain drum books.

The first book was Double Bass Drumming Explained: A Comprehensive Reference on the Art and Science of Double Bass, in 2012, which discusses double bass drum technique, style, and theory. The book draws on Ryan's own critically acclaimed drumming techniques and his teaching experience. Ryan published his second book, Double Bass Drumming Explained Part 2: The Workbook in 2013. Where the first book was mostly text, this sequel is a traditional instructional method consisting of mainly beats and notated exercises for practice.

In 2016, Ryan published a combined and revised edition of his books called The Complete Double Bass Drumming Explained. This edition fixed minor errors and added new topics, notably a section on cam shape, while condensing the previous two books into a single volume. In April 2017, The Complete Double Bass Drumming Explained was picked up by publisher Hudson Music and re-released in an exclusive digital ebook format.

In March 2018, Ryan secured a second deal with Hudson Music for the publication of his book, Live Drum & Bass - Breakbeats and Electronic Music for Real Drummers. This was Ryan's first offering outside of double bass instruction.

In 2019, Bloom published two books. The initial publication was his third book with publisher Hudson Music called Encyclopedia Rudimentia - The Ultimate Drum Rudiment Collection. Encompassing over 850 Drum rudiments, this book diverges from his earlier works for drum set by compiling basic rudimental snare exercises from different cultures and traditions including Drum Corps International hybrid rudiments, Ancient Fife and drum corps rudiments, and European military rudiments alongside the Percussive Arts Society and National Association of Rudimental Drummers standards. Later, he published his first work of non-fiction outside of music entirely, called The Forgotten Side of Bandelier, which deals with the archeology and anthropology of the Tsankawi section of Bandelier National Monument.

In 2020, Bloom also published two books. The first, an edition of Charles Stewart Ashworth's 1812 Fife and Drum manual, A New, Useful, and Complete System of Drum Beating that updated the 19th century notation to 21st century standard drum music, was published in January. The second book was a method called Thrash Metal Drumming that detailed the types of beats and fills used in classic and modern thrash metal. It was published by Hudson Music on October 28.

Bloom again published two books in 2021. In April, he released an edition of Samuel Potter's 1817 drum manual The Art of Beating the Drum that updated the ambiguous 19th century notation to modern percussion music. In June, he announced that Hudson would be releasing a book called Subdivide and Conquer, in collaboration with author Robert W. Miller, a method for counting and reading rhythms.

In 2022, Bloom published an English translation of the Swiss military's World War I drum manual Tambour-Ordonnanz für die Schweizerische Infanterie 1917, which had only previously been available in French and German. He also contributed an article to Percussive Notes called "The Inverted Flam Tap: a Multinational History".

Bloom published two books in 2023. In February he released an English translation of N. Pita's 1885 rudimental manual Méthode de Tambour and in March Rudimental Grand Tour was released, his first book with publisher Mel Bay.

In 2024, Bloom published three books. In January, an annotated re-printing of The Moeller Book, by Sanford A. Moeller, based on the first edition from 1925, followed by a July release of Italian Rudimental Drumming, an original publication that describes the historic military drumming tradition of the Kingdom of Italy. He further published an annotated re-printing of Fred Poole's early 20th century manual Side Drum Tutor in November.

In 2025, Bloom released A Field Guide to 50 Drum Rudiments with co-author James A. Musser on the imprint Ruffe Dragg Press.

Bloom published two books in 2026 with Ruffe Dragg Press, a translation of the Spanish language manual Toques de Guerra by Manuel de Espinosa and an annotated reproduction of the Ludwig Elementary Drum Method by Andrew V. Scott, which had previously only been available with the purchase of a Ludwig Drums trap kit in the 1920s.

== Education ==
Ryan holds a BA in music from the University of Colorado at Boulder (2007).

== Discography ==
- 2005 – Errant – Perfect Secret (demo)
- 2009 – Havok – Burn (LP)
- 2010 – Mordheim – Brutal Demonstrations (demo)
- 2011 – Amara Grace – Can't Keep A Sunrise Down (LP)
- 2012 – Amish Warfare – Immaculate Misconception (EP)
- 2014 - Bloodstrike - Necrobirth (demo)
- 2015 - Bloodstrike - In Death We Rot (LP)
- 2017 - Bloodstrike - Execution of Violence (LP)
- 2025 - Bloodstrike - Weapons of Steel (EP)

== Bibliography ==
- 2012 – Double Bass Drumming Explained: A Comprehensive Reference on the Art and Science of Double Bass
- 2013 – Double Bass Drumming Explained Part 2: The Workbook
- 2016 – The Complete Double Bass Drumming Explained- The Reference and The Workbook, Revised, Expanded & Updated
- 2018 – Live Drum & Bass - Breakbeats and Electronic Music for Real Drummers
- 2019 – Encyclopedia Rudimentia - The Ultimate Drum Rudiment Collection
- 2019 - The Forgotten Side of Bandelier - Archeology of the Tsankawi Ruins at Bandelier National Monument
- 2020 - A New, Useful, and Complete System of Drum Beating (transcribed) - Charles Stewart Ashworth
- 2020 - Thrash Metal Drumming
- 2021 - The Art of Beating the Drum (transcribed) - Samuel L. Potter
- 2021 - Subdivide and Conquer (with Robert W. Miller)
- 2022 - Tambour-Ordonnanz 1917 (translated) - Schweizerische Militardepartement
- 2023 - Méthode de Tambour - Containing all the official Batteries d’Ordonnance, a large number of marches for solo drum, and for drum and bugle (translated) - N. Pita (Gustave Pessard)
- 2023 - Rudimental Grand Tour - Drumming Across 22 International Traditions
- 2024 - Instructor in the Art of Snare Drumming - with Chapters on The Fife, The Bugle, and The Corps (annotated 1st ed. reproduction) - Sanford A. Moeller
- 2024 - Italian Rudimental Drumming - Details of the 19th Century Military System
- 2024 - Side Drum Tutor - The Easiest Method of Learning to Beat the Side Drum (annotated reproduction) - Fred H. Poole
- 2025 - A Field Guide to 50 Drum Rudiments (with James A. Musser)
- 2026 - Toques de Guerra (translated) - Manuel de Espinosa de los Monteros
- 2026 - Ludwig Elementary Drum Method (annotated 1st ed. reproduction) - Andrew V. Scott
