= Bloodstrike (band) =

American death metal band

- Origin: Denver, Colorado, U.S.
- Genres: Death metal, Swedish death metal, death 'n' roll
- Years active: 2013–2025
- Labels: Redefining Darkness, Raw Skull, Transcending
- Members: Holly Wedel; Jeff Alexis; Ryan Alexander Bloom
- Past members: Rhiannon Wisniewski; Joe Piker

Bloodstrike is an American death metal band formed in 2013. The band is a prominent name in the resurgence of the old school Swedeath or Swedish death metal scene, utilizing the classic Hm-2 'chainsaw' guitar tone.

== History ==
Bloodstrike was formed in Denver, Colorado by guitarist Jeff Alexis and vocalist Holly Wedel in 2013 with the intent of playing an old school style of death metal. Alexis formerly played bass in the thrash band Silencer with Ritchie Wilkinson of Angel Dust and Demons and Wizards, and had known Wedel as the vocalist of Torrid Flesh, which included Satan's Host member Marcus Garcia, and Nexhymn, who Alexis played bass for occasionally. Garcia would later fill in on bass with Bloodstrike, as well as Richie Tice of Speedwolf and Havok. They next contacted friend Joe Piker to play guitar because of his taste in music and past work with bands like Clusterfux, Dripfed, and Doomed Youth. After writing a few riffs, they searched for a drummer and eventually found Ryan Alexander Bloom, ex-Havok, after asking him if any of his students would be a good fit. He said no, but that he was personally interested. The group was rounded out with bassist Rhiannon Wisniewski, a past staple member of several bands in the Cleveland area, such as Somnus, Dark Arena, Acheron, Avernus, Noctuary, Nordic Mist, and Sanctorum, and also a former member of Denver bands Of Man and Machine, Moth, and Sar Isatum.

Bloodstrike recorded their 3 track demo Necrobirth at Firestorm Studios in Lakewood, CO in 2014 and released it on June 16 of that year. The demo was quite popular in the death metal underground and was given excellent reviews. The members of Bloodstrike, collectively, were well versed in the music industry. Bloom had been signed to Britain's Candlelight Records with Havok, Alexis had been signed to Belgium's Mausoleum Records with Silencer, Wisniewski had been on Root of All Evil Records with Somnus, and Piker had been on Less Art Records when in Clusterfux. They used this experience and the success of the demo to shop labels and eventually secure a deal with Redefining Darkness Records in 2015. Other factors in their quick rise to success included that Bloom and label owner Thomas Haywood (ex-Abigail Williams) had been signed to Candlelight Records concurrently in 2008, and that Wisniewski and Haywood both came up and the Cleveland scene and were aware of one another's work prior to Bloodstrike.

On September 25, 2015, Bloodstrike released their debut album In Death We Rot on Redefining Darkness Records. The album was recorded, once again, at Firestorm Studios and was mixed by Patrick Bruss of Crypticus and mastered by Ken Sorceron of Abigail Williams This album was met with positive criticism and comparisons to bands like Entombed, Grave, and Bolt Thrower and the band embarked on a supporting US tour in 2016. The track "Abomination" was featured on the 2016 Transcending Records compilation Music From A Desolate World.

Almost immediately after the release their first album, Bloodstrike began working on their follow-up, Execution of Violence. The sophomore album was released on October 13, 2017, on Redefining Darkness Records in the USA and Canada and on Dutch label Raw Skull Recordz in Europe. It was recorded at Firestorm Studios and was mixed by John Bart Van Der Wal and mastered by Dan Swanö of Bloodbath, Edge of Sanity, and Nightingale fame. It has also been met with positive reviews, and coverage in nationally recognized metal publications. Immediately after the release of the album, Bloodstrike began a round of US touring for the album with Brazilian band Forceps, including an appearance at the inaugural Denver Death Fest.

On October 4, 2025, Bloodstrike released a three track EP entitled Weapons of Steel, featuring a cover of Slayer's "Mandatory Suicide" as well as two original songs, for the 10th anniversary of their 2015 debut album In Death We Rot. This was the first release without original members Wisniewski and Piker, with Alexis handling all guitars and Patrick Russell taking bass duties. The EP also features guest vocalists Rob Seeley, Nadine Lisica, and "D."

== Members ==
- Jeff Alexis – guitars (2013–present)
- Holly Wedel – vocals (2013–present)
- Ryan Alexander Bloom – drums (2013–present)

Former members

- Rhiannon Wisniewski – bass (2013–2017)
- Joe Piker – guitars (2013–2018)

Session members

- Marcus Garcia – bass (2017)
- Patrick Russell - bass (2025)
- Rob Seeley - guest vocals (2025)
- Nadine Lisica - guest backup vocals (2025)
- D - guest gang vocals (2025)

== Discography ==
=== Demos and EPs ===
- Necrobirth demo (2014)
- Weapons of Steel EP (2025)

=== Full-length albums ===
- In Death We Rot (2015)
- Execution of Violence (2017)

=== Videos ===
- Abomination (2015)
- Bells of Death (2016)
