= Enemy Unbound =

Studio album by The Absence
- Released: September 10, 2010
- Recorded: November 2009 - 2010
- Studio: Mana Studios
- Genre: Melodic death metal
- Length: 56:50
- Label: Metal Blade
- Producer: The Absence

The Absence chronology
Riders of the Plague (2007)	Enemy Unbound (2010)	A Gift for the Obsessed (2018)

Professional ratings
Review scores
Source	Rating
AllMusic	3/5 stars
Rock Hard	8/10
Metal.de	6/10
Metalitalia.com	5/10
Powermetal.de	7/10
Chronicles of Chaos	7.5/10

Enemy Unbound is the third studio album by melodic death metal band The Absence. It was released on September 10, 2010, through Metal Blade Records.

== Track listing ==
No.	Title	Length
1.	"Vertigo"	1:23
2.	"Erased"	4:24
3.	"Deepest Wound"	5:33
4.	"Maelstrom"	4:48
5.	"Enemy Unbound"	5:03
6.	"Solace"	2:38
7.	"The Bridge"	5:03
8.	"Wartorn"	5:36
9.	"Hidden in White"	5:20
10.	"Vengeance and Victory"	5:04
11.	"Triumph"	11:58
Total length:		56:50

== Personnel ==
- Jaime Stewart - vocals
- Peter Joseph - lead & rhythm guitar
- Patrick Pintavalle - lead & rhythm guitar
- Mike Leon - bass
- Justin Reynolds - drums
