= Mike Leon =

American bassist (born 1987)

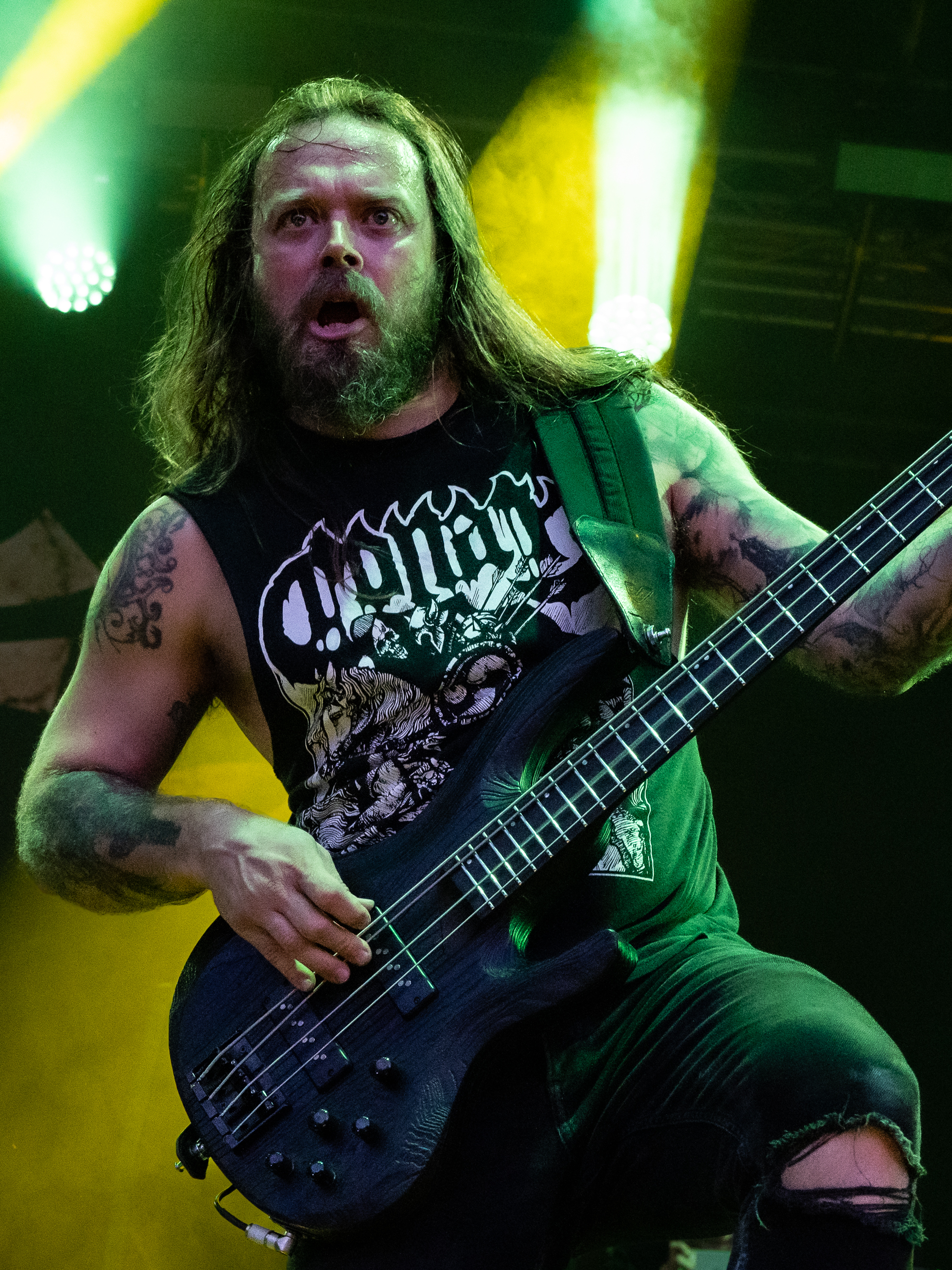
- Leon performing with Soulfly in 2023

Background information
- Born: Michael Joseph Leon; April 20, 1987 (age 38); Tampa, Florida, U.S.
- Genres: Thrash metal; groove metal; death metal; melodic death metal
- Occupation: Bassist
- Years active: 2000s–present
- Formerly of: Havok; Soulfly; The Absence; Cavalera Conspiracy; CKY

Michael Joseph Leon (born April 20, 1987) is an American musician. He was the bassist in Havok, Soulfly, The Absence, Cavalera Conspiracy, and CKY.

== Biography ==
Leon first played the violin in school, while also singing in a choir before picking up guitar after discovering Metallica. He acquired his first bass when he was 10. His influences include Cliff Burton, Flea and Steve Harris, as well as Justin Chancellor and David Ellefson.

Leon's first significant band was The Absence, a Florida-based melodic death metal band which has also featured Jeramie Kling (later of Massacre, Venom Inc., and Overkill), Taylor Nordberg (later of Soilwork, Massacre, and Deicide), and Joey Concepcion (later of Sanctuary, Dark Tranquillity, and Arch Enemy). Leon played with The Absence from 2007 until he was fired in 2021. He has stated that his dismissal was not amicable.

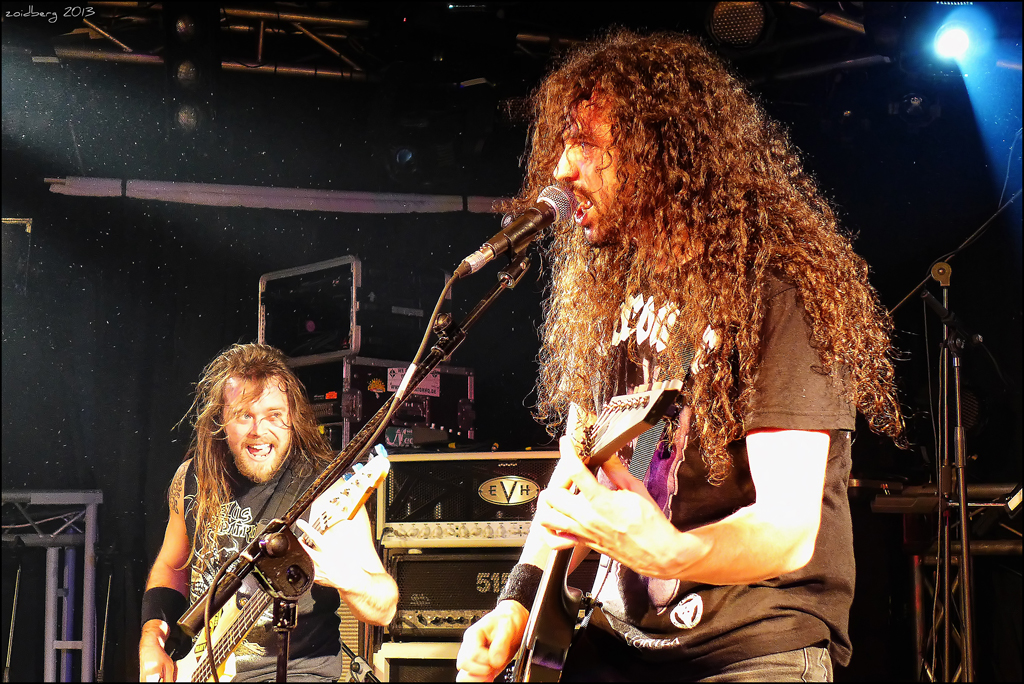
Leon (left) and David Sanchez performing with Havok in 2013

In 2013, Leon joined Havok, having previously supported the band with The Absence. He played on their album Unnatural Selection (2013) before departing in 2015 and joining Soulfly.

While still in Soulfly, he played in Cavalera Conspiracy (now known as Cavalera), a side project of Soulfly founder Max Cavalera and his brother Igor (both ex-Sepultura). He played with the band in 2017, 2018–2019, and 2022.

Leon played with Soulfly for 10 years, playing on two of their studio albums, Ritual (2018) and Totem (2022). He left the band in April 2025 to "pursue other opportunities".

In July 2025, he joined CKY, having previously been a fan of the band. He made his debut at the Vans Warped tour that same month. On February 20, 2026, he announced on Instagram that he left CKY however a video statement from frontman Chad I Ginsburg contested this narrative, advising the band fired Leon due to disagreements about touring and money, stating “I don't know what Mike Leon is talking about in his post. However, I do know the facts and the facts are, Mike, and you know them too, is that we fired you last night because you hate dogs and you didn't want to tour with the dogs and you wanted more money and you weren't happy with anything ever. So unfortunately it's not working out, Mike.”
