= Paganizer =

Swedish death metal band

- Origin: Västervik, Sweden
- Genres: Death metal
- Years active: 1998–present
- Labels: Asphyxiate; Imperium; Suffer; Psychic Scream; Forever Underground; Xtreem; Transcending Obscurity
- Members: Roger "Rogga" Johansson; Matthias Fiebig; Martin Klasén; Kjetil Lynghaug
- Past members: Andreas "Dea" Carlsson; Jocke Diener; Jocke Ringdahl; Oskar Nilsson; Patrik Halvarsson; Anders Bersheim; Dennis Blomberg

Paganizer is a Swedish death metal band playing the classic Swedish style metal, in the style of Grave and Dismember. The band was formed initially by Johansson, Carlsson and Jocke in 1998 after the departure of Terminal Grip since 1997.

== History ==
In early 2005 it was announced that Paganizer was finished; however, soon the band was activated once again, in the Johansson/Fiebig/Halvarsson lineup. Many members, including Rogga, are also involved in the band Ribspreader.

On 28 October 2008 Paganizer signed with Cyclone Empire Records and released their album Scandinavian Warmachine on 17 April 2009. Paganizer's long-time recorded last album, Carnage Junki, was finally released via Vic Records in November 2009.

On 6 May 2013 the band announced their latest studio album, titled World Lobotomy, released on 10 May 2010 via Cyclone Empire. Later that year, Paganizer canceled some upcoming shows, publicly blaming Andreas 'Dea' Carlsson. Dennis Blomberg replaced Carlsson as their new guitarist.

== Critical reception ==
The band is known for its adherence to the classic style of Swedish death metal. Singer and guitarist Johansson is a prolific musician in the genre, and the band's sound is sometimes attributed to his influence. Some critics have noted that the band moved toward a sound more heavy in melodic elements in their 2019 album The Tower of the Morbid, mixing this more melodic approach with core elements of Swedish death metal. Others dismiss the band for its lack of originality, while still praising the strong songwriting and production, as well as the band's enjoyability for those who are inherently partial to the genre.

== Members ==
=== Current members ===
- Roger "Rogga" Johansson – vocals, rhythm guitar (1998–present), lead guitar (2003-2009), drums (2009-2010), bass (2009-2011, 2013)
- Kjetil Lynghaug – lead guitar (2015–present)
- Matthias Fiebig – drums (2000–2009, 2013–present)
- Martin Klasén – bass (2014–present)

=== Past members ===
- Andreas "Dea" Carlsson – lead guitar (1998–2003; 2010–2013)
- Jocke Diener – bass (1998–2001)
- Jocke Ringdahl – drums (1998–2000; 2010–2013)
- Oskar Nilsson – bass (2001–2003)
- Patrik Halvarsson – bass (2004–2009)
- Anders Birsheim – bass (2011–2012)
- Dennis Blomberg – bass (2012–2014), lead guitar (2013–2015)

Timeline

== Discography ==
=== Studio albums ===
- Deadbanger (1999)
- Promoting Total Death (2001)
- Dead Unburied (2002)
- Murder Death Kill (2003)
- No Divine Rapture (2004)
- Carnage Junkie (2008)
- Scandinavian Warmachine (2009)
- Into the Catacombs (2011)
- World Lobotomy (2013)
- Land of Weeping Souls (2017)
- The Tower of Morbid (2019)
- Beyond the Macabre (2022)
- Flesh Requiem (2024)
- As Mankind Rots (2026)

=== EPs ===
- In Glory's Arms We Will Fall (1999)
- Warlust (1999) (Unreleased)
- Chapel of Blood (2006)
- Unglaube/Split Wide Open (2008)
- Born To Be Buried Alive (2008)
- Sore/Paganizer – (2009)
- Demonical vs. Paganizer (2010)
- Cadaver Casket (On a Gurney to Hell) (2013)
- The Portal (2016)
- As Sanity Dies (2016)
- On the Outskirts of Hades (2016)
- Sherdil (2016)
- Forest of Shub Niggurath (2024)

=== Singles ===
- Ode to the Horde/Cyclone Empire (2009)

=== Demos ===
- Stormfire (1998)

=== Compilation albums ===
- Death Forever – The Pest of Paganizer (2004)
- Deadbanger/Promoting Total Death/Dead Unburied/Warlust (2005)
- Basic Instructions for Dying (2009)
- 20 Years in a Terminal Grip (2014)
