= Point of No Return (Havok EP) =

EP by Havok
- Released: May 22, 2012
- Genre: Thrash metal
- Length: 20:21
- Label: Candlelight

Havok chronology
Time Is Up (2011)	Point of No Return (2012)	Unnatural Selection (2013)

Professional ratings
Review scores
Source	Rating
AllMusic	2/5 stars
Exclaim!	

Point of No Return is an EP recorded by the thrash metal band, Havok. It was released on May 22, 2012, through Candlelight Records. Music videos were made for the songs "Point of No Return" and "From the Cradle to the Grave". The track "Postmortem/Raining Blood" was featured as a bonus iTunes track for the 2011 album Time Is Up.

== Track listing ==
Tracks 1 and 2 lyrics by David Sanchez, music by Havok

No.	Title	Writer(s)	Length
1.	"Point of No Return"		4:37
2.	"From the Cradle to the Grave"		5:02
3.	"Arise" (Sepultura cover)	Max Cavalera, Igor Cavalera, Andreas Kisser, Paulo Jr.	3:25
4.	"Postmortem/Raining Blood" (Slayer cover)	Jeff Hanneman	7:17
Total length:			20:21

== Personnel ==
Havok

- David Sanchez – lead vocals, rhythm guitar
- Pete Webber – drums
- Reece Scruggs – lead guitar, backing vocals
- Jesse De Los Santos – bass
