= The Absence (band) =

American melodic death metal band

- Origin: Tampa, Florida, U.S.
- Genres: Melodic death metal, thrash metal
- Years active: 2002–present
- Labels: M-Theory Audio, Metal Blade
- Members: Jamie Stewart; Jeramie Kling; Peter Joseph
- Past members: Taylor Nordberg; Patrick Pintavalle; Mike Leon; Justin Reynolds; Nicholas Calaci; Joey Concepcion
- Website: The Absence on Facebook

The Absence is an American metal band from Tampa, Florida. Their style has been described as aggressive thrash metal fused with melodic death metal in the manner of the Gothenburg sound of Scandinavian metal. They were previously signed to Metal Blade Records and are now signed to M-Theory Audio.

== History ==
The band released a self-titled EP in 2004 and followed up with their debut album, From Your Grave, in 2005. The band's second album, Riders of the Plague, was released in 2007. A review praised the album for finding an "interesting balance" between death metal and thrash metal. In 2007, bassist Michael Leon joined the band. Drummer Jeramie Kling left the band that same year and was temporarily replaced with Chris Pistillo from the Tampa death metal scene. The band recruited Justin Reynolds as their new drummer in early 2008.

The Absence stated in late 2008 that they would enter the studio to record a new album in March 2009. Due to time constraints and touring duties, the band said they would enter the studio on September 10 since the original date "wasn't the right time." The band delayed the recording of the album again and later entered Mana Recording Studios on November 2, 2009, to record Enemy Unbound. Their third studio album, Enemy Unbound, was released on September 14, 2010. It reached No. 55 on the Billboard Heatseekers chart. Jeramie Kling rejoined the band during summer 2010. On September 27, 2010, The Absence released a music video for "Enemy Unbound" from the eponymous album. As of January 1, 2013, guitarist Peter Joseph left The Absence. On January 22, 2013, it was announced that Per Nilsson of Scar Symmetry had joined the band.

On July 25, 2015, guitarist Patrick Scott Pintavalle announced on Facebook that he had left the band.

On March 30, 2021, the band announced their fifth full-length album, Coffinized. It was released June 25, 2021.

On January 4, 2024, the band announced their self-titled sixth studio album would be released on March 29.

On October 12, 2026, the band announced co-founding guitarist Peter Joseph rejoined the band after his departure in 2013.

== Band line-up ==
=== Current members ===
- Jamie Stewart – vocals (2002–present)
- Jeramie Kling – drums (2003–2007, 2010–present)
- Peter Joseph – lead guitar (2003-2013, 2026–present)

=== Former members ===
- Taylor Nordberg – guitars (2013-2025)
- Patrick Pintavalle – guitars (2002–2015)
- Nicholas Calaci – bass (2002–2007)
- Christopher Tolan – guitars (2002–2003)
- Justin Grant – drums (2002–2003)
- Peter Joseph – guitars (2003–2013)
- Mike Leon – bass (2007–2021)
- Justin Reynolds – drums (2008–2010)
- Per Nilsson – guitars (2013–2016)
- Joey Concepcion – guitars (2016–2021)

== Discography ==
=== Studio albums ===
- From Your Grave (2005)
- Riders of the Plague (2007)
- Enemy Unbound (2010)
- A Gift for the Obsessed (2018)
- Coffinized (2021)
- The Absence (2024)

=== EPs ===
- The Absence (2004)

=== Singles and music videos ===
- "From Your Grave" (2005)
- "Dead and Gone" (2008)
- "Enemy Unbound" (2010)
- "Oceans" (2013)
- "Septic Testament" (2016)
