= New Eyes (EP) =

EP by Havok
- Released: November 1, 2024
- Genre: Thrash metal
- Length: 16:08
- Label: Afterburner
- Producer: Dave Sanchez

Havok chronology
V (2020)	New Eyes (2024)

New Eyes is the second EP by the Denver-based thrash metal band Havok, released in 2024. It was released on November 1, 2024, through Afterburner Recordings. On the same day as its release, the band also premiered a music video for the song "Death Is an Illusion" on YouTube.

According to Rocknloadmag.com, vocalist and rhythm guitarist David Sanchez stated: "New Eyes is an exciting step forward as it's Havok's first independent release since the early days of the band. [...] These new songs were fun to write and I think people may be surprised by the ambiguous and metaphysical nature of the lyrics." Regarding the two cover songs, Sanchez said: "We decided to cover a classic band that nobody would expect us to… Credence Clearwater Revival [sic]. We're all CCR fans and their song, 'Commotion', was a perfect candidate for a proper 'metalizing', since most of the metal was already built-in. [...] Furthermore, he says, "We had discussed covering a Metallica song for years, but didn't want to cover a big hit that had been covered to death, so we opted for the lesser-known 'Eye of the Beholder.'"

== Track listing ==
No.	Title	Writer(s)	Length
1.	"Death Is an Illusion"	David Sánchez, Pete Webber, Reece Scruggs, Nick Schendzielos	3:30
2.	"New Eyes"	David Sánchez, Pete Webber, Reece Scruggs	3:57
3.	"Commotion" (Creedence Clearwater Revival cover)	John Fogerty	2:26
4.	"Eye of the Beholder" (Metallica cover)	James Hetfield, Lars Ulrich, Kirk Hammett	6:13
Total length:			16:08

== Personnel ==
Havok

- David Sanchez – lead vocals, rhythm guitar
- Reece Scruggs – lead guitar, backing vocals
- Pete Webber – drums
- Nick Schendzielos – bass, backing vocals
