= Ribspreader =

Swedish death metal band

- Origin: Sweden
- Genre: Death metal
- Years active: 2003–2014, 2016–present
- Labels: Vic, New Aeon Media
- Spinoff of: Paganizer
- Members: Rogga Johansson; Taylor Nordberg; Jeramie Kling
- Past members: Dan Swanö; Mattias Fiebig; Ronnie Bjornström; Johan Berglund; Andreas Karlsson; Brynjar Helgetun

Ribspreader is a Swedish death metal band.

== History ==
Ribspreader was formed in January 2003 by Rogga Johansson and Andreas Karlsson, both also of Paganizer. The band's debut album featured Swedish musician and producer Dan Swanö on drums and lead guitar.

Johansson is a prolific musician within the death metal genre, and Ribspreader's 2018 album The Van Murders: Part 2 is considered by some to be one of his more versatile and melodic projects, making it more accessible to listeners who are not strictly fans of the genre. Critical praise for 2019's Crawl and Slither was also high, with the album leading some to claim Ribspreader as Johansson's best band. Others, however, have considered Ripspreader to be nearly indistinct from his other projects, even claiming that the band stands out less because of its close adherence to the norms of Swedish death metal.

== Members ==
=== Current ===
- Roger "Rogga" Johansson – vocals, bass, guitar (2002–2014, 2016–present)
- Taylor Nordberg – guitar (2016–present)
- Jeramie Kling – drums (2016–present)

=== Former ===
- Dan Swanö – guitar, drums (2002–2004)
- Andreas Karlsson – guitar, bass (2002-2005, 2007-2014)
- Johan Berglund – drums (2004-2005)
- Mattias Fiebig – drums (2005–2007)
- Ronnie Bjornstrom – drums (2007–2009)
- Brynjar Helgetun – drums (2009–2014)

== Discography ==
=== Studio albums ===
- Bolted to the Cross (2004)
- Congregating the Sick (2005)
- Opus Ribcage MMVI (2009)
- The Van Murders (2011)
- Meathymns (2014)
- Suicide Gate – A Bridge to Death (2016)
- The Van Murders: Part 2 (2018)
- Crawl and Slither (2019)
- Crypt World (2022)
- Reap Humanity (2024)
- As Gods Devour (2025)

=== Compilations ===
- Rotten Rhythms and Rancid Rants (A Collection of Undead Spew) (2006)
- The Kult of The Pneumatic Killrod (And a Collection of Ribs) (2012)

=== Demo ===
- Ribspreader (2002)
