= Venom Inc. =

British heavy metal band

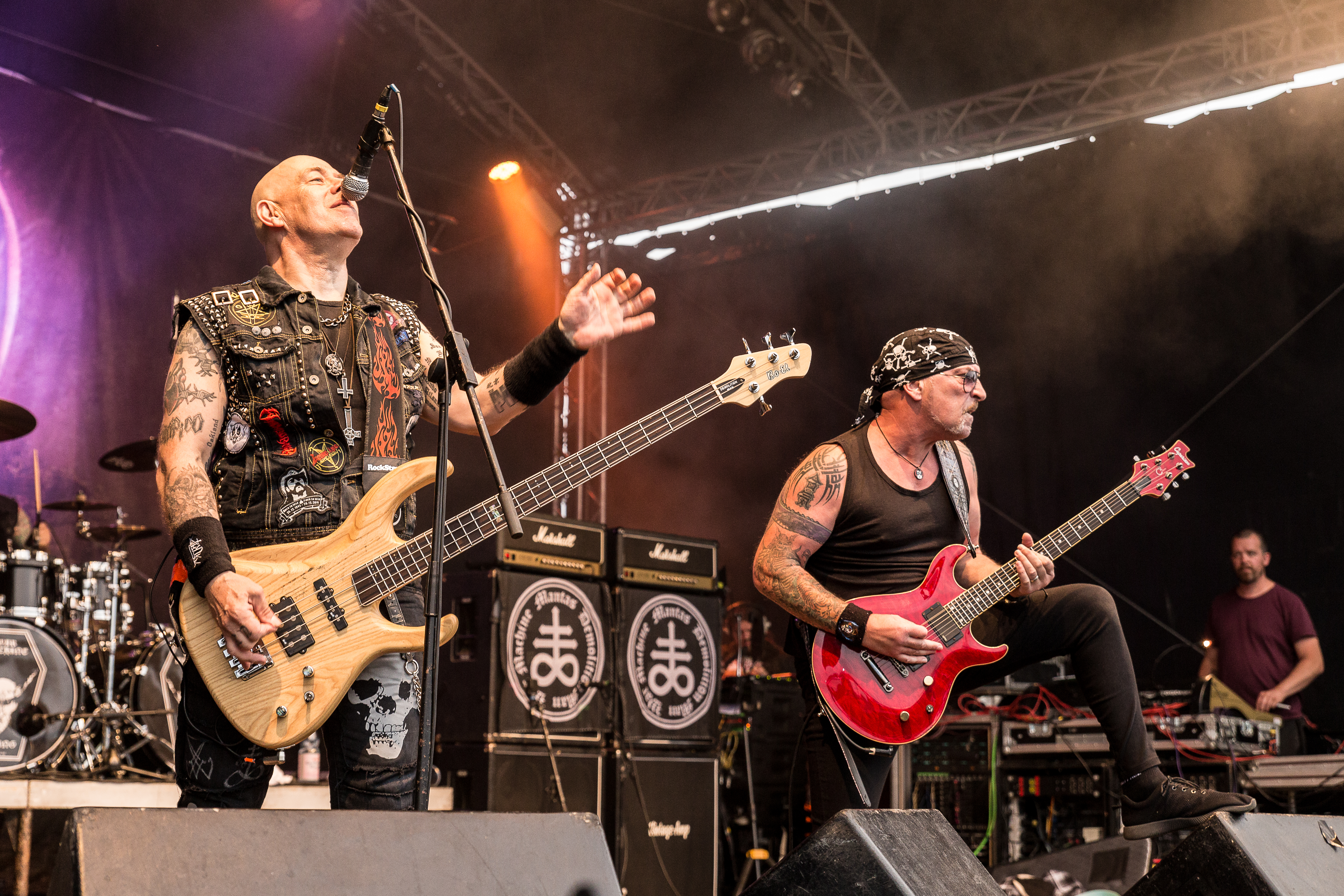
- Venom Inc. at Metal Frenzy 2019. Left to right: Tony Dolan and Jeffrey Dunn

Background information
- Origin: Newcastle upon Tyne, England
- Genres: Speed metal; thrash metal; heavy metal; first-wave black metal
- Years active: 2015–present
- Label: Nuclear Blast
- Spinoff of: Venom
- Members: Tony "Demolition Man" Dolan; Marc "JXN" Jackson; Curran "Beleth" Murphy
- Past members: Jeffrey "Mantas" Dunn; Anthony "Abaddon" Bray; Jeramie "War Machine" Kling
- Website: venom-inc.co.uk

Venom Inc. are a British heavy metal band from Newcastle upon Tyne. Formed in 2015, the band features former Venom member Tony "Demolition Man" Dolan, and previously Jeffrey "Mantas" Dunn and Anthony "Abaddon" Bray. The group has released two studio albums.

== History ==
The history of Venom Inc. goes back to April 2015, when the band Mpire of Evil (with former Venom members Jeffrey Dunn and Tony Dolan) played at Keep It True festival in Germany. At the gig, Dunn and Dolan invited drummer Anthony "Abaddon" Bray, another former Venom member, to play a few old Venom songs at the festival, although Dunn and Bray had not spoken to each other for around 20 years. This spontaneous action led to the formation of Venom Inc., which consisted of the Venom line-up from 1989 to 1992: Dunn as guitarist, Dolan as singer and bassist and Bray as drummer.

The group's debut album, Avé, was released in August 2017 by Nuclear Blast. "Dein Fleisch" and "Ave Satanas" were released as singles. In the same year, the band performed at MetalDays, among others. At the end of April 2018, Dunn suffered a heart attack, which resulted in a brief cardiac arrest. He underwent double bypass surgery and has since recovered. The band later revealed that Bray did not actually play drums on Avé and that they used a drum machine instead.

Bray took a break from band activities in early 2018 due to the birth of his daughter. However, in September 2018, he announced that he would not be returning to the band. During his break, he had learned that he had been fired and Jeramie Kling would now be the band's new drummer.

The band released their second studio album, There's Only Black, in September 2022.

In November 2023, Kling parted ways with the band due to "logistical reasons". He was replaced by Marc "JXN" Jackson in April 2024, previously of associated act Mpire of Evil.

In April 2024, Jeffrey Dunn suffered a second heart attack and is in recovery. Stepping in for tour duties is ex-Annihilator, ex-Nevermore and current 72 Legions guitar player Curran "Beleth" Murphy. In December 2024, Dunn announced he had quit the band. Later that month, Murphy was confirmed as a full member.

== Musical style ==
In a 2017 Rock Hard interview, Tony Dolan stated that Venom Inc. was more than just a cover band, and that they want to experiment and surprise with songs like "Dein Fleisch". In the same issue, Thomas Kupfer reviewed Avé, stating that the album is not for "music snobs", but offers "rowdy noise orgies". Stephan Möller from Metal.de also reviewed the album and stated that it can be categorised somewhere between the first wave of black metal as well as speed metal and thrash metal, which brought the term "black 'n' roll" and a Motörhead comparison to his mind. Compared to the Venom albums Black Metal and Welcome to Hell, Venom Inc. sounds a little "rockier" and more like Motörhead. The music also has a more modern feel. Avé is "mature and probably the cleanest album that this constellation of musicians has ever recorded".

== Members ==
=== Current members ===
- Tony "Demolition Man" Dolan – bass, lead vocals (2015–present)
- Marc "JXN" Jackson – drums (2024–present)
- Curran "Beleth" Murphy – guitars (2024–present)

=== Former members ===
- Jeffrey "Mantas" Dunn – guitars, backing vocals (2015–2024)
- Anthony "Abaddon" Bray – drums (2015–2018)
- Jeramie "War Machine" Kling – drums (2018–2023)

=== Touring members ===
- Nick Barker – drums (2022)
- Mike "Mykvs" Hickey – guitars (2023)

== Discography ==
Studio albums

- 2017: Avé (Nuclear Blast)
- 2022: There's Only Black (Nuclear Blast)

Singles

- 2017: "Dein Fleisch" (Decibel Flexi Series)
- 2018: "War" (Nuclear Blast)
- 2022: "How Many Can Die" (Nuclear Blast)
