= Avulsed =

Spanish death metal band

- Origin: Madrid, Spain
- Genres: Death metal, brutal death metal
- Years active: 1991–present
- Label: Xtreem Music
- Members: Dave Rotten; Tana; Cabra; Juancar; Arjan van der Wijst
- Past members: Lucky; Antonio Pardo "Toni"; Javi "El Largo"; Luisma; Furni; Iván; Riky; Osckar; Erik Raya
- Website: www.avulsed.com

Avulsed is a Spanish death metal band, formed in August 1991 in Madrid by Dave Rotten, who also manages the Xtreem Music record label. AllMusic described their style as "old-school brutal death metal". The band's early work has drawn comparisons to pioneering death metal and grindcore acts such as Death, Autopsy, Obituary, Carcass, and Napalm Death. The band's lyrical themes include gore, disease, pathology, and death.

== History ==
The band developed its musical style through various demos: Embalmed in Blood (1992), Deformed Beyond Belief (1993) and Promo '95 (1995), and the 7-inch EP Carnivoracity (1994). They recorded their debut album Eminence in Putrescence (1996) through Repulse Records, where the band displayed a pure death metal sound, mixing heavy riffs with melodic parts.

With Cybergore (1998), the band mixed extreme techno with their traditional death metal. In April 1999, a Colombian label offered to release all the band's demos and unreleased rare recordings on CD (Seven Years of Decay, 1999).

The second album, Stabwound Orgasm (1999), was recorded at Spacelab Studios in Kempen, Germany, and was mastered by James Murphy in California. Released by Repulse, this album doubled the sales of its predecessor and was licensed by various labels in South America (Sylphorium), USA/Canada (World War III) and Russia (IronD). In January 2001, the band entered the studio with producer Roberto Galán to record four cover songs for different tribute albums that were finally put together as a self-financed MCD (Bloodcovered, 2001) in a limited run of 500 copies available only through the band.

In August 2002, the band entered Germany's Spacelab Studios to record their third album, Yearning for the Grotesque, which came out in February 2003 through Italian label Avantgarde Music.

The band's fourth full-length album, Gorespattered Suicide, was recorded in Madrid at VRS Studios. The masters were sent to Erik Rutan of Hate Eternal / ex-Morbid Angel, who mixed and mastered the album at his Mana Recording Studios in Florida. It was released in January 2005 by Slovakian label Metal Age Productions. This was followed by a tour in Japan (April 2005), European festivals including London Deathfest, Obscene Extreme (Czech Republic), Uncover Train Fest (Paris), plus a complete European tour (15 shows/11 countries) as headliners together with Italian grindcore act Grimness 69.

Reanimations (2006) was released by Xtreem Music and shortly after also by Metal Age Productions. It included two new songs, a new version of an earlier demo song, three covers (of WASP, Gorefest and Exodus), plus eight bands performing Avulsed cover songs. September 2007 saw the first official Avulsed DVD release, Reanimating Russia 2007, recorded in Moscow in June 2007 during the band's second Russian tour, and released by Coyote Records.

After three years of touring, Avulsed focused on their fifth album, Nullo (The Pleasure of Self-Mutilation), recorded in Madrid at Room 101 Studios between October 2008 and May 2009 with engineer and producer Javier Fernández. It used artwork and design by Mike Hrubovcak. This album was simultaneously released in June 2009 through Xtreem Music and Metal Age in Europe, and Coyote in Russia, and would see upcoming releases by Ibex Moon Records in the US, American Line in Mexico/Central America and Sylphorium for the South American territory.

In March 2012, it was announced that drummer Riki had amicably parted ways with the band and replaced by Osckar.

== Members ==
=== Current members ===
- Dave Rotten – vocals (1991–present)
- Alejandro Lobo – guitar (2024–present)
- Víctor Dws – guitar (2024–present)
- Alex Nihil – bass (2024–present)
- N3uromanc3r" – drums (2025–present)

=== Former members ===
- El Largo – guitar (1991)
- Angel Luciano "Lucky" – bass (1991–1996)
- Antonio "Toni" Pardo – drums (1992–1993)
- Luis Quiroga – guitar (1992–1994)
- Raúl Díaz "Furni" – drums (1994–2004)
- Ivan – bass (1997–1998)
- Ricardo Mena "Riky" – drums (2005–2012)
- Osckar Bravo – drums (2012–2014)
- Erik Raya – drums (2014–2015)
- Arjan van der Wijst – drums (2015–2018)
- Rafael Aritmendi – drums (2018–2020)
- Jorge Utrera – drums (2020–2023)
- Jose María de Miguel – guitar (1992–2024)
- Juan Carlos Limón – guitar (1994–2024)
- Antonio Carlos Rodríguez – bass (1998–2024)
- Santiago Arroyo "Gog" – drums (2023–2025)

== Discography ==
- 1992: Embalmed in Blood (demo)
- 1993: Deformed Beyond Belief (demo)
- 1993: Live in Perfect Deformity (live-tape)
- 1993: Dead Flesh Compilation (5-Way Split)
- 1993: Split 12-inchLP with Acid Death
- 1994: Carnivoracity (7-inch EP)
- 1995: Promo '95 (demo)
- 1995: Carnivoracity (mini CD)
- 1996: Eminence in Putrescence (album)
- 1998: Cybergore (re-mixes)
- 1999: Seven Years of Decay (best-of/compilation)
- 1999: Stabwound Orgasm (album)
- 2001: Bloodcovered (mini CD)
- 2003: Yearning for the Grotesque (album)
- 2005: Gorespattered Suicide (album)
- 2006: Reanimations (album)
- 2007: Reanimating Russia 2007 (DVD)
- 2009: Nullo (The Pleasure of Self-Mutilation) (album)
- 2013: Ritual Zombi (album)
- 2015: Altar of Disembowelment (MCD/10"MLP)
- 2016: Deathgeneration (album)
- 2017: Night Of The Living Deathgenerations (live album)
- 2023: Extraterrestrial Carnage (EP)
- 2025: Phoenix Cryptobiosis (album)
