= Jeramie Kling =

American audio engineer and musician

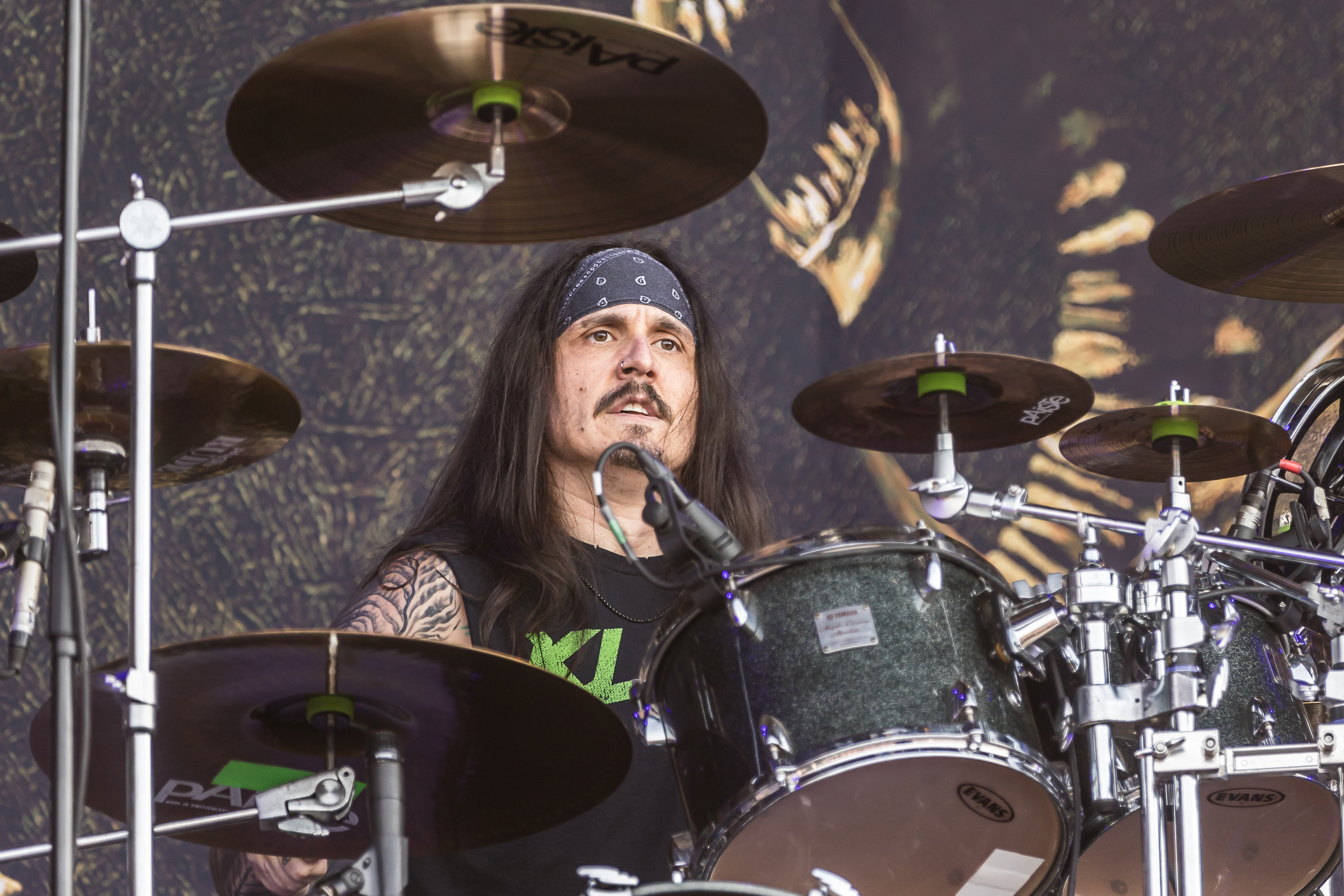
- Kling with Overkill in 2025

Background information
- Born: 1982 (age 43–44)
- Genres: Death metal, speed metal, heavy metal, thrash metal
- Occupations: Musician, audio engineer, tour manager
- Instruments: Drums, guitar, vocals
- Years active: 2003–present
- Member of: The Absence, Ribspreader, Goregäng, Necromancing the Stone, Inhuman Condition, Overkill
- Formerly of: Venom Inc., Massacre

Jeramie Kling (born 1982) is an American drummer, recording engineer, producer, and live sound engineer for the metal bands The Absence and Venom Inc. He is also a member of Ribspreader (drums), Goregäng (guitar/lead vocals), and Metal Blade act Necromancing the Stone. Kling was a member of death metal band Massacre (drums/backing vocals) from 2019 to 2020. In 2021, he formed the band Inhuman Condition with Massacre and Obituary bassist Terry Butler (ex-Death) and Taylor Nordberg. In August 2024, Kling joined thrash metal band Overkill as a touring drummer, and he is a permanent member of the band as of mid-2025.

Kling was a founding member of The Absence and played drums on four of their albums, From Your Grave (2005), Riders of the Plague (2007), Enemy Unbound (2010) and A Gift for the Obsessed (2018). Enemy Unbound reached No. 55 on the Billboard Heatseekers chart following its release. The Absence is currently signed to M-Theory Audio.

Kling became a member of Venom Inc. in 2018 following the departure of original drummer Abaddon. He uses the alias War Machine in that band. Kling departed Venom Inc. in 2023.

== Audio engineering ==
Kling has worked as a front of house audio engineer for metal bands such as Deicide, Kataklysm, Sepultura, Venom Inc. (prior to becoming a member), Exodus, Soilwork, and Arsis, among others.

== Equipment and endorsements ==
- Paiste cymbals
- Aston microphones
- Gator cases
- KLOTZ cables
- DDrum
