= Xtreem Music =

Spanish record label

- Founded: 2002
- Founder: Dave Rotten
- Genre: Extreme metal
- Country of origin: Spain
- Location: Madrid
- Official website: xtreemmusic.com

Xtreem Music is a Spanish independent record label, founded after the collapse of Repulse Records in 2002 and managed by Dave Rotten. It mainly produces extreme metal and black metal bands.

== Bands ==
- Altar of Sin
- Holocausto Canibal
- Kronos
- Avulsed
- Murder Death Kill
- Abaddon Incarnate
- Anvil of Doom
- Demigod
- Funebre
- Paganizer
- Vorkreist
- Azooma
- Dying Out Flame
- Mental Demise
- Fleshgore
- Cerebral Fix
- Grim Fate
