= List of Aborted band members =

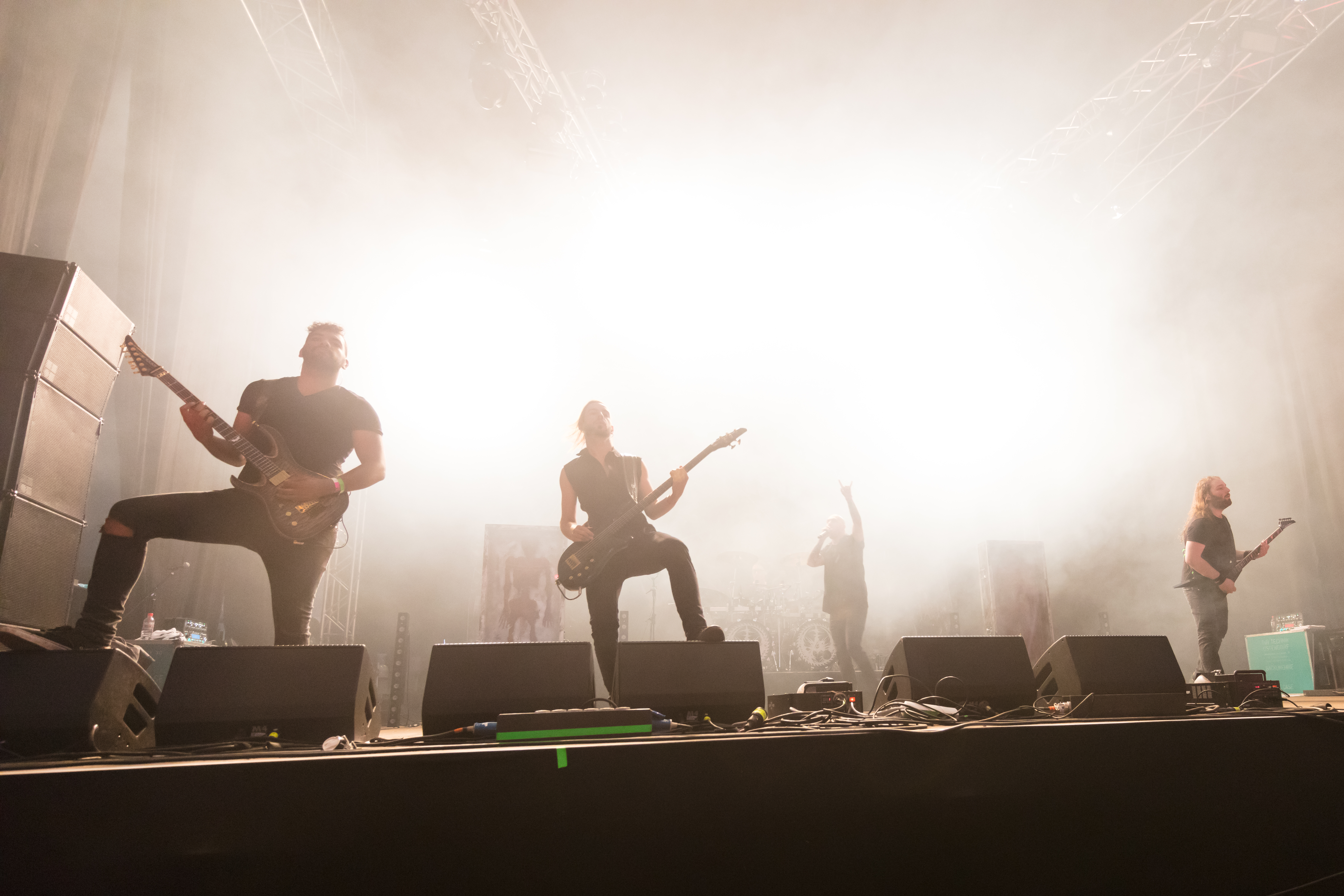
Aborted performing live in 2017.

Aborted is a Belgian death metal band from Waregem. Formed in 1995, the group is fronted by its sole constant member, vocalist Sven de Caluwé. The first recording lineup of the band in 1997 also included guitarist Niek Verstraete, bassist Koen Verstraete and drummer Steven Logie. As of the group's latest lineup change in April 2025, Caluwé is joined by guitarists Ian Jekelis (since 2015) and Daníel Máni Konráðsson (since 2022), plus new touring drummer Kevin Paradis.

== History ==
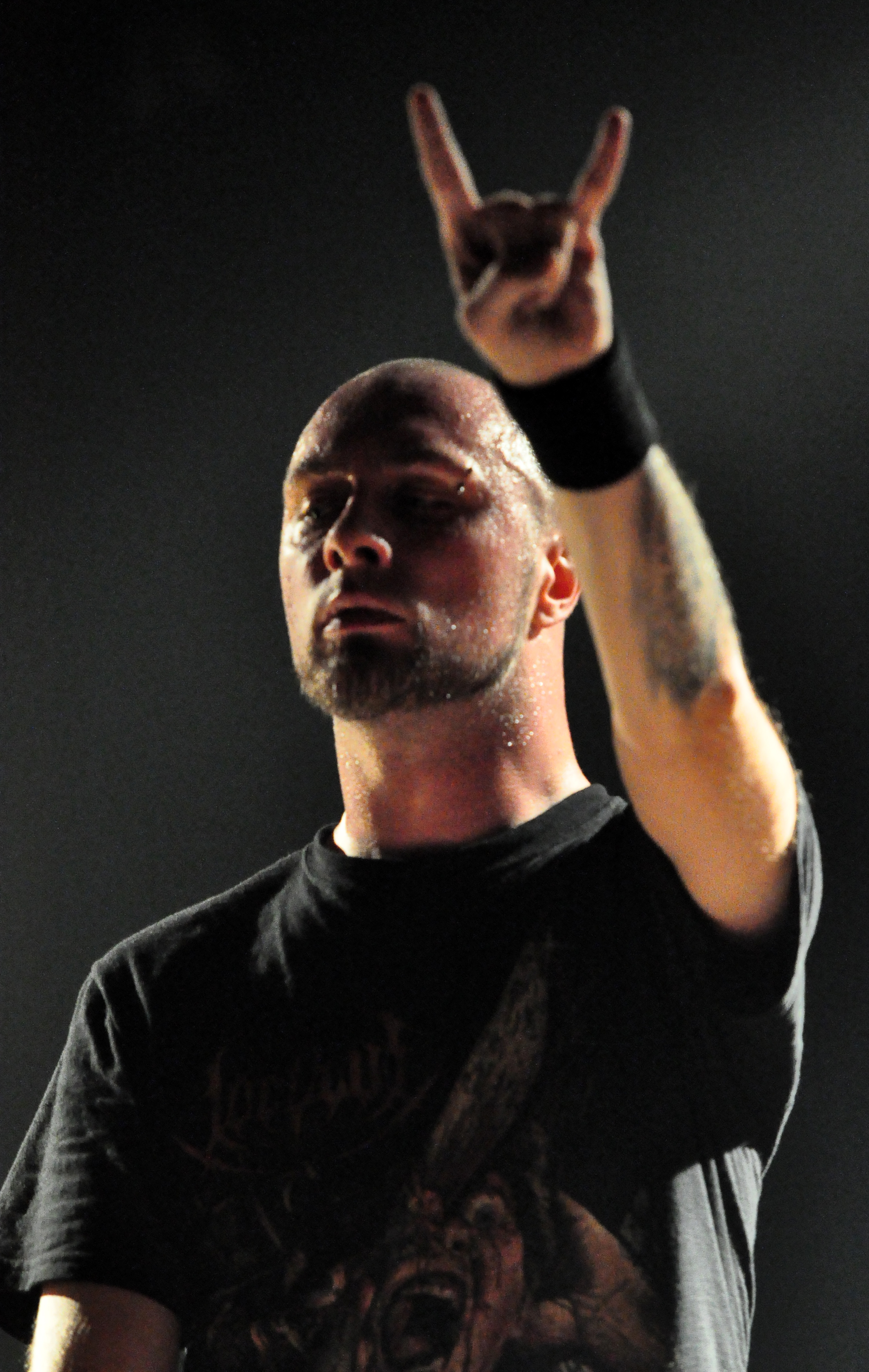
Sven de Caluwé is the sole constant member of Aborted.

=== 1995–2006 ===
Sven de Caluwé formed Aborted during the summer of 1995. After several early incarnations with various undisclosed members, he settled on his first formal lineup of the band in the summer of 1997 with guitarist Niek Verstraete, bassist Koen Verstraete and drummer Steven Logie. This lineup recorded the band's first demo The Necrotorous Chronicles in the spring of 1998, before Christophe Herreman was added as a second guitarist, and later Frank Rosseau replaced Logie, who was fired due to "lack of motivation". After the release of the band's full-length debut The Purity of Perversion, Herreman was replaced by Thijs "Tace" de Cloedt in time for its follow-up, Engineering the Dead.

By the time the band recorded Goremageddon: The Saw and the Carnage Done starting in December 2002, Niek and Koen Verstraete had been replaced by Bart Vergaert and Frederic "Fre" Vanmassenhove, respectively. The album also featured session drummer Dirk Verbeuren of Scarve, although Rosseau remained an official member until February 2004, when he left for "musical reasons". In mid-March, the band announced French drummer Gilles Delecroix as his replacement. The new lineup recorded The Archaic Abattoir, before Vergaert suddenly quit in May 2005. The band played a few shows as a quartet, before Stephane Souteyrand took over the following month.

At the start of 2006, Aborted announced that Souteyrand, along with Thijs de Cloedt and Fre Vanmassenhove, had all left the band, with their replacements named as guitarists Sebastian "Seb Purulator" Tuvi (of Balrog) and Matty Dupont (of Emeth), plus bassist Olivia "Raziel" Scemama (also of Balrog). After the release of live video The Auricular Chronicles, Scemama and Delecroix left the band due to financial issues; Dupont's Emeth bandmate Peter Goemaere was announced as the band's new bassist, while Dave Haley of Psycroptic was drafted in for the recording of Slaughter & Apparatus: A Methodical Overture, with Etienne Gallo of Negativa taking over for the subsequent tour.

=== 2007–2015 ===
For three shows coinciding with the release of Slaughter & Apparatus in February 2007, God Dethroned's Ariën van Weesenbeek filled in on drums. Later that month, 17-year-old Daniel Wilding from England became Aborted's new full-time drummer. Around the summer of 2007, bassist Peter Goemaere switched to guitar following the departure of Matty Dupont, with Sven "Svenchini" Janssens brought in to take over on bass. The new lineup released the band's sixth album Strychnine.213 the following year.

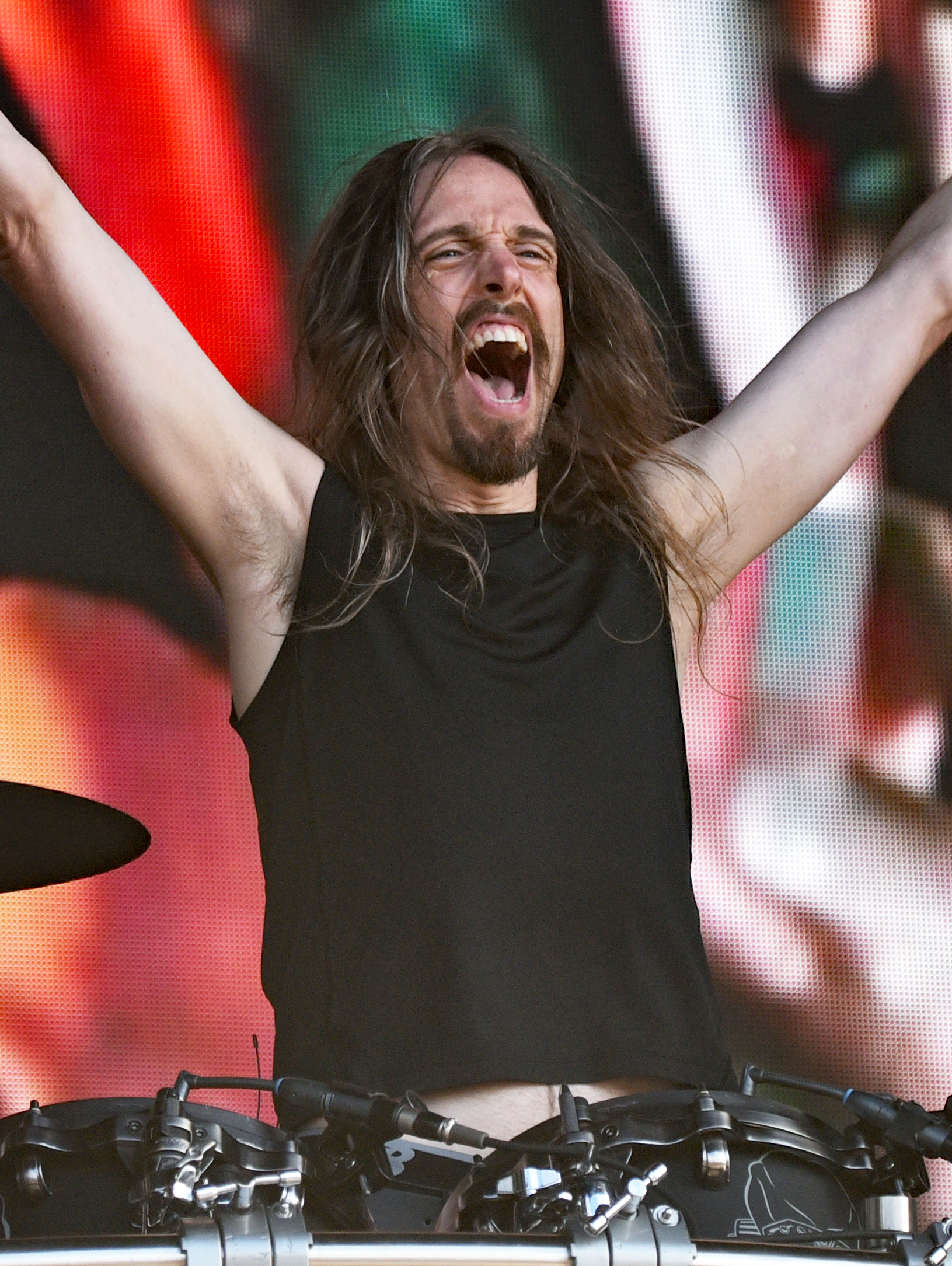
Former session drummer Dirk Verbeuren returned briefly to Aborted in late 2009.

In December 2009, frontman Sven de Caluwé announced an entirely new lineup of Aborted consisting of his System Divide bandmate Cole Martinez on bass, former session drummer Dirk Verbeuren, plus guitarists Eran Segal and Ken Sorceron. According to Verbeuren, the new lineup came together around October, then recorded the EP Coronary Reconstruction the next month. Outgoing guitarist Seb Purulator claimed that de Caluwé had not informed him or his bandmates that they were being replaced, and that the way the band was run had created financial difficulties for all four musicians. Verbeuren was unable to tour with Aborted in promotion of Coronary Reconstruction due to his commitments with Soilwork, so he was replaced by Ken Bedene, who later became an official band member. John-Bart "J. B." van der Wal replaced Martinez during the summer of 2010.

Just before recording began for the band's next album, Sorceron announced his departure from Aborted in April 2011 to focus on his other band, Abigail Williams. He was replaced for the recording of Global Flatline by Michael Wilson. Shortly after the recording, van der Wal left the band, with Kevin Verlay filling in for shows in the fall of 2011. The following spring, Joshua Neale briefly took over as the band's touring bassist. Later in 2012, van der Wal rejoined Aborted, while guitarists Segal and Wilson were replaced by Mendel bij de Leij and Danny Tunker. This lineup released The Necrotic Manifesto in 2014 and the Termination Redux EP in 2016.

=== Since 2015 ===
After recording Termination Redux in the summer, Danny Tunker left Aborted in September 2015. He was replaced by Ian Jekelis, with whom the band recorded their 2016 album Retrogore. In late 2016, J. B. van der Wal left for a second time, replaced by Stefano Franceschini. The new lineup released TerrorVision in 2018, before Mendel bij de Leij left in February 2019 and was replaced by Harrison Patuto. Originally a touring stand-in, the guitarist became an official member of the band in February 2020. After recording the EP La Grande Mascarade, Patuto left during 2021 and the band recorded ManiaCult as a quartet.

In October 2022, Aborted announced the addition of Daníel Máni Konráðsson in the vacated second guitarist position. The band released Vault of Horrors in 2024, which was the last album to feature bassist Stefano Franceschini, who announced his departure at the beginning of the year to focus on his education, with the band opting to use a bass backing track instead of replacing him. It also ended up being the last Aborted album to feature Ken Bedene on drums, who was dismissed in April 2025 after 15 years with the band. A couple of weeks after his departure, Bedene explained in his statement posted on his Instagram "I left the band to distance them from this", following allegations of sexual misconduct relating to conversations he had with an underage fan online that attended a recent show.

Bedene was replaced immediately on tour by Kevin Paradis.

== Official members ==
=== Current ===
Image	Name	Years active	Instruments	Release contributions
	Sven "Svencho" de Caluwé	1995–present	vocals	all Aborted releases
	Ian Jekelis	2015–present	guitars	all Aborted releases from Retrogore (2016) onwards
	Daníel Máni Konráðsson	2022–present	guitars	Vault of Horrors (2024); "The Pain, Will Be Exquisite" (2025)

=== Former ===
Image	Name	Years active	Instruments	Release contributions
	Niek Verstraete	1997–2002	guitars	all Aborted releases from The Necrotorous Chronicles (1998) to Extirpated Live Emanations (2003)
	Koen Verstraete	1997–2002	bass	all Aborted releases from The Necrotorous Chronicles (1998) to Extirpated Live Emanations (2003)
	Steven Logie	1997–1998	drums	The Necrotorous Chronicles (1998)
	Christophe Herreman	1998–2000	guitars	The Purity of Perversion (1999); Split with Christ Denied (2000)
	Frank Rosseau	1998–2004	drums	all Aborted releases from The Purity of Perversion (1999) to Extirpated Live Emanations (2003); The Haematobic EP (2004)
	Thijs "Tace" de Cloedt	2000–2006	guitars	all Aborted releases from Engineering the Dead (2001) to The Archaic Abattoir (2005)
	Frederic "Fre" Vanmassenhove	2002–2006	bass	Goremageddon: The Saw and the Carnage Done (2003); The Haematobic EP (2004); The Archaic Abattoir (2005)
	Bart Vergaert	2002–2005	guitars	Goremageddon: The Saw and the Carnage Done (2003); The Haematobic EP (2004); The Archaic Abattoir (2005)
	Dirk Verbeuren	2003–2004 (session only); 2009–2010	drums	Goremageddon: The Saw and the Carnage Done (2003); The Haematobic EP (2004); Coronary Reconstruction (2010)
	Gilles Delecroix	2004–2006	drums	The Archaic Abattoir (2005); The Auricular Chronicles (2006)
	Stephane Souteyrand	2005–2006	guitars	none
	Seb Purulator (real name Sebastian Tuvi)	2006–2009	guitars; backing vocals	The Auricular Chronicles (2006); Slaughter & Apparatus: A Methodical Overture (2007); Strychnine.213 (2008)
	Matty Dupont	2006–2007	guitars	The Auricular Chronicles (2006); Slaughter & Apparatus: A Methodical Overture (2007)
	Olivia "Raziel" Scemama	2006	bass	The Auricular Chronicles (2006)
	Peter Goemaere	2006–2009	bass (2006–2007); guitars (2007–2009)	Slaughter & Apparatus: A Methodical Overture (2007); Strychnine.213 (2009)
	Daniel Wilding	2007–2009	drums	Strychnine.213 (2009)
	Sven "Svenchini" Janssens	2007–2009	bass; samples	Strychnine.213 (2009)
	Eran Segal	2009–2012	guitars	Coronary Reconstruction (2010); Global Flatline (2012)
	Ken Sorceron (real name Ken Bergeron)	2009–2011	guitars	Coronary Reconstruction (2010)
	Cole Martinez	2009–2010	bass; samples	Strychnine.213 (2009); Coronary Reconstruction (2010)
	Ken Bedene	2010–2025	drums; samples; occasional keyboards	all Aborted releases from Global Flatline (2012) to "The Pain, Will Be Exquisite" (2025)
	J. B. van der Wal	2010–2011; 2012–2016	bass	Global Flatline (2012); The Necrotic Manifesto (2014); Termination Redux (2016); Retrogore (2016)
	Michael Wilson	2011–2012	guitars	Global Flatline (2012)
	Mendel bij de Leij	2012–2019	guitars	The Necrotic Manifesto (2014); Termination Redux (2016); Retrogore (2016); TerrorVision (2018)
	Danny Tunker	2012–2015	guitars	The Necrotic Manifesto (2014); Termination Redux (2016)
	Stefano Franceschini	2016–2024	bass	all Aborted releases from TerrorVision (2018) to "The Pain, Will Be Exquisite" (2025)
	Harrison Patuto	2019–2021	guitars	La Grande Mascarade (2020)

== Stand-in members ==
Image	Name	Years active	Instruments	Details
	Dave Haley	2006 (session)	drums	After the departure of Gilles Delecroix, Haley performed on Slaughter & Apparatus: A Methodical Overture.
	Etienne Galo	2006 (touring)	drums	Galo joined the band temporarily for tour dates starting in October 2006, after Haley's brief session tenure.
	Ariën van Weesenbeek	2007 (touring)	drums	van Weesenbeek filled in on drums for three Slaughter & Apparatus release shows in February 2007.
	Kevin Verlay	2011–2012 (touring)	bass	Verlay filled in on bass during late 2011 and early 2012 after the departure of J. B. van der Wal.
	Joshua Neale	2012 (touring)	bass	Neale took over from Verlay during the spring of 2012, before leaving due to personal reasons in May.
	Kevin Paradis	2025 (touring)	drums	Paradis joined after Ken Bedene's departure in April 2025 to tour Europe.
	Siebe Hermans	2025–present (touring)	drums	Hermans stepped in from Stefan's side project Coffin Feeder for their North American tour with Cattle Decapitation.

== Lineups ==
Period	Members	Releases
Summer 1995–summer 1997	Sven de Caluwé — vocals; Other members unknown	none
Summer 1997–1998	Sven de Caluwé — vocals; Niek Verstraete — guitars; Koen Verstraete — bass; Steven Logie — drums	The Necrotorous Chronicles (1998)
1998	Sven de Caluwé — vocals; Niek Verstraete — guitars; Koen Verstraete — bass; Steven Logie — drums; Christophe Herreman — guitars	none
1998–2000	Sven de Caluwé — vocals; Niek Verstraete — guitars; Koen Verstraete — bass; Christophe Herreman — guitars; Frank Rosseau — drums	The Purity of Perversion (1999); Split with Christ Denied (2000)
2000–2002	Sven de Caluwé — vocals; Niek Verstraete — guitars; Koen Verstraete — bass; Frank Rosseau — drums; Thijs de Cloedt — guitars	Engineering the Dead (2001); Created to Kill (2002); Extirpated Live Exhumations (2003)
Late 2002–February 2004	Sven de Caluwé — vocals; Thijs de Cloedt — guitars; Frank Rosseau — drums (touring only); Bart Vergaert — guitars; Frederic Vanmassenhove — bass; Dirk Verbeuren — drums (session only)	Goremageddon: The Saw and the Carnage Done (2003); The Haematobic EP (2004)
March 2004–May 2005	Sven de Caluwé — vocals; Thijs de Cloedt — guitars; Bart Vergaert — guitars; Frederic Vanmassenhove — bass; Gilles Delecroix — drums	The Archaic Abattoir (2005)
May–June 2005	Sven de Caluwé — vocals; Thijs de Cloedt — guitars; Frederic Vanmassenhove — bass; Gilles Delecroix — drums	none
June 2005–January 2006	Sven de Caluwé — vocals; Thijs de Cloedt — guitars; Frederic Vanmassenhove — bass; Gilles Delecroix — drums; Stephane Souteyrand — guitars	none
January–September 2006	Sven de Caluwé — lead vocals; Gilles Delecroix — drums; Seb Purulator — guitars, backing vocals; Matty Dupont — guitars; Olivia Scemama — bass	The Auricular Chronicles (2006)
September 2006	Sven de Caluwé — lead vocals; Seb Purulator — guitars, backing vocals; Matty Dupont — guitars; Peter Goemaere — bass; Dave Haley — drums (session only)	Slaughter & Apparatus: A Methodical Overture (2007)
October–November 2006	Sven de Caluwé — lead vocals; Seb Purulator — guitars, backing vocals; Matty Dupont — guitars; Peter Goemaere — bass; Etienne Galo — drums (touring only)	none
February 2007	Sven de Caluwé — lead vocals; Seb Purulator — guitars, backing vocals; Matty Dupont — guitars; Peter Goemaere — bass; Ariën van Weesenbeek — drums (touring only)	none
February–summer 2007	Sven de Caluwé — lead vocals; Seb Purulator — guitars, backing vocals; Matty Dupont — guitars; Peter Goemaere — bass; Daniel Wilding — drums	none
Summer 2007–summer 2009	Sven de Caluwé — lead vocals; Seb Purulator — guitars, backing vocals; Peter Goemaere — guitars; Daniel Wilding — drums; Sven Janssens — bass, samples	Strychnine.213 (2009)
October 2009–early 2010	Sven de Caluwé — vocals; Dirk Verbeuren — drums; Eran Segal — guitars; Ken Sorceron — guitars; Cole Martinez — bass, samples	Coronary Reconstruction (2010)
Early–summer 2010	Sven de Caluwé — vocals; Eran Segal — guitars; Ken Sorceron — guitars; Cole Martinez — bass, samples; Ken Bedene — drums	none
Summer 2010–April 2011	Sven de Caluwé — vocals; Eran Segal — guitars; Ken Sorceron — guitars; Ken Bedene — drums; J. B. van der Wal — bass	none
Summer/fall 2011	Sven de Caluwé — vocals; Eran Segal — guitars; Ken Bedene — drums; J. B. van der Wal — bass; Michael Wilson — guitars	Global Flatline (2012)
Late 2011–early 2012	Sven de Caluwé — vocals; Eran Segal — guitars; Ken Bedene — drums; Michael Wilson — guitars; Kevin Verlay — bass (touring only)	none
Early/spring 2012	Sven de Caluwé — vocals; Eran Segal — guitars; Ken Bedene — drums; Michael Wilson — guitars; Joshua Neale — bass (touring only)	none
Summer 2012–September 2015	Sven de Caluwé — vocals; Ken Bedene — drums; J. B. van der Wal — bass; Mendel bij de Leij — guitars; Danny Tunker — guitars	The Necrotic Manifesto (2014); Termination Redux (2016)
Fall 2015–late 2016	Sven de Caluwé — vocals; Ken Bedene — drums; J. B. van der Wal — bass; Mendel bij de Leij — guitars; Ian Jekelis — guitars	Retrogore (2016)
Late 2016–February 2019	Sven de Caluwé — vocals; Ken Bedene — drums; Mendel bij de Leij — guitars; Ian Jekelis — guitars; Stefano Franceschini — bass	TerrorVision (2018)
February 2019–spring 2021	Sven de Caluwé — vocals; Ken Bedene — drums; Ian Jekelis — guitars; Stefano Franceschini — bass; Harrison Patuto — guitars	La Grande Mascarade (2020)
Spring 2021–October 2022	Sven de Caluwé — vocals; Ken Bedene — drums; Ian Jekelis — guitars; Stefano Franceschini — bass	ManiaCult (2021)
October 2022–January 2024	Sven de Caluwé — vocals; Ken Bedene — drums; Ian Jekelis — guitars; Stefano Franceschini — bass; Daníel Máni Konráðsson — guitars	Vault of Horrors (2024); "The Pain, Will Be Exquisite" (2025)
January 2024–April 2025	Sven de Caluwé — vocals; Ken Bedene — drums; Ian Jekelis — guitars; Daníel Máni Konráðsson — guitars	none
April–November 2025	Sven de Caluwé — vocals; Ian Jekelis — guitars; Daníel Máni Konráðsson — guitars; Kevin Paradis — drums (touring only)	none
November 2025—present	Sven de Caluwé — vocals; Ian Jekelis — guitars; Daníel Máni Konráðsson — guitars; Siebe Hermans — drums (touring only)	none to date
