= Amsterdam Metalfest =

- Genre: Metal, Death metal, Thrash metal, Black metal, Progressive metal
- Dates: April, October
- Locations: Melkweg, Amsterdam
- Years active: 2013 – 2016

Amsterdam Metalfest was a biannual metalfestival that took place in the Netherlands' capital city, Amsterdam. As from 2015, it was held in the much acclaimed venue Melkweg (Dutch for "Milky Way") and organised by Metal Amsterdam. Amsterdam Metalfest endeavors to provide a stage for local and (inter)national metalbands and, in doing so, re-establishing the Amsterdam metalscene. It was originally organized in The Sugarfactory, featuring Dutch bands like Cilice, The New Dominion, Red Eyes, Illucinoma and others. The May 2018 edition line-up is Fleshgod Apocalypse, Obscura, The Charm The Fury, Hideous Divinity, For I Am King, Onegodless.

== Past billings ==
=== October 2016 ===
Textures (NL), Aborted (BE) performing Retrogore in its entirety, Humanity’s Last Breath (SE) Dutch debut, Exivious (NL) global exclusive, Seita (NL) and Hibakusha (NL).

=== April 2016 ===
Decapitated (POL), Carach Angren (NL), God Dethroned (NL), Heart Of A Coward (UK), Herder (NL) and Veil of Delusions (NL).

=== October 2015 ===
Aborted (BE), Seita (NL), Cultura Tres (VEN), Ethereal (NL), Red Eyes (NL) and Hillsphere (NL).
