= Planisphere (disambiguation) =

Planisphere or planisphaerium may refer to:

== Astronomy and cartography ==
- Planisphere or Planisphaerium, a 2nd-century AD book by Claudius Ptolemy about mapping the celestial sphere onto a flat plane using the stereographic projection to make a star chart
- Planispheric astrolabe, a device consisting of a planisphere joined to a dioptra, used for observing stars and performing astronomical calculations
- Planisphere, a cardboard or plastic adjustable star chart based on the planispheric astrolabe
- Planisphere projection, or stereographic projection, a conformal map projection which takes spherical circles to planar circles
- Planisphere, a historical name for star chart
- Planisphere, a historical name for world map (see also History of cartography)

== Media ==
- Planisphère, a 2008 tetrology of songs by French electronic music group Justice
- Planisphærium (album), the 2003 debut album by death metal group Wormed
- Planisphere (poetry collection), a 2009 poetry collection by the American writer John Ashbery
