= Asylum Cave =

Studio album by Benighted
- Released: March 21, 2011; March 29, 2011 (United States)
- Genres: Brutal death metal, deathgrind
- Length: 45:03
- Label: Season of Mist

Benighted chronology
Icon (2007)	Asylum Cave (2011)	Carnivore Sublime (2014)

Professional ratings
Review scores
Source	Rating
Blabbermouth.net	8/10 stars

Asylum Cave is the sixth studio album by French death metal band Benighted. The album was recorded at Kohlekeller Studios in Darmstadt, Hessen, Germany and released on March 21, 2011.

== Track listing ==
No.	Title	Length
1.	"Asylum Cave"	3:30
2.	"Let the Blood Spill Between My Broken Teeth"	3:51
3.	"Prey"	3:53
4.	"Hostile"	2:39
5.	"Fritzl"	4:36
6.	"Unborn Infected Children"	4:07
7.	"The Cold Remains"	3:58
8.	"A Quiet Day"	3:39
9.	"Shadows Descend"	2:57
10.	"Swallow"	3:00
11.	"Lethal Merycism"	3:34
12.	"Drowning"	5:19
Total length:		45:03

== Personnel ==
Benighted

- Julien Truchan – vocals
- Olivier Gabriel – guitar
- Liem N'Guyen – guitar
- Eric Lombard – bass
- Kevin Foley – drums

Guest musicians

- Sven de Caluwé (Aborted) – vocals on "Unborn Infected Children"
- Mike Majewski (Devourment) – vocals on "A Quiet Day"
- Asphodel (Pin-Up Went Down) – vocals on "Fritzl"
- Dirk Bretträger – scratching on "Drowning"
- Freddy Kroeger – guitar Solo on "Lethal Merycism"
