= Phlegeton =

Spanish musician

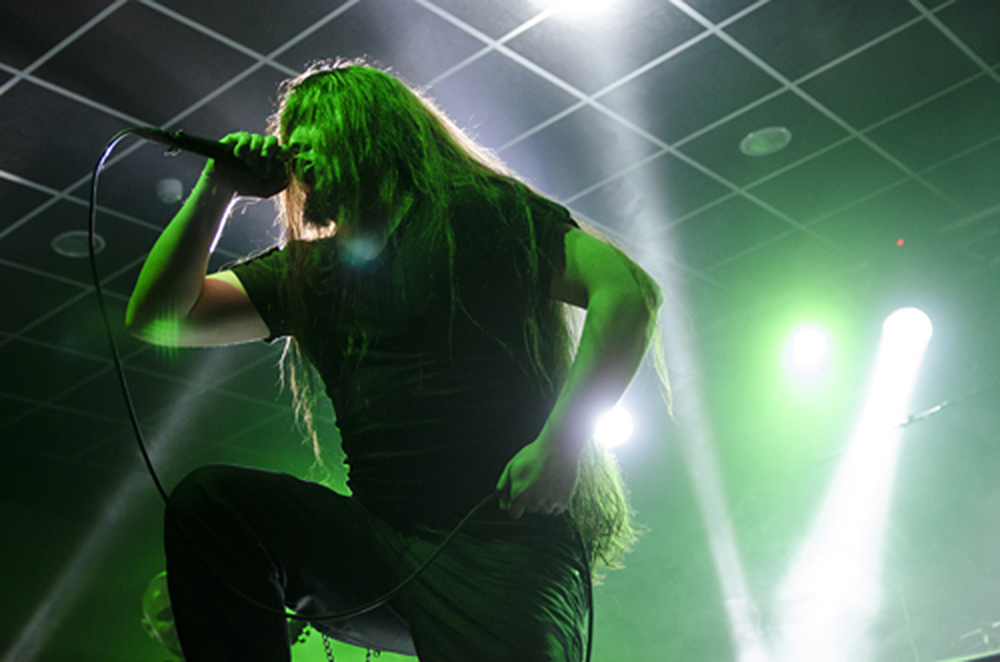
- Phlegeton performing in 2013

Background information
- Born: Jose Luis Rey Sanchez; 3 December 1979 (age 46); Madrid, Spain
- Genres: Brutal death metal; technical death metal; black metal; grindcore; avant-garde metal
- Occupations: Musician; songwriter; visual artist; producer
- Instruments: Vocals; drums; programming
- Years active: 1998–present
- Labels: Season of Mist; Xtreem; Willowtip; Metal Inquisition; Macabre Mementos; Ordo Decimus Peccatum
- Website: phlegeton-art.com

Jose Luis "J.L." Rey Sanchez (born 1979), better known by his stage name Phlegeton, is a Spanish death metal musician, audio producer, and visual artist based in Madrid. He is best known as the vocalist for the technical brutal death metal band Wormed, which was founded in 1998 and he has been a member of since.

Over the years, Phlegeton created various bands and musical projects. He is best known for his work as vocalist in the band Wormed, and for his artistic work on album covers, especially death metal albums.

His pseudonym is based on the Greek mythology, the river Phlegethon (Φλεγέθων, English translation: "flaming"), one of the five rivers in the infernal regions of the underworld.

== Music ==
Phlegeton has fronted a number of bands as a vocalist and drummer, including Wormed, Human Mincer, Wrong, Banished from Inferno, and Unsane Crisis. He has also been a member of Godüs, The YTriple Corporation, Garth Arum (live), Nüll, and Infernal. Overall, he has released 10 studio albums.

Phlegeton has a diverse vocal register, encompassing many extreme styles, from deep gutturals to clean and raspy high-pitched vocals.

He is known for his lyrics style in the band Wormed. He does not use the common gore aesthetics but rather tell stories of science fiction, quantum physics and space exploration.

== Artwork ==
In 2005, Phlegeton launched his own design studio, Phlegeton Art Studio. He creates record covers for international death metal bands, centered around horror and science fiction genres.

== Discography (as musician) ==
Wormed (vocals)

- Floating Cadaver in the Monochrome MLP (1999)
- Voxel Mitosis SINGLE (2001)
- Planisphærium LP (2003)
- Quasineutrality EP (Vocals, drums) (2010)
- Exodromos LP (2013)
- Krighsu LP (2016)
- Metaportal EP (2019)

Altarage (drums)

- Endinghent LP (2017)
- The Approaching Roar LP (2019)
- Succumb LP (2021)
- Sol Corrupto LP (2022)
- Cataract EP (2023)
- Worst Case Scenario LP 2023

Lifelost (all instruments and vocals)

- Dialogues from Beyond LP (2018)
- Punitive Damnation LP (2021)

Utsik (all instruments and vocals)

- El Camino del Miedo EP (2020)

Human Mincer (vocals)

- Degradation Paradox LP (2008)

Unsane Crisis (drums, vocals)

- Unsane Crisis / Ekkaia SPLIT (2001)
- Unsane Crisis / Hashassin SPLIT (2003)

Wrong (vocals, drums)

- Memories of Sorrow LP (2013)
- Pessimistic Outcomes LP (2014)

Godüs (vocals, drums)

- Demo 2003 (2003)
- Hell Fuck Demon Sound LP (2004)
- Punishment Is Necessary EP (2005)
- Phantomgrave: I Am the Catacombs LP (2007)

Infernal (drums)

- The Reapers of God / Exelsus Diaboli SPLIT (2004)
- A Tragedy Called Existence LP (2004)

Nüll (drums)

- Turbosuizide EP (2000)

The YTriple Corporation (drums)

- The Sentinel's Eyes: A Flashforward EP (2011)
- Medusa Megalopolis LP (2013)

PHLGZ (electronic)

- phlgz EP (2009)
- p-gram-engaged-ro SINGLE (2013)
- xtr0p1an EP (2017)
- Logy EP (2020)
- NEBVLAE EP (2020)
- VARØQ EP (2021)

== Guest appearances (as vocalist) ==
- Imperial Triumphant – Alphaville Vocals (2020) (track 8. Experiment (Voivod))
- Aborted – The Necrotic Manifesto Vocals (2014) (track 11)
- Hybrid – The 8th Plague (2008) Vocals (additional)
- Awaiting the Autopsy – Couldn't Tell the Bodies Apart (2009) (track 3)

== List of album covers created ==
- ADE – Spartacus (Ita)
- Atman – No Recordáren a la Mort (Spa)
- Atman – L’ Assassi de Venus (Spa)
- Avulsed – Gorespattered Suicide (Spa)
- Avulsed – Reanimations (Spa)
- Aura Noctis – Itineris I (Spa)
- Aura Noctis – Vitae Proelium (Spa)
- Benighted – Icon (Fra)
- Caberman – Castle Dangerous (UK)
- Cerebric Turmoil – Neural Net Meltdown (Ger)
- Coffins – Sacrifice to Evil Spirit (Jap)
- Cuernos de Chivo – Deshumanización (Spa)
- Decimation – Entering the Celestial Ruins (Tur)
- Delirium – Inside the Abattoir (USA)
- Deteriorot – The Faithless (USA)
- Disgorge – Gore Blessed to the Worms (Mex)
- Disgraseed – Flesh Market (Fra)
- Disseverment – Disseverment (USA)
- Doppler – Apophenia: Type I Error (Spa)
- Dying – Born from Impurity (Spa)
- Embryonic Devourment – Beheaded by Volition (USA)
- Excruciate – Depths of Impurity (Au)
- Execration – A Feast for the Wretched (USA)
- Female Nose Breaker – Catalogue of Cruelty (Swi)
- Frequency – The Flow (Spa)
- Frozen Ocean – The Dyson Swarm (Rus)
- G-noma – Origen (Spa)
- Genotype – Design Intent (USA)
- Gloria Morti – Eryx (Fin)
- Gloria Morti – Anthems of Annihilation (Fin)
- Godüs – Phantomgrave: I Am the Catacombs (Spa)
- Golgotha – New Life (Spa)
- Gorevent – Worship Paganism (Jap)
- Human Mincer – Degradation Paradox (Spa)
- Hydra Kyll – Timelines (USA)
- Impure – Hemicorporectomy (Spa)
- Infected Chaos – The Wake of Ares (Aut)
- Infernal – A Tragedy Called Existence (Col)
- Inhuman – Course of Human Destruction (CR)
- Inhuman – Conquerors of the New World (CR)
- Insidious Torture – Lust and Decay (Au)
- Katalepsy – Musick Brings Injuries (Rus)
- Kronos – The Hellenic Terror (Fra)
- Manic Demise – The Bitter Blood of Brutality (USA)
- Mortician – Tribute to Mortician (USA)
- Mortify – Preliminary Hearing (Can)
- Moñigo – Coprometidos con la Causa (Spa)
- Necrotic Disgorgement – Documentaries of Dementia (USA)
- Nemecic – The First Morning and the Last Day (Fin)
- Nüll – Turbosuizide (Spa)
- Over Your Threshold – Facticity (Ger)
- Revenant – The Burning Ground (USA)
- Rex Devs – Ser de seres (Spa)
- Rex Devs – Nosce te Ipsum (Spa)
- The Sickening – Death Devastation Decay (Nor)
- The Unborn Dead – Primitive Origins (Can)
- The YTriple Corporation – Medusa Megalopolis (Spa)
- The YTriple Corporation – The Sentinel's Eyes (Spa)
- Time of Hate – Sweating Hate (Spa)
- Tools of Torture – Faith-Purification-Execution (Ita)
- Truculency – Eviscerate the Paraplegic (USA)
- Unsane Crisis – Split with Ekkaia (Spa)
- Unsane Crisis – Split with Hashassin (Spa)
- Unfathomable Ruination – Misshapen Congenital Entropy (UK)
- Unfathomable Ruination – Unfathomable Ruination (UK)
- Umbah – Enter the Dagobah Core (UK)
- Unwom – Phase 1: Inner Earth Dimension (Spa)
- Vidres a la Sang – Vidres a la Sang (Spa)
- Vidres a la Sang – Endins (Spa)
- Whoretopsy – They Did Unspeakable Things (Au)
- Whoretopsy – Isn't She Lovely (Au)
- Whoretopsy – Never Tear Us Apart (Au)
- Wormed – Floating Cadaver in the Monochrome (Spa)
- Wormed – Voxel Mitosis (Spa)
- Wormed – Planisphærium (Spa)
- Wormed – Quasineutrality (Spa)
- Wormed – Exodromos (Spa)
- Wrong – Memories of Sorrow (Spa)
- Wrong – Pessimistic Outcomes (Spa)
