= Icon (Benighted album) =

Studio album by Benighted
- Released: October 29, 2007
- Genres: Brutal death metal, deathgrind
- Length: 39:07
- Label: Osmose

Benighted chronology
Identisick (2006)	Icon (2007)	Asylum Cave (2011)

Icon is the fifth studio album by French death metal band Benighted. The album was released in October 29, 2007. The CD was recorded, mixed and mastered at Kohlekeller Studios, Seeheim-Jugenheim, Germany. The artwork was created by Phlegeton.

== Track listing ==
No.	Title	Length
1.	"Complete Exsanguination"	0:26
2.	"Slut"	3:00
3.	"Grind Wit"	3:39
4.	"Saw It All"	3:54
5.	"Forsaken"	3:30
6.	"Smile then Bleed"	3:38
7.	"Pledge of Retaliation"	3:03
8.	"Icon"	4:18
9.	"Human Circles"	3:49
10.	"Invoxhate"	3:28
11.	"The Underneath"	3:31
12.	"Blindfolded Centuries"	3:21
Total length:		39:07

== Personnel ==
Benighted

- Julien Truchan – vocals
- Olivier Gabriel – guitar
- Liem N'Guyen – guitar
- Eric Lombard – bass
- Kevin Foley – drums

Guest musicians

- Karsten "Jagger" Jäger – vocals on "Human Circles"

Production

- Recorded, mixed and mastered at Kohlekeller Studios, Seeheim-Jugenheim, Germany
