= The Purity of Perversion =

Studio album by Aborted
- Released: May 1999
- Recorded: February 1999
- Genre: Brutal death metal
- Length: 31:27
- Label: Uxicon

Aborted chronology
The Purity of Perversion (1999)	Engineering the Dead (2001)

The Purity of Perversion is the debut studio album by Belgian death metal band Aborted, released in 1999.

== Track listing ==
No.	Title	Length
1.	"Intro"	0:57
2.	"Act of Supremacy"	2:43
3.	"The Lament Configuration"	4:49
4.	"The Sanctification of Fornication"	3:22
5.	"Organic Puzzle"	3:19
6.	"Necro-Eroticism"	3:58
7.	"Highway 1-35"	3:54
8.	"Gurgling Rotten Feces"	3:43
9.	"Wrenched Carnal Ornaments"	4:42
Total length:		31:27

== Personnel ==
- Sven "Svencho" de Caluwé – vocals
- Christophe "Herre" Herreman – guitars
- Niek Verstraete – guitars
- Koen Verstraete – bass
- Frank Rosseau – drums
