= Necrobreed =

Studio album by Benighted
- Released: February 17, 2017
- Genre: Deathgrind
- Length: 38:28
- Label: Season of Mist

Benighted chronology
Carnivore Sublime (2014)	Necrobreed (2017)	Obscene Repressed (2020)

Professional ratings
Review scores
Source	Rating
Metal Injection	7.5/10
Sputnik Music	4/5

Necrobreed is the eighth studio album by French death metal band Benighted. It was released by Season of Mist on February 17, 2017.

== Track listing ==
No.	Title	Length
1.	"Hush Little Baby"	1:08
2.	"Reptilian"	3:16
3.	"Psychosilencer"	3:31
4.	"Forgive Me Father"	4:16
5.	"Leatherface"	3:23
6.	"Der Doppelganger"	3:48
7.	"Necrobreed"	1:28
8.	"Monsters Make Monsters"	3:35
9.	"Cum with Disgust"	3:09
10.	"Versipellis"	2:49
11.	"Reeks of Darkened Zoopsia"	3:15
12.	"Mass Grave"	4:50
Total length:		38:28

Deluxe Edition bonus tracks
No.	Title	Length
13.	"Biotech Is Godzilla"	1:52
14.	"Christraping Black Metal"	3:06
Total length:		43:26

== Personnel ==
- Julien Truchan – vocals
- Olivier Gabriel – guitar
- Emmanuel Dalle – guitar
- Pierre Arnoux – bass
- Romain Goulon – drums

=== Guest musicians ===
- Arnaud "Arno" Dhénain (Black Bomb A) – vocals (track 9)
- Audrélie “Asphodel” Raidron (öOoOoOoOoOo) – vocals (track 1)
- Trevor Strnad (The Black Dahlia Murder) – vocals (track 4)
