= Carnivore Sublime =

Studio album by Benighted
- Released: February 14, 2014
- Genre: Deathgrind
- Length: 37:40
- Label: Season of Mist

Benighted chronology
Asylum Cave (2011)	Carnivore Sublime (2014)	Necrobreed (2017)

Professional ratings
Review scores
Source	Rating
Angry Metal Guy	3.5/5
Lambgoat	7/10
MetalSucks	2/5
Sputnikmusic	2.5/5

Carnivore Sublime is the seventh studio album by French death metal band Benighted. It was released by Season of Mist on February 14, 2014.

== Track listing ==
No.	Title	Length
1.	"X2Y"	1:29
2.	"Noise"	3:08
3.	"Experience Your Flesh"	3:05
4.	"Slaughter / Suicide"	4:38
5.	"Spit"	3:25
6.	"Defiled Purity"	4:50
7.	"Jekyll"	2:06
8.	"Collection of Dead Portraits"	3:14
9.	"Carnivore Sublime"	4:25
10.	"Les morsures du Cerbère"	3:53
11.	"June and the Laconic Solstice"	3:27
Total length:		37:40

== Personnel ==
- Julien Truchan – vocals
- Olivier Gabriel – guitar
- Adrien Guérin – guitar
- Eric Lombard – bass
- Kevin Foley – drums

=== Guest musicians ===
- Michael Kern (Carnal Decay) – vocals (track 11)
- Niklas Kvarforth (Shining) – vocals (track 5)
