= TerrorVision (album) =

2018 album by Aborted

Studio album by Aborted
- Released: September 21, 2018
- Recorded: March – April 2018
- Studio: Kohlekeller Studios (Seeheim-Jugenheim, Germany); MBDL Productions
- Genre: Death metal; grindcore
- Length: 44:59
- Label: Century Media
- Producer: Kristian "Kohle" Kohlmannslehner; Aborted

Aborted chronology
Retrogore (2016)	TerrorVision (2018)	ManiaCult (2021)

Singles from TerrorVision
- 1. "Squalor Opera" Released: July 6, 2018; 2. "TerrorVision" Released: August 3, 2018; 3. "Vespertine Decay" Released: September 6, 2018

TerrorVision is the tenth studio album by Belgian death metal band Aborted, released on September 21, 2018, via Century Media Records. It is the first album to feature bassist Stefano Franceschini, and the last album with guitarist Mendel Bij De Leij.

Professional ratings
Review scores
Source	Rating
Distorted Sound	9/10
Exclaim!	7/10
Louder Sound	3.5/5 stars
Metal Injection	7.5/10
MetalSucks	3.5/5

== Background and recording ==
On February 21, 2018, the band finished the writing process for the album. The album was recorded at Kohlekeller Studios and produced by Kristian "Kohle" Kohlmannslehner, who previously worked with the band's Termination Redux EP, Retrogore and Bathos EP. The recording sessions had officially concluded on April 11, 2018.

The band commented on the recording process of the new album:

This is actually the first record we were able to do full pre-productions for and had Kohle involved in with since the beginning, and let me tell you, the result is there. We all feel very proud and strongly about how this beast is shaping. Get ready for the most ambitious, varied and brutal Aborted record so far. Kohle has been pushing us beyond the limit of what we have ever done and stuff is sounding massive; always a pleasure to have him involved.

Vocalist Sven de Caluwé elaborated on topics of the new album:

The album and song talk about a lot of things that have been happening in the last couple of years where the public opinion is clearly being molded and manipulated, there have been studies in communication showing that 55% of communication is non-verbal impact, 38% is verbal communication and the actual message is only important for about 7% of it. I know retarded figures that don't mean much by themselves if not telling us that people don't give a fuck about what you're selling, as long as you package it right and the media/politicians know this all too well. The rise of ISIS has a lot to thank to the media as well, bigotry, racism all tools used by media to remove the eye on the actual problems for the human race as a whole and our planet.

== Release ==
On March 27, 2018, the band announced that their new album will be titled TerrorVision and would be released on September 21, 2018, via Century Media. On June 29, 2018, the band revealed details, tracklist and cover art for TerrorVision. The first single of the album "Squalor Opera" was digitally released on July 6, 2018, accompanying a music video. A lyric video for the title track "TerrorVision" was available for streaming on August 3, 2018. The third song "Vespertine Decay" was also available for streaming on September 6, 2018.

== Track listing ==
All tracks are written by Aborted.

No.	Title	Length
1.	"Lasciate ogne speranza" (instrumental)	0:54
2.	"TerrorVision" (featuring Seth Siro Anton)	4:33
3.	"Farewell to the Flesh"	4:41
4.	"Vespertine Decay"	6:00
5.	"Squalor Opera"	4:01
6.	"Visceral Despondency"	3:32
7.	"Deep Red"	3:20
8.	"Exquisite Covinous Drama"	5:01
9.	"Altro Inferno"	4:49
10.	"A Whore D'oeuvre Macabre" (featuring Sebastian Grihm)	3:01
11.	"The Final Absolution" (featuring Julien Truchan)	5:07
Total length:		44:59

Bathos EP – Limited Deluxe Edition bonus tracks
No.	Title	Length
12.	"Bathos"	4:17
13.	"Fallacious Crescendo"	3:43
Total length:		52:59

== Personnel ==
Aborted

- Sven de Caluwé – vocals
- Mendel bij de Lei – guitars
- Ian Jekelis – guitars
- Stefano Franceschini – bass
- Ken Bedene – drums

Additional musician

- Seth Siro Anton (Septicflesh) – guest vocals (track 2)
- Sebastian Grihm (Cytotoxin) – guest vocals (track 10)
- Julien Truchan (Benighted) – guest vocals (track 11)
- Kristian "Kohle" Kohlmannslehner – keyboards, samples

Production

- Kristian Kohlmannslehner – production, recording, re-amping (guitars and bass), mixing, mastering
- Aborted – production
- Pär Olofsson – cover art, artwork
- Coki Greenway – artwork
- Scanline – design
- Tim Tronckoe – photography
