= The Necrotic Manifesto =

Studio album by Aborted
- Released: April 29, 2014
- Recorded: 2014
- Studio: Hansen Studios, Ribe, Denmark
- Genre: Death metal, grindcore
- Length: 42:46
- Label: Century Media
- Producer: Jacob Hansen

Aborted chronology
Global Flatline (2012)	The Necrotic Manifesto (2014)	Retrogore (2016)

Professional ratings
Review scores
Source	Rating
About	4.5/5 stars
All About The Rock	9/10 stars
AllMusic	3.5/5 stars

The Necrotic Manifesto is the eighth album by Belgian death metal band Aborted. It was released on April 29, 2014, in Europe, through Century Media Records. The album was recorded at Hansen Studios in Denmark with producer Jacob Hansen.

The first single, "Necrotic Manifesto", was released digitally on March 14, 2014. The song "Purity of Perversion" is named after the band's debut album. The album charted in the USA (Heatseeker charts spot 4), The Netherlands, Germany, Belgium and France.

== Track listing ==
All tracks are written by Aborted.

No.	Title	Length
1.	"Six Feet of Foreplay"	1:12
2.	"The Extirpation Agenda"	3:11
3.	"Necrotic Manifesto"	2:45
4.	"An Enumeration of Cadavers"	3:31
5.	"Your Entitlement Means Nothing" (feat. Vincent Bennett of The Acacia Strain)	1:44
6.	"The Davidian Deceit"	3:32
7.	"Coffin Upon Coffin"	3:28
8.	"Chronicles of Detruncation"	3:08
9.	"Sade & Libertine Lunacy"	3:42
10.	"Die Verzweiflung"	2:29
11.	"Excremental Veracity" (feat. Plegethon of Wormed)	2:39
12.	"Purity of Perversion"	2:45
13.	"Of Dead Skin & Decay"	3:09
14.	"Cenobites"	5:31

iTunes bonus track
No.	Title	Length
15.	"Arise" (Sepultura cover; from the Scriptures of the Dead EP)	3:22

Limited Edition Bonus Tracks
No.	Title	Length
15.	"Saprophytes"	3:27
16.	"Concubine" (Converge cover)	1:29
17.	"Funeral Inception" (Suffocation cover)	4:00

== Personnel ==
=== Aborted ===
- Sven de Caluwé - vocals
- Mendel bij de Leij - guitars
- Danny Tunker - guitars
- JB van der Wal - bass
- Ken Bedene - drums

=== Guest musicians ===
- Vincent Bennett - vocals
- Phlegeton - vocals

=== Production ===
- Jacob Hansen – production, engineering, mixing, mastering
- Alex Karlinsky – sound design
- Pär Olofsson – artwork
