= Retrogore =

Studio album by Aborted
- Released: April 22, 2016
- Recorded: December 2015 at Kohlekeller Studios Germany
- Genre: Death metal
- Length: 43:16
- Label: Century Media
- Producer: Kristian "Kohle" Kohlmannslehner

Aborted chronology
The Necrotic Manifesto (2014)	Retrogore (2016)	TerrorVision (2018)

Professional ratings
Review scores
Source	Rating
Distorted Sound	9/10
Exclaim!	9/10
Metal Blast	4.5/5 stars
Metal Injection	9/10
MetalSucks	4.5/5 stars

Retrogore is the ninth studio album by Belgium-based death metal band, Aborted. It was released on 22 April 2016 worldwide, through Century Media Records. It is the first Aborted album with guitarist Ian Jekelis, and the last with bassist JB van der Wal.

The first song, "Retrogore", was streamed on 8 March 2016 via YouTube. The song "Termination Redux" previously made an appearance on the band's 2016 EP Termination Redux.

== Critical reception ==
Retrogore received overwhelmingly positive critical reception upon release, with many reviewers praising it to be the best record the band has released to this date.

== Chart performance ==
The album peaked at No. 59 on the Belgian albums chart, making it Aborted's best charting album until the release of TerrorVision. The album remained in the Belgian charts for a total of four weeks.

== Track listing ==
No.	Title	Length
1.	"Dellamorte Dellamore"	0:51
2.	"Retrogore"	4:17
3.	"Cadaverous Banquet" (featuring Julien Truchan)	4:12
4.	"Whoremageddon"	3:29
5.	"Termination Redux"	3:27
6.	"Bit by Bit"	4:03
7.	"Divine Impediment" (featuring Travis Ryan of Cattle Decapitation)	4:18
8.	"Coven of Ignorance" (featuring David Davidson)	3:42
9.	"The Mephitic Conundrum" (featuring Jason Keyser)	3:18
10.	"Forged for Decrepitude"	2:41
11.	"From Beyond (The Grave)"	4:22
12.	"In Avernus"	4:36
13.	"Slasher Hysteria (bonus track)"	3:27
14.	"Les Miserables (bonus track)"	3:57
Total length:		43:16

== Personnel ==
=== Aborted ===
- Sven de Caluwé – vocals
- Mendel bij de Leij – guitars
- Ian Jekelis – guitars
- JB van der Wal – bass
- Ken Bedene – drums

=== Guest musicians ===
- David Davidson – vocals (track 8)
- Julien Truchan – vocals (track 3)
- Jason Keyser – vocals (track 9)
- Travis Ryan – vocals (track 7)
- Alex Karlinsky – samples, keyboards (all tracks)

=== Production ===
- Kristian "Kohle" Kohlmannslehner – producer, engineer, mixing, mastering
- Christopher Lovell – artwork

== Charts ==
Chart (2016)	Peak position
Australian Albums (ARIA)	88
Belgian Albums (Ultratop Flanders)	59
Belgian Albums (Ultratop Wallonia)	90
French Albums (SNEP)	184
German Albums (Offizielle Top 100)	64
Swiss Albums (Schweizer Hitparade)	100
