= Global Flatline =

Studio album by Aborted
- Released: January 20, 2012
- Recorded: June 20 – July 9, 2011 at Hansen Studios, Ribe, Denmark
- Genre: Death metal, grindcore
- Length: 43:39
- Label: Century Media
- Producer: Jacob Hansen

Aborted chronology
Coronary Reconstruction (2010)	Global Flatline (2012)	The Necrotic Manifesto (2014)

Professional ratings
Review scores
Source	Rating
Allmusic	3.5/5 stars

Global Flatline is the seventh album by death metal band Aborted. It was released on January 20, 2012, in Europe, through Century Media Records. The album was recorded at Hansen Studios in Denmark with producer Jacob Hansen, and is the first to feature ex-Abigail Williams members Ken Bedene on drums and Mike Wilson on guitar, as well as bassist J.B. Van Der Wal.

The songs "Coronary Reconstruction", "From a Tepid Whiff" and "Grime" all previously appeared on the band's 2010 EP Coronary Reconstruction. The first single, "Global Flatline", was released digitally on October 25, 2011.

== Track listing ==
All tracks are written by Aborted, except where noted.

No.	Title	Length
1.	"Omega Mortis"	0:59
2.	"Global Flatline"	3:12
3.	"Источник Болезни (The Origin of Disease)"	3:04
4.	"Coronary Reconstruction"	4:28
5.	"Fecal Forgery"	2:44
6.	"Of Scabs and Boils"	2:53
7.	"Vermicular, Obscene, Obese"	2:51
8.	"Expurgation Euphoria"	3:43
9.	"From a Tepid Whiff" (Thomas Haywood, Cole Martinez)	3:03
10.	"The Kallinger Theory"	3:43
11.	"Our Father, Who Art of Feces"	2:43
12.	"Grime"	3:47
13.	"Endstille"	6:29

Digipack bonus tracks
No.	Title	Length
14.	"Eructations of Carnal Artistry"	3:27
15.	"Nailed Through Her Cunt"	4:12

== Personnel ==
=== Aborted ===
- Sven "Svencho" de Caluwé – vocals
- Eran Segal – guitars
- Mike Wilson – guitars
- J.B. Van Der Wal – bass
- Ken Bedene – drums

=== Guest musicians ===
- Jason Netherton – vocals (track 12)
- Keijo Niinimaa – vocals (track 11)
- Trevor Strnad – vocals (track 7)
- Julien Truchan – vocals (tracks 3 and 14)

=== Production ===
- Jacob Hansen – production, engineering, mixing, mastering
- Alex Karlinsky – sound design
- Justin Osbourn – artwork
