= The Haematobic EP =

EP by Aborted
- Released: May 24, 2004
- Genre: Death metal
- Length: 24:58
- Label: Listenable, The End

Aborted chronology
Goremageddon: The Saw and the Carnage Done (2003)	The Haematobic EP (2004)	The Archaic Abattoir (2005)

The Haematobic EP is an EP by Aborted released on May 24, 2004.

The intent of the EP was to serve something of a preview for the group’s then-upcoming fourth album The Archaic Abattoir. Two songs from this EP were reworked and re-recorded for that album.

== Track listing ==
No.	Title	Length
1.	"Gestated Rabidity"	4:13
2.	"Drowned" (Entombed Cover)	3:46
3.	"Voracious Haemoglobinic Syndrome"	4:06
4.	"The Sanctification of Refornication"	3:44
5.	"Parasitic Flesh Resection" (live)	2:05
6.	"The Holocaust Incarnate" (live)	7:04

Videos

No.	Title	Length
1.	"Meticulous Invagination" (video)
2.	"The Saw & the Carnage Done" (video)
3.	"Parasitic Flesh Resection" (live video)
4.	"The Holocaust Incarnate" (live video)
5.	"Eructations of Carnal Artistry" (live video)

== Personnel ==
- Sven "Svencho" de Caluwé – vocals
- Bart Vergaert – guitars
- Thijs De Cloedt – guitars
- Frederik Vanmassenhove – bass
- Dirk Verbeuren – drums
