= Strychnine.213 =

Studio album by Aborted
- Released: June 20, 2008
- Recorded: December 2007
- Genre: Death metal
- Length: 41:05
- Label: Century Media
- Producer: Gail Liebling

Aborted chronology
Slaughter & Apparatus: A Methodical Overture (2007)	Strychnine.213 (2008)	Coronary Reconstruction (2010)

Professional ratings
Review scores
Source	Rating
About.com	4/5 stars
Allmusic	3.5/5 stars
Blabbermouth	8/10 stars

Strychnine.213 is the sixth album by Belgian death metal band Aborted. It was released on June 20, 2008, through Century Media Records. The sample used in the song "A Murmur in Decrepit Wits" is Aborted's take on a 1980s interview with Charles Manson.

== Track listing ==
All tracks are written by Sven de Caluwé, except where noted

No.	Title	Length
1.	"Carrion"	1:46
2.	"Ophiolatry on a Hemocite Platter"	4:51
3.	"I35" (de Caluwé, Aborted)	3:45
4.	"Pestiferous Subterfuge"	4:24
5.	"The Chyme Congeries"	3:45
6.	"A Murmur in Decrepit Wits"	4:43
7.	"Enterrement of an Idol" (de Caluwé, Aborted)	3:24
8.	"Hereditary Bane"	2:49
9.	"Avarice of Vilification"	3:34
10.	"The Obfuscate"	4:09
11.	"Slaughtered" (Pantera cover)	3:55
Total length:		41:05

== Personnel ==
=== Aborted ===
- Sven "Svencho" de Caluwé – vocals
- Sebastian Tuvi – guitar, backing vocals
- Peter Goemaere – guitar
- Dan Wilding – drums
- Sven Janssens – bass

=== Production ===
- Alan Douches – mastering
- Gail Liebling – producer, engineer
- Eric Rachel – mixing
