= The Auricular Chronicles =

Video by Aborted
- Released: October 30, 2006
- Recorded: May 28, 2006; Paris, France
- Genre: Death metal
- Label: Listenable Records

Aborted chronology
The Archaic Abattoir (2005)	The Auricular Chronicles (2006)	Slaughter & Apparatus: A Methodical Overture (2007)

The Auricular Chronicles is a live performance DVD by the Belgium-based death metal band Aborted. It contains the band's live performances including a full concert from May 2006 in Paris. It was released in October 2006 by Listenable Records.

== Background ==
The main feature of the DVD consists of the live performance recorded on May 28 at La Locomotive in Paris. Bonus footage includes the band's performances at the Wacken Open Air 2006; Domination Tour 2006, Rome; North American Tour 2005, Montreal and music videos for the songs "Dead Wreckoning", "Meticulous Invagination" and "A Cold Logistic Slaughter".

The DVD was released by Metal Mind Productions on October 30, 2006.

== Track listing ==
Live At Locomotive, Paris

1. Dead Wreckoning
2. Meticulous Invagination
3. Gestated Rabidity
4. The Holocaust Incarnate
5. The Inertia
6. Interlude
7. The Saw and the Carnage Done
8. Sanguine Verses (...Of Extirpation)
9. Threading the Prelude
10. The Gangrenous Epitaph
11. Hecatomb
12. The Sanctification of Fornication
13. Charted Carnal Effigy
14. A Cold Logistic Slaughter

Music videos

1. Dead Wreckoning
2. Meticulous Invagination
3. A Cold Logistic Slaughter

Wacken Open Air 2006

1. The Inertia
2. Sanguine Verses
3. Threading The Gangrenous Epitaph
4. A Cold Logistic Slaughter

Domination Tour 2006, Rome

1. Meticulous Invagination
2. Gestated Rabidity
3. The Sanctification Of Fornication

North American Tour 2005, Montreal

1. Charted Carnal Effigy
2. The Gangrenous Epitaph

+Documentary
