= Coronary Reconstruction =

EP by Aborted
- Released: March 2, 2010
- Genres: Death metal, grindcore
- Length: 22:30
- Label: Century Media

Aborted chronology
| Strychnine.213 (2008) | Coronary Reconstruction (2010) | Global Flatline (2012) |

Coronary Reconstruction is an EP by the Belgian death metal band Aborted, released on March 2, 2010 through Century Media Records. The album is the first to be recorded with the band's new 2009 line-up, and was released mainly as a digital EP, with only 1,000 physical copies made. The song "Coronary Reconstruction" contains audio samples from the film Hellbound: Hellraiser II.

Bastian of Metal.de rated the album a seven out of ten, writing that the band had "finally rediscovered their strengths".

== Track listing ==
| No. | Title | Length |
|---|---|---|
| 1. | "Coronary Reconstruction" | 4:28 |
| 2. | "From a Tepid Whiff" | 3:24 |
| 3. | "Grime" | 3:41 |
| 4. | "A Cadaverous Dissertation" | 4:24 |
| 5. | "Left Hand Path" (Entombed cover) | 6:37 |
| Total length: | | 22:30 |

== Personnel ==
- Sven "Svencho" de Caluwé – vocals
- Eran Segal – guitars
- Ken Sorceron – guitars
- Cole Martinez – bass
- Dirk Verbeuren – drums
