= Slaughter & Apparatus: A Methodical Overture =

Studio album by Aborted
- Released: February 20, 2007
- Genre: Death metal
- Length: 42:42
- Label: Century Media
- Producer: Tue Madsen

Aborted chronology
The Auricular Chronicles (2006)	Slaughter & Apparatus: A Methodical Overture (2007)	Strychnine.213 (2008)

Professional ratings
Review scores
Source	Rating
AllMusic	4.5/5 stars
Blabbermouth	7/10 stars

Slaughter & Apparatus: A Methodical Overture is the fifth album by death metal band Aborted. David Haley from Psycroptic was the featured drummer for the release.

Japanese copies contain the bonus track "Surprise! You're Dead!", which is a cover of Faith No More.

== Track listing ==
No.	Title	Length
1.	"The Chondrin Enigma"	4:20
2.	"A Methodical Overture"	3:25
3.	"Avenious"	4:41
4.	"The Spaying Séance"	4:25
5.	"And Carnage Basked in Its Ebullience"	3:10
6.	"The Foul Nucleus of Resurrection"	4:13
7.	"Archetype"	3:12
8.	"Ingenuity in Genocide"	3:42
9.	"Odious Emanation"	3:37
10.	"Prolific Murder Contrivance"	3:07
11.	"Underneath Rorulent Soil"	4:51
Total length:		42:42

== Personnel ==
=== Aborted ===
- Sven "Svencho" de Caluwé – vocals
- Sebastien "Seb Purulator" Tuvi – guitars, backing vocals
- Matty Dupont – guitars
- Peter Goemaere – bass
- David Haley – drums

=== Additional personnel ===
- Jeffrey Walker (Carcass)
- Jacob Bredahl (Hatesphere)
- Henrik Jacobsen (Hatesphere)
