= The Archaic Abattoir =

Studio album by Aborted
- Released: April 17, 2005
- Genre: Death metal
- Length: 36:29
- Label: Listenable
- Producer: Tue Madsen, Aborted

Aborted chronology
The Haematobic EP (2004)	The Archaic Abattoir (2005)	The Auricular Chronicles (2006)

Professional ratings
Review scores
Source	Rating
AllMusic	4.5/5 stars
Blabbermouth	8/10 stars

The Archaic Abattoir is the fourth album by death metal group Aborted. The track "Dead Wreckoning" contains audio samples from American Psycho, and the song "Threading on Vermillion Deception" contains audio from the film Blade.

The album was re-released in 2009, with two songs from The Haematobic EP as bonus tracks.

== Track listing ==
No.	Title	Length
1.	"Dead Wreckoning"	3:41
2.	"Blood Fixing the Bled"	3:04
3.	"Gestated Rabidity"	4:04
4.	"Hecatomb"	2:50
5.	"The Gangrenous Epitaph"	3:25
6.	"The Inertia"	3:35
7.	"A Cold Logistic Slaughter"	2:13
8.	"Threading on Vermillion Deception"	5:14
9.	"Voracious Haemoglobinic Syndrome"	4:14
10.	"Descend to Extirpation"	4:06
Total length:		36:29

2009 re-release bonus tracks
No.	Title	Length
11.	"The Sanctification of Refornication"	3:44
12.	"Drowned" (Entombed cover)	3:46

== Personnel ==
=== Aborted ===
- Sven "Svencho" de Caluwé – vocals
- Bart Vergaert – guitars
- Thijs De Cloedt – guitars
- Frederik Vanmassenhove – bass
- Gilles Delecroix – drums

=== Guest musicians ===
- Michael Bogballe – vocals (1)
- Bo Summer – vocals (5, 6)
- Jacob Bredahl – vocals (8)
