= Planisphærium (album) =

Studio album by Wormed
- Released: 2003
- Recorded: November 2002 – December 2002 at VRS in Madrid, Spain
- Genre: Technical death metal
- Label: Macabre Mementos
- Producer: Samuel Ruiz and Wormed

Wormed chronology
Voxel Mitosis (2001)	Planisphærium (2003)	Exodromos (2013)

Professional ratings
Review scores
Source	Rating
Sputnikmusic	3.5/5 stars
BW&BK	9/10 stars

Planisphærium is the debut album from the technical death metal band Wormed. It was released in 2003 through the Japanese label Macabre Mementos Records.

== Track listing ==
- All music composed by J.Oliver and Andy C
- All lyrics written by Phlegeton
1. "Tunnel of Ions" – 3:29
2. "Geodesic Dome" – 3:39
3. "Voxel Mitosis" – 3:57
4. "Fragments" – 2:59
5. "Ylem" – 3:36
6. "Planisphærium" – 4:03
7. "Pulses in Rhombus Forms" – 3:01
8. "Dehydrating" – 3:09

=== 2005 Reissue ===
- The reissue includes tracks from Wormed's two previous releases, "Floating Cadaver in the Monochrome Demo" and "Voxel Mitosis Promo"
9. "Pulses in Rhombus Forms" – 3:04 (1999 Edition)
10. "Ectoplasmic Iconosphere [D.1]" – 3:58
11. "Ectoplasmic Iconosphere [D.2]" – 4:00
12. "Floating Cadaver in the Monochrome" – 3:04
13. "Geodesic Dome" – 4:25 (1999 Edition)
14. "Voxel Mitosis" – 3:56 (2001 Edition)

== Personnel ==
=== Wormed ===
- Phlegeton– vocals
- J. Oliver – guitar
- Guillemoth – bass guitar
- Andy C – drums

=== Production and other credits ===
- Produced by Samuel Ruiz and Wormed
- Mastered by Jorge Peñafiel
- Album layout, design and artwork by Phlegeton.
