= Wormed =

Spanish technical death metal band

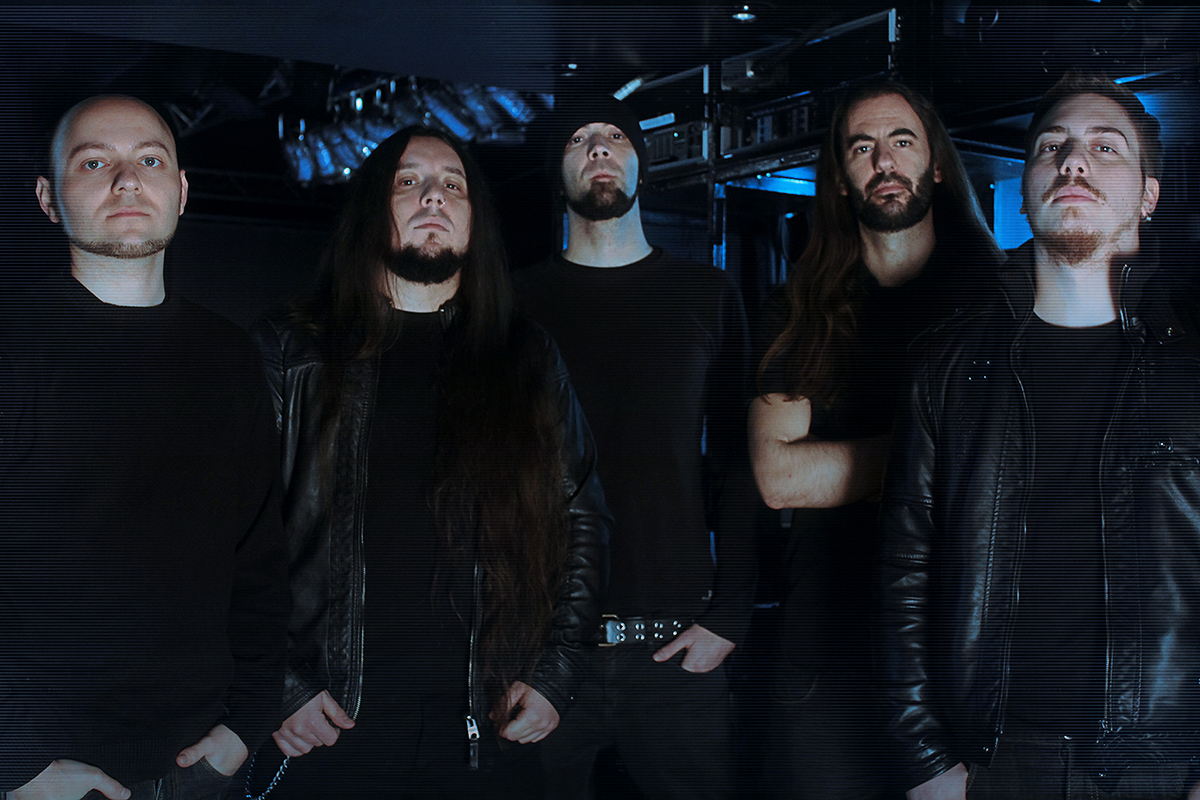
- Wormed photographed in 2014

Background information
- Origin: Madrid, Spain
- Genres: Brutal death metal, technical death metal
- Years active: 1998–present
- Labels: Season of Mist; Willowtip
- Members: J.L. "Phlegeton" Rey; Guille "Guillemoth" Garcia; Miguel "Migueloud" Ángel; Gabriel "V-Kazar" Valcázar; Daniel "D-Kazar" Valcázar
- Past members: Dani; Javier "J." Oliver; Andrés "Andy C." Cobos; Charly R. Ricardo "Riky" Mena; Guillermo "G-Calero" Calero
- Website: www.wormed.net

Wormed is a Spanish technical death metal band. The group formed in 1998 in Madrid and are known for their science fiction and outer space-influenced imagery, lyrics and sound. The band has released four full-length albums.

== History ==
Wormed formed in 1998 with J. Oliver and Dani on guitars, Guillemoth on bass, and Andy C. on drums. The band solidified their lineup later that year with Phlegeton joining on vocals. Frontman, Phlegeton played a significant role in shifting the band’s thematic focus away from gore commonly associated with brutal death metal toward concepts centered on outer space, science fiction, and surrealism. This thematic evolution contributed to the band’s reputation as a distinctive and unconventional presence within the genre.

In December 1999, Wormed recorded their first demo, Floating Cadaver in the Monochrome, with Tana from Avulsed as sound engineer. This promo gained a following, selling more than 1500 copies worldwide. In 2001, the band returned to the studio to record a promo CD, Voxel Mitosis, including only a single song due to a lack of resources. After the recording the promo CD, Dani left Wormed due to creative differences, leaving Wormed as a four-piece. The band received international recognition playing festivals and concerts worldwide.

In 2003, the band released their first full album, Planisphærium, through Japanese label Macabre Mementos Records. In December 2003, J. Oliver left the band, and Charly R., guitarist of Valcenia death metal band Wormineye, replaced him on guitar. Between 2004 and 2006, the band played metal festivals in the United States, Japan, Germany, and the Netherlands. They toured Japan with American band Goratory Japanese band Vomit Remnants. They later toured Europe with American band Malignancy and German band Despondency.

After a period of inactivity, the band started writing again with J. Oliver, with Phlegeton practicing on drums. Migueloud of Spanish death metal band Human Mincer joined the band as the second guitarist. In 2010, the band released the single "Quasineutrality" through the Spanish label Pathologically Explicit Recordings. In 2012, Planisphærium and "Quasineutrality" were re-released through North American label Willowtip Records. Ahead of returning to live performances, Ricardo "Riky" Mena from Spanish death metal band Avulsed joined Wormed on drums.

In March 2013, their second album Exodromos was released. The album was recorded at Sadman Studios in Madrid by Carlos Santos and mastered by Mika Jussila (Amorphis, Impaled Nazarene, Children of Bodom, Nightwish) at Finnvox Studios in Helsinki, Finland. Exodromos was released through Willowtip Records in the United States and Hammerheart Records in Europe. Lyrically, Exodromos is a prequel to Planisphærium; it tells the story of futuristic science concepts and chaotic visions of Krighsu, the last human left in outer space.

The band participated in Maryland Deathfest in May 2015.

Wormed released a statement on 13 March 2018 that their drummer Guillermo Calero had died, with the cause of death not being disclosed. Calero played in Wormed from 2014 until his death and performed on their third full-length album Krighsu, released on 16 March 2016. After recruiting Gabriel Valcázaron on drums, Wormed released a new EP, Metaportal, in 2019. In 2020, Loudwire proclaimed Wormed as the "best" Spanish metal act of all time. Wormed released its fourth album Omegon on 5 July 2024.

== Band members ==
=== Current members ===
- J.L. "Phlegeton" Rey – vocals (1998–present)
- Guille "Guillemoth" Garcia – bass (1998–present)
- Miguel "Migueloud" Ángel – guitar (2008–present)
- Gabriel "V-Kazar" Valcázar – drums (2018–present)
- Daniel "D-Kazar" Valcázar – guitar (2021–present)

=== Former members ===
- Dani – guitar (1998–2001)
- Javier "J." Oliver – guitar (1998–2003, 2008–2016)
- Andrés "Andy C." Cobos – drums (1998–2007)
- Charly R. – guitar (2004–2007)
- Ricardo "Riky" Mena – drums (2008–2013)
- Guillermo "G-Calero" Calero – drums (2014–2018; died 2018)

Timeline

== Discography ==
=== Albums ===
- Planisphærium (2003)
- Exodromos (2013)
- Krighsu (2016)
- Omegon (2024)

=== Other releases ===
- Floating Cadaver in the Monochrome (demo, 1999)
- Voxel Mitosis (demo single, 2001)
- Quasineutrality (single/EP, 2010)
- Metaportal (EP, 2019)
