= Goremageddon: The Saw and the Carnage Done =

Album by Aborted

Studio album by Aborted
- Released: April 22, 2003
- Genre: Death metal; grindcore
- Length: 34:04
- Label: Listenable
- Producer: Jacob Hansen

Aborted chronology
Engineering the Dead (2001)	Goremageddon: The Saw and the Carnage Done (2003)	The Haematobic EP (2004)

Professional ratings
Review scores
Source	Rating
Allmusic	4/5 stars

Goremageddon: The Saw and the Carnage Done is the third studio album by Belgian death metal band Aborted. It was released in 2003. All but the last track feature samples of a medical and/or horror note. The album's title is a play on "The Needle and the Damage Done" by Neil Young.

The 2009 reissued versions have a bonus cover of the Carcass song "Carnal Forge".

== Track listing ==
No.	Title	Length
1.	"Meticulous Invagination"	3:02
2.	"Parasitic Flesh Resection"	2:10
3.	"The Saw and the Carnage Done"	4:51
4.	"Ornaments of Derision"	4:54
5.	"Sanguine Verses (...of Extirpation)"	2:58
6.	"Charted Carnal Effigy"	3:31
7.	"Clinical Colostomy"	3:29
8.	"Medical Deviance"	3:11
9.	"Sea of Cartilage"	3:02
10.	"Nemesis"	2:59
11.	"Carnal Forge" (Carcass cover, 2009 bonus track)	4:03
12.	"Gestated Rabidity" (2009 bonus track)	4:13
13.	"Voracious Haemoglobinic Syndrome" (2009 bonus track)	4:06
Total length:		46:26

== Personnel ==
- Sven "Svencho" de Caluwé – vocals
- Bart Vergaert – guitars
- Thijs De Cloedt – guitars
- Frederik Vanmassenhove – bass
- Dirk Verbeuren – drums
