= Engineering the Dead =

Studio album by Aborted
- Released: 2 July 2001
- Genre: Brutal death metal
- Length: 36:49
- Label: Listenable

Aborted chronology
Eructations of Carnal Artistry (2000)	Engineering the Dead (2001)	Goremageddon: The Saw and the Carnage Done (2003)

Engineering the Dead is the second album by the death metal band Aborted. It was released on 6 August 2001 and re-released in 2008.

== Track listing ==
No.	Title	Length
1.	"The Holocaust Incarnate"	4:19
2.	"Nailed Through Her Cunt"	4:19
3.	"To Roast and Grind"	4:41
4.	"Engineering the Dead"	6:07
5.	"Eructations of Carnal Artistry"	3:22
6.	"Sphinctral Enthrallment"	4:00
7.	"Skullfuck Crescendo"	4:28
8.	"Exhuming the Infested"	5:33
Total length:		36:49

2008 re-release bonus tracks

No.	Title	Length
9.	"The Holocaust Incarnate" (Live)	4:08
10.	"Genetic Murder Concept" (From Created to Kill)	5:06
11.	"Suffer the Children" (Napalm Death cover; from Created to Kill)	4:33

== Personnel ==
- Sven "Svencho" de Caluwé – vocals
- Thijs De Cloedt – guitars
- Niek Verstraete – guitars
- Koen Verstraete – bass
- Frank Rousseau – drums
