= Benighted =

French deathgrind band

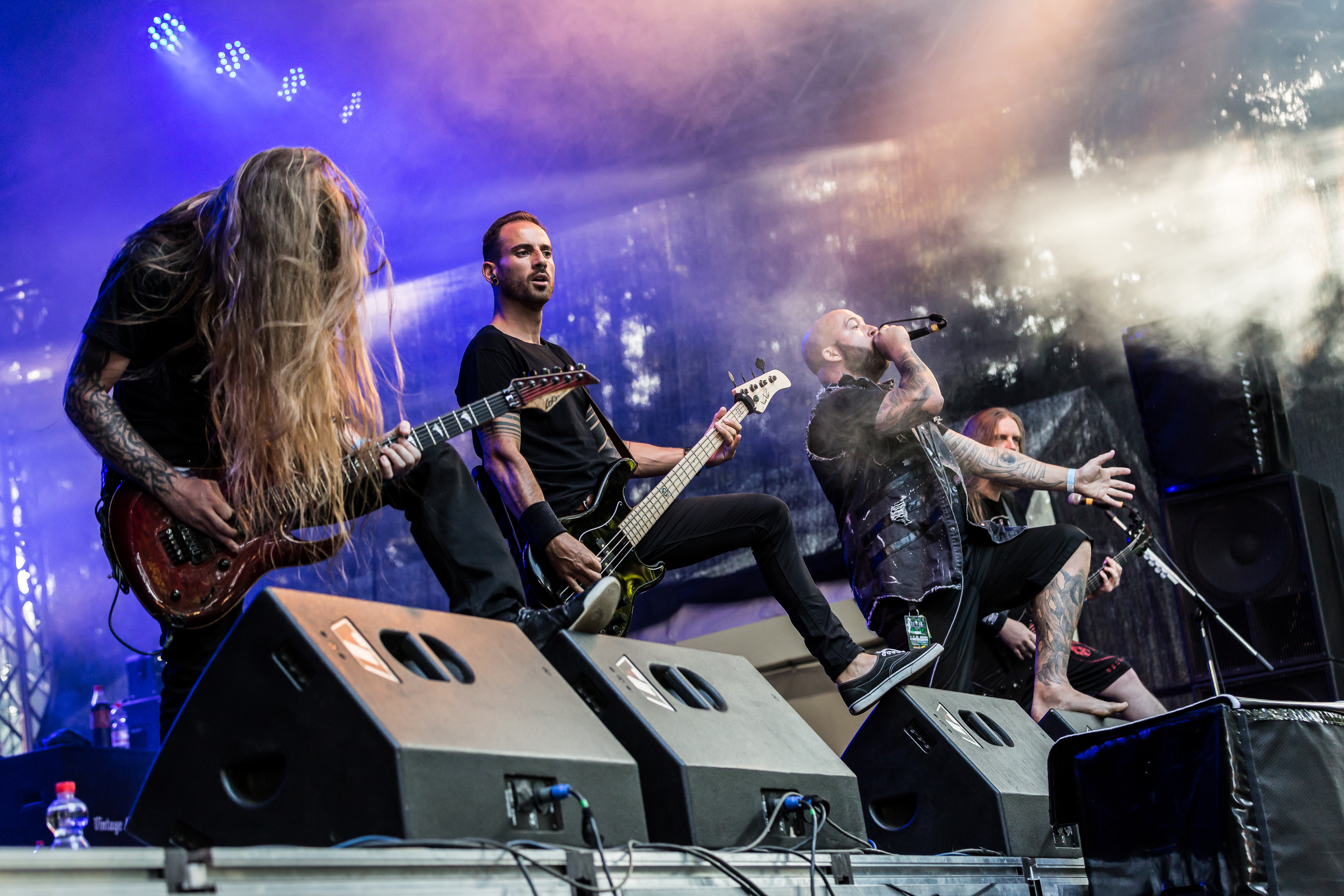
- Benighted in 2017

Background information
- Origin: Saint-Étienne, France
- Genres: Brutal death metal, deathgrind, blackened death metal (early)
- Years active: 1998–present
- Labels: Season of Mist, Osmose, Adipocère
- Members: Julien Truchan; Emmanuel Dalle; Pierre Arnoux; Matthias Biechler
- Past members: Romain Goulon; Christophe Charretier; Fred Fayolle; Liem N'Guyen; Eric Lombard; Rémi Aubrespin; Adrien Guerin; Alexis Liu; Kevin Foley; Olivier Gabriel; Fabien Desgardins; Kevin Paradis

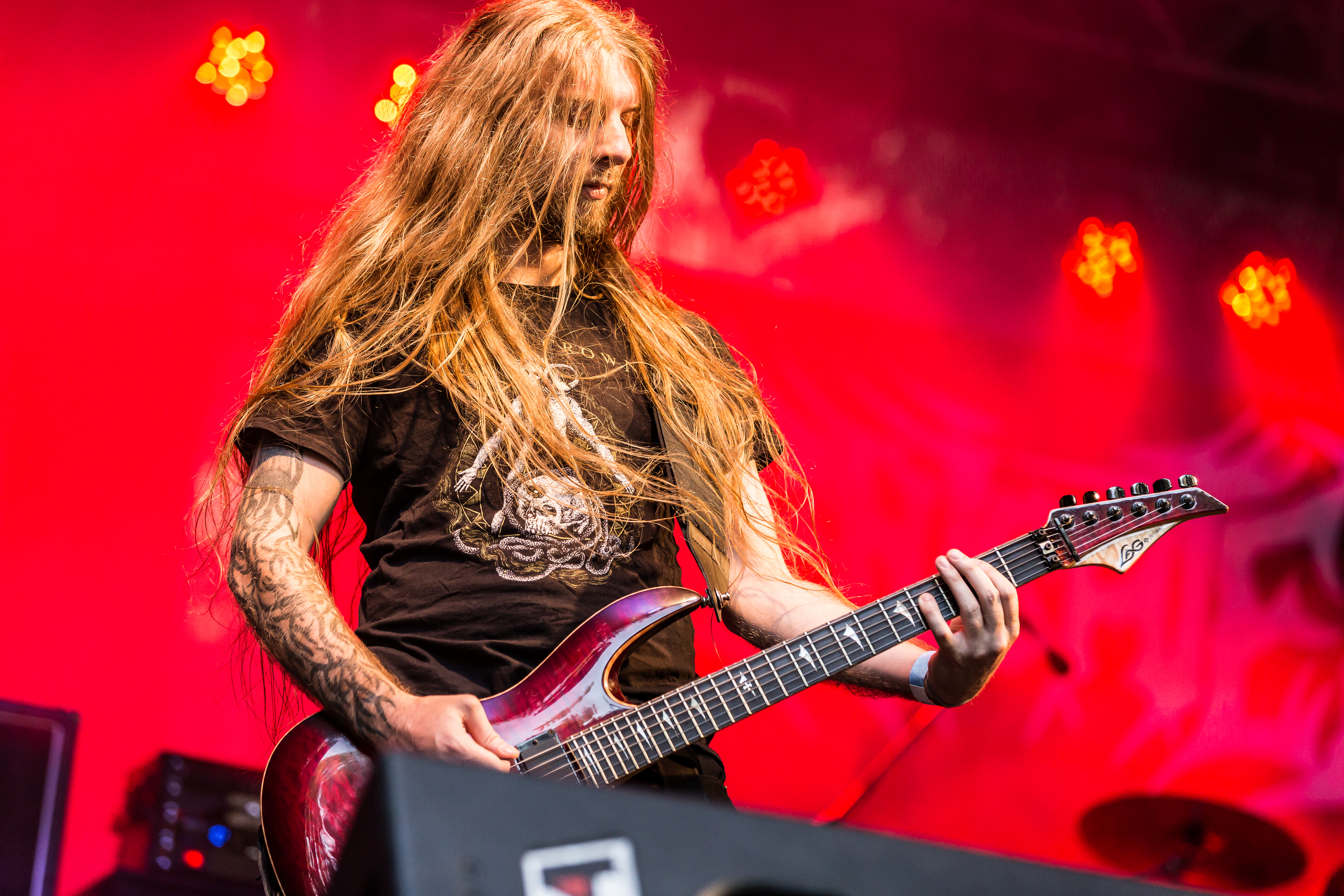
Emmanuel Dalle at RudE 2017

Benighted is a French deathgrind band formed in Saint-Étienne in 1998. The group comprises vocalist Julien Truchan, guitarist Emmanuel Dalle, bassist Pierre Arnoux and drummer Matthias Biechler. Benighted have released nine studio albums.

== History ==
Vocalist Julien Truchan, guitarists Liem N'Guyen and Olivier Gabriel, drummer Fred Fayolle and bassist Christophe "Chart" Charretier formed Benighted in Saint-Étienne, Rhône-Alpes, France, in May 1998. Their self-titled debut album was released independently in 2000, and combined death metal, black metal and grindcore. The following positive response earned the band a record deal with Adipocère Records in early 2001. During the 2001 recording sessions, Benighted moved towards a more technical death metal and released their second album, Psychose, in 2002. For the subsequent touring, Remy Aubrespin took over on bass.

The band entered the studio in late 2004, without a bassist. After the 2004 release of Insane Cephalic Production, bassist Eric Lombard joined the band. With Insane Cephalic Production, the band started working with producer Kristian "Kohle" Kohlmannslehner in his Kohlekeller Studio in Germany. Kohlmannslehner has produced all Benighted albums since then. Benighted subsequently toured Europe with Morbid Angel, Deicide and Fear Factory among others.

Benighted released their fourth album, Identisick, in 2006. Kevin "Kikou" Foley replaced Fayolle on drums. The band signed a new deal with Osmose Productions in 2007 and released Icon in October that year. In late 2009, Benighted signed to Season of Mist and released Asylum Cave in 2011. Truchan contributed guest vocals to the 2011 album Global Flatline by Aborted. A music video for the song "Let The Blood Spill Between My Broken Teeth" was released in February 2012.

Following a brief recording session, Benighted released their eighth full-length studio album, Necrobreed, on 24 February 2017 via Season of Mist records. This record was the first to feature drummer Romain Goulon. Necrobreed maintains the traditional fast-paced sound of Benighted, a mix of death metal and grindcore. The songwriting is based on grind.

The EP Dogs Always Bite Harder than Their Master came on the heels of the 2017 LP Necrobreed and consists of three new songs, a cover song, and six older songs recorded live, making EP almost 35 minutes long.

Obscene Repressed, the band's ninth studio album, was released on 10 April 2020. The album contains guest performances by Jamey Jasta from Hatebreed, Sebastian Grihm from Cytotoxin, and Karsten Jäger from Disbelief.

Benighted released their tenth studio album, Ekbom, on 12 April 2024. The track "Nothing Left to Fear" features guest vocals from Archspire's Oliver Rae Aleron.

== Band members ==
=== Current ===
- Julien Truchan – lead vocals (1998–present)
- Pierre Arnoux – bass, backing vocals (2014–present)
- Emmanuel Dalle – guitars (2014–present)
- Matthias Biechler – drums (2025–present)

=== Former ===
- Christophe "Chart" Charretier – bass (1998–2002)
- Fred Fayolle – drums (1998–2006; died 2019)
- Liem N'Guyen – guitars (1998–2012), bass (2002)
- Olivier Gabriel – guitars (1998–2017)
- Rémy Aubrespin – bass (2002–2003)
- Bertrand "Bert" Arnaud – bass (2003–2004)
- Eric "Candy" Lombard – bass (2004–2014)
- Kevin Foley – drums (2006–2016)
- Adrian Guérin – guitars (2012–2014)
- Alexis Lieu – bass (2014)
- Romain Goulon – drums (2016–2017)
- Fabien "Fack" Desgardins – guitars (2017–2022)
- Kevin Paradis – drums (2017–2024)
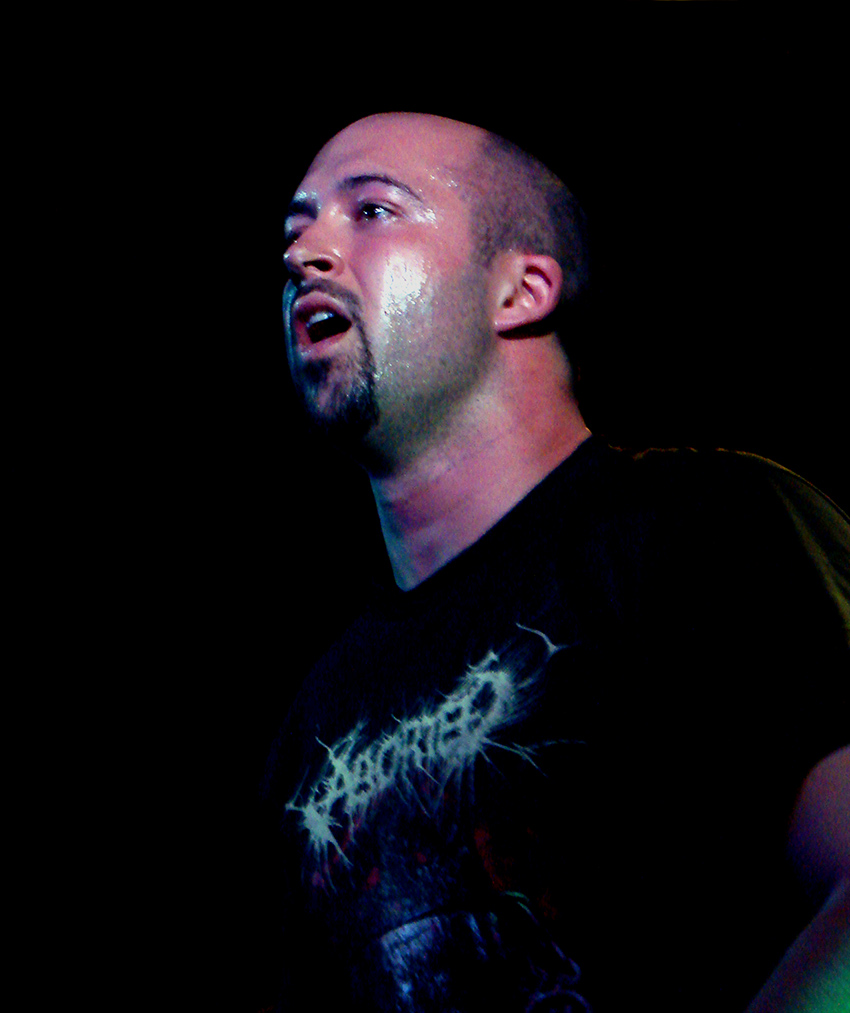
Julien Truchan

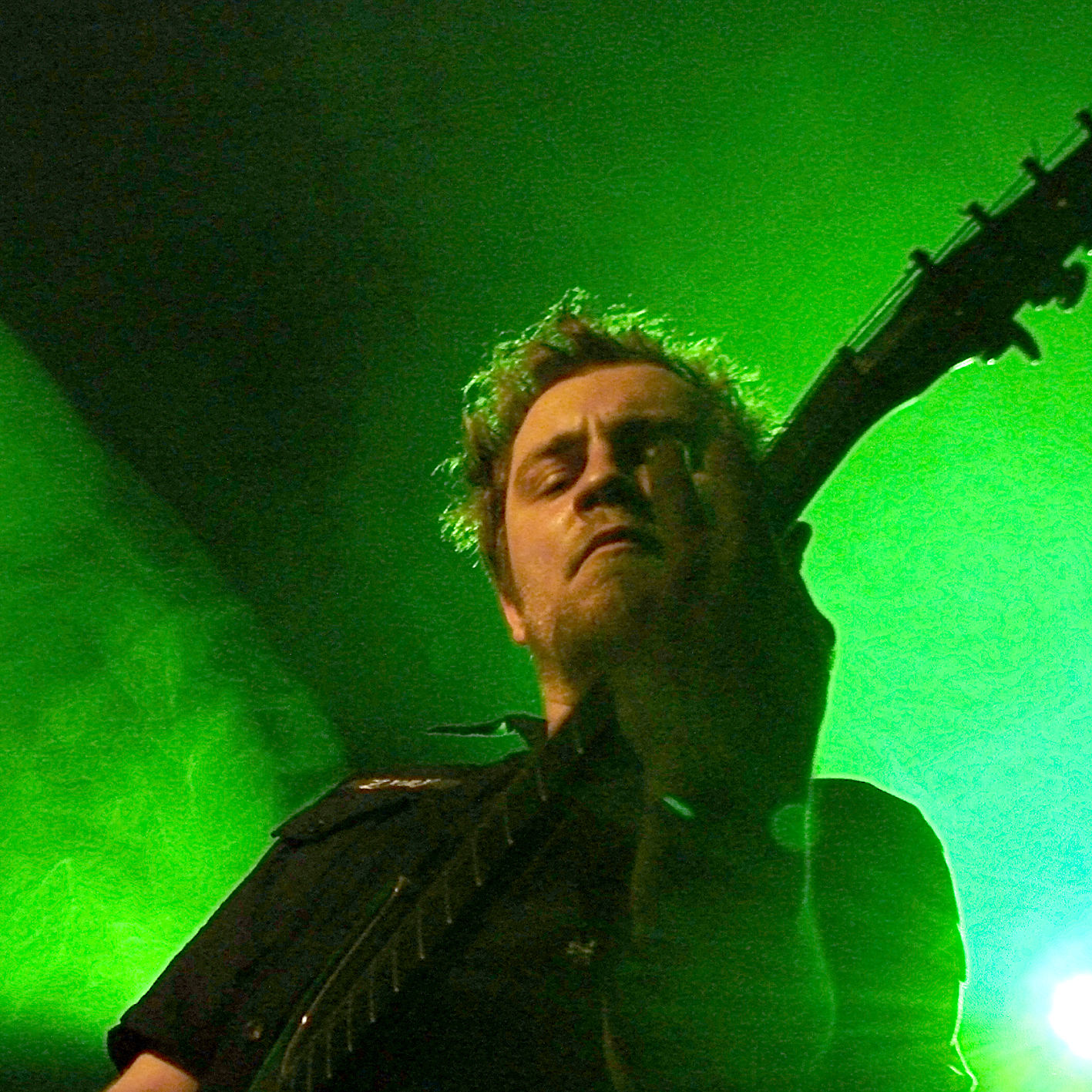
Olivier Gabriel

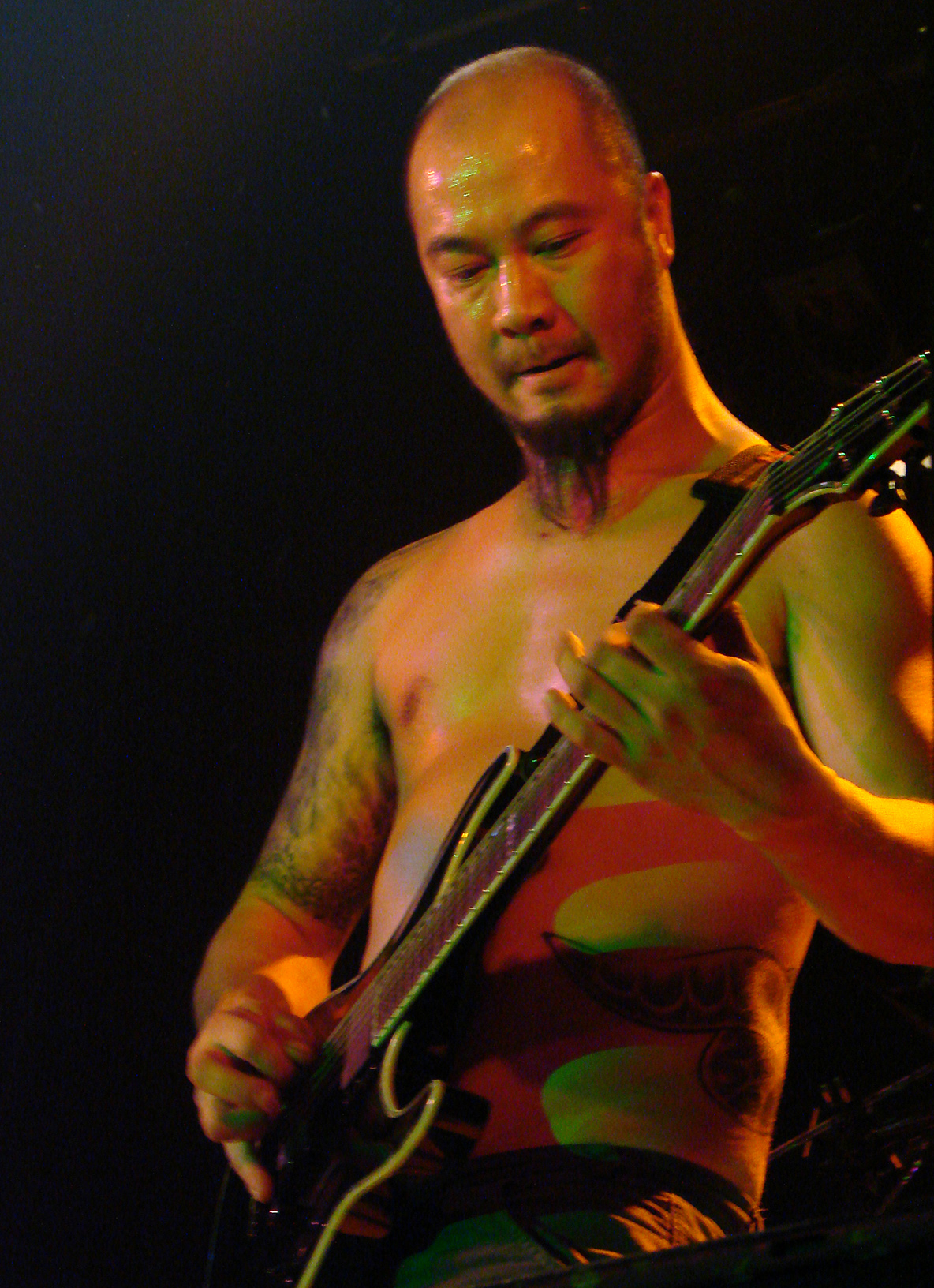
Liem N'Guyen

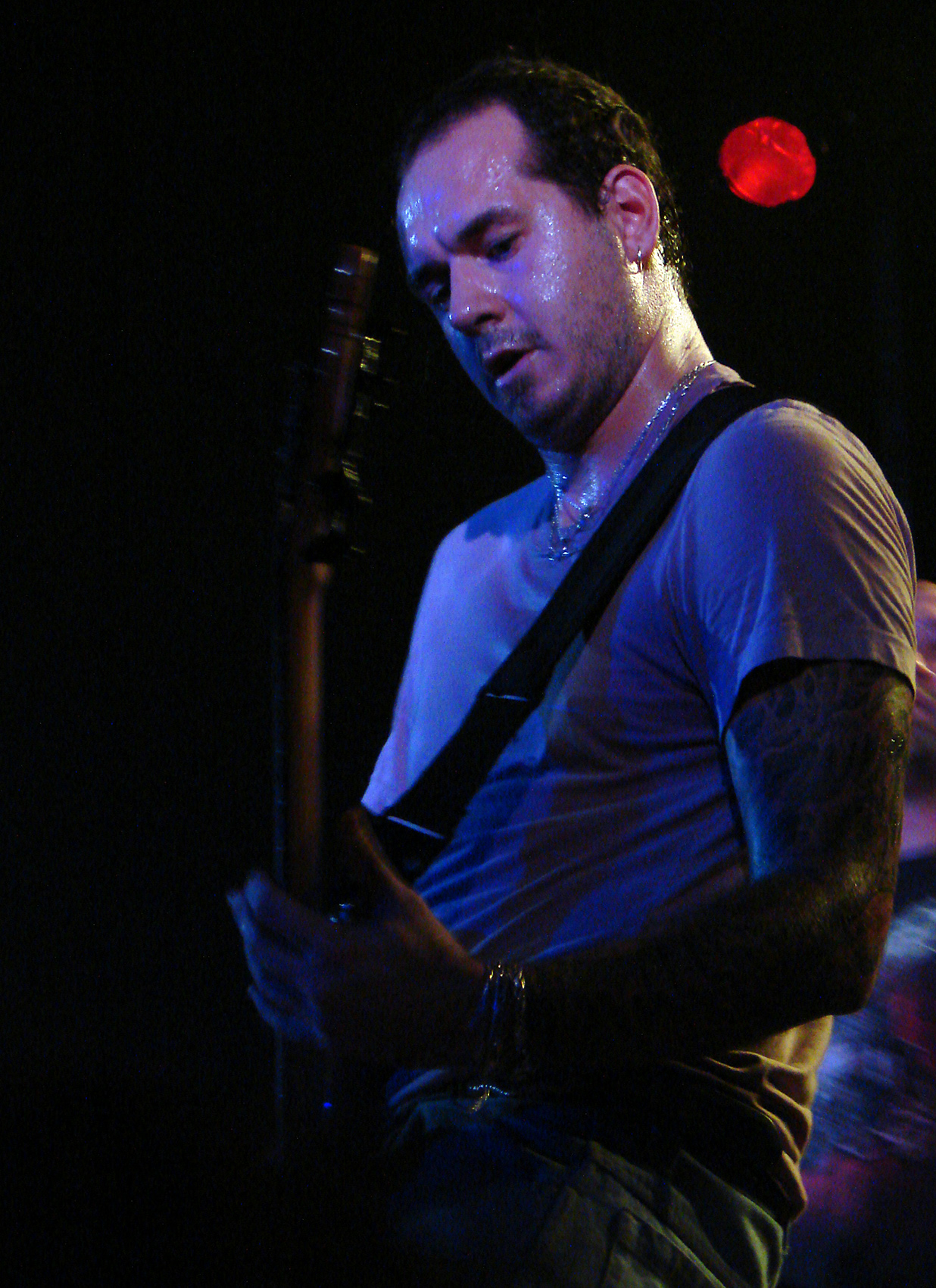
Eric Lombard

== Discography ==
Studio albums

- Benighted (2000)
- Psychose (2002)
- Insane Cephalic Production (2004)
- Identisick (2006)
- Icon (2007)
- Asylum Cave (2011)
- Carnivore Sublime (2014)
- Necrobreed (2017)
- Obscene Repressed (2020)
- Ekbom (2024)

Extended plays

- Dogs Always Bite Harder than Their Master (2018)
