= Aborted =

Belgian death metal band

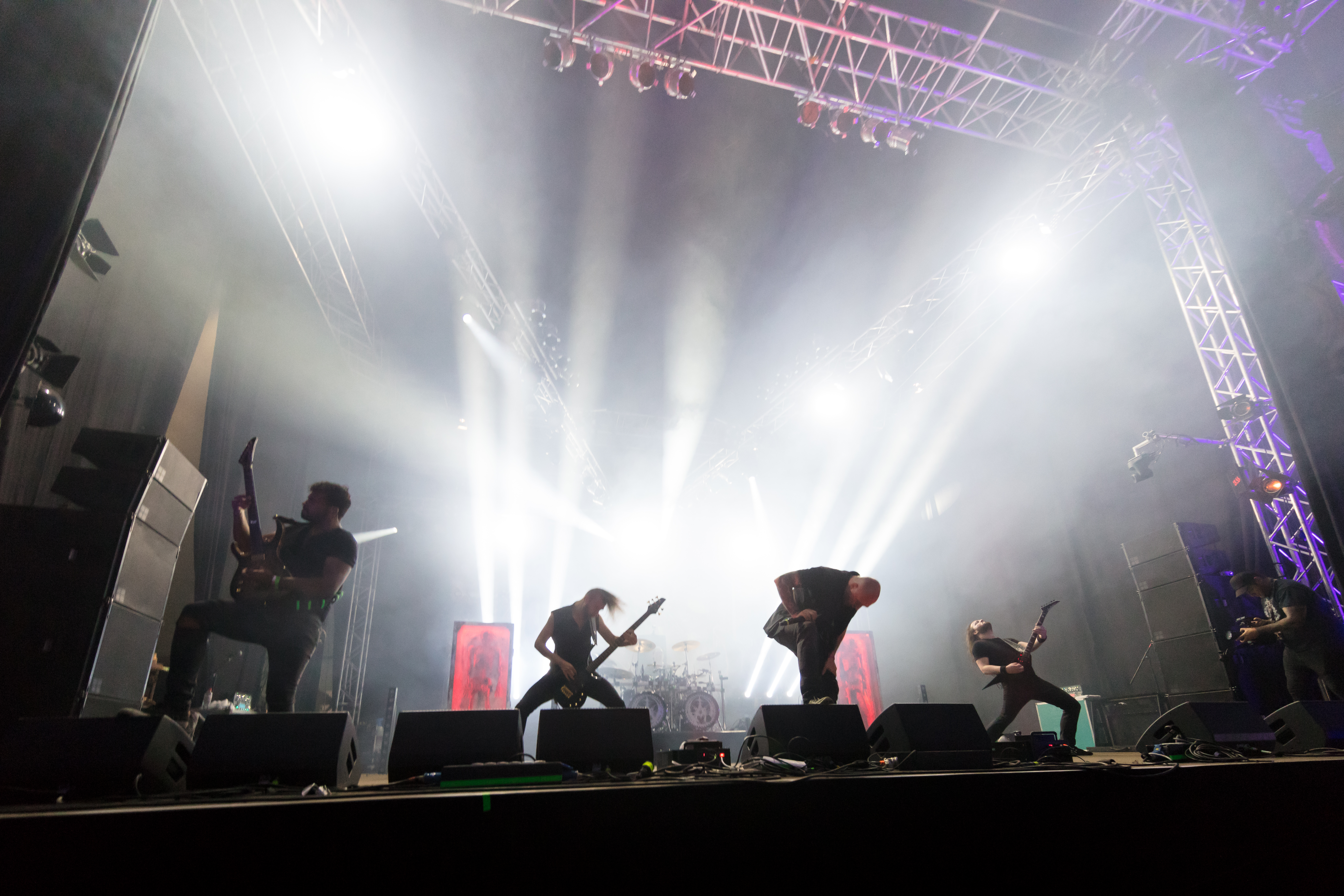
- Performing at 2017's Wacken Open Air

Background information
- Origin: Waregem, Belgium
- Genres: Death metal; grindcore; deathcore
- Years active: 1995–present
- Labels: Listenable; Century Media; Nuclear Blast
- Members: Sven de Caluwé; Ian Jekelis; Daníel Konradsson
- Past members: See former members here
- Website: goremageddon.be

Aborted is a Belgian death metal band formed in 1995 in Waregem. The group currently consists of vocalist, founder, and only constant member Sven de Caluwé, with guitarists Ian Jekelis and Dan Konráðsson. Although the band's entire lineup originally resided in Belgium, Aborted's current lineup features members from Belgium, Iceland, and the United States. The band has released twelve studio albums, six EPs, and one live DVD.

Aborted has been described as a deathgrind band, but their more recent material has been called deathcore. AllMusic has described the band's style as "unrestrained grindcore savagery and meticulously crafted death metal technicality".

== History ==
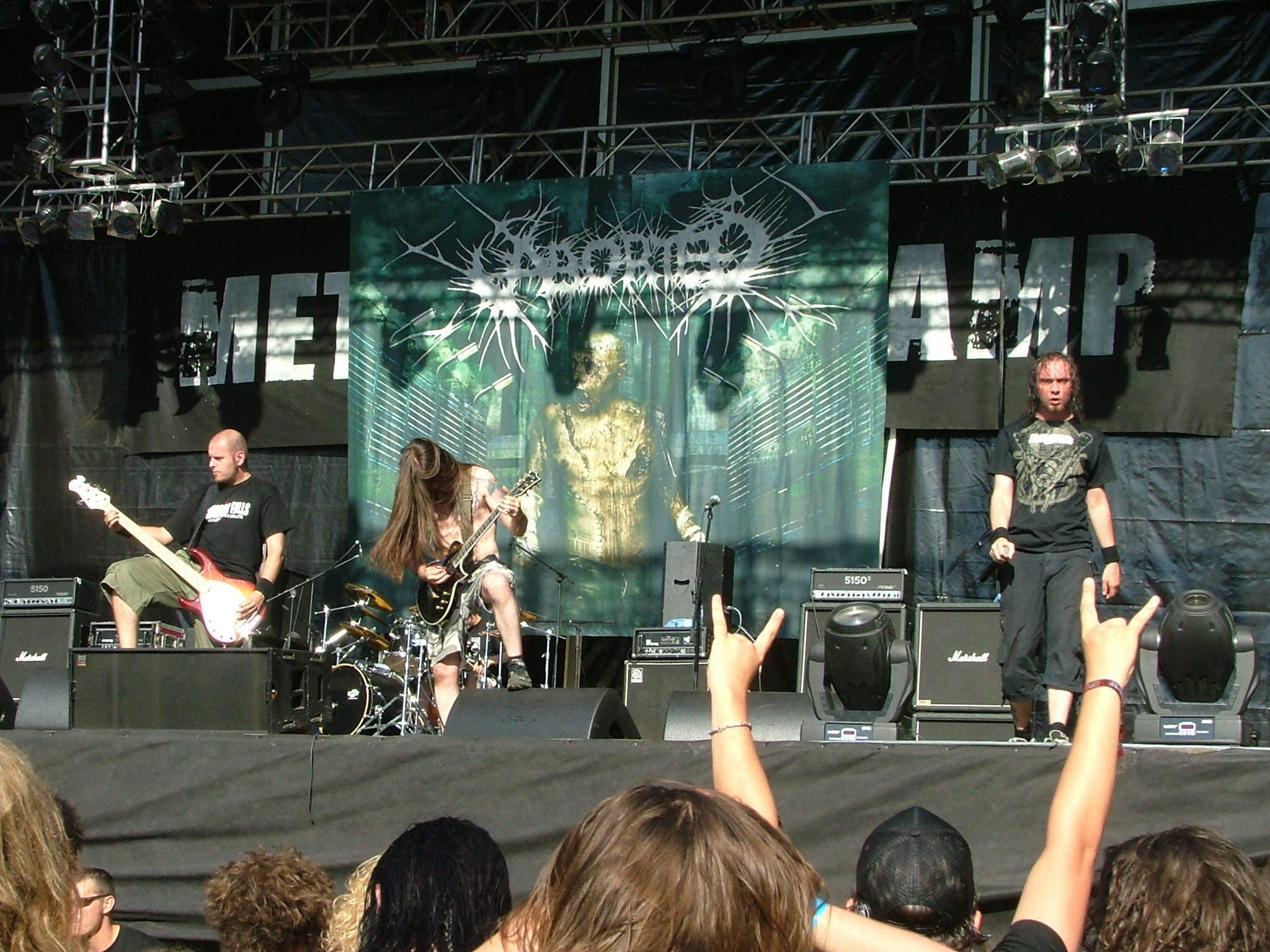
Aborted in 2007

Vocalist Sven de Caluwé founded Aborted in 1995 in Waregem. The band initially featured an all-Belgian lineup, consisting of de Caluwé, bassist Koen Verstraete, drummer Steven Logie and guitarists Niek Verstraete and Christophe Herreman. According to de Caluwé, the band was named "Aborted" hoping their CDs could be found on the racks in music stores as the first selections in the "A" section. A few years after forming, the band released the demo tape The Necrotorous Chronicles. Following early recordings and some live shows, the band signed with Uxicon Records. Since then, the band has released three splits (on Soulreaper Records, Bones Brigade, and Listenable Records), eight full-length albums, five EPs, and a DVD. Aborted are currently signed to Century Media Records. According to Allmusic, Aborted "had grown into the role of key contributors to the death-grind genres".

The band released the Coronary Reconstruction EP on 14 January 2010.

On 28 March 2011, de Caluwé announced that recording for Aborted's seventh studio album, Global Flatline, would begin in June. The album is reported to contain fifteen tracks. Jacob Hansen produced Global Flatline. Hansen previously worked with Aborted on 2003's Goremageddon: The Saw and the Carnage Done and 2004's The Haematobic EP.

On 20 June 2011, the band entered Hansen Studios in Denmark with Hansen to record Global Flatline. On 9 July 2011, it was confirmed that recording for Global Flatline was completed. Confirmed guest vocalists on the album include Julien Truchan of Benighted, Keijo Niinimaa of Rotten Sound and Jason Netherton of Misery Index. Global Flatline was released in January 2012. A digital single of the title track was released on 25 October 2011.

On 29 April 2014, The Necrotic Manifesto was released through Century Media and charted in the USA (Heatseeker charts spot 4), The Netherlands, Germany, Belgium, and France.

On 9 November 2015, Aborted announced their 20th anniversary EP Termination Redux, released on 8 January 2016, and a European tour date with Kataklysm and Septicflesh. On 12 February 2016, the band announced the release of their latest full-length album, Retrogore, on 22 April 2016. On 26 March 2018, the band announced their tenth album, TerrorVision, produced by Kristian "Kohle" Kohlmannslehner, which was released on 21 September 2018. In September 2021, Aborted released their eleventh album, ManiaCult. The band released their twelfth studio album, Vault of Horrors, on March 15, 2024.

== Band members ==
Current

- Sven "Svencho" de Caluwé — vocals (1995–present)
- Ian Jekelis — guitars (2015–present)
- Daníel Máni Konráðsson — guitars (2022–present)

Touring

- Siebe Hermans — drums (2025–present)

== Discography ==
=== Studio albums ===
- The Purity of Perversion (1999)
- Engineering the Dead (2001)
- Goremageddon: The Saw and the Carnage Done (2003)
- The Archaic Abattoir (2005)
- Slaughter & Apparatus: A Methodical Overture (2007)
- Strychnine.213 (2008)
- Global Flatline (2012)
- The Necrotic Manifesto (2014)
- Retrogore (2016)
- TerrorVision (2018)
- ManiaCult (2021)
- Vault of Horrors (2024)

=== Extended plays ===
- The Haematobic EP (2004)
- Coronary Reconstruction (2010)
- Scriptures of the Dead (2014)
- Termination Redux (2016)
- Bathos (2017)
- La Grande Mascarade (2020)

=== DVDs ===
- The Auricular Chronicles (Listenable, 2006)

=== Demo tapes ===
- The Necrotorous Chronicles (Esophagus, 1997)

=== Splits ===
- Eructations of Carnal Artistry (split CD with Christ Denied, 2000)
- Created to Kill (4-way split CD with Misery Index, Brodequin and Drowning, 2002)
- Deceased in the East/Extirpated Live Emanations (live split 10" record with Exhumed, 2003)
