= Trident Wolf Eclipse =

Studio album by Watain
- Released: 5 January 2018
- Recorded: 2017
- Studios: Necromorbus (Söderfors, Sweden)
- Genre: Black metal
- Length: 34:43
- Label: Century Media
- Producer: Tore Stjerna

Watain chronology
The Wild Hunt (2013)	Trident Wolf Eclipse (2018)	The Agony and Ecstasy of Watain (2022)

Singles from Trident Wolf Eclipse
- 1. "Nuclear Alchemy" Released: October 31, 2017; 2. "Sacred Damnation" Released: December 15, 2017

Trident Wolf Eclipse (stylized ·TRIDENT·WOLF·ECLIPSE·) is the sixth full-length studio album by Swedish black metal band Watain. The album was released on January 5, 2018, through Century Media Records. The album marks a significant shift away from the progressive style of Watain's previous album, The Wild Hunt, and a return to their earlier more traditional and aggressive black metal sound. According to frontman Erik Danielsson, the album title should be read as three separate words which were chosen to represent symbolic concepts which the band consider central to their music. Trident Wolf Eclipse received generally favourable reviews from music critics upon release.

== Background ==
In an interview with Decibel, frontman Erik Danielsson stated that the death of the band's close friend and collaborator Selim Lemouchi was one of "the most important thing that happened to the band" between The Wild Hunt and this album. He stated that "there's no hiding the fact that in between The Wild Hunt and this album we had to bury one of our members and go to his funeral together. [...] It perhaps underlines the gravity of the album and that this is not about fucking around. This is not a game. This is life and death. This is what Watain are about." Many of the lyrical themes which focus on empowerment and the attainment of force were influenced by the band's experience touring with Deströyer 666 in the years following the release of The Wild Hunt.

== Release, promotion ==
The band announced on August 3, 2017, that their sixth full-length studio album would be released on January 5, 2018. On October 31, 2017, the band released "Nuclear Alchemy" as a single on 7-inch vinyl and digital formats, as well as a music video directed by Claudio Marino of Artax Film. The single also features the B-side "Beyond", originally by the Hungarian black metal band Tormentor, which does not appear on the album itself.

== Musical style, writing ==
The album's writing process was greatly influenced by the death of the band's close friend Selim Lemouchi of The Devil's Blood, who committed suicide in 2014, and the band dedicated this album to him. Danielsson has said that "There [were] a lot of very powerful things in our bond, and I think a lot of that force and that bond made it into the album as a direct channeling of his ferocious spirit and fiery way of being. I definitely think those things are why Trident Wolf Eclipse sounds so ferocious."

Lyrically, Danielsson also explained that the album is a continuation of the themes explored on the band's first album, Rabid Death's Curse. "They're very much about the exploration of something that appears to you as darkness, something that seems utterly chaotic and unknown. [...] what they all have in common is that they explore the idea of empowerment and the attainment of force". All the band's members were involved in writing material for the album, but Danielsson stated that "it was Pelle [Forsberg] who contributed most with shaping the album in terms of atmosphere and general approach. Håkan [Jonsson] also wrote material, as per usual, including what I consider to be one of the record’s most central songs; “Towards the Sanctuary”." With regards to the five-year gap between the release of The Wild Hunt and Trident Wolf Eclipse, he has also stated that "we proceeded at our own pace and as a result broke our customary three-year cycle – which felt good, like the uprooting of all patterns eventually does."

Critics have noted that the album marks a significant change in musical direction for the band compared to their previous album, The Wild Hunt. Decibel described the album's sound as "harsh and austere", and wrote that "If The Wild Hunt was an epic and expansive attempt at the immortal, Trident Wolf Eclipse is all ritualistic and instinctive furies." PopMatters compared the album to Marduk's Panzer Division Marduk, and described the album as "a traditionalist album for Watain; they have focused on straight-for-the-throat Swedish black metal without any stylistic detours."

== Critical reception ==
Professional ratings
Review scores
Source	Rating
Decibel	7/10
Exclaim!	8/10
Metal Hammer	4/5 stars
Metal Storm	7.5/10
PopMatters	7/10 stars

The album received generally favourable reviews from music critics. Decibel wrote that the album is "a trove of simple pleasures; like the Wagnerian melodies subverted and assumed into the mercurial drama of "Teufelsreich", which in another dimension could have been used by Danny Elfman on the Batman score, or the slack-tempo discordance of "The Fire of Power," which closes the album with a ceremonial reckoning. Fire, blood... simple pleasures. We are all animals, after all, and Watain are speaking our language." PopMatters gave a positive assessment of the album, writing that "despite the songs' uniformity and very minimal use of codas rich in aphotic atmospheres, there is serious songcraft to be found within the shifting ferocity Watain emphasize since it is extremely difficult to arrange jolting transitions to flow together seamlessly." Metal Hammer praised the album's brevity, delivering "what is absolutely necessary and nothing more." On the one hand, they wrote that the album "offers little in the way of fresh revelations beyond the mild surprise that Watain have become better songwriters than ever by stripping things back to blistering basics", but concluded that "in truth, this is all part of Watain’s usual campaign of musical destruction: it’s just the streamlined, haven’t-got-time-to-fuck-about version, and it’s devilishly good." Stereogum praised the band's return to their earlier, more aggressive black metal style, writing that "This is easily the band’s most ruthlessly intense album since 2003 sophomore LP Casus Luciferi, and it may in fact be the gnarliest, weirdest, darkest thing they’ve ever made" and called it their "least accessible album, and the most exciting thing they’ve done in a decade." BrooklynVegan wrote that "It’s not that different from the more aggressive songs on its predecessor — it’s still got sharp, clear production, memorable riffs, soaring solos, and a tremendous vocal delivery (no clean-sung ballad but it does have a lengthy, slow-paced closer with spoken word vocals in the background). It’s the kind of album any Watain fan could like. And if you’re new to Watain, this is a fine place to jump in. The transition between turning this off and putting on the classic Casus Luciferi is seamless."

== Track listing ==
All lyrics are written by Erik Danielsson; all music is composed by Watain.

No.	Title	Length
1.	"Nuclear Alchemy"	3:10
2.	"Sacred Damnation"	4:41
3.	"Teufelsreich"	4:26
4.	"Furor Diabolicus"	4:43
5.	"A Throne Below"	4:09
6.	"Ultra (Pandemoniac)"	4:01
7.	"Towards the Sanctuary"	4:54
8.	"The Fire of Power"	4:24

Deluxe edition bonus tracks
No.	Title	Length
9.	"Antikrists Mirakel"	7:09
10.	"Lekarim Stsirkitna" (Only available on vinyl boxset bonus 7-inch EP)	7:26

== Personnel ==
- Watain – all music
  - Erik Danielsson
  - Pelle Forsberg
  - Håkan Jonsson
  - Set Teitan
  - Alvaro Lillo
- Tore Stjerna – recording, mixing, mastering
- H. Death – guitar solo on track 6
- Attila "Mayhem" Csihar – guest vocals on track 6
- Oik Wasfuk – front cover, back cover
- Timo Ketola – inner artwork
- Michael Childers – emblem
- Erik Danielsson – additional artwork, layout, calligraphy
- Metalion – gatefold photography
- Sara Gewalt – photography

== Charts ==
Chart (2018)	Peak position
Austrian Albums (Ö3 Austria)	24
Belgian Albums (Ultratop Flanders)	76
Finnish Albums (Suomen virallinen lista)	27
German Albums (Offizielle Top 100)	6
Swedish Albums (Sverigetopplistan)	3
Swiss Albums (Schweizer Hitparade)	38
