= The Wild Hunt (Watain album) =

Studio album by Watain
- Released: 19 August 2013
- Recorded: January – May 2013
- Studios: Necromorbus Studio, Stockholm; Blueflame Productions Studios, Uppsala; Studio 33, Toivala; Studio Sound, Kuopio
- Genres: Black metal, heavy metal, doom metal, progressive metal
- Length: 61:29
- Labels: Season of Mist, Century Media
- Producers: Tore Stjerna, Watain

Watain chronology
Lawless Darkness (2010)	The Wild Hunt (2013)	Trident Wolf Eclipse (2018)

Singles from The Wild Hunt
- 1. "All That May Bleed" Released: 21 June 2013

The Wild Hunt is the fifth studio album by Swedish black metal band Watain. It was released through Century Media on 19 August 2013 in Europe and 20 August 2013 in USA. The cover art was painted "in oil and mixed materials" by Zbigniew M. Bielak, who was also responsible for the artwork of Lawless Darkness. The album sold around 2,700 copies in the United States in its first week of release, and was the best-selling album in their home country of Sweden on the week of its release, making it the band's highest sales and chart debut to date. Stylistically the album represents a development of Watain's established black metal sound, incorporating influences from heavy metal, doom metal, and progressive metal. It is also the first Watain album to feature vocalist Erik Danielsson performing clean vocals.

== Background ==
Watain's previous album Lawless Darkness was a significant critical and commercial success for the band. It earned the band their first Swedish Grammi for 'Best Hard Rock' album in 2011, and the album's single 'Reaping Death' was certified gold in Sweden by the IFPI for sales in excess of 10,000 copies. Following the success of Lawless Darkness, as well as notable live performances at Wacken and Bloodstock in 2012, the band signed with Century Media Records in November 2012, confirming that their fifth full-length album would be released through the label in 2013. The Wild Hunt is Watain's first album released on Century Media, and their first release on a major record label.

== Musical style, writing, composition ==
Music critics have noted that represents some significant stylistic changes compared to the band's previous albums. AllMusic's Gregory Heaney wrote that the band "continues to bend and expand the form, tempering the icy chill of classic black metal with atmospheric touches, creating an experience that feels epic and sprawling compared to the suffocating sounds one typically associates with the genre. By adding in touches of doom, prog, and symphonic metal, Watain is able to push the boundaries of black metal while still keeping things on the extreme end of the spectrum, providing them with a kind of accessibility that doesn't require them to sacrifice any of the more terrifying aspects of their sound in the process." Stereogum's Michael Nelson compared the band's progression on this album to Metallica, and this album to Metallica's 'Black Album', writing that "the similarities are striking: The Wild Hunt is Watain’s most straightforward collection, their most traditional rock-based collection; it’s also a tremendous leap, from the lofty, daunting – and perhaps inaccessible – peaks previously scaled by the band into a wide, deep, very big pond."

The album was written over a period of about three years, beginning after the release of their previous album. Much of the lyrics were "written on the road, in Australia, Japan, USA and Transylvania." Discussing the meaning behind the album, Erik Danielsson said:

"The Wild Hunt has a very retrospective concept actually. It’s very much about us looking back on this journey that we have been on for these last 15 years and the songs all relate, in one way or another, to very defined experiences and ideas; struggles, trials and tribulations that we have been through during this time. I don’t mean to make it seem like it’s an autobiographical concept, because it isn’t really, it is in a certain sense, but it is still a very lofty and spiritual concept at the same time. It’s a divine idea, The Wild Hunt really. And I found it a really inspiring concept to work with, although the individual songs in themselves we never really paid attention to the concept when we wrote them, it was more something that we realised afterwards."

== Recording, production ==
The band began recording the album on 3 January 2013, almost exactly three years after they began recording their previous album Lawless Darkness, and took about four months to complete. The exact order of the songs was left open during the recording of the album. The band also decided to record in multiple studios rather than just one as they had done for previous albums because "being in the studio for that long, working in various places, and traveling around like a bunch of fucking gypsies with equipment (laughs), it left its mark on the album." Danielsson added that the recording process was "emotionally very demanding and challenging", crediting this for "that extra dimension of diversity and you never know what you expect from it really. I think the whole recording process actually colored the album a lot."

The final song to be written for the album was the closing track 'Holocaust Dawn', a song which Danielsson has explained means a lot to him personally. "It was a song, that in the end, kind of summed up the whole process of recording the album and everything we wanted to say with it. It is a song which is full of equal amounts of sorrow and tragedy as it is on the victory and triumph; about a very divine influence. The song just became very special. It was also the last song we wrote for the album and it was just one of those songs where after we did it, it was like – ok, we are done, that was that – you know."

On the collector's edition of the album is an exclusive 7" which features a song titled 'XI'. Much of the music was written by Jon Nödtveidt, and the lyrics were provided by Set Teitan who was the guitarist in Nödtveidt's band Dissection at the time of his death. Erik Danielsson has said in an interview that

"I played bass with Dissection on their last three shows and Set Teitan, our guitar player, he played guitar in Dissection since after Jon came out of prison, so we have always had a very strong connection with Dissection. This song you’re referring to is called 'XI', and we recorded it during 'The Wild Hunt' sessions. To say it’s a special thing doesn’t really say it. It’s more, much more than that. It basically was a song that was still un-recorded by Dissection, that was written around the time of Reinkaos. It was never played live and never really properly finished like an actual song. We had the riffs and Set wrote the lyrics, and the people that now take care of the Dissection legacy approved of everything, of course. These things are you have to understand this isn’t just like doing a cover of a band. It’s about life and death and it’s about [...] preserving a legacy. [...] Through the 17 years that Watain have existed now, I think that’s one of the most special things we have ever done in a recording.

== Artwork, packaging ==
Limited edition mediabook cover

The artwork for The Wild Hunt was created by Zbigniew M. Bielak using oils and other materials. Bielak was also responsible for the artwork of the band's previous album, Lawless Darkness. According to the band, the piece "depicts one of the inmost shrines of Watain's temple. As on every classic still life, each object has a significant meaning, while each song of the album is also connected to an object."

The album was released on a variety of formats. Besides the standard CD version in a jewelcase, a limited edition mediabook CD version was also released. This was housed in a black slipcase with exclusive gold cover artwork (depicted to the left) with the mediabook inside. This featured a 24-page booklet. A collector's edition limited to 2,000 copies was released exclusively through the band's Wolf Wear webstore. This featured the album on deluxe gatefold on two red 180-gram vinyl records; the limited edition mediabook CD version with 24-page booklet; an exclusive 7" record with the song 'XI' (an unreleased Dissection song written by Jon Nödtveidt, lyrics by Set Teitan, recorded by Watain during The Wild Hunt studio sessions); an exclusive 7" record with the bonus song 'When Stars No More Shine' in two versions (the original and a re-recorded 2013 version); a woven altar cloth; a poster; 5 postcards; a metal pin; and a signed and hand-numbered autograph card. This was packaged in a red box with exclusive artwork pressed in gold.

== Release, promotion, marketing ==
Watain announced the album title and release date for The Wild Hunt on 1 May 2013, confirming that the album was mixed at Necromorbus Studio in Sweden by Tore Stjerna. On 12 June the band announced further details about the album title, artwork, and track listing. On 24 June, the band premiered the single 'All That May Bleed' to promote the album, and was released the following day as a 7" single and as a digital download with a b-side cover of the song 'Play With the Devil' by Taiwaz. On 9 July, the band provided further details about the various formats and editions it would be available in. The band released a promotional flexi disc for Decibel subscribers featuring a cover of GG Allin's 'Fuck Off, We Murder' in the magazine's September issue. The band were featured on the issue's cover, and the issue included an interview with Danielsson about the album. The band were also featured on the covers of Terrorizer, Rock Tribune, Scream Magazine, and Sweden Rock. The album's second single 'The Child Must Die' was premiered on Stereogum on 17 July, described by the band as "a song of sorrow and liberation, of the sacrifices that the path of adversity requires."

A week before the album's release, Century Media released a special "bootleg" version of the album in the United States in certain independent record stores. This edition features a simple white sleeve and stamp, hand-numbered and limited to 500 copies. The album was officially released on 19 August 2013 in Europe, and on 20 August in the United States. The band also recorded their first music video for the song 'Outlaw', which was published on 5 December 2013. The video was directed by Watain and Johan Bååth, who also directed the band's 2012 DVD 'Opus Diaboli'. Erik Danielsson described it as "a knife stab in the face of today's clean and witty metal scene and yet another step for us to bring back something real and extreme into this limping music movement."

== Touring ==
"The Wild Hunt" world tour opened on 24 August 2013 in Watain's home town, Uppsala. They toured across much of the United States with In Solitude and Tribulation. They also toured across Europe, as well as Japan in 2015. On 15 June 2014 the band performed a 'special' show in Brooklyn, NYC at the Brooklyn Bazaar. This controversial performance went on to draw attention from news outlets due to the band drenching the crowd in pig's blood, and allegedly causing members of the audience to begin throwing up.

== Critical reception ==
=== Critical reception ===
Professional ratings
Review scores
Source	Rating
About.com	2.5/5 stars
AllMusic	4/5 stars
Blabbermouth	8.5/10
Exclaim!	9/10
Loudwire	4/5 stars
Metal Hammer	4.5/5 stars
MetalSucks	3.5/5 stars
Pitchfork	6.7/10
Spin	7/10
Ultimate Guitar	6/10

The album received mostly positive reviews from music critics, however the change in style was a controversial point among critics and fans. Exclaim! wrote that the band "have opted to explore a more varied, but no less infernal sound on their fifth studio record", describing it as "a more diverse, exploratory effort than their previous offerings, employing down-tempo, moodier pieces like "The Child Must Die," alongside searing, charging monsters like "Sleepless Evil"." About.com were much more critical of the change. They criticized the song 'They Rode On', writing that its "sheer saccharine nature and obvious attempt at a cash grab wouldn’t be so laughable if the song just wasn’t so awful. It is, and sullies what is already, at best, an average melodic black metal album devoid of personality and a sense of viciousness or mystique." Pitchfork described the title track as "an awkward doom pose, like a tourist that knows the language of the land he’s visiting but lacks the subtlety or fluidity to engage native speakers", adding that "Outside of their element, Watain often sound simply like outsiders. They have strong interests and ideas, if not the experiences and abilities to actualize them. The effort is laudable, at least: Remember, Watain didn’t emerge as a fully formed great band, but they’ve grown into something of one. Maybe their clumsy stumbles, however public now, simply take time to perfect." Metal Hammer's Amit Sharma described it as "the most important album of Watains’s career: one which will see them rise into the mainstream or cast back into the pits of the underground." Sharma praised the album's production, noting that "this is the most accessible Watain have ever sounded", while noting that none of their "venom" has been diminished by this change. The review concluded that with "more texture than anything Watain have recorded before, The Wild Hunt is the sound of Sweden’s deadliest soldiers of the night bringing their darkness closer to the light of day."

=== Accolades ===
Award	Publication	Position
AllMusic's Favorite Metal Albums of 2013	AllMusic	—
Top 40 Albums of 2013	Decibel	37
The 5 Best Extreme Metal Albums of 2013	Kerrang!	1
Top 100 Metal & Rock Albums of 2013	New Noise Magazine	79
Top 50 Albums of 2013	Terrorizer	3
Best Metal of 2013	The Quietus	13

== Track listing ==
All tracks are written by Watain.

No.	Title	Length
1.	"Night Vision" (instrumental)	3:38
2.	"De Profundis"	4:33
3.	"Black Flames March"	6:20
4.	"All That May Bleed"	4:41
5.	"The Child Must Die"	6:04
6.	"They Rode On"	8:43
7.	"Sleepless Evil"	5:37
8.	"The Wild Hunt"	6:20
9.	"Outlaw"	5:07
10.	"Ignem Veni Mittere" (instrumental)	4:39
11.	"Holocaust Dawn"	7:07
Total length:		61:29

Limited edition mediabook
No.	Title	Length
12.	"When Stars No More Shine"	6:27

Collector's edition bonus 7" – XI
No.	Title	Lyrics	Music	Length
1.	"XI"	Set Teitan	Jon Nödtveidt, Watain	3:21

Collector's edition bonus 7" – When Stars No More Shine
No.	Title	Length
1.	"When Stars No More Shine" (1998 version)	3:03
2.	"When Stars No More Shine" (2013 version)	3:29

== Personnel ==
=== Watain ===
- Erik Danielsson – lead vocals, bass, guitar
- Håkan Jonsson – drums
- Pelle Forsberg – guitar

=== Additional musicians ===
- Set Teitan – lyrics on "Black Flames March"
- Staffan Winroth – accordion, fiddle
- Anna Norberg – additional vocals at the ending of "They Rode On"

=== Technical personnel ===
- Tore Stjerna – engineer, mastering, mixing, production
- Zbigniew M. Bielak – artwork
- Trident Arts – design
- Ester Segarra – photography

== Chart performance ==
Chart (2013)	Peak position
Belgian Albums (Ultratop Flanders)	132
Belgian Albums (Ultratop Wallonia)	166
Finnish Albums (Suomen virallinen lista)	25
French Albums (SNEP)	164
German Albums (Offizielle Top 100)	18
Swedish Albums (Sverigetopplistan)	1
Swiss Albums (Schweizer Hitparade)	73
US Billboard 200	158
US Heatseekers Albums (Billboard)	6
US Independent Albums (Billboard)	36
US Top Hard Rock Albums (Billboard)	15
US Top Rock Albums (Billboard)	50
