= Watain =

Swedish black metal band

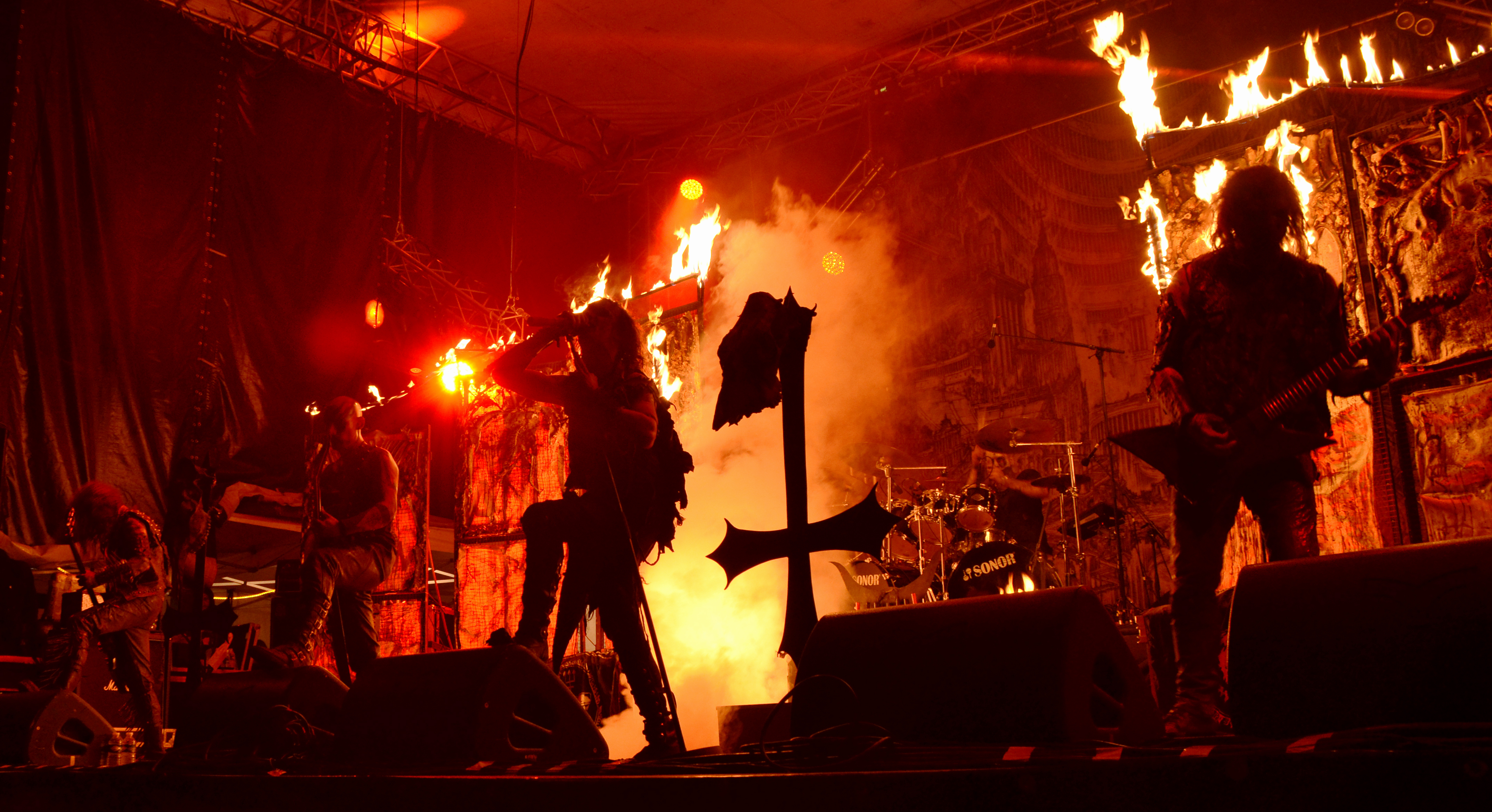
- Watain performing at Fall of Summer Festival 2014

Background information
- Origin: Uppsala, Sweden
- Genre: Black metal
- Years active: 1998–present
- Labels: His Master's Noise; Nuclear Blast; Century Media; Season of Mist; Drakkar Productions
- Members: Erik Danielsson; Håkan Jonsson; Pelle Forsberg
- Website: templeofwatain.com

Watain is a Swedish black metal band, formed in 1998. The band's name is taken from an early recording by the American black metal group Von. The band have become famous for their theistic Satanist views and for their live shows which involve pyrotechnics, candles, Satanic rituals, animal carcasses, and blood. At a now-notorious live performance in Brooklyn in 2014, they doused audience members in animal blood, allegedly causing some members of the audience to vomit. This was picked up and publicised by TMZ, generating controversy around the incident. To date they have released seven full-length albums, as well as three live albums and a number of demos and EPs. Their most recent album The Agony & Ecstasy of Watain was released on 29 April 2022 through Nuclear Blast. The band's core lineup has remained stable since their formation, consisting of Erik Danielsson, Pelle Forsberg, and Håkan Jonsson, though as of 2015 Jonsson no longer performs live, Emil Svensson (aka E. Forcas) of fellow Uppsala death metal band Degial was recruited as live drummer.

== History ==
Watain was formed in 1998. According to Erik Danielsson, when the band formed, "there weren't really any bands anymore that seemed to take things that seriously, and there weren't that many bands that actually consisted of, you know, people that did so much more than just play the music that they liked and the same kind of music that their idols play". They released their demo Go Fuck Your Jewish "God" in 1998 and their live tape Black Metal Sacrifice in 1999, which they do not intend to re-release. In October 1999, the band released their EP The Essence of Black Purity through Grim Rune Productions, which they consider to be their first official release, and played on a show together with Malign and Dark Funeral, organised by Watain and Grim Rune Productions.

Watain's debut album Rabid Death's Curse was released through End All Life Productions and Drakkar Productions in 2000, followed by a split EP with Diabolicum released through Spikekult Records. A split LP with Malign was planned in the early 2000s and supposed to be issued by Grim Rune Productions before the recording of Watain's second album Casus Luciferi, but never got released. Watain toured Europe with Unpure in early 2002. In 2003, they again entered the studio to record their second full-length album, Casus Luciferi, which features lyrics by Necromorbus of Funeral Mist (who also produced all their studio releases since The Essence of Black Purity and played live bass for them), MkM of Antaeus and Scorn of Katharsis. The Stellar Descension Infernal Tour through Europe followed, alongside Secrets of the Moon and Averse Sefira. They also toured throughout 18 countries with Dissection on their two months-long 'Rebirth of Dissection' tour in 2004. Dissection member Set Teitan supported Watain in Russia in 2005 due to live bassist Whorth's absence, and later became an official live member of the band.

Watain in 2012

Watain's third full-length album Sworn to the Dark was released in Europe on 21 February 2007, then they toured Europe along with Celtic Frost, Kreator and Legion of the Damned. In 2008, they played their first headlining tour in North America with Withered and Book of Black Earth. Eclipse Eternal and Kronosfear joined them for some shows as well.

In 2010, Watain released a single for the song "Reaping Death" in two formats, picture disc vinyl with a cover of the song "Chains of Death" by Death SS, and digisleeve CD with a cover of the song "The Return of Darkness and Evil" by Bathory. It was followed by the album Lawless Darkness, released on 7 June 2010, which received very positive reviews from music critics and earned the band their first Swedish Grammi for 'Best Hard Rock' album. In 2012, Watain performed at Wacken Open Air and Bloodstock. The band participated in the U.S. Decibel tour with Behemoth and In Solitude, and supported Behemoth again on their 'The Satanist' tour of Australia with Bölzer. On 7 May 2012 the band released a DVD and live album Opus Diaboli – 13 Years of Black Metal Magic directed by Johan Bääth and Watain.

Their fifth full-length album, The Wild Hunt, was released on 19 and 20 August 2013 in Europe and United States, respectively, and featured a change in style for the band as they incorporated elements of heavy metal, progressive metal, and doom metal. The album release was followed by a world tour that began in Uppsala on 24 August. In January 2015, Watain, Mayhem, and Revenge played together as part of the "Black Metal Warfare" tour in the United States. Mayhem and Watain toured again in the US in November 2015 with Rotting Christ as "Part II" of the previous tour.

In January 2016 vocalist Erik Danielsson was the subject of the third and final instalment in a documentary titled 'Music, Blood and Spirit: The Life and Work of Erik Danielsson'. The film is "the third in a trilogy about people who are 100% devoted to what society labels as unorthodox beliefs or lifestyles." In July 2016 the band announced that they would again tour with Mayhem in December. The tour was titled 'The Past Is Alive' and consisted of seven European dates. The bands performed their albums Casus Luciferi and De Mysteriis Dom Sathanas in full. Watain confirmed these would be the final times Casus Luciferi will ever be performed in full. On 27 October 2016 the band confirmed in a newsletter that their sixth full-length album was underway. On 12 November 2016 Watain's vocalist Erik Danielsson performed with Mortuary Drape at their 30th anniversary celebration show. In December 2016 a 7" split EP between Watain and Mayhem titled 'Sathanas / Luciferi Tour EP' was available exclusively at this tour's shows, and featured a live song from each band recorded from the tour.

On 2 August 2017, Watain confirmed the release date of their long-awaited sixth Full-length studio album, the title of which was later revealed as Trident Wolf Eclipse. This release was accompanied by a short album release tour in several selected venues in Europe. The first single titled 'Nuclear Alchemy' from the new album, was released on 31 October. Trident Wolf Eclipse was officially released on 5 January 2018 through Century Media Records to generally favourable reviews from critics who noted that the album signalled a return to the band's earlier, more aggressive black metal style compared to their previous album The Wild Hunt.

Due to the COVID-19 pandemic, Watain was forced to cancel and indefinitely postpone their planned performances at Hellfest 2020, Las Vegas and their Walpurgis Night concert in their hometown of Uppsala, these performances were meant to mark the end of the Trident Wolf Eclipse album cycle. The band independently released an exclusive 7 track live cassette tape titled Corona Mortis on 2 July 2020 which was limited to the number of pre-orders and never to be reprinted again as part of a campaign fund to counter the pandemic's impact, the tape is a one take rehearsal recorded at the band's headquarters.

On 5 August 2021, Watain announced that they had signed with Nuclear Blast Records and had entered Necromorbus Studio to start working on their seventh studio album, planned for release in the spring of 2022. The band planned to support this album with a co-headlining US tour with Mayhem. However, the band was forced to pull out of the tour before it began due to visa issues. On 3 February 2022, the band announced their upcoming album, The Agony & Ecstasy of Watain, which was released on 29 April. It is the band's first album to not feature founding member Håkan Jonsson playing drums, but he did contribute in the songwriting process with the rest of the lineup.

On 20 September 2025, Watain announced that on the same date in 2028, they would release their eighth and final album and subsequently end the band as a commemoration of their 30th anniversary.

== Musical style and ideology ==
Since the beginning of their career, Watain have often been compared to Dissection or considered to be influenced by Ofermod. Erik Danielsson confirmed that "Watain and Dissection do indeed have a lot in common as bands, both musically and spiritually", but also replied that questions like these "are completely irrelevant in relation to the great abomination from which both Dissection and Watain were born out of". Bands named as influences include Bathory, Mayhem, Mercyful Fate, Death SS, Samael and Necrovore.

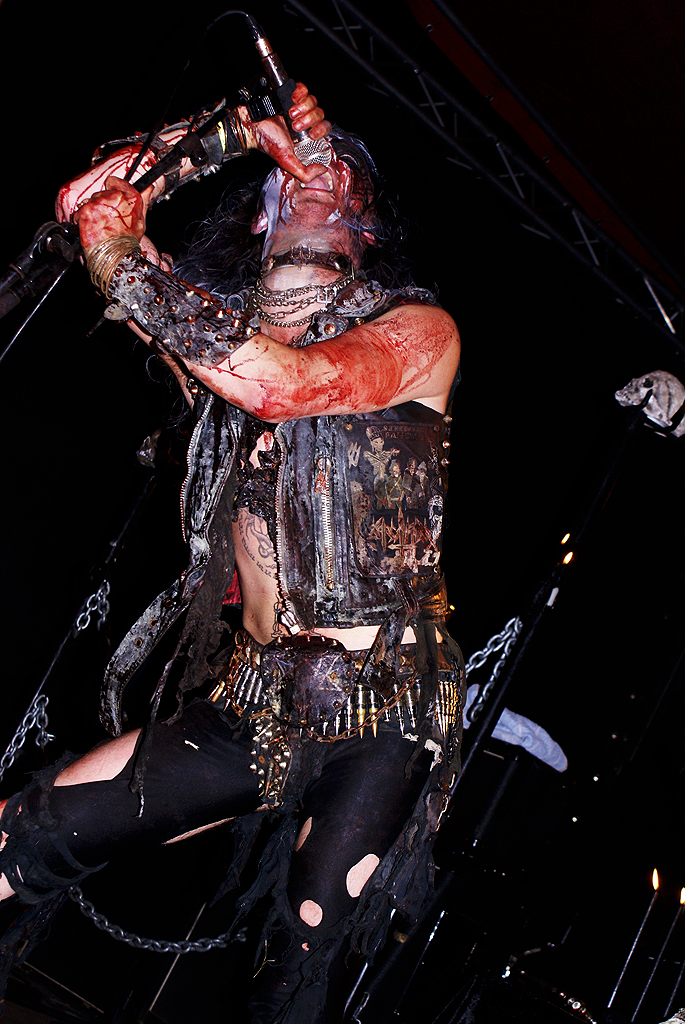
Erik Danielsson in torn clothes, covered with blood

Allmusic journalist Eduardo Rivadavia wrote that their debut album Rabid Death's Curse "suggested that Watain were, at best, content to produce intentionally crude facsimiles of inspirational forefathers ranging from Bathory to Mayhem and, at worst, unable to do anything else" but "fulfills an important function in Watain's career arc, one that the casual listener need never pay heed to, but which loyal fans will likely want to explore at some point in order to better comprehend all that followed". Ronald Ziegler of the German Horrible Eyes fanzine described the album's sound as "very Swedish, very Death Metalish". According to Rivadavia, the second album Casus Luciferi sounds less Norwegian and more Swedish than earlier efforts. Sworn to the Dark "adds a lot of really catchy and melodic riffs and some cool guitar counter-melodies" to "droning guitars and frantic blast beats"; the vocals "fall somewhere in between black and death metal. They are raw and aggressive, but still understandable." Rivadavia called "Storm of the Antichrist" "a perfect balance between Venom or Darkthrone's outright savagery and straightforward execution, and Emperor's spiraling arrangements and progressive orientation" and pointed out their "greater appreciation for different forms of heavy metal, far beyond black metal's often tiresomely stubborn 'f*ck everyone else' mindset" as shown in the "thrash-like speed-picking" of "Underneath the Cenotaph", the "magnificently dense, almost Opeth-like riffs" introducing "The Serpent's Chalice" and "the Iron Maiden-quoting bassline" at the end of "The Light That Burns the Sun". Thomas Gabriel Fischer of Triptykon, whose former band Celtic Frost toured with Watain in 2007, compared them to his old band Hellhammer "in a totally positive manner. Watain approach their music with a certain level of respect, and a certain level of mystique. What they are doing is not just a performance; it goes much deeper than that. That reminds me so much of the good sides of Hellhammer."

According to Danielsson, Lawless Darkness is based more upon Watain themselves than other bands and was compared to Bathory, Master's Hammer, Fields of the Nephilim and Deep Purple. Despite their progression, they were still "retaining some cardboard-sounding drumbeats in honor of lo-fi pioneers like Venom and Bathory" as well as using "Emperor-worthy melodies". Rock Hard journalist Götz Kühnemund compared the album to old Rainbow and Dio-era Black Sabbath due to the atmosphere, as well as to Bathory's more epic releases.

Watain identify themselves as theistic Satanists. All lyrics, unless contributed by members of other bands, are written by vocalist Erik Danielsson, who summed up their topics as "the religion they are based upon, Satanism, or – to avoid confusion – Devilworship". Danielsson believes that a belief system shared by all members "is a must in order to do something as intimate and personal as music". Watain supports the Satanic order Misanthropic Luciferian Order.

In 2006, members of the band did the Hitler salute and wore T-shirts of the NSBM band Absurd after their gig on German Party.San Open Air. Asked about this incident in an interview to the German online metal magazine Metal.de, Erik Danielsson replied that calling them Nazis was the only way such people were able to deal with a black wolf entering a "herd of white sheep". When asked about his views on NSBM, he explained that "NSBM is a joke, a despaired approach of people who're incapable to comprehend the perversion and the insanity of Black Metal. They're trying to appear extreme and limit their selves in their conception to that kind of society, which describes something that we wouldn't care less about. Fuck the world! Black Metal doesn't have anything to do with the world like you know it." The band have publicly distanced themselves from, and openly criticised, Antisemitism and far-right ideologies, describing these as "one of the greatest evils that people today know". In an interview for American webzine Invisible Oranges, Danielsson said that "That is the one thing you cannot glorify. The Anti-Semitic and right-wing conservative connections that people have long accused black metal to be a platform for have very little to do with what we stand for. To me, it should be quite obvious that we would have been some of the first people to be executed in the Third Reich with the whole idea of the National Socialists being based upon a kingdom of bright-eyed little Aryans, and we are quite honestly the very opposite of that. [Laughs] There's an extremely important line to draw there, and I've realized that that's the only devil that people know these days." He explicitly rejected "racial ideas" as "irrelevant", saying that "I study other cultures, and I am very interested in radical ideas of viewing the world, but when it comes to racial ideas, I've never really found a speech or text about it that could make sense to me. When we view the world from a spiritual perspective, racial ideas become very mundane, and they become very insignificant. We are talking about an animal that developed into man and that is, to me, where my primary enemy lies. Not in any specific kind of that animal. We are all that animal, and I am completely uninterested in any ideas contrary to that, to be honest."

Watain's guitarist Pelle Forsberg was denied entry into the United States when the band arrived to perform with Morbid Angel. The guitarist later blamed it on changes in immigration policy.

== Live performances and allegations of animal abuse ==
Watain has been known to perform live using candles, pyrotechnics, and, akin to numerous black metal acts, limbs and bones of animal carcasses. The band gained notoriety doing this and even dousing audience members with animal blood (which is part of the normal Watain Ritual) in a show at the Brooklyn Night Bazaar in 2014, reportedly causing some attendees to vomit. This soon garnered attention on TMZ.

The band's members are alleged to have killed pigeons and even attempted to buy dogs from the homeless as a source of blood for their concerts. Erik Danielsson has hinted at doing so in several interviews but denied doing so in 2013.

On 7 March 2019, the band's concert in Singapore was canceled hours before the event was set to happen. This was authorised by the Info-communications Media Development Authority due to security concerns related to their lyrical content and previous concert events.

== Members ==
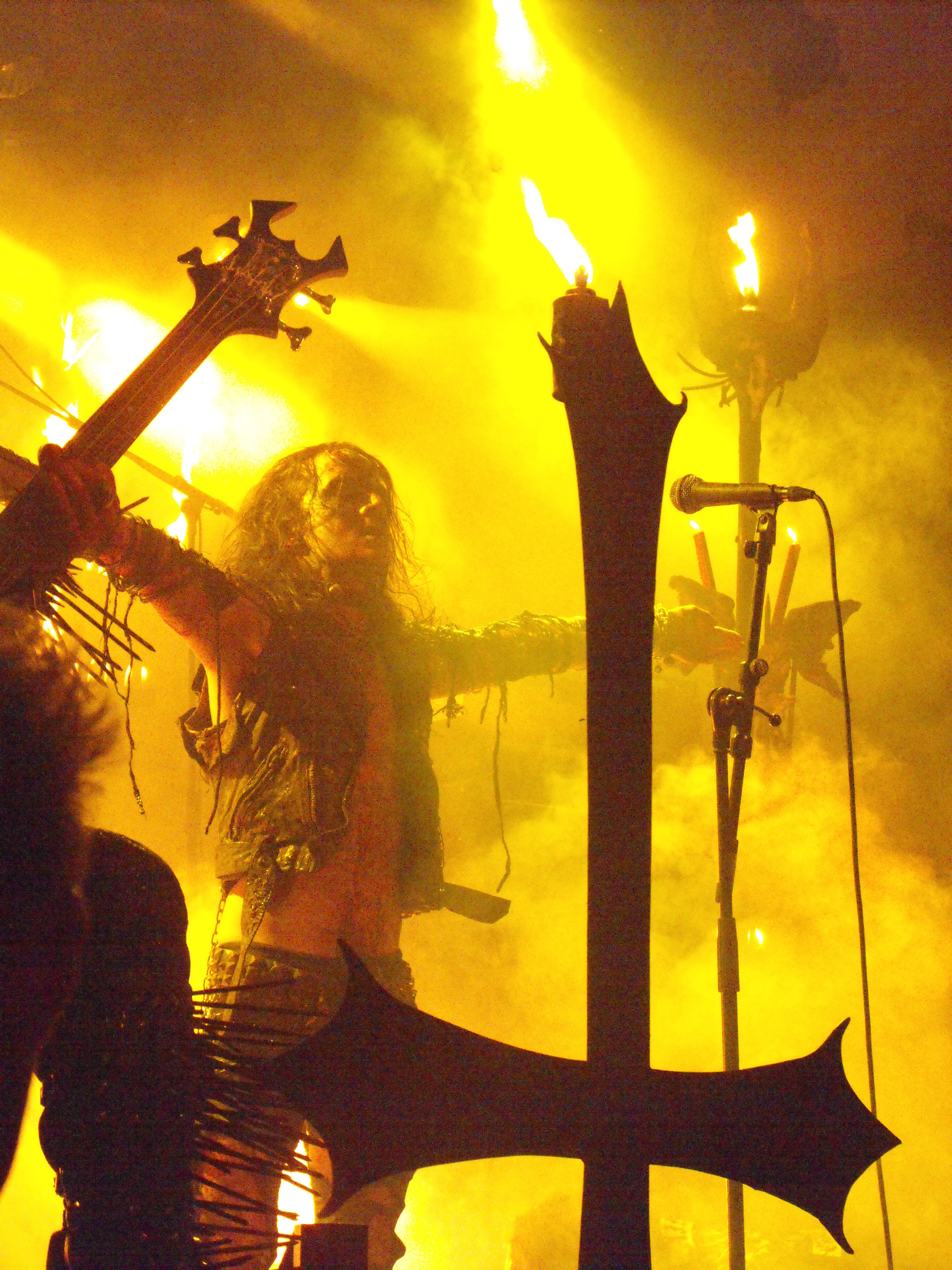
Watain performing at Hole in the Sky 2010

=== Current members ===
- Erik Danielsson a.k.a. E. – vocals, bass (1998–present)
- Håkan Jonsson a.k.a. H. – drums (1998–present; not touring 2015–present)
- Pelle Forsberg a.k.a. P. – guitars (1998–present)

=== Live members ===
- Alvaro Lillo – bass (2007–present), guitars (2019)
- H. Death (Hampus Eriksson) – guitars (2008, 2013, 2014, 2015–present)
- E. Forcas (Emil Svensson) – drums (2015–present)

=== Former members ===
- Christian "Crippe" Blom a.k.a. C. – guitars (1998–2000)
- John Sjölin a.k.a. John Doe – live guitar (2000–2001)
- Necromorbus (Tore Stjerna) – session bass, live guitar (2000–2002)
- Ynas "Mörk" Lindskog a.k.a. Y. – live bass (2001–2006)
- Selim Lemouchi a.k.a. S.L. – live guitar (2010, 2012; died 2014)
- Gottfrid Åhman – live guitar (2013)
- Set Teitan (Davide Totaro) – live guitar (2007–2018)

== Discography ==
=== Studio albums ===
Year	Title	Peak chart positions						
Year	Title	SWE	BEL	FIN	FRA	GER	SWI	US
2000	Rabid Death's Curse: Date: 2000; Label: Drakkar Productions	—	—	—	—	—	—	—
2003	Casus Luciferi: Date: 17 November 2003; Label: Drakkar Productions	—	—	—	—	—	—	—
2007	Sworn to the Dark: Date: 19 February 2007; Label: Season of Mist	—	—	—	—	—	—	—
2010	Lawless Darkness: Date: 7 June 2010; Label: Season of Mist	26	—	—	—	—	—	—
2013	The Wild Hunt: Date: 19 August 2013; Label: Century Media	1	132	25	164	18	73	158
2018	Trident Wolf Eclipse: Date: 5 January 2018; Label: Century Media	3	76	27	—	6	38	—
2022	The Agony & Ecstasy of Watain: Date: 29 April 2022; Label: Nuclear Blast	6	172	20	—	9	18	—
2028	TBD: Date: 20 September 2028; Label: TBD	—	—	—	—	—	—	—
"—" denotes a release that did not chart.

On 16 October 2015, Season of Mist re-released the first four studio albums as a box set entitled Satanic Deathnoise from the Beyond.

=== Live albums ===
Year	Title	Peak chart positions
Year	Title	SWE
1999	Black Metal Sacrifice: Data: 8 February 1999; Label: Independent	—
2001	The Ritual Macabre: Data: 2001; Label: Sakreligious Warfare Productions	—
2015	Tonight We Raise Our Cups and Toast in Angels Blood: A Tribute to Bathory: Date: 23 February 2015; Label: Sound Pollution; Format: 12" vinyl (33⅓ RPM)	2
2023	Die in Fire – Live in Hell (Agony and Ecstasy Over Stockholm): Date: 3 November 2023; Label: Nuclear Blast; Format: CD, vinyl, cassette, digital	21

=== EPs ===
Year	Title
1999	The Essence of Black Purity: Data: October 1999; Label: Grim Rune
2001	The Misanthropic Ceremonies (split with Diabolicum): Date: 25 February 2001; Label: Spikekult Rekords
2016	Sathanas / Luciferi Tour EP (split with Mayhem): Date: December 2016; Label: His Master's Noise

=== Video albums ===
Year	Title	Peak chart positions	
Year	Title	SWE	FIN
2012	Opus Diaboli – 13 Years of Black Metal Magic: Date: 7 May 2012; Label: His Master's Noise	1	4

=== Singles ===
Year	Title	Certifications (sales thresholds)	Album
2010	"Reaping Death"	SWE: Gold	Lawless Darkness
2013	"All That May Bleed"		The Wild Hunt
2013	"Fuck Off, We Murder" (GG Allin cover)		non-album single
2017	"Nuclear Alchemy"		Trident Wolf Eclipse
2022	"The Howling"		The Agony & Ecstasy of Watain

=== Demos ===
Year	Title
1998	Go Fuck Your Jewish "God" (pl)
2002	Promo 2002
2002	Puzzles ov Flesh
2020	Corona Mortis

=== Music videos ===
Year	Title	Director	Album
2013	"Outlaw"	Watain, Johan Bååth	The Wild Hunt
2017	"Nuclear Alchemy"	Claudio Marino, Artax Film	Trident Wolf Eclipse
2022	"The Howling"	Claudio Marino, Artax Film	The Agony & Ecstasy of Watain
2022	"We Remain"	Johan Bååth	The Agony & Ecstasy of Watain
