= Lawless Darkness =

Studio album by Watain
- Released: 7 June 2010
- Recorded: January–February 2010
- Studio: Necromorbus Studios in Alvik, Sweden
- Genre: Black metal
- Length: 73:28
- Label: Season of Mist
- Producer: Tore Stjerna, Watain

Watain chronology
| Sworn to the Dark (2007) | Lawless Darkness (2010) | The Wild Hunt (2013) |

Singles from Lawless Darkness
- 1. "Reaping Death" Released: 6 April 2010

Lawless Darkness is the fourth studio album by Swedish black metal band Watain, released through Season of Mist, on 7 June 2010. The cover art was made by Zbigniew M. Bielak, who also painted The Wild Hunt cover art. The album sold around 1,000 copies in the United States in the first week of its release, reaching no. 42 on the Top New Artist Albums (Heatseekers) chart. The single "Reaping Death" was distributed in their home country of Sweden in the Sweden Rock magazine, and was certified gold in the band's home country on 21 April by the International Federation of the Phonographic Industry for sales in excess of 10,000 copies. The album received positive reviews from music critics, and in 2011 the band were awarded the Swedish Grammi for 'Best Hard Rock' album for Lawless Darkness.

== Writing, composition ==
In regards to the album's title, Erik Danielsson said that "It's an expression about liberating all bonds. To question everything around you, to break down all barriers that are around you. Some call it salvation and others liberation. Lawlessness can mean liberation." Danielsson has also explained that he sees the band's previous album as the "foundation stone" of Lawless Darkness, "because with Sworn we had finally reached the artistic self-knowledge required for such a giant of an album. With that in our backs, we knew we could venture far into the dark… And we did." He described the album as a "thorough musical exploration of the darkside", and explained that the album's lyrics are based on the "exploration, glorification and adoration of the Devil; the eternal adversary and enemy of the world as we know it." Expanding on the meaning behind the album, he said:

The idea of Lawless Darkness is based upon the thought that light is an impulse of restriction and definition. Darkness, in turn, is the absence of light, and therefore the absence of the same restrictions. Note that Darkness in this context is also used as a spiritual and archetypal concept, not only the physical absence of light during, for example, night-time. The darkness that we refer to is the primordial wellspring of Chaos that is the abode of our gods, and unto which their children, the bloodline of fire, shall return.

== Recording and production ==
According to Danielsson, the album was recorded over a period of about two months (January–February 2010), and has described it as " a rather intense and chaotic two months, working every day and every night for sixty days in a row with the exception of one, I think." The album was again produced by Tore Stjerna, with whom the band has worked on all of their previous and subsequent albums. Danielsson has described working with Tore Sjterna as a "tradition" for Watain that has made the band what it is. "Why change a beneficial concept? There are numerous advantages with recording there, but the number one is probably that Tore is almost like member when we record, we know each other very well for many, many years, which is of course beneficial when doing something as intimate as an album recording. Watain is a special band, complicated in many ways, and Tore is one of the few persons that we have no problems working with."

== Artwork and packaging ==
Lawless Darkness digipak cover

The artwork for the album was handled by Zbigniew M. Bielak. Danielsson explained that working with him made things much easier as it helped them realise their ideas. He said that "We sent him long letters and talked a lot on the phone describing in detail the symbolism and idea behind every song. Meticulous descriptions of symbols, myth, ancient lore, magical work, everything that we needed to have woven into the artwork. He was surprisingly understanding of our cause and goals." Within the booklet, each song has original artwork by Bielak.

1,000 copies of a collector's edition of the album were available on the album's release. This boxset contained the digipak version of Lawless Darkness, which includes the Death SS cover 'Chains of Death'. The box also contains a Watain symbol pendant with chain, a black candle in wrapping, a full colour flag and 10 tarot cards in a pocket, which have been specially designed (one for each song) by Erik Danielsson. This was packed in a solid beech box with real leather and a Watain logo imprint on the lid. Invisible Oranges named it as one of the best metal album covers of 2010. Watain wanted listeners to have a "special" and "ritualistic" listening experience.

== Touring ==
In support of the album, Watain toured North America through November to December 2010 with the support of Black Anvil and Withered. Though it was originally intended to be a co-headline tour with Behemoth, Behemoth dropped out due to vocalist/guitarist Nergal needing to be urgently admitted to hospital for treatment of his leukaemia. The tour went ahead with Watain as the headlining act and included dates in Quebec, Washington, California, Texas, and New York. The tour was titled 'The Lawless States of Heretika Tour'. In February and March 2011, the band toured across Europe with Shining and Aosoth on the 'Death Holy Death Tour 2011'. This tour included shows in Denmark, Poland, France, Spain, as well as a five UK dates.

== Reception ==
=== Critical reception ===
Professional ratings
Review scores
| Source | Rating |
|---|---|
| About.com | 4/5 stars |
| AllMusic | 4/5 stars |
| Metal Storm | 8.3/10 stars |
| Pitchfork | (6.2/10) |
| Revolver | Favorable |

The album received generally positive reviews from music critics. According to Eduardo Rivadavia, writing for AllMusic, "Lawless Darkness is black metal through and through, and Watain even make a point of retaining some cardboard-sounding drumbeats in honor of lo-fi pioneers like Venom and Bathory, ferchrissakes! This is why purists looking for their fix need only look to the pulverizing fury unleashed by 'Death's Cold Dark', 'Total Funeral', and 'Kiss of Death', or the Emperor-worthy melodies swirling madly across 'Hymn to Qayin', or the majestic glacial desolation of 'Malfeitor' and the instrumental title track. Finally, there's the ultimate swan dive into the abyss that is the 15-minute-long, all-encompassing 'Waters of Ain', which feels like a mini-album unto itself, and casts a blinding spotlight upon the full scale of Watain's latest, significant achievement for the advancement of black metal's cause."

About.com called the album "Epic black metal that doesn't come off as over-indulgent" and "an accumulation of everything Watain has done on the past three albums". Pitchfork was slightly less favorable to the album, though still positive on the whole. Comparing it to Watain's previous album Sworn to the Dark, Pitchfork's Tom Breihan criticised the production, writing that "the cleaner production feels more compressed and less immersive, like they're attempting to bludgeon you with sheer loudness rather than suck you into their universe". However, Breihan finished his review by saying "Still, judged on its own merits, this is pretty powerful stuff. Occasionally, the band hits levels of all-out ferocity so absurd that they actually sound pretty. Danielsson has a truly great black-metal voice, a ravaged and demonic back-of-the-throat gargle that only occasionally says anything I can decipher ('Rivers of blood! Rivers of blood!'). When they chant, 'Hail! Beelzebub!' on 'Four Thrones', they sound like they mean it, which somehow makes the whole thing more fun. These freaks still know what they're doing, even if they're just treading bloody water this time around."

=== Accolades ===
The album was awarded the 2011 Swedish Grammi for 'Best Hard Rock' album. The album was named album of the year by Sweden Rock magazine, and the second best album of 2010 by Decibel, as well as artist of the year in the Terrorizer reader poll. About.com named it the 13th best metal album of 2010. The AllMusic staff named it as one of their favourite metal albums of 2010, describing it as one of the year's best albums in a strong year for extreme metal. Stereogum named it the 11th best metal album of 2010. The A.V. Club gave it the title 'Just Don't Give A Fuck Award For 2010', writing that "The Swedish black metal provocateurs that make up Watain have built a career on pissing off fans, the press, and anyone else that happens to be paying attention. But the band's not some talentless collective of media hackers: It backs its headache-inducing behavior with raw, savage, cutting-edge black metal, throwing in thrash, punk, and death elements just to keep things interesting." A variety of prominent musicians in metal also called it as one of the best albums of 2010, including Tomas Lindberg, Frederic Leclerq, and Adam Pierce (All Shall Perish).

== Track listing ==
All lyrics are written by Erik Danielsson except where noted; all music is composed by Watain.

| No. | Title | Length |
|---|---|---|
| 1. | "Death's Cold Dark" | 5:29 |
| 2. | "Malfeitor" | 6:58 |
| 3. | "Reaping Death" | 5:07 |
| 4. | "Four Thrones" | 6:16 |
| 5. | "Wolves Curse" | 9:12 |
| 6. | "Lawless Darkness" (instrumental) | 6:08 |
| 7. | "Total Funeral" (Lyrics by Pete Helmkamp) | 6:04 |
| 8. | "Hymn to Qayin" (Lyrics by Set Teitan) | 5:57 |
| 9. | "Kiss of Death" | 7:46 |
| 10. | "Waters of Ain" | 14:31 |
| Total length: | | 73:28 |

Limited edition digipak
| No. | Title | Length |
|---|---|---|
| 11. | "Chains of Death" (Death SS cover) | 6:14 |

== Personnel ==
- Erik Danielsson – lead vocals, bass
- Håkan Jonsson – drums
- Pelle Forsberg – guitar
- Set Teitan – lyrics on "Hymn to Qayin"
- Pete Helmkamp (Angelcorpse) – lyrics on "Total Funeral"
- Carl McCoy – vocals at the ending of "Waters of Ain"
- SL/TDB/AO (Selim Lemouchi) – guitar solos on "Waters of Ain" & "Lawless Darkness"
