= Sworn to the Dark =

Studio album by Watain
- Released: 19 February 2007
- Genre: Black metal
- Length: 57:42
- Labels: Season of Mist; Southern Lord (SUNN72.5)
- Producers: Tore Stjerna, Watain

Watain chronology
Casus Luciferi (2003)	Sworn to the Dark (2007)	Lawless Darkness (2010)

Sworn to the Dark is the third studio album by Watain and was released on 19 February 2007 on Season of Mist. The album received very positive reviews from music critics and has been described as the band's "breakthrough" album. The song "Legions of the Black Light" is dedicated to Dissection's vocalist Jon Nödtveidt who committed suicide in 2006.

== Critical reception and accolades ==
Professional ratings
Review scores
Source	Rating
About.com	4/5 stars
AllMusic	4.5/5 stars
Blabbermouth.net	9/10 stars
Exclaim!	7/10 stars

The album received positive reviews from music critics. Chad Bowar of About.com called it "a sinister and forbidding dose of black metal". He went on to say, "You'll hear the droning guitars and frantic blast beats of black metal, but Watain adds a lot of really catchy and melodic riffs and some cool guitar countermelodies." He concluded his review saying, "This is a really well crafted album that's menacing, yet melodic." Eduardo Rivadavia of AllMusic gave the album 4.5 of 5 stars, saying that the band "achieve a perfect balance between Venom or Darkthrone's outright savagery and straightforward execution, and Emperor's spiraling arrangements and progressive orientation". He went on to say that "you'll definitely find more extreme, misanthropic, or adventurous black metal albums than Sworn to the Dark out there, but you'll be hard-pressed to find one more balanced or – and this may sound contradictory for nasty old black metal – enjoyable". Scott Alisoglu of Blabbermouth.net wrote that "Watain is a band concerned not with experimentation or genre-bending, just the creation of ripping black metal songs that burn a hole in the soul and leave a lasting impact on the psyche. It doesn't get much better." The album also made many end-of-year lists, as well. In Terrorizer's Secret History of Black Metal (issued in September 2009), it made the number 13 position on their list of "Black Metal's Top 40 Albums". The AllMusic stuff named it one of their favourite metal albums of 2007. In 2013, Decibel ranked Sworn to the Dark at number 27 on its list of the Top 100 Black Metal Albums of All Time.

== Track listing ==
All lyrics are written by Erik Danielsson, except where noted; all music is composed by Watain.

No.	Title	Length
1.	"Legions of the Black Light" (Lyrics by Set Teitan)	8:04
2.	"Satan's Hunger"	6:46
3.	"Withershins" (instrumental)	1:02
4.	"Storm of the Antichrist"	4:15
5.	"The Light That Burns the Sun"	7:04
6.	"Sworn to the Dark"	5:03
7.	"Underneath the Cenotaph"	4:12
8.	"The Serpent's Chalice"	6:42
9.	"Darkness and Death" (Lyrics by Michayah Belfagor)	4:13
10.	"Dead But Dreaming" (instrumental)	2:05
11.	"Stellarvore"	8:17
Total length:		57:45

== Personnel ==
=== Watain ===
- Erik Danielsson – vocals, bass
- Pelle Forsberg – guitar
- Håkan Jonsson – drums

=== Additional personnel ===
- Set Teitan – lyrics and guitar solo on "Legions of the Black Light"
- Peter Stjärnvind, Alvaro Lillo, Carlos Aguilar, Tobias Sidegård – guest vocals on "Stellarvore"
- Michayah Belfagor – lyrics of "Darkness and Death"
- Peter In de Betou – mastering
- Ketalodog (Timo Ketola) – artwork
- Erik "Tyrant" Gustavsson – photography
- Tore Stjerna – production, recording, mixing
