= The Ritual Macabre =

Live album by Watain
- Released: 2001
- Recorded: 31 October 2000, Belgium
- Genre: Black metal
- Length: 34:41
- Label: Sakreligious Warfare

Watain chronology
Rabid Death's Curse (2000)	The Ritual Macabre (2001)	The Misanthropic Ceremonies (2001)

The Ritual Macabre is the sixth release by the black metal band Watain. It is their second live album. The album was released in 2001 on Sakreligious Warfare Productions and was limited to 666 copies. "Transilvanian Hunger" is a cover of Darkthrone's song from the album of the same name.

== Track listing ==
All tracks are written by Watain, except where noted

No.	Title	Lyrics	Music	Length
1.	"Limb Crucifix"			6:24
2.	"Rabid Death's Curse"			5:21
3.	"Agony Fires"			5:39
4.	"My Fists Are Him"			4:37
5.	"Transilvanian Hunger"	Fenriz	Darkthrone	5:41
6.	"Walls of Life Ruptured"			4:17
7.	"On Horns Impaled"			2:42
Total length:				34:41
