= Tetragrammatical Astygmata =

Studio album by Averse Sefira
- Released: March 6, 2006
- Recorded: February 2005, Top Hat Studios (Austin)
- Genre: Black metal
- Label: Evil Horde Records (CD), The Ajna Offensive (Vinyl)
- Producer: Tore Stjerna

Averse Sefira chronology
Bestien in Engelsgestalt (split w/ Secrets of the Moon) (2003)	Tetragrammatical Astygmata (2006)	Advent Parallax (2008)

Tetragrammatical Astygmata is the third (fifth, counting live records) full-length studio release from the Austin-based black metal band Averse Sefira. It was the last of their albums to be released on an independent metal label; in 2006, the band would jump to Candlelight and release their label debut in 2008. Much like that disc, this is split into categories; tracks 1–3 are "Blood", tracks 4 and 5 are "Flesh", tracks 6 and 7 are "Death", and tracks 8–10 are "Earth".

== Track listing ==
- All Songs Written & Arranged By Averse Sefira.
1. "Exordium" 0:41
2. "Detonation" 5:31
3. "Cremation of Ideologies" 5:50
4. "Hierpphant Disgorging" 5:18
5. "Plagabraha" 3:10
6. "Helix In Audience" 8:13
7. "Mana Anima" 6:32
8. "Decapitation of Sigils" 4:53
9. "Transitive Annihilation" 5:06
10. "Sonance Inumberate" 5:16

== Personnel ==
=== Averse Sefira ===
- Sanguine Mapsama: Guitars, Vocal
- Lady Of The Evening Faces: Keyboards, Interludes & Effects
- Wrath Satahriel Diablous: Bass, Vocal Backing
- The Carcass: Drums, Percussion

=== Additional Personnel ===
- Tore "Necromorbus" Stjerna: Additional Vocals on "Detonation" & "Sonance Inumberate"

== Production ==
- Arranged By Averse Sefira.
- Produced, Recorded, Mixed & Mastered By Tore Stjerna
