= Advent Parallax =

Studio album by Averse Sefira
- Released: February 12, 2008
- Recorded: September 2007 at Top Hat Studios in Austin, Texas
- Genre: Black metal
- Length: 57:34
- Label: Candlelight (compact disc), The Ajna Offensive (vinyl)
- Producer: Tore Stjerna

Averse Sefira chronology
Tetragrammatical Astygmata (2005)	Advent Parallax (2008)

Professional ratings
Review scores
Source	Rating
Allmusic	3.5/5 stars

Advent Parallax is the fourth and final studio album released by American black metal band Averse Sefira. It was released on February 12, 2008, on Candelight Records, with a vinyl pressing by independent label The Ajna Offensive. Over the course of its eight tracks, it is divided into 4 sections, "Anoint" (tracks 1 & 2), "Alight" (tracks 3 & 4), "Align" (tracks 5 & 6) and "Shine" (tracks 7 & 8). The credits proudly state that "No keyboards were used in this recording."

== Track listing ==
- All songs written by Averse Sefira. (Copyright Abstract Sounds/Tanglade Music)
1. "Descension" – 7:05
2. "Séance In A Warrior's Memory" – 7:55
3. "Viral Kinesis" – 7:29
4. "Cognition Of Rebirth" – 6:28
5. "Serpent Recoil" – 5:39
6. "A Shower Of Idols" – 6:13
7. "Refractions Of An Exploded Singularity" – 9:03
8. "Vomitorium Angelis" – 7:28

== Personnel ==
=== Averse Sefira ===
- Sanguine Mapsama – guitars, vocal
- Wrath – bass, vocal
- Lady of the Evening Faces – effects
- The Carcass – drums, percussion

=== Additional musicians ===
- Ross Dolan (of the death metal band Immolation) – additional vocals

== Production ==
- Produced, Recorded, Mixed & Mastered by Tore Stjerna
