= Black Metal (disambiguation) =

Black Metal may refer to:

- Black metal, a subgenre of heavy metal music
- Black Metal (Dean Blunt album), 2014
- Black Metal (Venom album), 1982
  - "Black Metal", song from Venom's album
- Black Metal (comics) graphic novel by Rick Spears

== See also ==
- Black color in chemical coloring of metals
- "Black Metal ist Krieg", a 2001 song by Nargaroth
- "Black Metallic", a 1991 song by Catherine Wheel
- "Black Metal Sacrifice", a 1999 song by Watain
- Black Metalcore, part of the music genre Metalcore
- Black metaltail, a common species of bird
- Metal Black, album by Venom
