= Malign =

Malign may refer to

- Malignancy, the tendency of a medical condition to become progressively worse
- Malign (band), a Swedish black metal band
