= Reaping Death =

Single by Watain

from the album Lawless Darkness
- A-side: "Reaping Death"
- B-side: "The Return of Darkness & Evil"; "Chains of Death"
- Released: 6 April 2010
- Recorded: January–February 2010 at Necromorbus Studios in Alvik, Sweden
- Genre: Black metal
- Length: 5:20
- Label: Season of Mist
- Songwriter(s): Watain
- Producer(s): T. Stjerna

"Reaping Death" is a single by Swedish black metal band Watain from the album Lawless Darkness. "Reaping Death" was released as a CD single on 6 April 2010 and a 7-inch picture disc on 30 April.

== Background ==
In December 2009, Watain confirmed its appearance at Sweden Rock Festival and announced a tribute to Bathory as part of its performance on 12 June 2010. After the announcement, Watain were approached by Sweden Rock magazine to record a Bathory cover. In collaboration with Sweden Rock magazine and Season of Mist, Watain released a CD single that all subscribers of the magazine got with issue number 70. The CD single consists of "Reaping Death" and a cover of Bathory's "The Return of the Darkness and Evil". The 7-inch picture disc edition is limited to 1,300 copies and features, besides "Reaping Death", a cover of Death SS's "Chains of Death".

== Lyrics and meaning ==
At the presentation in Stockholm, Watain's frontman Erik Danielsson explained that "Reaping Death" is a song written as a tribute to Cain. Danielsson described Cain as the first murderer and Satanist, and said that through the murder of his brother Abel, Cain was also "the first to break the shackles of creation and went against the will of God. Therefore, Cain was pushed away and found his way to his true father, the serpent in the Garden of Eden, also known as Satan."

To openly praise Cain, his origin, his works and his offspring is something that never would have been possible, say 300 years ago. 300 years ago they tied people such as us up and burned them alive. Now we are awarded gold discs and praise in the media. This is an encouraging proof that this road is leading to hell. Through black metal we now have a forum, in which we, without being persecuted and tortured, can celebrate the ancient ruin forces, revolutions and the gods of total liberation, and thus give them additional force. This gold disc is proof that the genre as such is one to be reckoned with, and with fire, fanaticism and passion as the driving force, we intend to take it even further, deep down in still unexplored abysses.

== Reception ==
The CD single was certified gold in Sweden on 21 April 2010 by the International Federation of the Phonographic Industry for sales in excess of 10,000 copies.

Adrien Begrand of PopMatters in his review of Lawless Darkness pointed out that "'Reaping Death' approaches the simplicity of Immortal in the way the verses border on straight-up thrash metal, the pre-chorus riff reminiscent of early Celtic Frost as [Erik] Danielsson spouts his usual Satanic shtick in surprisingly effective cadences and rhyming schemes: 'Hail! Hail! Thou who makes the cosmos wail! / In anguish as we fuck the world / And sodomize the god that failed.'" In contrast, David E. Gehlke of Blistering.com stated that "'Reaping Death' upholds the bold and bloody angle of pure black metal."

== Track listing ==
=== CD ===
No.	Title	Writer(s)	Length
1.	"Reaping Death"	Watain	5:20
2.	"The Return of Darkness & Evil"	Quorthon	4:33

=== Vinyl ===
Side one
No.	Title	Writer(s)	Length
1.	"Reaping Death"	Watain	5:20

Side two
No.	Title	Writer(s)	Length
1.	"Chains of Death"	Death SS	4:33

== Personnel ==
- E. (Erik Danielsson) – bass, vocals
- P. (Pelle Forsberg) – guitar
- H. (Håkan Jonsson) – drums
- T. Stjerna – producer
