= Casus Luciferi =

Studio album by Watain
- Released: November 2003
- Recorded: 2002–2003, Necromorbus Studio, Sweden
- Genre: Black metal
- Length: 50:33
- Labels: Drakkar, Norma Evangelium Diaboli
- Producer: Tore Stjerna

Watain chronology
Rabid Death's Curse (2000)	Casus Luciferi (2003)	Sworn to the Dark (2007)

Casus Luciferi is the second studio album by the black metal band Watain. It was released in 2003 on Drakkar Productions. It was also released on limited edition vinyl by Norma Evangelium Diaboli and, in 2004, on tape by the Romanian label Mirgilus Siculorum. The album was remastered and reissued in October 2008 with a bonus track, a live cover of the song "Watain" by Von that the band is named after.

== Reception ==
Professional ratings
Review scores
Source	Rating
AllMusic	4.5/5 stars

According to Eduardo Rivadavia, writing for AllMusic, "[t]he career of Sweden's Watain took a major step forward with the release of 2003's second album, Casus Luciferi, which crystallized the sound that would elevate the band -- in tandem with reliably devastating concert rituals -- to the top of the global black metal bone pile." He stated that, with this album, Watain "exchang[ed] the Norwegian influences of prior efforts with a no less devilish blueprint delineated years earlier by seminal Swedish forefathers like Dissection, Marduk, and Dark Funeral." Rivadavia concluded his review saying, "one would be foolish to overlook any track on Casus Luciferi, such is the consistent quality maintained throughout this grand musical grimoire, brimming with power, majesty, and glorious ruin in the name of black metal, and paying testament to Watain's well-deserved ascension following its unveiling."

In 2013, Decibel ranked Casus Luciferi at number 67 on its list of the Top 100 Black Metal Albums of All Time.

== Track listing ==
All lyrics are written by Erik Danielsson, except where noted; all music is composed by Watain.

No.	Title	Length
1.	"Devil's Blood" (Chorus by Dave Lepard)	5:49
2.	"Black Salvation"	6:45
3.	"Opus Dei (The Morbid Angel)" (Lyrics by Tore Stjerna of Funeral Mist)	5:33
4.	"Puzzles ov Flesh" (Lyrics by MkM of Antaeus)	5:39
5.	"I Am the Earth"	6:00
6.	"The Golden Horns of Darash" (Lyrics by Scorn of Katharsis)	5:41
7.	"From the Pulpits of Abomination"	6:34
8.	"Casus Luciferi"	8:32
9.	"Watain (Von cover)" (Bonus track on the limited edition)	2:47

== Personnel ==
- E. (a.k.a. Erik Danielsson) – vocals, bass (Curses & Bass of Doom)
- P. (a.k.a. Pelle Forsberg) – guitars (Darkness)
- H. (a.k.a. H. Jonsson) – drums, percussion (Chains)

== Production ==
- Arranged by Watain
- Produced, recorded, engineered, mixed and mastered by Tore Stjerna
