= Devilry =

EP by Funeral Mist
- Released: 1998
- Recorded: October 1997, January 1998 at Necromorbus Studio
- Genre: Black metal
- Length: 20:48
- Label: Shadow Records
- Producer: Necromorbus

Funeral Mist chronology
Havoc (1996)	Devilry (1998)	Salvation (2003)

Devilry is an EP by the Swedish black metal band Funeral Mist. It was released in 1998.

== History ==
Arioch and Necromorbus recorded Devilry at Necromorbus Studio in late October 1997 and January 1998. The EP was released through Shadow Records in summer 1998 in CD format, followed by the vinyl version.

In 2005 Norma Evangelium Diaboli reissued the EP and included the band's 1996 demo Havoc as bonus tracks.

== Musical style and ideology ==
Dr. Rape, who contributed a Funeral Mist interview to the Norwegian Slayer fanzine, described the musical style as "extremely fast and brutal Black Metal (like it should be!)", Arioch described it as "[v]ery fast, intense and violent Black Metal with extremely sick and perverted elements. Very far from the regular Black Metal sound. An orgy in religious maliciousness in its most extreme form." The only released lyrics are those to "Bringer of Terror", that deal with the return of Satan once "[t]he chains that held him are smashed", and the failure of the "wretch you call god". According to Arioch, the idea "that it is the voice or the sound and style of the music that decides if it's Black Metal or not […] is […] WRONG!!! […] A band that claims to play Black Metal must always have Satanism and nothing but Satanism as the highest priority in their music and concept as well as in their personal lives […]."

The CD's tray card features a "very provocative line: 'BY SUPPORTING BLACK METAL YOU SUPPORT THE GLORIFICATION OF RAPE, INCEST, WAR, MURDER, DRUGS, OPPRESSION, FASCISM, CORRUPTION ETC. THINK TWICE BEFORE BUYING THIS DIVINE PIECE OF ART!!!!'" When asked whether he stands behind this statement, Arioch stated that he "would never had it included in the lay-out" if the band did not stand behind "these things that are mentioned in this statement," which he called "the true face of today's incarnation of Evil" and "[g]enuine bringers of devastation and human suffering, which of course are an important part of the true Satanist way of life". This statement was also quoted by Niall Scott in his article on confession and absolution in the black metal context, released in Nicola Masciandaro's Hideous Gnosis: Black Metal Theory Symposium I.

== Track listing ==
1. "The Devil's Emissary" – 04:08
2. "Bringer of Terror" – 03:50
3. "Nightside Phantom" – 03:46
4. "Funeral Mist" – 05:01
5. "The God Supreme" – 04:03

The vinyl version includes the bonus track "Hellspell 2" (04:45).

== Personnel ==
- Arioch - electric guitar, bass guitar, vocals
- Necromorbus - drums
