= Malign (band) =

Swedish black metal band

- Origin: Spånga, Sweden
- Genres: Black metal
- Years active: 1994–present
- Labels: Pounding Metal Productions; Shadow Records; End All Life Productions; Norma Evangelium Diaboli
- Members: Nord; Mörk; Intet
- Past members: Fog; Vonda; Mist; Evig

Malign is a Swedish black metal band from Stockholm, formed in 1994.

== History ==
Malign was founded by Nord and Mörk, and released an untitled demo in 1995, followed by a live cassette released by Pounding Metal Productions in 1996.

In 1998, Shadow Records released Malign's 7” single Fireborn. In 1999, the band played on a show together with Watain and Dark Funeral, organised by Watain and Grim Rune Productions. A split LP with Watain was planned in the early 2000s and supposed to be issued by Grim Rune Productions before the recording of Watain's second album Casus Luciferi, but never got released. Malign's last recording was the Divine Facing 10", released by End All Life Productions in 2002 and re-released with the Fireborn tracks on CD as Divine Facing + Fireborn on CD in 2005 by Norma Evangelium Diaboli.

Ynas "Mörk"/"Mörkkh" Lindskog was a live member of Watain from 2001 to 2006 and contributed the lyrics to Låt oss ta allt från varandra to Shining's fifth album V – Halmstad in 2007. Nord was involved with Ofermod.

In autumn 2011, Norma Evangelium Diaboli announced a re-release of Divine Facing + Fireborn on LP and the band's first concert in twelve years, on November 4, 2011, supporting Watain and The Devil's Blood. The band used a session drummer and a session guitarist for the concert. Mörk stated that "Malign was never dead", but that he is "not even really certain who is in the band or not".

In 2015, a new line-up was unveiled along with the title-track from the band's upcoming EP, "A Sun To Scorch".

== Musical style, ideology and importance to the scene ==
Malign's music is influenced by Mayhem's music recorded before the death of leader and guitarist Euronymous, "which if you like it or not is what I consider to be the true Mayhem", as Mörk stated. He pointed out that he believes "Black Metal should be connected to Satanism and surely we consider to be a religious band", and considers himself a Devil worshipper.

Other black metal musicians have expressed high respect for Malign. MkM of Antaeus describes Malign as one of the black metal bands that "combine great musical work with strong ideology and are definitely among the most devoted individuals within the scene". On Ofermod's former home page, the band was considered to be, alongside Ofermod and Funeral Mist, "undeniable kings of the underground Black/Death Metal Cult", and according to Watain's vocalist E., the planned split LP was "basically meant to express our mutual respect for that indeed magnificent band's legacy, as well as to present some live material with a little better sound than on the live tape", referring to Watain's Black Metal Sacrifice cassette.

== Members ==
=== Current members ===
- Nord AKA N. Tengner - vocals
- Mörk AKA Mörkkh (Ynas Lindskog) - guitar, bass
- Intet - drums

=== Former members ===
- Fog - bass
- Vonda - guitar
- Mist - bass
- Evig - guitar
- E. - session drums on Divine Facing
- R. AKA Brother R - lyrics to Sinful Fleshspear

== Discography ==
- 1995 - Demo 1/95 (demo)
- 1996 - Live in Uppsala (demo)
- 1999 - Fireborn (7")
- 2002 - Divine Facing (10")
- 2005 - Divine Facing + Fireborn (CD, LP release in 2011)
- 2015 - A Sun to Scorch (EP)
