= Homecoming's March =

Studio album by Averse Sefira
- Released: 1999
- Recorded: September–October 1998
- Genre: Black metal
- Label: Arrogare Records (band created label for release of record); Evil Horde Records (Brazilian reissue, 2003); Mordor Records (Swedish reissue; 2007)
- Producer: Averse Sefira, Stuart Lawrence

Averse Sefira chronology
Homecoming's March (1999)	Battle's Clarion (2001)

Homecoming's March is the debut studio release by the Texan black metal band Averse Sefira. It was released in 1999 on the band's own label, Arrogare, and was produced by the band themselves with co-production by Stuart Lawrence (who would not figure in any of their other albums.

The album is split into band-composed full-length songs and joining those songs are interludes (or "aversions"), as created by "effect artist" Lady of the Evening Faces.

== Track listing ==
- All Music and Lyrics by Averse Sefira. (Copyright Averse Sefira)
1. "Hymns to the Scourge of Heaven" 8:29
2. "For We Have Always Been" 7:48
3. "Sentinel's Plight" 12:47
4. "Pax Dei" 8:04
5. "Above the Firmaments of Wrath 6:22
6. "Ad Infinitum" 6:41
7. "Homecoming's March" 13:45
- Note: The last track, "Homecoming's March" contains a hidden track called "Winter of My Bliss". Clocking in at a length of 6:10, it pushes the running time of the song to 13:45

== Personnel ==
=== Averse Sefira ===
- Sanguine Mapsama: Guitars, Vocals
- Wrath Satharial Diabolus: Bass, Percussion, Vocals
- Lady of the Evening Faces: Effects, Interludes
- Velock Gammaliel Maelstrom: Drums

=== Additional Personnel ===
- Chuck Salvo: Additional Vocals on track 4 ("respectfully dedicated to Immolation)

== Production ==
- Arranged by Averse Sefira
- Produced & Mixed by Averse Sefira & Stuart Lawrence
- Recording Engineer: Stuart Lawrence
- Mastered by Averse Sefira & Paul Connolly
