= Battle's Clarion =

Studio album by Averse Sefira
- Released: 2001
- Recorded: 2001 ("through will and arrogance at Isotopia Studios")
- Genre: Black metal
- Length: 34:59
- Label: Lost Disciple Records, Candlelight (2007 reissue)
- Producer: Averse Sefira

Averse Sefira chronology
Homecomings March (1999)	Battle's Clarion (2001)	Tetragrammatical Astygmata (2005)

Professional ratings
Review scores
Source	Rating
Kerrang!	4/5 stars

Battle's Clarion is the second full-length studio release from Texan black metal band Averse Sefira. Originally released by Lost Disciple in 2001, it was picked up and reissued by Candlelight in 2007 (Candelight being their label now).

== Track listing ==
- All Songs Written & Arranged By Averse Sefira.
1. "Battle's Clarion" 5:12
2. "Condemned to Glory" 4:30
3. "Withering, The Storm" (interlude) 2:03
4. "Deathymn" 5:18
5. "The Nascent Ones-The Age of Geburah" 5:18
6. "Argument Obscura" 5:44
7. "The Thousand Aeon Stare" 1:33
8. "Fallen Beneath the Earth" 3:52
9. "...Ablaze" 3:35

== Personnel ==
=== Averse Sefira ===
- Sanguine Asmodel Nocturne: Guitars, Vocals
- Lady Of The Evening Faces: Keyboards, Effects, Interludes
- Wrath Sathariel Diabolus: Bass, Vocals
- The Carcass: Drums

=== Additional Personnel ===
- MkM (of Antaeus), Lord Imperial: Additional Vocals on track 4

== Production ==
- Produced By Averse Sefira
- Recorded By Stuart Lawrence
- Mastered By Brendan Bigelow
