= Averse Sefira =

American music group

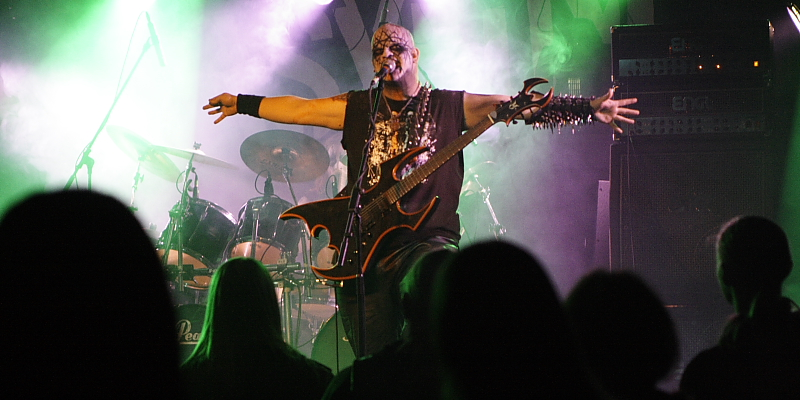
- Averse Sefira live in Birmingham, UK.

Background information
- Origin: Austin, Texas
- Genre: Black metal
- Years active: 1996–2012
- Label: Candlelight Records
- Members: Wrath Sathariel Diabolus; Sanguine Mapsama; The Carcass
- Past members: "Nuclear" Gregg Garbach
- Website: aversesefira.com

Averse Sefira was a black metal band from Austin, Texas.

== Biography ==
Averse Sefira was formed in 1996 by guitarist and vocalist Sanguine Mapsama and bassist Wrath Sathariel Diabolus. They released their demo, Blasphomet Sin Abset, later that year. It featured a drum machine as opposed to a live drummer. Three years later, their first album, Homecomings March, was released on Arrogare Records, their own label created to release that album. The band used a drum machine again. A remastered version of the album was released in 2003, with the interludes as separate tracks.

The band released a second album in 2001, Battle's Clarion. This album had a live drummer, The Carcass, previously a member of Death of Millions, and at one point a touring drummer for Incantation. This album took on a death metal influence reminiscent of early Deicide or Morbid Angel, though still identifiable as black metal.

After Battle's Clarion, the band toured internationally with bands such as Dark Funeral, Antaeus and Watain. The band gained a reputation for their live shows and gained a following in Europe and South America.

Four years after Battle's Clarion, the band recorded their third album, Tetragrammatical Astygmata. Necromorbus Studio provided the production. This album was a continuation of both Homecomings March and Battle's Clarion. A sense of harmonics similar to Immortal's Pure Holocaust aided in connecting the contemplative moments. Interludes were fewer than on previous works.

Advent Parallax was issued on February 25 by Candlelight Records, produced by Tore Stjerna (Necromorbus).

On May 3, 2012, Averse Sefira announced the end of the band. "It is over. The entity Averse Sefira has fractured back into its earthly parts, never to take wing again."

== Musical style and ideology ==
The band's early music was "stylistically most like early Mayhem and Gorgoroth". Around Battle's Clarion, they "explored a more death-oriented sound, and helped mold the style of the Texas outfit into something a bit more developed". On Advent Parallax, Averse Sefira "provide raw, scorching, bludgeoning black metal" with "hints of death metal on occasion, but black metal is the main ingredient -- and that means sinister-sounding rasp vocals […], thunderous blastbeats, and an ambience of total doom. One of the things that makes Advent Parallax effective is the fact that you can actually understand the lyrics that are coming out of Mapsama's mouth. So many black metal and death metal vocalists are difficult to understand, but Mapsama is quite understandable on pummeling tracks such as 'Viral Kinesis,' 'Serpent Recoil,' 'Cognition of Rebirth,' and 'Seance in a Warrior's Memory.' All things considered, this early-2008 release is a respectable, noteworthy example of an American band with a very Scandinavian-influenced sound" wrote Alex Henderson for AllMusic.

Sanguine has stated that as a Satanist, he finds it "somewhat insulting to see bands who write lyrics where every other word is 'SATAN!'", and Wrath Sathariel Diabolus disassociated himself from US death metal bands believing themselves to be black metallers because they use corpse paint and scream "Satan", pointing out that behind black metal, there is an idea first and not just strongly distorted guitars. Wrath named John Milton's Paradise Lost as a "great piece of literature" he gets inspiration from. He is also inspired by some magical, "particularly ones dealing with Enochian magick", and the Old Testament, "only because it portrays god and the angels as destructive and terrifying. I like that." Sanguine is inspired by the works of Arthur Edward Waite, William Blake and Charles Baudelaire. Referring to the 1990s NSBM trend, Wrath pointed out that Averse Sefira never had any link with Nazism; and Sanguine sees "it as somewhat contradictory that people are linking national-socialism and satanism together, although it seems that most of the NS bands are dumping their Satanic roots. Adopting National-Socialism seems like a last ditch shock tactic."

== Discography ==
=== Studio releases ===
- Homecoming's March - (1999)
- Battle's Clarion - (2001)
- Tetragrammatical Astygmata - (2005)
- Advent Parallax - (2008)

=== Live and compilation releases ===
- A Union in Blood - Live in Bordeaux (live, 2003)
- Bestien in Engelgestalt (split w/ Secrets of the Moon, 2003)

=== Demos and bootlegs ===
- Blasphomet Sin Abset (demo, 1996)
- Promotional Demo 1999 (demo, 1999)

== Band members ==
=== Current members ===
- Sanguine Mapsama - guitar, vocals
- Wrath Sathariel Diabolus - bass, backing vocals
- The Carcass - drums
- Lady of the Evening Faces - effects, "interludes", keyboards

=== Former members ===
- "Nuclear" Gregg Garbach - drums (1999–2000)
