= Satanic Blood Angel =

Compilation album by Von
- Released: 2003
- Recorded: 1991
- Genre: Black metal
- Length: 63:47
- Label: Nuclear War Now!

Von chronology
Satanic (1990)	Satanic Blood Angel (2003)	Satanic Blood (2012)

Satanic Blood Angel is the first compilation album by American black metal band Von. It features the Satanic Blood demo released in 1992, the unreleased Blood Angel demo and a live recording of a gig played in their home city, San Francisco, California. The compilation was released in 2003 by Nuclear War Now! Productions as a double CD and by From Beyond Productions as a single CD. Besides the Satanic, Blood Angel and Satanic Blood demos, Satanic Blood Angel is the only current licensed re-release of the Von demos compiled for sale, excluding Satanic.

== Track listing ==
CD 1 (tracks 1–8: Satanic Blood; tracks 9–14: Blood Angel)

1. "Devil Pig" – 2:23
2. "Veinen" – 2:26
3. "Watain" – 2:49
4. "Lamb" – 1:41
5. "Veadtuck" – 3:17
6. "Satanic Blood" – 2:05
7. "Christ Fire" – 2:56
8. "Von" – 2:25
9. "Evisc" – 1:56
10. "Release" – 1:18
11. "Blood Angel" – 1:27
12. "Chalice of Blood" – 4:06
13. "Vennt" – 2:16
14. "Backskin" – 3:21

CD 2 (live in San Francisco)

1. "Veinen" – 2:27
2. "Watain" – 3:02
3. "Lamb" – 1:34
4. "Evisc" – 1:59
5. "Release" – 1:20
6. "Satanic Blood" – 2:18
7. "Veadtuck" – 3:11
8. "Chalice of Blood" – 4:12
9. "Goat Christ" – 1:42
10. "Vennt" – 2:11
11. "Dissection Inhuman" – 2:27
12. "Von" – 2:58

== Personnel ==
- Goat – vocals, guitar, cover art
- Kill – bass
- Snake – drums
