= The Essence of Black Purity =

EP by Watain
- Released: October 1999
- Recorded: 1999, Necromorbus Studio
- Genre: Black metal
- Length: 7:14
- Label: Grim Rune

Watain chronology
Black Metal Sacrifice (1998)	The Essence of Black Purity (1999)	Rabid Death's Curse (2000)

The Essence of Black Purity is the third release by the black metal band Watain. It was released in 1999 on EP format on Grim Rune Records and was limited to 300 copies. Grim Rune website mentions that the EP "got a generally good response in the underground circuits." Similarly, Eduardo Rivadavia of AllMusic wrote that Watain "quickly gain[ed] underground credibility" with this "uncompromising 7" release".

When asked his opinion about Watain's older albums, vocalist Erik Danielsson said: "I appreciate them for what they are, monuments of what we were before, pieces of evolution. The rehearsal demo was just a primitive attempt though, but the 7" actually still makes me tremble at times. I accept it for being a debut release, yet I think that it's positive that it is not available anymore, since what we offer today is much closer to what we want WATAIN to be. It can be good to look back and remember at times, but now we are trying to focus on looking ahead on what [sic!] to come. One thing I really like about the 7" is the lyric to the title track, it still means a lot to me."

When asked if there is a possibility of re-releasing their early albums, Danielsson commented: "The old releases will stay what they are; monuments of the past, remembered by some, unnoticed by others. We do not intend to re-release any of these outputs, as we believe our new material is far more interesting. But who knows…" Danielsson also considers the EP their first official release and regards the two tracks "as magnificent pieces of black metal".

== Track listing ==
1. "On Horns Impaled" – 2:56
2. "The Essence of Black Purity" – 4:19
