= Secrets of the Moon =

German black metal band

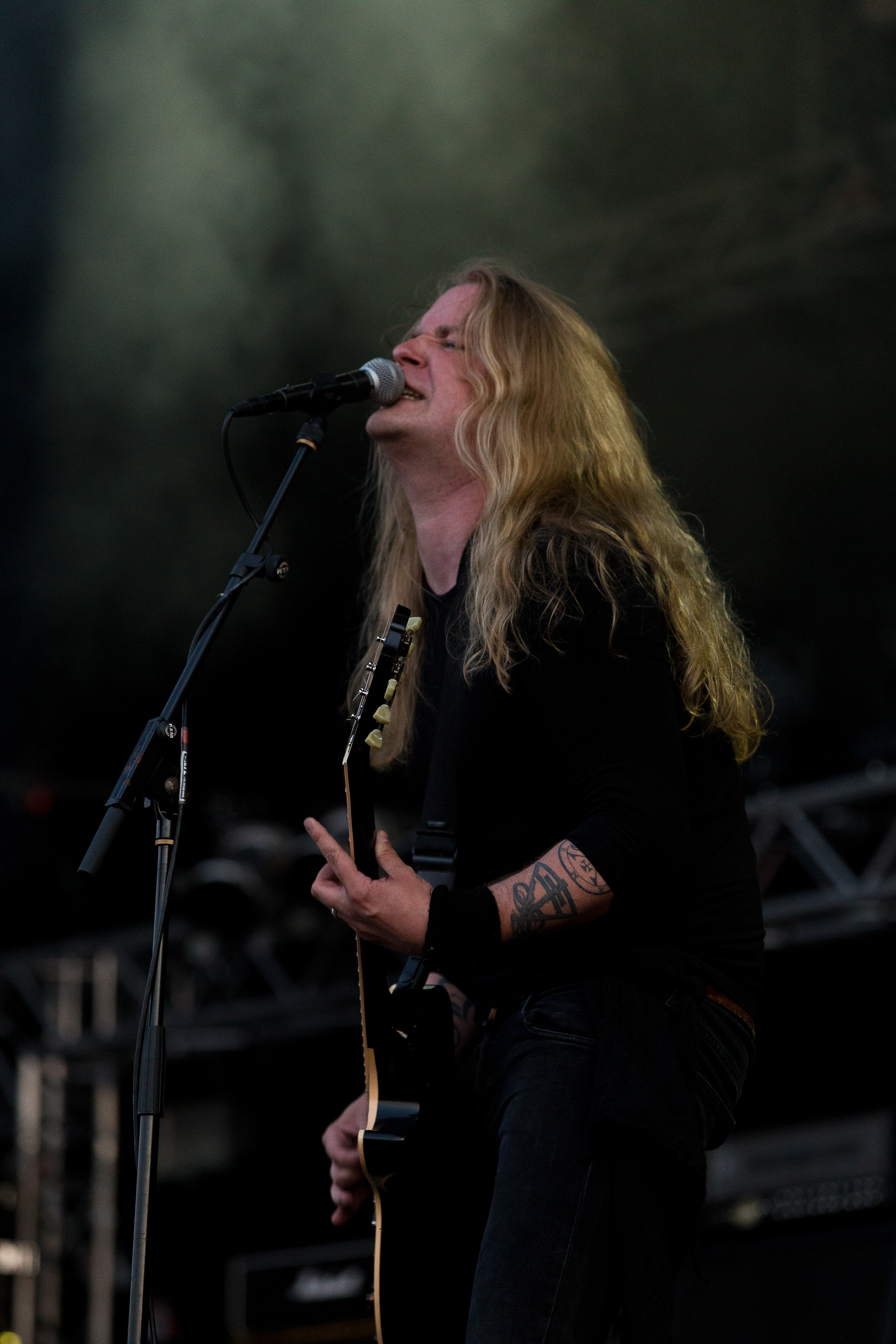
- Secrets of the Moon at Party.San Open Air 2015

Background information
- Origin: Osnabrück, Germany
- Genres: Black metal, doom metal
- Years active: 1995–2022
- Labels: Prophecy Productions, Lupus Lounge
- Members: sG; Erebor; Daevas; AR
- Past members: LSK (R.I.P. 2013); Thelema; Frazer (R.I.P. 2021); Schizo; Ohtar; A.D. Thrawn Thelemnar; K.S.A. Naamah Ash
- Website: www.secretsofthemoon.de

Secrets of the Moon were a black metal band from Osnabrück, Germany, founded in 1995.

== Biography ==
Secrets of the Moon were founded in 1995. After their first two demos they released a split with the German band Lunar Aurora. Thrawn, who knew the band since the first demo tape, met them the first time in 1997 and played with their vocalist and guitarist sG in another band, joined Secrets of the Moon in 2000 or 2001. Their debut Stronghold of the Inviolables was released in 2001 on LP only. It was rereleased on CD 2002 and 2010, the last re-release contains some bonus tracks of an unfinished album called Thelema Rising. In December 2001, Secrets of the Moon supported Godless North, Krieg and Inquisition on the North American Black Metal Invasion tour dates in Germany.

LSK (Antaeus, Hell Militia, Vorkreist) got to know Secrets of the Moon during their tour with her band Antaeus and joined them when their former bass player left in 2008.

In 2012 the band recorded Seven Bells, aided by Thomas Gabriel Fischer (Triptykon) and V. Santura (Dark Fortress, Triptykon). The album featured guest appearances by Ulf Theodor Schwadorf (The Vision Bleak, Empyrium), Kvohst (Dødheimsgard, Code, Hexvessel) and Morten Gass (Bohren & der Club of Gore). The band gave no interviews related to the album, refused to promote it and did not want their label to pay for advertising, because they did not want any "bought success". Their first interview since the release was given to German Rock Hard in 2013.

In 2022, the band announced their disbandment with a last live appearance in October of the same year.

== Musical style and ideology ==
Secrets of the Moon were called "the chameleons of black metal" in German Rock Hard magazine due to their style changes with every album. Although their style changed, Thrawn, who is one of their main songwriters, still has the same influences as when he started making music, like 1990s Swedish death metal. Their second album Carved in Stigmata Wounds, featuring fast as well as slow, doom metal-like passages with keyboards, was compared to Samael. Some parts on Privilegivm, which is more experimental and atmospheric and less accessible, are close to doom metal. Their fifth album Seven Bells is mostly in mid-tempo and reminiscent of Thomas Gabriel Fischer's music.

When asked to "sum up Secrets of the Moon's music" and what their music "is all about", Thrawn replied: "Darkness and death", and LSK added "experimentation". Thelemnar names "nature, darkness, Satan" as main influences and recommends to read Heinrich Cornelius Agrippa and Aleister Crowley, whose Gnostic Mass starts the album Carved in Stigmata Wounds. S. Golden also refers to Crowley, occultism and Satanism.

== Members ==
=== Current members ===
- Daevas - bass (1995–2008, 2017–2022), lead vocals (1995–2007)
- sG - guitars (1997–2022), lead vocals (2008–2022)
- AR - guitars (2009–2022)
- Erebor - drums (2014–2022)

=== Former members ===
- Schizo - guitars (1995–1996)
- Frazer - drums (1995–2001, died 2021)
- Thrawn Thelemnar - drums (2001–2014)
- Thelema - guitars (2001–2002)
- Ohtar - guitars (2003)
- A.D. - guitars (2004–2008)
- K.S.A. - guitars (2008–2009)
- LSK - bass (2008–2011; died 2013)
- Naamah Ash - bass (2011–2016)

== Discography ==
=== Demos ===
- Unearthed Arcana (Demo, 1995)
- Vanitas (Demo, 1997)

=== Split releases ===
- Auf einer Wanderung durch goldene Sphären (Split with Lunar Aurora, 1999)
- Black Metal Endsieg III (Split with Armagedda, Dark Storm and Bael, 2002)
- Bestien in Engelsgestalt (Split with Averse Sefira, 2003)

=== Albums ===
- Stronghold of the Inviolables (2001)
- Carved in Stigmata Wounds (2004)
- Antithesis (2006)
- Privilegivm (2009)
- Seven Bells (2012)
- Sun (2015)
- Black House (2020)

=== Contributions ===
- "Condemnation (of the Inferiority) (Unrel. Version)" on Jesus Wept / Black Arts comp #1 (2002)
- "The Protagonist" on Tribute to Dead Can Dance – The Lotus Eaters (with Nostalgia, 2004)

=== Singles and EPs ===
- The Exhibitions EP (EP, 2005)
- The Exhibitions EP (EP; Lupus Lounge)
- Them Bones / This Inner Soil (7", 2010)
- The Ambience of a Dead Star (12", 2010)
- Warhead (7", 2011)

=== Other ===
- De Musica Mundana (compilation, 2002)
- Live in Bitterfield 2001 (live, 2002)
