= Armagedda =

Swedish black metal band

- Also known as: Volkermord(1999)
- Origin: Norrland, Sweden
- Genre: Black metal
- Years active: 1999–2004, 2020
- Label: Agonia Records
- Spinoffs: Lönndom.
- Members: Graav, A.
- Past members: Necromorbus, Hor, Patrik Högberg, Roger Markström, Winterheart.

Armagedda is a Swedish black metal band founded in 1999.

By 2004 the band had split-up but reformed in 2020.

== History ==
Andreas Peterson formed Armagedda as Volkermord in early 2000. A few months later, Graav and Phycon joined the band. A rehearsal tape remained unreleased until 2008. The band entered the studio in mid-2000 to record the Volkermord demo, which had a grim and raw production. It was released in October, limited to 30 copies. This demo was to be released on MCD format, but postponed indefinitely. In 2001 they recorded their debut album, The Final War Approaching.

At this time, the band changed their name to Armagedda (Swedish for Armageddon), and recorded rehearsal tracks that appeared on the In Blackest Ruin split with Svarthymn, released through Deathcult Productions. Armagedda signed to Akhenaten's label Breath of Night Records for a CD release in 2002, with a vinyl LP version licensed to Sombre Records Germany. Mord joined Armagedda in early Summer of 2001 to complete the line-up. This lasted until 2004, when Graav and Peterson disbanded Armagedda and started Lönndom. The band stated,

"As you all may know, Armagedda will not bring you any future experiences. We decided after the release of Ond Spiritism that it was for the best to put this phenomenon of ours to the past, we felt that we had achieved everything we needed and seen in our dreams. To continue would have been a move in the wrong direction. Graav has chosen another path in life and is forever gone. But as certain as the end came hand in hand with Ond Spiritism a birth and beginning of something else grew in shape. However, that’s another story and it will speak for itself somewhere else...."

The band reformed in 2020 and released an album with the following statement: "And so it was told that in the seventeenth year, things that were thought to be dead begun to stir again in the earth, as if awoken by the stench of man-fear penetrating deep beyond the reach of sunlight. Reanimated by some nameless and cursed source of vitality they say it has begun pouring and trickling from the dark crevices of the North, like an ancient curse into the veins of the world. And with the same fearful fascination that we behold something full of life being robbed of its vitality and pulse, we shall now bear witness to that which ought to be forever dead but by unnatural impulse and eager invocation is again given life, to haunt and to stalk the night of the world."

== Primary members ==
- Graav – vocals, guitar
- Andreas Peterson – guitar, bass

=== Session members ===
- Roger Markström – drums
- Winterheart – drums
- Necromorbus – drums
- Hor – drums
- Patrik Högberg – bass

== Related bands ==
- LIK – A and Graav's black metal band.
- Lönndom – A and Graav's folk metal band.
- Leviathan – Former member Roger Markström's soloproject, with A on session-strings.
- Watain, Fucking Funeral, Bloodsoil, Dissection – E. Danielsson's bands.
- Demented – Patrik Högberg
- Maleficium – Roger Markström session drumming.
- Sterbend, Nyktalgia, Total Hate, Tairach, Krieg, Hunok, Flagellator, Kataplex, Misery Speaks – Winterheart

== Discography ==
- Volkermord (2000), Self-released – Demo
- In Blackest Ruin (2001), Split
- The Final War Approaching (2001), Album
- Armagedda / Woods of Infinity (2002), Split
- Black Metal Endsieg III (2002), Split
- Strength Through Torture (2002), EP
- Only True Believers (2003), Album
- In Blackest Ruin (2004), EP
- Ond Spiritism: Djæfvulens Skalder (2004), Album
- Echoes In Eternity (2007), Compilation
- I Am (2010), EP
- Live in Nurnberg (2012), Live DVD
- Svindeldjup ättestup (2020), Album
