= Satanic Blood =

Studio album by Von
- Released: October 31, 2012
- Recorded: The Pit (Litchfield Park, Arizona); Wall to Wall Studios (Chicago, Illinois)
- Genre: Black metal
- Length: 42:29
- Label: Von Records
- Producer: Jason Ventura

Von chronology
Satanic Blood Angel (2003)	Satanic Blood (2012)	Dark Gods: Seven Billion Slaves (2013)

Satanic Blood is the full-length debut album by American black metal band Von. It was released on October 31, 2012 via the band's own label, Von Records.

It is the band's first release since their hiatus in 1992 and subsequent reunion in 2010. The album mostly contains the reworked versions of songs in the band's 1992 demo, Satanic Blood. It does not feature the band's original vocalist and guitarist, Goat, who left the band just after the reunion.

== Critical reception ==
Professional ratings
Review scores
Source	Rating
MetalSucks	4/5 stars
Pitchfork	(5.0/10)

The album met with mixed to positive reviews. Sammy O'Hagar of MetalSucks gave the album a positive review and praised its raw sound and production. He also compared the album's sound to other notable second wave of black metal albums such as Transilvanian Hunger by Darkthrone and De Mysteriis Dom Sathanas by Mayhem. He also described the album's tempo as "mid-paced", in contrast to other black metal acts such as Satyricon, 1349 and Anaal Nathrakh. Venien's vocals were also likened to those of death metal, while the "rattling" guitar sound and noticeable basslines were noted. However, the reaction of Grayson Currin of Pitchfork Media was mixed. He criticized the album's lack of progression and Venien's "bastardization" of Von's legacy although he also complimented on the album's low-fidelity production, high-energy and enthusiasm. Death metal, grindcore and hardcore punk elements in the album were also noted.

In 2013, Decibel ranked the original demo version of Satanic Blood at number 34 on its list of the Top 100 Black Metal Albums of All Time.

== Track listing ==
All tracks are written by Shawn Calizo and Jason Ventura.

No.	Title	Length
1.	"Jesus Stain"	3:40
2.	"Devil Pig"	2:27
3.	"Venien"	2:21
4.	"Release"	1:07
5.	"Veadtuck"	3:08
6.	"Vennt"	1:47
7.	"Evisc"	1:30
8.	"Goat Christ"	1:27
9.	"Dissection InHuman"	3:55
10.	"Chalice of Blood"	3:31
11.	"Blood Von"	3:40
12.	"Christ Fire"	2:51
13.	"Backskin"	3:10
14.	"Watain"	2:41
15.	"Blood Angel"	1:09
16.	"Lamb"	1:29
17.	"Satanic Blood"	2:36
Total length:		42:29

== Personnel ==
Von

- Venien (Jason Ventura) – vocals, bass, composition, production, engineering
- JGiblete Cuervo (Lord Giblete) – guitar, backing vocals, engineering

Additional musicians

- Charlie Fell – drums
- Shawn Calizo (Goat) – composition

Other personnel

- Andrew Ragin – mixing, engineering
- John Gray – mastering
- Frank Caruso – engineering
