= Ofermod =

Swedish black/death metal band

- Origin: Norrköping, Sweden
- Genres: Black metal, death metal
- Years active: 1996–present
- Labels: Norma Evangelium Diaboli, The Ajna Offensive, Season of Mist, Spinefarm Records, Helter Skelter Productions, Shadow Records, Pounding Metal Productions
- Members: Michayah Belfagor; Rudra
- Past members: Shiva; Mist; Atum; Moloch; Nebiros Leviathan; J.K. S. Samuelsson

Ofermod is a Swedish black/death metal band, formed in 1996 by Mika 'Michayah Belfagor' Hakola.

== History ==
Nefandus drummer, backing vocalist and lyricist Mika "Belfagor" Hakola formed Ofermod in 1996. The band recorded the single "Mystérion Tés Anomias" in Tore "Necromorbus" Stjerna's Necromorbus studio in January 1998, and released it through Pounding Metal Productions. In 2000, Hakola retired from music to concentrate on occult studies and practices. This and the closure of Shadow Records led cancelling the band's debut album.

In 2003, Hakola started composing again in prison. In 2004, singer Nebiros joined him, and they recruited drummer Tore "Shiva" Stjerna, who had produced the Mystérion Tés Anomias single. After another prison sentence, Hakola contacted guitarist Atum, and through him, bassist Tehôm. In December 2004, the band recorded two songs for a Mystérion Tés Anomias re-release through Norma Evangelium Diaboli. Hakola used the pseudonym "Michayah", and Nebiros called himself Leviathan.

The band's first album, Pentagrammaton, which was supposed to feature Moloch of Teitanblood sharing vocals with Nebiros and "mark the ten year anniversary of OFERMOD" in 2006, was "partly finished in late 2005/early 2006", but delayed because Hakola "was sent to prison, for assault, robbery and a few other incidents, in early March 2006". He was released in August 2006, but sentenced to serve more time that year, "due to new acts of violence". Pentagrammaton was delayed until 2007. The album remained unreleased because "obviously the forces of chaos did not want this album to be released". Hakola reworked the material, which was produced by former Marduk bassist Magnus "Devo" Andersson, and released as Tiamtü in 2008.

The band released their second album, Thaumiel, in 2012, with singer and guitarist J. Kvarnbrink, aka "Tehôm", of Mortuus and Head of the Demon, replacing Nebiros, who left in 2011 to rejoin Malign, though he briefly rejoined the band in 2012 for some live performances, and produced at Endarker Studio by Magnus Andersson. By 2012, Ofermod had a new line-up, including bassist Robin "Rudra" Fjäll and drummer Simon Samuelsson. The band released their second EP, Serpents Dance, in 2014, and their third album, Sol Nox, in 2017.

Johannes Kvarnbrink departed the band after Sol Nox. According to Hakola, he left due to feeling he had achieved his potential and had nothing more to offer the band, even stating that the album was an unsurpassable masterpiece. From July 2017 until September 13, 2019, Hakola was the only member of the band left.

== Music and ideology ==
Ofermod are based on the forces of Sitra Achra. Belfagor claims to write the lyrics in connection with meditation and astral travels and composes the music in semi-trance. Belfagor tries to avoid being consciously influenced by other bands. Ofermod's musical style supposedly influenced other Swedish black metal bands such as Watain and Ondskapt. On Tiamtü, Ofermod "has eschewed breakneck speed for brutish, evocative music, which has far more technically in common with Death Metal than Black Metal". Their EP's style has been likened to bands such as Watain (whom Ofermod supposedly influenced), Dark Funeral (whom Belfagor called one of "the non-serious bands that use the Satanic thing as an image but actually have no idea of this phenomenon's esoteric aspects") and Gorgoroth by AllMusic journalist Eduardo Rivadavia. Marduk guitarist Morgan Håkansson, for whose album Wormwood Belfagor wrote the lyrics to "Phosphorous Redeemer", described their early music as "raw black metal", whereas the style on the Tiamtü album "include[s] some death metal, like a bit of MORBID ANGEL" (whose debut album, Altars of Madness, made a great impression upon Belfagor).

The band originally worshipped the Devil and termed the music "Orthodox Black Metal". The new tracks on the EP re-release were characterised as "Orthodox Death Metal", "for the band no longer use the word 'Satan' (ha-shatan) as a description of their religion, but leave the holiest essence of the Lord silent, as it forever should be, for it existed before the cosmos and eventually will bring to its primal form: No-Thing = Utter Spiritual Death". Yet Ofermod are still connected to Satanism; Belfagor stated that "our lyrics and most of all the presence conjured into our album in the process of making it is SATANIC in every way possible", and that he considers black metal and death metal to be "exactly the same, when it comes to the Cult, as it is the same satanic forces of Chaos we religiously devote ourselves to". The band refers especially to the Kabbalah and chaos as the dark counterpart to creation, which is seen as the true evil by Ofermod, but Belfagor also uses terms like evil for his own views, being evil from a cosmic perspective. According to Belfagor, "[t]he materialization of existence must and will be inverted, emanation by emanation, for it is a curse life has inflicted upon itself through manifestation".

== Line-up ==
Current members

- Mika Hakola - guitar (1996-) vocals (2022-)

Past members

- Mikael Schelin - bass
- Jonas Tengner - vocals (1997-2011, 2012, 2021-2022)
- Tore Gunnar Stjerna - drums (2004-2005)
- Johannes Kvarnbrink - bass (2004-2005) guitar, vocals (2012-2017)
- Karl Emil Lundin - guitar (2004-2005)
- Ignacio Muñoz - vocals (2005-2006)
- Robin Fjäll - bass (2012-2016, 2019-2021)
- Simon Samuelsson - drums (2012-2017)
- Joakim "Jocke" Wallgren - drums (2015)
- Kristoffer Andersson - guitar (2015)
- Lars Thomas Ulf Broddesson - drums
- Naldo Martinez - vocals (2019-2022)

== Discography ==
Albums

- Tiamtü (2008)
- Thaumiel (2012)
- Sol Nox (2017)
- Pentagrammaton (2020)
- Mysterium Iniquitatis (2021)
- Drakosophia (2025)

EPs

- Mystérion Tés Anomias (1998)
- Serpents Dance (2014)
- Black Metal Terror split with Malign, Triumphator, Watain (2019)
