= Rabid Death's Curse =

Studio album by Watain
- Released: December 2000
- Recorded: April 2000, Necromorbus Studios
- Genre: Black metal
- Length: 38:27
- Label: Drakkar, Norma Evangelium Diaboli & Season of Mist (for France), Apocalyptor (in Australia), Satanic Propaganda (for Sweden)
- Producer: Tore Stjerna

Watain chronology
The Essence of Black Purity (1999)	Rabid Death's Curse (2000)	Casus Luciferi (2003)

Alternative cover

Rabid Death's Curse is the first studio album by the black metal band Watain. It was released in 2000 on Drakkar Productions. It is notable as being the first and only album for which the band had two guitarists; from Rabid Death's Curse onwards, the band would be a trio. The song "Rabid Death's Curse" contains an audio sample from the film Friday the 13th. The album is considered a classic and was featured on German Rock Hard magazine's list 250 Black-Metal-Alben, die man kennen sollte ('250 black metal albums you should know').

== Musical style and lyrics ==
Ronald Ziegler of the German Horrible Eyes fanzine described the sound of Rabid Death's Curse as "very Swedish, very Death Metalish". According to Eduardo Rivadavia of AllMusic, the album "suggested that Watain were, at best, content to produce intentionally crude facsimiles of inspirational forefathers ranging from Bathory to Mayhem and, at worst, unable to do anything else".

Rivadavia described the production as "muddy" and "less-than-ideal". According to the band's vocalist, Erik Danielsson, "[t]here were some minor mistakes regarding the productions which could have been done better, but on the other hand it is stuff that you hear after listening to it through and through far too much. At least it does not sound as whatever cheap fucking 'primitive, cult, limited, true underground Black Metal' shit out there, which is a relief. I like the album, it's one of the better to come from Sweden, it's just my sense of perfection that haunts at times."

The lyrics are based upon "Satanism, or - to avoid confusion - Devilworship" and play "a terribly important role in our creations". Danielsson explained the title as "a rather personal attempt of mine to symbolically explain the idea of salvation through spiritual slavery and the will to serve. […] To put it briefly, the 'Rabid Death's Curse' is the curse of life, the disease which we are condemned to suffer from until divine punishment comes upon us."

== Artwork ==
Timo "Davthvs" Ketola was "responsible for almost the whole layout" of the LP version as well as "the rather successful idea of printing the LP inside out, so that the lustreless side was turned out". Danielsson, who draws artwork for Watain and other bands himself, was "very pleased in working with such a talented man". The gatefold contains a photography which, according to Ziegler, is "a bit hard to recognise" at first sight "but when the observer looks at it a bit more he witnesses it’s a turned upside down photo of a decayed bird surrounded by flying autumn leaves"; the idea came from Danielsson, who stated that dead birds were Ketola's trademark. The latter had found a dead, rotten bird and scanned it for the artwork, soiling his scanner in the process. According to Danielsson, "there's truly much symbolism behind the usage of the bird. A dead, decayed bird represents to me the death of freedom, and the beauty that lies in the silent process of its way into ashes and dirt. It also visualises the idea of the "Rabid Death's Curse" quite well, the molten dead lying in slumber, unconsciously walking towards the inescapable claws of Satan!"

== Reviews ==
Rivadavia wrote that although Rabid Death's Curse "suggested that Watain were, at best, content to produce intentionally crude facsimiles of inspirational forefathers ranging from Bathory to Mayhem and, at worst, unable to do anything else", "the Swedes were really just finding their feet" and the album "fulfills an important function in Watain's career arc, one that the casual listener need never pay heed to, but which loyal fans will likely want to explore at some point in order to better comprehend all that followed".

== Track listing ==
All songs written by Watain, except where noted.

No.	Title	Lyrics	Length
1.	"The Limb Crucifix"		4:21
2.	"Rabid Death's Curse"		5:21
3.	"On Horns Impaled"		2:35
4.	"Life Dethroned"		5:45
5.	"Walls of Life Ruptured"		4:21
6.	"Agony Fires"	K. v Bonsdorff	5:22
7.	"Angelrape"		3:40
8.	"Mortem Sibi Consciscere"		7:02
Total length:			38:27

The original LP version by End All Life Productions included the Sabbat cover "Curdle the Blood" which is not featured on the CD version by Drakkar Productions. The 2004 CD re-release includes Dødheimsgard cover "When Heavens End". The bonus track "The Essence of Black Purity" from Watain's first official release, the 7" The Essence of Black Purity, put out by the Swedish Grim Rune Productions, was added to the remastered 2008 CD re-release by Season of Mist.

== Personnel ==
- H. (Håkan Jonsson) – drums
- P. (Pelle Forsberg) – guitars
- E. (Erik Danielsson) – vocals, bass
- C. (Crippe Blom) – guitars

Additional personnel

- Davthvs – artwork, layout
- Tore Stjerna – producer, engineering, mastering
