= Black Metal Sacrifice =

Live album by Watain
- Released: October 1999
- Recorded: August 10, 1999, Uppsala, Sweden
- Genre: Black metal
- Length: 26:58
- Label: Independent

Watain chronology
Go Fuck Your Jewish "God" (1998)	Black Metal Sacrifice (1999)	The Essence of Black Purity (1999)

Black Metal Sacrifice is the second release by the black metal band Watain. It was recorded on their concert with Malign and Dark Funeral in Uppsala in 1999, organised by Watain and Grim Rune Productions. The live tape was originally "mostly spread among the closest ones" and re-released on CD format in 2007. "Sons of Fucking Hell" is a cover of Bloodsoil, "the very unknown band" vocalist Erik Danielsson "played in for some years before Watain, and never released anything with".

== Track listing ==
1. "The Walls of Life Ruptured" – 4:17
2. "On Horns Impaled" – 2:41
3. "Midnight Possession" – 4:01
4. "Angelrape" – 3:52
5. "Sons of Fucking Hell" – 2:07
6. "Essence of Black Purity" – 4:08
7. "The Mightiest of Maledictions" – 5:52
