= Von (band) =

American black metal band

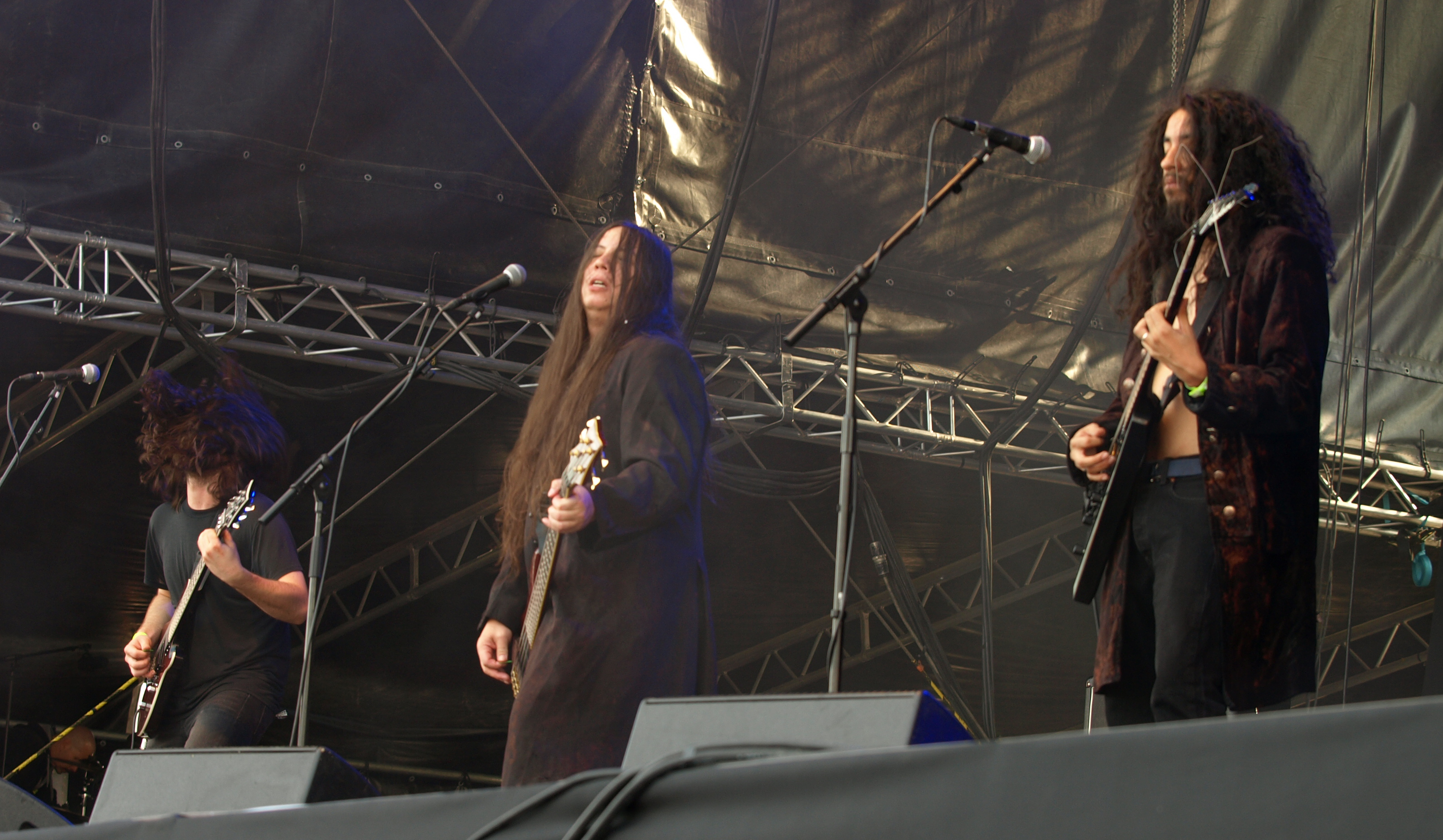
- Von live at Tuska Open Air 2013

Background information
- Origin: O'ahu, Hawaii
- Genres: Black metal
- Years active: 1987–1992, 2010–present
- Label: Von Records
- Members: Venien; Lord Giblete; Xaphan; Dirty FvKn! Pistols
- Past members: Goat; Snake; Kill; Blood; Charlie Fell

Von is an American black metal band formed in 1987 in O'ahu, Hawaii, and later relocating to San Francisco. They influenced the second wave of black metal.

The band's name is sometimes falsely thought to be an acronym for "Victory Orgasm Nazi(s)". Varg Vikernes used those words to spell the band's name during a phone interview with Michael Moynihan because Moynihan apparently did not hear the name correctly. According to the band, the name stands for "nothing but images of darkness and blood".

== History ==
Von was allegedly formed in 1987 by Goat, Snake, and Venien (who left the band in 1990, before VON was chosen as the band name). The role and involvement of Venien in the early days of Von has been unclear, as no proof that this member was active in the band during that period exists. In late 1990 or early 1991, Kill joined the band as bassist and the trio recorded their Satanic Blood demo. During 1991, Von played a couple of live gigs and recorded another demo, Blood Angel, which was never released on its own. The band disbanded in 1992, shortly after the release of Satanic Blood. The band's members also recorded a gothic rock demo under the name Sixx.

The early days of Von are largely undocumented, and Venien's membership during 1987–1990 has been a matter of contention among fans. It is also unclear if the band even existed before 1990, as no proof exists. Many people believe the band was formed in late 1990 or early 1991 with the line-up of Goat (guitars, vocals), Kill (bass) and Snake (drums). Many people consider this line-up to be the only true line-up of Von and disregard the band's post-2010 material. Venien has been accused of trying to cover up facts of Von's past on various archiving and encyclopedic websites, in an attempt to further solidifying his professed involvement in Von's original formation.

In 2003, Nuclear War Now! Productions released Satanic Blood Angel, a double CD/triple LP compilation featuring the band's demos on one CD and a recording of a live show on another. Besides the original Satanic Blood demo, this was the only other official Von release prior to 2010. In 2009, Nuclear War Now! Productions released the Sixx recording on an LP entitled Sister Devil.

The band reformed with a new line-up for a one-off show on June 6, 2010, at the Armageddon Fest in London, England. Watain and The Devil's Blood opened for the band, marking the first time Von had played live in 20 years. Snake, the drummer, was replaced by Blood as a session drummer, and bassist Kill was replaced by Venien; this was the first time Venien had actively played with the band. The band was also joined by a second guitarist: J. Giblet. Goat was the only member left in the band from the original line-up of Goat, Kill, and Snake.

To commemorate the show, the new line-up of the band put out a brand new 7-inch single with re-recorded versions of "Satanic Blood" and "Veadtuck", and a new song titled "Blood Von", a reworked version of the "Von" track from the "Satanic Blood" demo cassette. The 7-inch was released on VMG Records with a limit of 500 copies.

After the London show, the last member of the original line-up, Goat, and new drummer Blood left the band to focus on Goat's solo-project, called Von Goat. Goat's departure left Von in the hands of Venien, who hired a slew of session musicians to start writing and rehearsing new and reworked material for two full-length records. Most of said members were with the band for only very short periods of time.

On October 31, 2012, Von, with yet another new lineup headed by Venien, released their debut studio album titled Satanic Blood. On March 22, 2013, a second full-length album, titled Dark Gods: Seven Billion Slaves, was released on CD and as a download.

== Musical style and legacy ==
Von plays highly simplistic black metal with short songs based on almost continuous blast beats (occasionally accompanied by drum fills) and repetition of only from one to three riffs, each containing only about three or four power chords. The vocals are performed in a guttural growling fashion more characteristic of death metal than the Scandinavian black metal style established later. In Lords of Chaos, Satanic Blood was described as "one raw-sounding demo tape".

Von can be seen having been ahead of their time, playing minimalistic black metal at a time when the genre was virtually non-existent, especially in the thrash-oriented West Coast metal scene of that era.

Von has gained a cult following in the black metal underground since their disbandment and the few recordings of Von are considered classic and pioneering black metal. Prominent black metal bands have covered Von, either on record or live (or both), including Dark Funeral, Enthroned, Krieg, Taake and Watain (who are also named after a Von song).

== Members ==
Current members

- Venien (Jason Ventura) – lead vocals, bass
- HangMan (Carter Grant) – guitars, backing vocals

Former members

- Goat (Shawn Calizo) – lead vocals, guitars
- Snake – drums
- Kill (Joe Trevisano) – bass
- Blood – drums
- Charlie Fell – drums
- Hammer of Dread (Alex Bank Rollins) – guitars
- Lord Giblete (JGiblete Cuervo) – lead guitar, backing vocals
- Xaphan (Julian Hollowell) – rhythm guitar
- Dirty FvKn! Pistols (Anthony Mainiero) – drums

== Discography ==
=== Albums ===
- Satanic Blood (2012)
- Dark Gods: Seven Billion Slaves (2013)
- Dark Gods: Birth of the Architects (2017)

=== EPs ===
- Satanic Blood (2010), recorded in 2010, three-track 7-inch EP with tracks "Satanic Blood", "Blood Von", and "Veadtuck". All of the tracks are re-recorded and re-written from their original form.

=== Compilation albums ===
- Satanic Blood Angel (CD/2LP, 2003, re-released in 2009 on CD and 2LP), Nuclear War Now! Productions

=== Demos ===
- Satanic (1990), limited to three copies only
- Satanic Blood (1992), recorded in 1991
- Blood Angel (1992), unreleased, recorded between 1991 and 1992. The demo was never released on its own, only as part of the Satanic Blood Angel compilation released in 2003.

=== DVDs ===
- Satanic Blood Ritual (2010), Nuclear War Now! Productions

=== Bootlegs ===
Several bootlegs exist, mostly containing the Satanic Blood demo, including releases on Hellspawn and Hammerheart Records, while one notable example was a split compilation with Dark Funeral entitled Devil Pigs, released by Karmageddon Media.
