= Death SS =

Italian heavy metal band

- Origin: Pesaro, Italy
- Genres: Heavy metal; shock rock
- Years active: 1977–1984; 1988–2008; 2012–present
- Labels: Minotauro; Discomagic; Contempo; Lucifer Rising; Live Global
- Website: deathss.com

Death SS (later intended as a contraction of In Death of Steve Sylvester) is an Italian heavy metal band formed in 1977. They have been described as "horror metal".

== History ==
Death SS was formed in 1977 in Pesaro by Steve Sylvester (born Stefano Silvestri), a future member of Ordo Templi Orientis, and Paul Chain (Paolo Catena), who later embraced an experimental form of doom metal with his solo project, Paul Chain Violet Theatre. Sylvester left the band in 1982, and Chain replaced him with Sanctis Ghoram (featured on the Evil Metal EP) before ending the project in 1984 to start a solo career. Sylvester reformed the band in 1988 as the only original member. This incarnation of the band recorded their first full-length album, ...in Death of Steve Sylvester. There were many line-up changes in the ensuing years, with Sylvester the only constant.

The album Panic was partially recorded in the US, with producer Neil Kernon, because the band liked his work with Queensrÿche, Judas Priest, Dokken, Nevermore, David Bowie, Rush and Skrew and had, according to Sylvester, "a particular touch in the dark side of Heavy Metal [...] that we were looking for". The band's management contacted Kernon, who accepted after listening to the band's demos of the new songs. The album was released in 2000 on Sylvester's label, Lucifer Rising, and Dream Catcher.

== Musical style and influence ==
Death SS combines elements of horror, occultism and metal to a style termed "horror metal" by AllMusic, and is also considered an influence on black metal. The band itself calls its music "horror music". Death SS is one of the sources of inspiration for the Swedish metal band Ghost.

== Members ==
Current members

- Steve Sylvester – lead vocals (1977–1982, 1988–2008, 2012–present)
- Freddy Delirio – keyboards, synthesizers, backing vocals (1994–1996, 2005–2008, 2012–present)
- Unam Talbot – drums (2022-present)
- Demeter – bass (2022-present)
- Ghiulz Borroni – guitars (2022-present)

Former members

- Paul Chain – guitars, backing vocals, organ (1977–1984)
- Claud Galley – rhythm guitar (1980–1981), bass (1981–1984)
- Danny Hughes (Daniele Ugolini) – bass (1977–1978)
- Danny Hughes (Gabriele Tommasini) – bass (1978–1981)
- Tommy Chaste (Tommaso Castaldi) – drums (1977–1979)
- Thomas Chaste (Franco Caforio) – drums (1979–1981)
- Thomas "Hand" Chaste (Andrea Vianelli) – drums (1981–1984)
- Sanctis Ghoram – lead vocals (1982–1984)
- Kurt Templar – guitars, backing vocals (1987–1991)
- Boris Hunter – drums (1987–1991)
- Christian Wise – guitars, backing vocals (1987–1989)
- Erik Landley – bass (1987–1989)
- Kevin Reynolds – guitars, backing vocals (1989–1991)
- Alberto Simonini – guitars, backing vocals (1989)
- Marc Habey – bass, backing vocals (1989–1990)
- Jason Minelli – guitars, backing vocals (1991–1994)
- Maurizio Figliolia – guitars, backing vocals (1991)

- Ross Lukather – drums (1991–1997, 2005)
- Marcel Skirr – keyboards, synthesizers, backing vocals (1992–1993)
- Al Priest – guitars, backing vocals (1991–1994)
- Andy Barrington – bass, backing vocals (1990–1993)
- Judas Kenton – bass, backing vocals (1994–1996)
- Vincent Phibes – guitars, backing vocals (1994–1997)
- Emil Bandera – guitars, backing vocals (1996–2006)
- Oleg Smirnoff – keyboards, synthesizers, backing vocals (1997–2005)
- Felix Moon – guitars, backing vocals (1994–1998)
- Simon Garth (Nardo Lunardi) – guitars, backing vocals (1998)
- Simon Garth (Ilario Danti) – guitars, backing vocals (1998)
- Andrei Karloff – bass, backing vocals (1997–1999)
- Kaiser Sose – bass, backing vocals (1999–2002)
- Bob Daemon – bass, backing vocals (2002–2005)
- Anton Chaney – drums (1997–2005)
- Dave Simeone – drums (2006–2008)
- Francis Thorn – guitars, backing vocals (2007–2008)
- Bozo Wolff – drums (2012–2022)
- Glenn Strange – bass, backing vocals (2005–2008, 2012–2022)
- Al De Noble – guitars, backing vocals (2007–2008, 2012–2022)

== Discography ==
=== Albums ===
- ...in Death of Steve Sylvester (Discomagic/Metalmaster 1988)
- Black Mass (Discomagic/Metalmaster 1989)
- Heavy Demons (Contempo/Rosemary's Baby 1991)
- Do What Thou Wilt (Lucifer Rising 1997)
- Panic (Lucifer Rising 2000)
- Humanomalies (Lucifer Rising 2002)
- The Seventh Seal (Lucifer Rising/Black Widow Records 2006)
- Resurrection (Lucifer Rising 2013)
- Rock 'n' Roll Armageddon (Lucifer Rising 2018)
- X (Lucifer Rising 2021)
- The Entity (Lucifer Rising 2025)

=== Live albums ===
- The Cursed Concert (Contempo 1992)
- Il ritorno degli occulti (200 copies, Cursed Coven 1998)
- Live 1990: The Complete Black Mass Show (200 copies, Cursed Coven 2006)
- Live at I-Gods of Metal 2008 (CD/DVD, Live Global/Self 2009)
- Beyond Resurrection (Lucifer Rising Records 2017)

=== Singles/EPs ===
- The Horned God of the Witches (Demo EP 1981)
- Evil Metal EP (Metal Eye Records 1983)
- "Kings of Evil" (Metalmaster 1989)
- "Vampire" (Metalmaster 1989)
- "In the Darkness" (Metalmaster 1989)
- Where Have You Gone? EP (Contempo 1991)
- Straight to Hell EP (Contempo 1993)
- The Cursed Singles boxset (Avantgarde Music 1995)
- "Baron Samedi" (Lucifer Rising 1998)
- "Scarlet Woman" (Lucifer Rising 1999)
- "Hi-Tech Jesus" (Lucifer Rising 2000)
- Lady of Babylon EP (Lucifer Rising 2000)
- Let The Sabbath Begin 2 CD EP (Lucifer Rising 2001)
- Transylvania (Lucifer Rising 2001)
- "Pain" (Lucifer Rising 2003)
- "Sinful Dove" (Lucifer Rising 2004)
- "Give 'Em Hell" (Lucifer Rising 2005)
- "Der Golem" (2013)
- The Darkest Night EP (Lucifer Rising 2013)
- "Ogre's Lullaby" (2013)
- "Profanation" (2013)
- "The Night of the Witch" (2013)
- Eaters (2013)
- "Dyonisus" (2014)
- "The Crimson Shrine" (2016)
- The 7th Seal Ep (2020)

=== Compilations ===
- The Story of Death SS. 1977–1984 (Minotauro 1987)
- Horror Music (Lucifer Rising 1996)
- The Horned God of Witches (Lucifer Rising/Black Widow Records 2004)
- Steve Sylvester – Friends of Hell (Cursed Coven 2006)
- The Story of Death SS. 1977–1984 – Part Two (2008)
- All the Colors of the Dark (2011)
- Horror Music – Vol.2 – Singles, Outtakes & Rare Tracks – 1997-2007 (2014)
- Rarities, Live & Outtakes – An Exclusive for the Cursed Coven (2019)
- The Story of Death SS – Early Demos & Live Recordings 1977-1984 / The Horned God of the Witches (2019)
- The Evil Singles – 1982 / 1997 (2020)
- Special Eleventh (2022)
- Horror Music Vol. 3 – B-Sides & Outtakes 2012-2022 (2023)
