= Funeral Mist =

Swedish black metal band

- Origin: Stockholm, Sweden
- Genre: Black metal
- Years active: 1993–present
- Labels: Pounding Metal Productions; Shadow Records; Norma Evangelium Diaboli; Season of Mist
- Members: Arioch
- Past members: Typhos; Velion; Vintras; Necromorbus; Nachash

Funeral Mist is a Swedish black metal band formed in Stockholm in 1993. They have released four albums, three EPs, and a compilation box set. Since 2003, the band's sole permanent member is Arioch, also known as the frontman of black metal band Marduk, which he joined in 2004.

== History ==
The band was founded in the autumn of 1993 by now former members. Bass player Arioch joined in the summer of 1994.

In summer 1995, Funeral Mist recorded the demo Darkness, released in early 1996. The second demo, Havoc, was recorded in summer/autumn 1996, with only Arioch from the original line-up, and new drummer Necromorbus (Tore Stjerna). In late 1997, they recorded the EP Devilry, released in summer 1998 in CD and vinyl format. The vinyl edition was limited to 300 copies and featured exclusive track "Hellspell 2". This track was included on the 2005 re-release, which also includes the Havoc recordings.

Their first full-length album, Salvation, was released on Norma Evangelium Diaboli in 2003, while the second album, Maranatha, was released in February 2009 on the same label.

In September 2012, Season of Mist re-released Devilry and Salvation. In 2017, Norma Evangelium Diaboli reissued Devilry, Salvation, and Maranatha on vinyl.

On December 2nd, 2013, to coincide with the band's 20th anniversary, Norma Evangelium Diaboli released the vinyl box set Trisagion, including the band's entire discography thus far.

On August 27, 2015, during Beyond the Gates IV in Bergen, Arioch performed "The God Supreme" live for the first time with Icelandic black metal band Misþyrming. This was reportedly the only time Arioch ever performed Funeral Mist material live.

Funeral Mist released their third full-length, Hekatomb, on June 15, 2018, on Norma Evangelium Diaboli.

In January 2020, Norma Evangelium Diaboli released the 4-tape box set In Manus Tuas - The Cassette Collection.

Funeral Mist released Deiform on December 17, 2021 through Norma Evangelium Diaboli.

== Musical style and ideology ==
Funeral Mist plays a black metal style characterised by Norma Evangelium Diaboli as violent, chaotic and "musically bizarre", to which Arioch added "complex layers of ill sounds" on Maranatha. The lyrics deal with devil worship and blasphemy, often using (sometimes slightly changed) quotes from the King James Version of the Bible for the latter. Arioch points out that "a band that claims to play Black Metal must always have Satanism and nothing but Satanism as the highest priority in their music and concept as well as in their personal lives" and that neither the voice, nor the sound and musical style make a black metal band.

== Band members ==
=== Current line-up ===
- Arioch (a.k.a. Mortuus) - bass (1994 - present), vocals, guitars (1996 - present)

=== Session musicians ===
- Lars Broddesson (a.k.a. Lars B.) - drums (2008 - present)

=== Past members ===
- Typhos (Henrik Ekeroth) - guitars, vocals (1993-1995)
- Vintras - guitars (1993-1995)
- Velion - drums (1993-1995)
- Nachash - guitars (1996-2003)
- Necromorbus (Tore Stjerna) - drums (1996-2003)

== Discography ==
=== Studio albums ===
- 2003 - Salvation
- 2009 - Maranatha
- 2018 - Hekatomb
- 2021 - Deiform

=== Demos ===
- 1995 - Promo '95 (demo)
- 1995 - Darkness (demo)
- 1996 - Havoc (demo)

=== Miscellaneous ===
- 1998 - Devilry (EP)
- 2013 - Trisagion (compilation)
- 2020 - In Manus Tuas - The Cassette Collection (compilation)
