= Set Teitan =

Italian guitarist

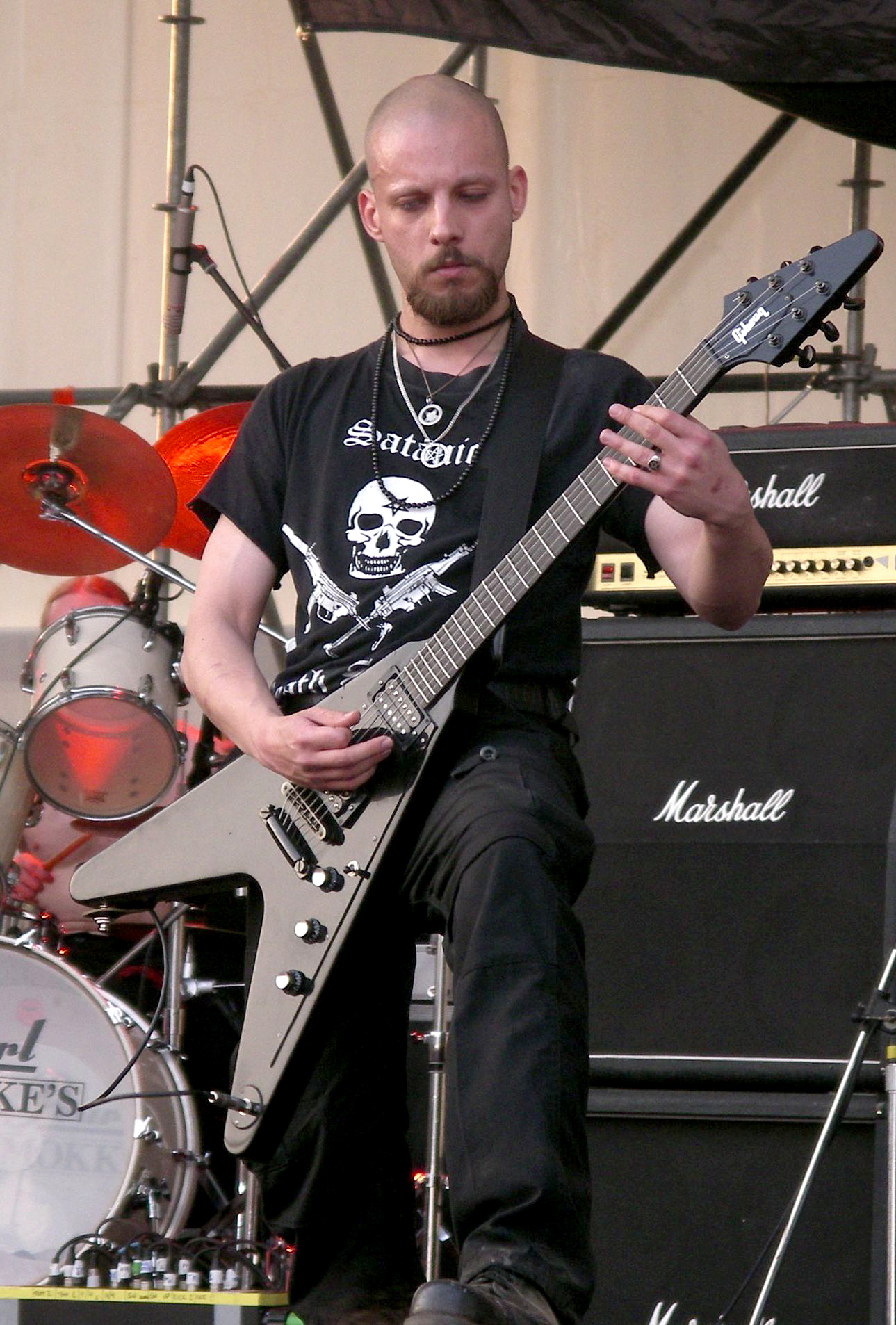
- Set Teitan performing in 2005

Background information
- Born: 12 September 1978 (age 47)
- Origin: Italy
- Genres: Black metal, melodic death metal
- Occupation: Musician
- Instrument: Guitar
- Years active: 1997–present
- Formerly of: Aborym, Dissection, Bloodline, Vomitain

Davide Totaro (born 12 September 1978), known professionally as Set Teitan or Sethlans Teitan, is an Italian guitarist based in Sweden. He was the guitarist of industrial black metal band Aborym from 1997 to 2005, lead guitarist for Bloodline from 2000 to 2005, as well as the second guitarist of the Swedish black/melodic death metal band Dissection. From 2005 to 2018, he performed as lead guitarist for Watain, but in 2018, he stepped away from the band after a photograph surfaced of him giving the Nazi salute. He has also performed on Arckanum's albums Antikosmos and ÞÞÞÞÞÞÞÞÞÞÞ.
