= Tore Stjerna =

- Born: 18 August 1976 (age 49)
- Genres: Black metal
- Occupation: Musician

Tore Gunnar Stjerna (a.k.a. Necromorbus; born 1976) is a Swedish multi-instrumentalist and producer. He has played guitar and drums in the following bands; Nex, Chaos Omen, Corpus Christii, Funeral Mist, Ofermod, Zavorash, In Aeternum. He also founded Necromorbus Studio (NBS Studio) in Sweden. While running the studio, he has produced and mastered albums for bands such as Armagedda, Bitter Peace, Deströyer 666, Inferno, Jess and the Ancient Ones, Leviathan, Mayhem, Merrimack, Noctem, Nominon, and Portrait.
