= Antaeus (band) =

French black metal band

- Origin: Maisons-Laffitte, France
- Genres: Black metal
- Years active: 1993–present
- Labels: End All Life; Norma Evangelium Diaboli
- Members: MkM; Set
- Past members: Piat; Storm; Black Priest; Kheer; Olivier; Philipe; Thorgon; Sagoth

Antaeus are a French black metal band.

== History ==
Antaeus were formed in 1993 but were more of a side project and "like 'nothing special' at all" according to themselves. A., who also was the bass player of Blut Aus Nord, left the band after a few rehearsals, and vocalist MkM and guitarist Piat continued as a duo. An early recording was done with a drum machine and Piat's vocals and spread in a few copies, though the recording "was crap and really fucked up" according to the band. The band "[t]urned out more serious" in 1995, and they "became a real band" when drummer Storm on drums and bass player Black Priest joined them. A rehearsal tape got Antaeus more known within the underground and interviewed by various zines. In 1996, many line-up changes and conflicts with other bands followed; as the French scene seemed to get split into two "well separated parts", the band "chose to remain a witness of this degradation; having done the mistake to involve in the confrontation, they realized that there was no time to waste with such bands". They also released their first real demo Supremacist Dawn, which sold 350 copies.

Bass player Kheer left the band before the gig at the Gibus Club, where "all major Black Metal and Death Metal gigs took place", with Despond, Apocryphal and Flystrike. He was replaced by Set entered the band a few weeks before the show. Although the stage presence was "rather short --around 20 minutes--, the band had the time to expose its brutality on stage". The keyboard parts were performed by Lord Tenebro Maleficium, who would later be "evolving under the MANTAR monicker". Tensions within the band created by "[b]eing the target of some groups (labels and bands)" led to the departure of Piat (aka Antaeus) just after their gig with Impaled Nazarene. Set became the new guitar player. Children of the Grave Zine's editor Olivier joined Antaeus as a second guitar player; he left the band after the gig with Thus Defiled. Philippe joined them on bass, which "led the band to a higher state", which allowed Antaeus to take part in the Metal 13 compilation CD with well-known French acts like Massacra and Agressor as well as Despond and other acts. Their contribution "isn't representative of AntaeuS (due to its crap recording once again)" according to the band but "[t]he exposure given […] led to a new era for the band". They also contributed a track to the Encyclopedia Pestilencia triple compilation CD released through Velcet Music International.

Their debut album, Cut Your Flesh and Worship Satan, was a collection of re-recorded demo tracks. They then signed to Osmose Productions for their second album De Principii Evangelikum. By 2003, all the original members had left and since then the band has been led by MkM and guitarist Set.

In 2006, the Norma Evangelium Diaboli label released their third album Blood Libels. Following the release of Blood Libels, the band were semi-active/inactive for quite some time. However more recently they have reactivated as a touring band.

In October 2016, it was revealed Antaeus would release their fourth studio album, their first studio release in 10 years, titled Condemnation and it was released on 18 November 2016.

== Musical style and ideology ==
The band's 1995 rehearsal tape's "mayhemic sound […] could have linked the band with the rather hated Black Legions (VLAD TEPES/ BELKETRE/ MUTIILATION) since the recording and the atmosphere were close to what raw sounding Black Metal should be". They describe their first real demo Supremacist Dawn as "the worst recording ever from AntaeuS". Blood Libels has been described as "aggressive black metal with a pinch (or ten) of death metal thrown in". The album closes with the nine-and-a-half-minute title track, which has been described as "so intense it's literally almost unbearable".

Vocalist MkM believes that black metal must be Satanic but that not all band members need to be Satanists and he is "maybe the only one into Satanism within the band, using that term 'SataN', but when I get to talk with the others, I feel something I couldn’t feel with others who would pretend to be 'evil'". The group's slogan is "Anti God, Anti Music, Anti You".

== Discography ==
=== Studio albums ===
- 2000 – Cut Your Flesh and Worship Satan
- 2002 – De Principii Evangelikum
- 2006 – Blood Libels
- 2016 - Condemnation

=== Other releases ===
- 1996 – Supremacist Dawn (demo tape)
- 1998 – Split demo with Eternal Majesty
- 1999 – Rekordin 2000-I
- 1999 – Nihil Khaos (live tape)
- 2001 – Reverse Voices of the Dead (split EP with Necrophagia)
- 2001 – SPK Kommando (split EP with Deviant, Eternal Majesty, Hell Militia)
- 2002 – Split MLP with Aosoth
- 2002 – Satanic Audio Violence (demo)
- 2003 – Krieg vs. Antaeus (split live tape with Krieg)
- 2004 – Rot (Ltd 7-inch EP)
- 2005 – From the Entrails to the Dirt (split CD/7" EP with Malicious Secrets, Mütiilation and Deathspell Omega)
- 2009 – Antaeus / Katharsis (Ltd 7-inch EP with Katharsis)

== Band members ==
- Hervé Queyroix - vocals (1996-)
- Bruno Papy - guitar (1999-)

=== Former members ===
- Black Priest - bass (1994)
- Greg Piat - vocals (1994–1995) guitar (1995–1999)
- Yov Moor - drums (1994–2003)
- Kheer - bass (1995–1996)
- Olivier - guitar (1996)
- Philipe - bass (1996)
- Sagoth - bass (1999–2003)
- Thorgon - guitar (1999–2003)
- Oliver - drums (2003–2006)
- Servus - guitar (2003–2006)
- Marianne Séjourné - bass (2003–2008; died 2013)
- Olivier Verron - guitar (2008–2009)

=== Live musicians ===
- Fabrizzio Volponi - drums (2006)
- Thomas Hennequin - drums (2009, 2011–2015, ?-present)
- INVRI - bass (2011–2015)
- Sébastien Tuvi - guitar (2011–2015)
- Jeff Tandy - bass (2014)
- Saroth - guitar (?-present)
- Krig - bass (2018–present)
