= Vampires of Black Imperial Blood =

Studio album by Mütiilation
- Released: 1995
- Recorded: Black Legions Studio
- Genre: Black metal
- Label: Drakkar Productions (DKCD001)

Mütiilation chronology
Hail Satanas We Are the Black Legions (1994)	Vampires of Black Imperial Blood (1995)	Remains of a Ruined, Dead, Cursed Soul (1999)

End All Life Productions re-release

Vampires of Black Imperial Blood is the debut album by French black metal group Mütiilation. The album is noted for being the first full length release in the Les Légions Noires movement, it was also the first full-length CD publication from Drakkar Productions, a French record label freshly established in 1994 by fellow musician Noktu (frontman of Celestia).

== Reissues ==
Originally limited to 1000 copies, the album was reissued in 1999 as a double-LP by End All Life Productions, in a limited pressing of 100 numbered copies. This edition had a slightly different track listing, including three bonus tracks. The album was bootlegged in 2005 by Tragic Empire Records, in an undisclosed amount, with the same track listing as the double-LP. In 2009 Dark Adversary Productions (Australia) did an official reissue of this album with the same track listing as the original CD press.

== Critical reception ==
"Magical Shadows of a Tragic Past"
A segment of the opening track, featuring the introductory riff, an up-tempo part with blasting drums and loud vocals, followed by a short melodic section.

This album, together with March to the Black Holocaust, was instrumental in establishing the reputation of the Black Legions among underground black metal circles. The overall reception of the album was highly polarized with some dismissing it as "forgettable melancholic drivel". Globally, the most notable elements appear to be the "twisted", "demented but catchy riffs" and, most importantly, the "melancholic", "bleak and lugubrious", "depressive atmosphere", that differed from the established Norwegian black metal acts of that time. On the base of this album, Mütiilation is often credited for inventing the "depressive/suicidal black metal" subgenre, that would spawn acts such as Xasthur and Shining. However, unlike groups the album influenced, "Vampires..." shows a wider range of dynamics and an unmistakable style of songwriting, especially for that era of the genre.

While the production quality has been acclaimed as "significantly clearer" than on earlier Mütiilation demos, other reviewers described it as a "nonexistent production", or even an "ultra primitive sound quality (...) making Darkthrone sound downright hi-fi".

In 2013, Decibel ranked Vampires of Black Imperial Blood at number 99 on its list of the Top 100 Black Metal Albums of All Time.

== Track listings ==
=== Drakkar Original Pressing/Dark Adversary Pressing ===
No.	Title	Length
1.	"Magical Shadows of a Tragic Past"	10:00
2.	"Born Under the Master's Spell" (this track is missing on the re-release.)	5:29
3.	"Ravens of My Funeral"	7:41
4.	"Black Imperial Blood"	5:35
5.	"Eternal Empire of Majesty Death"	7:06
6.	"Transylvania"	5:52
7.	"Under Ardailles Night"	4:22
8.	"Tears of a Melancholic Vampire"	8:01

=== End All Life LP ===
No.	Title	Length
1.	"Magical Shadows of a Tragic Past"	10:00
2.	"Ravens of My Funeral"	7:41
3.	"Black Imperial Blood"	5:35
4.	"Eternal Empire of Majesty Death"	7:06
5.	"Transylvania"	5:52
6.	"Under Ardailles Night"	4:22
7.	"Tears of a Melancholic Vampire"	8:01
8.	"Forests of an Evil Dream" (bonus track)	5:27
9.	"Travels To Sadness, Hate And Depression" (bonus track)	7:13
10.	"The Rite Of Darkness" (Bathory cover version, from The Return......, 1985)	5:32

== Trivia ==
- This was the first recording to feature Mørdrëd.
- This album features both real drums as well as a drum machine, while on the following Mütiilation releases (notably ones that were recorded as a one-man project) Meyhna'ch would rely solely on a drum machine. The final Mütiilation album, Sorrow Galaxies, also featured actual drums.
