= Mütiilation / Deathspell Omega split =

Mütiilation / Deathspell Omega

EP by Mütiilation and Deathspell Omega
- Released: 2002
- Genre: Black metal
- Labels: End All Life Productions (EAL025)

Mütiilation and Deathspell Omega chronology
Destroy Your Life for Satan (2001)	Mütiilation / Deathspell Omega (2002)	Majestas Leprosus (2003)

Mütiilation / Deathspell Omega was a split 10" between Mütiilation and Deathspell Omega. It was Mütiilation's third release on End All Life Productions.

== Track listing ==
1. Mütiilation – "Beyond the Decay of Time and Flies" (6:33)
2. Deathspell Omega – "Insanity Supreme" (7:39)
3. Deathspell Omega – "For Fire and Void Become One" (7:24)

== Trivia ==
- The 10" LP was released in only 400 hand-numbered copies.
- Even if Mütiilation was no longer part of The Black Legions, the side of the record features their symbol.
