= Celestia (band) =

French black metal band

- Origin: Avignon, France
- Genre: Black metal
- Years active: 1995–2015, 2020-present
- Labels: Drakkar Productions; Hungry AK-47 Productions; Sombre Records; End All Life Productions; Klozed Circle Produktionz; Mysticum Productions; Agonia Records; Apparitia Recordings; Full Moon Productions
- Members: Noktu Geiistmortt; Ghaast
- Past members: Fureïss; Astreyla; T.N.D.
- Website: apparitia.net

Celestia is a French black metal band from Avignon, formed in 1995 by Noktu, the only consistent member. Celestia disbanded in 2015 and reformed in 2020.

Celestia remained in the demo stage until around 1999, when they released the EP A Cave Full of Bats through Drakkar Productions with a lineup of Noktu (vocals, bass) and Fureïss/Franck (guitar). More demos, singles, split albums and a live album followed before they released their first studio album, Apparitia - Sumptuous Spectre (2002), through Full Moon Productions, with drummer Astreyla added to the lineup. The two main members of Celestia were Noktu and Fureïss. Fureïss was the only guitarist for Celestia from 1998 to 2005, from the promo tape A Dying Out Ecstasy (1998) until the second mix of the 2002 album Apparitia Sumptuous Spectre in 2005. He composed half the songs (the other half by Noktu) and arranged and recorded all tracks on Celestia during this time.

The latter-day lineup was Noktu (vocals, guitar, bass) and Ghaast (guitar). With drummer Astreyla, who had previously left the band, they recorded Celestia's second album, Frigidiis Apotheosia : Abstinencia Genesiis, released in 2008 through Apparitia Records. They kept their minimalistic black metal sound. Malefic (Xasthur), a guest on the album, added keyboards to the music. Various session drummers and guitarists were brought in for rehearsals, recordings and live shows. Noktu owns the record label Drakkar Productions, on which he released some of The Black Legions (a group of French underground black metal bands) albums.

Noktu played guitar and bass and sang in the band Mortifera, while Neige (Alcest) played drums, half of the vocals and composed tracks such as "Ciel Brouillé" and "Le Revenant". Mortifera has a similar sound to Celestia. Noktu has played in Genocide Kommando and Gestapo 666.

== Discography ==
=== Demos ===
- "Evanescence" demo (1997)
- "A Dying Out Ecstasy" demo (1998)
- "Infected by Rats" demo (1999)
- "The Awakening of the Dormant Fiancée" demo (1999)
- "Pourriture et Vermine" demo (1999)
- "Dead Insecta Sequestration" demo (2001)
- "Delhÿs-cätess" demo (2007)

=== EPs ===
- "A Cave Full of Bats" EP (1999)
- "Spectra" 7" single (2000)
- "Evoking Grace and Splendour" 7" single (2002)

=== Albums ===
- Apparitia - Sumptuous Spectre (2002) Full Moon Productions
- Frigidiis Apotheosia : Abstinencia Genesiis (2008) Apparitia Recordings
- Archaenae Perfectii (2010) Apparitia Recordings
- Aetherra (2017) Drakkar Productions
- Forever Gone (2025) Drakkar Productions

=== Live albums ===
- Under the Reign of Terror and Tyranny (1999)

=== Split albums and collaborations ===
- Split with Draugwath (1998)
- Split with Inferno (1999)
- French-Southern Black Metal War split with Evil (1999)
- Darkness Enfold the Sky/Black Slaughterization split with Goatfire (2001)

=== Best of/compilations ===
- A Cave Full of Bats best of (2002)
- Crucified Dead Flesh (2003)
- Dead Insecta Sequestration (2003)
