= Remains of a Ruined, Dead, Cursed Soul =

Compilation album by Mütiilation
- Released: 1999
- Recorded: Black Legions Studio
- Genre: Black metal
- Labels: Drakkar Productions (DKCD008)

Mütiilation chronology
Vampires of Black Imperial Blood (1995)	Remains of a Ruined, Dead, Cursed Soul (1999)	New False Prophet (2000)

Alternative cover
- End All Life re-release

Remains of a Ruined, Dead, Cursed Soul is a compilation album by the French black metal band Mütiilation. It was the first material to be released in four years, and since the expulsion of The Black Legions. It compiles songs taken from the demo Evil - The Gestalt of Abomination, which was recorded in 1993, but never available to the public, and songs recorded after the release of Vampires of Black Imperial Blood, in 1996. In the liner notes of the release, Meyhna'ch explains he has died due to the lack of competence in the then scene of black metal. This album was officially re-released in 2010 by Dark Adversary Productions (Australia).

== Track listings ==
1. "Suffer the Gestalt" (3:28)
2. "To the Memory of the Dark Countess" (6:33)
3. "Possessed and Immortal" (7:26)
4. "Through the Funeral Maelstrom of Evil" (8:39)
5. "Travels to Sadness, Hate & Depression" (7:54)
6. "The Fear that Freeze" (3:50)
7. "Holocaust in Mourning Dawn (French version)" (5:15)

== Notes ==
- Tracks 1 to 5 are from Evil - The Gestalt of Abomination (1993).
- Tracks 6 & 7 are from 1996.
- The original Drakkar Productions CD release was only printed in 1000 copies.
- The LP release by End All Life Productions in 2002 was only printed in 400, hand-numbered copies. The first 60 copies are printed on white covers with smeared pig blood, while the rest are simply printed red.
