= Dextronaut =

2002 studio album by Velvet Cacoon

Studio album by Velvet Cacoon
- Released: 2002 peer-to-peer release December 2006 (CD Re-release)
- Genre: Black metal, dark ambient
- Length: 38:39
- Producer: Velvet Cacoon

Velvet Cacoon chronology
Dextronaut (2002)	Genevieve (2004)

Dextronaut is the first album by the black metal band Velvet Cacoon, released in 2002 via peer-to-peer platforms. The band claims to have originally recorded and released the album in 1998, but this has been verified by SGL as a lie.

Dextronaut was re-mastered and re-released as a double disc set by Full Moon Productions in December 2006. The first disc does not include tracks 8 and 10. The second disc is three ambient tracks. The discs were lost in the mail, but were later recovered and shipped out again.

In 2010, Khrysanthoney released the album as it was originally made with no remastering and with all ten tracks included. This release did not include the second disc of ambient songs.

== Track listing ==
All songs written by Velvet Cacoon.

1. "Bloodletting" - 1:25
2. "Infinite Plateau" - 3:26
3. "Nest Of Hate" - 5:38
4. "Perched On A Neverending Peak" - 7:08
5. "Setting Off The Twilights" - 4:31
6. "A Year Of Decembers" - 5:55
7. "Reverie" - 3:27
8. "Starlit Seas Of Angel Blood" - 4:21
9. "World Untouched By Mankind" - 2:48
10. "When The Purest Flesh Is Alive in a Heart Full of Hate" - 4:56

Disc Two (2006 CD re-release)

1. "Velorum" - 22:27
2. "Ambient Planet" - 29:04
3. "Nighttime Ice Horizon" - 20:21

== Personnel ==
- Velvet Cacoon - All

== Reception ==
The album generally received negative reviews. Metal Crypt and Toilet ov Hell gave negative reviews, with ToH noting it is one of the lowest rated atmospheric black metal albums on RateYourMusic. The Sound Projector gave a more positive review, praising the "pop-oriented BM edge."
