= Northsuite =

Studio album by Velvet Cacoon
- Released: 2005 CD-R; May 29, 2005 CD; June 2007 LP
- Genre: Black metal, dark ambient
- Length: 61:46
- Label: Ivory Snowfish Music; Full Moon; FMP039; Southern Lord; SUNN68LP
- Producer: Velvet Cacoon

Velvet Cacoon chronology
Genevieve (2004)	Northsuite (2005)	Atropine (2009)

Northsuite is a compilation released by the black metal band Velvet Cacoon. Contains both the "Red Steeples" demo from 2004 and the "Music For Falling Buildings" demo from 2003.

== Release history ==
Original 2005 Ivory Snowfish Music printing limited to 100 Centurian "Of Purest Fire" Pro CD-Rs. Later re-released that year on CD by Full Moon.

LP version released by Southern Lord in June 2007 with a jacket made of velvet with the logo in black foil. Limited to 1500 copies, 500 being marble-purple.

== Track listing ==
No.	Title	Length
1.	"Northsuite"	11:40
2.	"Winterglow"	8:47
3.	"Fire Bloomed From Frost"	4:45
4.	"Chapelflames"	6:42
5.	"Salts & Ashes"	9:08
6.	"Bloodscents"	9:15
7.	"Fire Bloomed From Frost"	5:18
8.	"Dieselflame Novapyre 1892"	6:11
Total length:		61:46

All songs written by Velvet Cacoon. Tracks 1–6 from the "Red Steeples" demo. Tracks 7–8 from the "Music For Falling Buildings" demo.

== Personnel ==
- Josh (8) - vocals, guitar, drum programming
- Angela (4) - guitar
- Dorothy Montoure - mixing

== Trivia ==
The first song on the album, Northsuite, is a slowed down version of the song The Eternal Fragrance Of Roses Part 1 by Mathias Grassow.
