= New False Prophet =

EP by Mütiilation
- Released: 2000
- Recorded: January 2000
- Genre: Black metal
- Labels: End All Life Productions (EAL010)

Mütiilation chronology
Remains of a Ruined, Dead, Cursed Soul (1999)	New False Prophet (2000)	Black Millenium (Grimly Reborn) (2001)

New False Prophet is an EP by black metal band Mütiilation. It was the first Mütiilation release since leaving Les Légions Noires, it's also noted for being the first by the group to feature Meyhna'ch alone on all instruments and vocals. It was released as a 7" vinyl EP in an edition of 300 numbered copies.

== Track listings ==
1. "New False Prophet" (6:45)
2. "Glorious Evil Time" (4:28)
