= Genevieve (album) =

Studio album by Velvet Cacoon
- Released: March 30, 2004 CD; June 2007 LP/CD
- Genre: Black metal, dark ambient
- Length: 55:21
- Label: Full Moon; FMP036; Southern Lord; SUNN67LP; SUNN67CD
- Producer: Velvet Cacoon

Velvet Cacoon chronology
Dextronaut (2002)	Genevieve (2004)	Northsuite (2005)

Genevieve is the second album released by the black metal band Velvet Cacoon.

== Release history ==
CD version released by Full Moon Productions in 2004.

LP version released by Southern Lord in June 2007 with a jacket made of velvet with the logo in silver foil. Limited to 1500 copies, 500 being marble-purple.

There is some controversy concerning copyrights as the track Bete Noir seems to be a pitched down version of the track "Soham" by Mathias Grassow.

== Track listing ==
No.	Title	Length
1.	"1"	6:44
2.	"P.S. Nautical"	6:08
3.	"Avalon Polo"	5:51
4.	"Laudanum"	5:49
5.	"Fauna & Flora"	5:22
6.	"Genevieve"	7:57
7.	"Bete Noir"	17:30

All songs written by Velvet Cacoon.

== Personnel ==
- Velvet Cacoon - All
