= Drakkar Productions =

French record label

- Founded: 1994
- Founder: Noktu
- Genre: Black metal Dark ambient Death metal National Socialist black metal
- Country of origin: France

Drakkar Productions is a French record label that has released many recordings of black metal bands throughout the world, on CD, cassette and vinyl. They have usually limited the prints to 1,000 copies or less, but some have been known to vary. The label is now notorious for its Les Légions Noires releases, as well as other black metal bands that are known throughout the world.

== Overview ==
Drakkar Productions began operation in 1994 when Noktu, a friend of Meyhna'ch, offered to release some Mütiilation material, along with several other Les Légions Noires releases. Les Légions Noires members had a growing interest in having material released officially by labels, who until that point had shown little interest in working with the French underground. Noktu soon after released his own band's material, Celestia, and followed by other acts.

== Bands ==
=== Active Roster ===
- Anxiety
- Arghoslent
- Drama Noir
- Empty
- Celestia
- Goatreich 666
- Hiver Noir
- Imago Mortis
- Interfektor
- Myrkr
- Nåstrond
- Necrosadistic Goat Torture
- Sick
- Vassafor
- Vrolok

=== Past roster ===
- Abigail
- Alcest
- Amaka Hahina
- Black Funeral
- Deathspell Omega
- Grand Belial's Key
- Grima morstua
- Lucifugum
- Mütiilation
- Torgeist
- Vermeth
- Vlad Tepes
- Watain
- Peste Noire

== Catalogue ==
=== DK (cassettes) ===
Cat. Num.	Band	Release	Year
DK001	Anaon	Tenvalijeen	1996
DK002	Seth	Apocalyptic Desires	1996
DK003	Celestia	Evanescence	1997
DK004	Machiavel	Honor, Blood and...Victory	1996
DK005	Funereal Moon	Silent Night of Fullmoon Shine	1995
DK006	Obscure Demon	Crossroad to Hell	1997
DK007	Holocaust	Our Kingdom	1997
DK008	Asmodee	Aequilanx	1997
DK009	Sabnack	Nefandus Pactum	1997
DK010	Yamatu	Ishkur Egishnugal	1998
DK011	Hirilorn/Merrimack	Hirilorn/Merrimack	1998
DK012	Evil	Revenge of Iron and Thunder	1998
DK013	Celestia	A Dying Out Ecstasy	1998
DK014	Malveliance	Eternal Domination	1999
DK015	Count Nosferatu	Soleil Noire	1998
DK016	Helwetti	Unholy Extreme Black	1999
DK017	Garwall	Inhumana Crudelias	1999
DK018	Celestia	Under the Reign of Terror and Tyranny	1999
DK019	Demon Realm	...Of Chaos Damnation and War	1999
DK020	Deathspell Omega	Disciples of the Ultimate Void	1999
DK021	Grimlord	Thought the Hatred of Life	1999
DK022	Nuit Noire	Once Upon the Night	2000
DK023	Perun	The Wolflegion	1999
DK024	Amaka Hahina	Demetria	2001
DK025	Fornication	Sodomize Human Race	2001
DK026	ThyLord	The Earth Last Breath	2001
DK027	Alcest	Tristesse Hivernale	2001
DK028	Slavia	Gloria in Excelsis Sathan	2001
DK029	Celestia	Dead Insecta Sequestration	2001
DK030	Storm Legion	Statement...	2001
DK031	Animus Herilis	Mater Tenebrarum	2002
DK032	Grima Morstua	Essence of Demon's Fire	2003
DK033	Imago Mortis	Mors Triumphalis	2001
DK034	Peste Noire	Macabre Transcendance...	2002
DK035	Nuit Noire	Black Form	2002
DK036	Nuit Noire	Somewhere in the Night Past	2002
DK037	Goatreich 666	Necro Sarcofagus Insanis	2002
DK038	Hiver Noir	Lethal Beings' Muzik	2005
DK039	Interfektor	Symphonie Des Grauens	2005
DK040	Sick	Filth and Ugliness	2005
DK041	Anxiety	Autumn 2004	2005
DK042	Anxiety	The Holocaust Anthem	2005
DK043	Vassafor	Demo I	2005
DK044	Vassafor	Demo II	2005
DK045	Interfektor	Fullmoon Antiquity	2005
DK046	Blood Red Fog	Demo I	2005
DK047	Empty	Eternal Cycle of Decay	2006
DK048	Empty	A Source of Hollow Essence	2006
DK049	Empty	The Last Breath of My Mortal Despair	2006
DK050	BlackSStorm/Pagan Assault	Cruce Signati	2006
DK051	Caïna	The King Beneath	2006
DK052	Caïna	The Cold Taste of Perdition	2006
DK053	Hiver Noir	From the Dead Times of Depression	2006
DK054	SvartKrig	Fimbulvetr	2006
DK055	Dyster	Fallen, Suicided & Forgotten	2006
DK056	Scorn	The Midnight Funeral	2007
DK057	Svartfell	Beyond the Realms of Death	2007
DK058	Svartfell	The Sentence of Satan	2007
DK059	Samayoi	Mournfulness	2007
DK060	Cendres	Ungeziefer	2007
DK061	Emit	A Vision of 1682	2007
DK062	Arghoslent	Hornets of the Pogrom	2008
DK063	Viha	From the Mist...	2007
DK064	Mefitic	Devouring Torment	2007
DK065	Feu Gregeois	Guerres Franques	2007
DK066	Saturnian Mist	Saturnian Mist	2008
DK067	Dyster	Reflet D'Outre-Tombe	2008
DK068	Ciel Nocturne	Season of Solitude	2008
DK069	Xul	Regie Sathanas	2008
DK070	Slavia	Strength and Vision	2008
DK071	Vrolok	Melancholia	2008
DK072	Mefitic	Signing the Servants of God	2009
DK073	Saatkrähe	Of Ravens and Graves...	2009
DK074	Viha	...Into Endless Obscurity	2012
DK075	Grand Belial's Key	Mocking the Philanthropist	2012
DK076	Grand Belial's Key	Judeobeast Assassination	2012
DK077	Grand Belial's Key	Kosherat	2012
DK078	Vlad Tepes/Belkètre	March to the Black Holocaust	2013
DK079	Vlad Tepes	War Funeral March	2013
DK081	Vlad Tepes	The Return of the Unweeping	2013
DK082	Vlad Tepes	Celtic Poetry	2013
DK084	Vlad Tepes	Dans Notre Chute...	2013
DK085	Mütiilation	Vampires of Black Imperial Blood	2017
DK088	Tsjuder	Kill for Satan	2017
DK089	Tsjuder	Demonic Possession	2017
DK090	Vlad Tepes	Winter	2017
DK091	Vlad Tepes	War Funeral March	2017
DK092	Vlad Tepes	The Return of the Unweeping	2017
DK093	Vlad Tepes	Celtic Poetry	2017
DK094	Vlad Tepes	Into Frosty Madness	2017
DK095	Vlad Tepes	An Ode to Our Ruin	2017
DK096	Vlad Tepes	Dans Notre Chute...	2017
DK097	Vlad Tepes	Black Legions Metal	2017
DK098	Vlad Tepes	Morte Lune	2017
DK099	Celestia	Aetherra	2018
DK100	Vèrmyapre Kommando	Vèrmyapre Kommando	2023
DK101	Vèrmyapre Kommando	Crache-La-Mört	2023
DK102	Lepra	Whom Aeons Tore Apart	2017
DK103	Sisyphean	Illusions of Eternity	2018
DK104	Aegrus	Devotion for the Devil	2018
DK106	Sad	Utter Nihil Worship	2018
DK128	Black Murder	Feasts	2023
DK129	Dzlvarv	1996 Demo	2023
DK130	Seviss	Et Pleure Le Bâtard...	2023
DK131	Black Murder	Promo '94	2023
DK148	Vèrmibdrèb	Vèrmibdrèb Zuèrkl Goèbtrevoryalbe	2023
DK205	Graveland	Following the Voice of Blood	2021
DK208	Graveland	In the Glare of Burning Churches	2021
DK219	Mortifera	V: Ecclesia Mortii	2021
DK221	Graveland	Cold Winter Blades	2022
DK222	Graveland	Immortal Pride	2022
DK223	Graveland	Wotan Mit Mir	2022
DK224	Eternal Majesty	From War to Darkness	2022
DK226	Isolated	Hell Denied	2022
DK227	Shitangel	Shithead Metal	2023
DK228	Arghoslent	Hornets of the Pogrom	2022
DK230	Arghoslent	Incorrigible Bigotry	2023
DK232	Grenadier	Trumpets Blare in Blazing Glory	2022
DK233	Vlad Tepes	War Funeral March	2023
DK237	Graveland	The Celtic Winter	2023
DK238	Grand Belial's Key	Judeobeast Assassination	2023
DK246	Dødsfall	När Mörkret Är På Väg	2022
DK247	Grand Belial's Key	Kosherat	2023
DK253	Vlad Tepes/Belkètre	March to the Black Holocaust	2023
DK255	Graveland	1050 Years of Pagan Cult	2023
DK260	Chamber of Mirrors	Moonlight Decay	2023
DK263	Dødsfall	Djevelens Evangelie	2023
DK295	Celestia	Forever Gone	2025
DK325	Gestapo 666	Swastika of Satan	2025
DK326	Cachot D'Effroi	Dans Le Cimetière Abandonné	2025
DK327	Grenadier	Wolves of the Trenches	2025

=== DKCD (Compact Discs) ===
Cat. Num.	Band	Release	Year
DKCD001	Mütiilation	Vampires of Black Imperial Blood	1995
DKCD002	Vlad Tepes/Torgeist	Black Legions Metal	1996
DKCD003	Nahash	Wellone Aeternitas	1997
DKCD004	Anaon	Les Rites de Cromlech	1997
DKCD005	Hirilorn	Legends of Evil and Eternal Death	1998
DKCD006	Celestia	A Cave Full of Bats	1999
DKCD007	Warloghe	The First Possession	1999
DKCD008	Mütiilation	Remains of a Ruined, Dead, Cursed Soul	1999
DKCD009	Decayed	The Book of Darkness	1999
DKCD010	Various Artists	The Return Of Darkness & Hate	2000
DKCD011	Tsjuder	Kill for Satan	2000
DKCD012	Watain	Rabid Death's Curse	2000
DKCD013	Impiety	Skullfucking Armageddon	2000
DKCD014	Mütiilation	Black Millenium (Grimly Reborn)	2001
DKCD015	Decayed	Nockthurnaal	2001
DKCD016	Unpure	Trinity in Black	2001
DKCD017	Grand Belial's Key	Judeobeast Assassination	2001
DKCD018	Vermeth	Your Ruin...	2001
DKCD019	Abigail	Welcome All Hellfuckers	2001
DKCD020	Sathanas	Cruentus Diabolos	2002
DKCD021	Seeds of Hate	Persecution of Christian Filth	2002
DKCD022	Atomizer	Death - Mutation - Disease - Annihilation	2002
DKCD023	Arghoslent	Incorrigible Bigotry	2002
DKCD024	Tsjuder	Demonic Possession	2002
DKCD025	Primigenium	Intolerance	2002
DKCD026	Amaka Hahina	Aheah Saergathan!	2002
DKCD027	Decayed	The Beast Has Risen	2003
DKCD028	Altar of Perversion	From Dead Temples (Towards the Ast'ral Path)	2003
DKCD029	Anwyl	Postmortem Apocalypse	2003
DKCD030	Armagedda	Only True Believers	2003
DKCD031	Abigail	Forever Street Metal Bitch	2003
DKCD032	Watain	Casus Luciferi	2003
DKCD033	Lucifugum	Stigma Egoism	2004
DKCD034	Blackdeath	Satan Macht Frei	2004
DKCD035	Alcest	Le Secret	2005
DKCD036	Vrolok	Soul Amputation	2005
DKCD037	Black Funeral	Vampyr - Throne of the Beast	2005
DKCD038	Grand Belial's Key	Kosherat	2005
DKCD039	Imago Mortis	Una Foresta Dimenticata	2006
DKCD040	Grima Morstua	Illustratio Per Horribilem Obscuritatem	2007
DKCD041	Myrkr	Offspring of Gathered Foulness	2007
DKCD042	Decayed/Thugnor	Satanic Blast/At the Gates...	2007
DKCD043	Abigail	The Early Black Years (1992-1995)	2007
DKCD044	Grand Belial's Key	Mocking the Philanthropist	2006
DKCD045	Loits	Ei Kahetse Midagi	2009
DKCD046	Mantak	Sabahell's Blasphemer	2007
DKCD047	Arghoslent	1990-1994: The First Three Demos	2008
DKCD048	Arghoslent	Galloping Through the Battle Ruins	2007
DKCD049	Arghoslent	Hornets of the Pogrom	2008
DKCD050	Vrolok	Void (The Divine Abortion)	2007
DKCD051	Torgeist	Devoted to Satan	2008
DKCD052	Torgeist	Time of Sabbath	2008
DKCD053	Arghoslent/Martial Barrage	Send Forth the Best Ye Breed	2009
DKCD054	Obscuro	Where Obscurity Dwells	2008
DKCD055	Slavia	Strength and Vision	2007
DKCD056	Nidsang	The Mark of Death	2007
DKCD057	Arcanus Tenebrae	Odium In Homines	2008
DKCD058	Imago Mortis	Mors Triumphalis	2007
DKCD059	Vermeth	Suicide Or Be Killed!	2008
DKCD060	Arcanus Tenebrae	Summa Essentia Obscura	2009
DKCD061	Slugathor	Echoes from Beneath	2009
DKCD062	Imago Mortis	Ars Obscura	2009
DKCD063	Svartfell	Day of the Unholy Massacre	2009
DKCD064	Dyster	Le Cycle Sénescent	2010
DKCD065	Slavia	Integrity and Victory	2011
DKCD066	Patria	Liturgia Haeresis	2011
DKCD067	Blackhorned Saga	Broken Messiah	2011
DKCD068	The Last Twilight	La Octava Copa de Ira	2011
DKCD069	Necrosadistic Goat Torture	Armageddon Shall Come	2012
DKCD070	Dyster	Phase Terminale	2012
DKCD071	Vlad Tepes/Belkètre	March to the Black Holocaust	2013
DKCD072	Vlad Tepes	War Funeral March	2013
DKCD073	Vlad Tepes	Morte Lune	2013
DKCD074	Patria	Nihil est Monastica	2013
DKCD075	Vlad Tepes	Anthologie Noire	2013
DKCD076	Patria/Xeper	Divide et Impera	2013
DKCD077	Beastcraft	Into the Burning Pit of Hell	2013
DKCD078	Beastcraft	Dawn of the Serpent	2013
DKCD079	Beastcraft	Baptised in Blood and Goatsemen	2013
DKCD080	Nuit Noire	Depths of Night: Collection of the Early Demo Tapes	2014
DKCD081	Patria	Hymns of Victory and Death	2014
DKCD082	Mortifera	Bleüu de Morte	2014
DKCD083	Vlad Tepes	Winter	2014
DKCD084	Vlad Tepes	Celtic Poetry	2014
DKCD085	Vlad Tepes	Into Frosty Madness	2014
DKCD086	Imago Mortis	Carnicon	2014
DKCD087	Arcanus Tenebrae	Triumphus Atri Sanguinis	2014
DKCD088	Mortifera	IV: Sanctii Tristhess	2014
DKCD089	Vlad Tepes	Dans Notre Chute...	2014
DKCD090	Vlad Tepes	Morte Lune	2014
DKCD091	Vlad Tepes	The Return of the Unweeping	2014
DKCD092	Luvart	Rites of the Ancient Cults	2015
DKCD093	Aegrus	Devotion for the Devil	2015
DKCD094	Vlad Tepes	The Drakksteim Sessions	2015
DKCD095	Nadiwrath	Circle of Pest	2015
DKCD096	Miasthenia	Legados do Inframundo	2015
DKCD097	Spell Forest	Amentia Ludibrium Tenebris	2016
DKCD098	Arghoslent	Arsenal of Glory	2015
DKCD099	Sad	Utter Nihil Worship	2016
DKCD100	Vèrmyapre Kommando	Vèrmyapre Kommando	2016
DKCD101	Vèrmyapre Kommando	Crache-la-Mört	2016
DKCD102	Fornication	Sectanik Neocide/Sodomize Human Race	2017
DKCD103	Ahpdegma	Seolfkwyllen	2016
DKCD104	Nahash	Daath	2016
DKCD105	Nahash	Nocticula Hecate	2016
DKCD106	Balfor	Black Serpent Rising	2017
DKCD107	Enepsigos	Plague of Plagues	2017
DKCD108	Celestia	Aetherra	2017
DKCD109	Spell Forest	Candelarum	2017
DKCD110	Lepra	Whom Aeons Tore Apart	2017
DKCD111	Sisyphean	Illusions of Eternity	2017
DKCD112	Nycteriis	L'Ombre D'Un Traumatisme Noir	2018
DKCD113	Vulturine	Pangyric ov Death - The Synoptic Picture ov Negativism	2018
DKCD114	Vulturine	Ossos...Ódio & Angústia	2018
DKCD115	Vulturine/Ain Sof Aur	Qliphotic Death Worship	2018
DKCD116	Sacrificia Mortuorum	Possède La Bête	2018
DKCD117	Luvart	Ruler of Chaos	2018
DKCD118	Lutomysl	Decadence	2018
DKCD119	Lutomysl	Catharsis	2018
DKCD120	Lutomysl	De Profundis	2018
DKCD121	Lutomysl	Ecce Homo	2018
DKCD122	Vrolok	Through the Gates of Eternal Dejection	2018
DKCD123	Dark Messiah	Echoes of War	2019
DKCD124	Defecrator	Abortion of Humanity	2019
DKCD125	Svatan	Blazing Winds of Transcendence	2019
DKCD126	Creptum	Vama	2020
DKCD127	Gestapo 666	Satanic Shariah	2019
DKCD128	Black Murder	Feasts	2019
DKCD129	Dzlvarv	1996 Demo	2019
DKCD130	Seviss	Et Pleure Le Bâtard...	2019
DKCD131	Black Murder	Promo '94	2020
DKCD132	Imago Mortis	Ossa Mortuorum e Monumentis Resurrectura	2020
DKCD134	Epheles	Dead Nature for Humans Without Tears	2021
DKCD135	Epheles	Les Anges De La Dernière Scene	2021
DKCD136	Epheles	L'Ombre De La Croix	2021
DKCD137	Epheles	Souviens-Toi	2021
DKCD138	Order of the Death's Head	Les Temps Maudits	2020
DKCD139	Outlaw	The Fire in My Tomb	2020
DKCD140	Pactum	Nigredo	2020
DKCD141	Oldowan Gash	Hubris Unchained	2020
DKCD142	Slugathor	Circle of Death	2020
DKCD143	Slugathor	Unleashing the Slugathron	2020
DKCD144	Abigail	Intercourse and Lust	2020
DKCD145	Spell Forest	Cadent in Aeternum: The Dark Spell Forest	2020
DKCD146	Spell Forest	Lucifer Rex	2020
DKCD147	Anguis Dei	Angeist	2020
DKCD148	Vèrmibdrèb	Vèrmibdrèb Zuèrkl Goèbtrevoryalbe	2021
DKCD150	Vulthum	Shadowvoid	2021
DKCD151	Outlaw	Death Miasma	2021
DKCD152	Enterré Vivant	Les Ténèbres Ne Sont Pas Formées D'Ombre	2021
DKCD153	Speedböozer	Still Ugly, Still Pissed, Still Hate You	2021
DKCD154	Ungoliantha	The Howl in the Waste	2021
DKCD155	Clamosum	Kosmoksen Morsian	2021
DKCD156	Warhammer	Ashes and Cinders	2021
DKCD157	Diabolos	Diabolos	2022
DKCD158	Solaris	Montessor	2021
DKCD159	Eishalle/Ancient Necromancy	Forbidden Sorcery in the Frostbitten Night	2021
DKCD160	Gravelust	Passage to the End	2022
DKCD161	Iluzja	Iluzja	2022
DKCD162	Okkultum Magnificentia	Okkultum Magnificentia	2022
DKCD163	Desolate Midwinter	Mental Anguish	2022
DKCD164	Certa Mortis	Tenebrae Mortis Aeternae	2022
DKCD165	Militia Templi	L'Ordre De La Croix De Lumière	2022
DKCD166	Vulturine	Cântico Gangrenoso	2022
DKCD167	Ad Astra	Harvest	2024
DKCD168	Windhelm	Au Crépuscule De L'Existence	2022
DKCD169	Amthrÿa	Passage	2022
DKCD170	Dëgénéréscence	...Ainsi! Nous Dansâmes Aux Limbes Détestées	2022
DKCD171	Triangulum	Victory in Death	2022
DKCD172	Funayùrei	Soleil Brisé	2022
DKCD173	Imago Mortis/Mortifera	Ostenoir	2022
DKCD174	Gestapo 666	Zyklon B Vaccine	2022
DKCD175	Certa Mortis	Ab Inferno Ad Astra	2022
DKCD176	Dolchstoss	War is Eternal	2022
DKCD177	Mornoss	Solitude	2022
DKCD178	Diabolos	La Porte De L'Enfer	2022
DKCD179	Mondocane/Goatworship	Enigmata/The Eminent	2023
DKCD180	Elderblood	Achrony	2021
DKCD181	Morkesagn	Dragon's Lair	2021
DKCD182	Le Prochain Hiver	Hiver '96	2021
DKCD183	Hunferd	Hunferd	2021
DKCD184	Drama Noir/Morgenröthe	Morna/Possenspiel	2021
DKCD185	Alcahest	Alcahest	2021
DKCD186	Bömber	Black Ultra Anarchy	2021
DKCD187	Vollmond	Wolves in Turmoil	2021
DKCD188	Coven of Impurity	Gnosis From the Kingdom Below	2021
DKCD189	Estve	Egyenes Labirintus	2021
DKCD190	Svartfell	Léviathan Cauchemar	2021
DKCD191	Goathead	Storms of Ancient Fire	2021
DKCD192	Ossements	I	2021
DKCD193	Morgenröthe	Morgenröthe	2020
DKCD194	Necrofagore	Into the Gloom of the Buried Valley	2021
DKCD194	Astrofaes	Idea. Form. Essence...	2021
DKCD195	Drama Noir	Princess Airam	2020
DKCD196	Abvulabashy	Atomik Triumphator Elite	2020
DKCD197	Vetüs Khlystii	Transverberare	2020
DKCD198	Moonlight	Farewell to Sunlight	2020
DKCD199	Nuclear Cthulhu	Demonic Laughter	2020
DKCD200	Inthyflesh	Crawl Beneath Our Shadow	2020
DKCD201	Drama Noir	A Necromancy Lore	2020
DKCD202	Ordo Ad Chao	Fear the Invisible	2020
DKCD203	Astrofaes	Ancestors' Shadows	2020
DKCD204	Astrofaes	...Those Whose Past is Immortal	2021
DKCD205	Graveland	Following the Voice of Blood	2021
DKCD206	Recluse	Stillbirth in Bethlehem	2021
DKCD207	Astrofaes	The Attraction: Heavens and Earth	2021
DKCD208	Graveland	In the Glare of Burning Churches	2021
DKCD209	Order of the Death's Head	Hakenkreuz	2022
DKCD210	Order of the Death's Head	Pogrom Ritual	2022
DKCD211	Order of the Death's Head	Soldat Inconnu	2022
DKCD212	Astrofaes	Heritage	2021
DKCD213	Zépülkr	Héritrage Posthume	2021
DKCD214	Blackdeath	Saturn Sector	2022
DKCD215	Blackdeath	Satan Macht Frei	2022
DKCD216	Blackdeath	Vortex	2022
DKCD217	Celestia/Black Draugwath	Split 666	2021
DKCD218	Ossements	II	2021
DKCD219	Mortifera	V: Ecclesia Mortii	2021
DKCD220	Burialkult	Infernal Death Manifest	2022
DKCD221	Graveland	Cold Winter Blades	2023
DKCD222	Graveland	Immortal Pride	2022
DKCD223	Graveland	Wotan Mit Mir	2022
DKCD224	Eternal Majesty	From War to Darkness	2022
DKCD226	Isolated	Hell Denied	2022
DKCD227	Shitangel	Shithead Metal	2022
DKCD228	Arghoslent	Hornets of the Pogrom	2022
DKCD229	Ossements	III	2022
DKCD230	Arghoslent	Incorrigible Bigotry	2022
DKCD231	Sternatis	Blazebirth Hall	2022
DKCD232	Grenadier	Trumpets Blare in Blazing Glory	2022
DKCD233	Vlad Tepes	War Funeral March	2023
DKCD234	Slugathor	Crypt of the Ancient Fire	2022
DKCD235	Darkest Oath	Daemonic Pyre ov Gnosis	2022
DKCD236	Gestapo 666	Satanic Terrorism	2022
DKCD237	Graveland	The Celtic Winter	2023
DKCD238	Grand Belial's Key	Judeobeast Assassination	2022
DKCD239	Empty	Omnia Amet Lorem	2022
DKCD240	Infernal Execrator	Ad Infinitum Satanic Adherent	2023
DKCD244	Genocide Kommando	Black Metal Supremacy	2022
DKCD245	Genocide Kommando	Anthems of Mass Massacre	2022
DKCD246	Dødsfall	När Mörkret Är På Väg	2022
DKCD247	Grand Belial's Key	Kosherat	2023
DKCD248	Catechon	Sangue Del Martire	2023
DKCD249	Empty	A Source of Hollow Essence	2023
DKCD250	Noctilucent	Hollow Moon	2023
DKCD251	Ad Omega	Aphelic Ascent	2023
DKCD252	Orgasm 666	Blood Vagina Angel	2023
DKCD253	Vlad Tepes/Belkètre	March to the Black Holocaust	2023
DKCD254	Ascending Olympus	Frontlines	2023
DKCD255	Graveland	1050 Years of Pagan Cult	2023
DKCD256	Tattva	Abysmes	2023
DKCD257	Ossements	IV	2023
DKCD258	Epheles	Promesses	2023
DKCD259	Usurpr	Marauders of the Ascendant	2023
DKCD260	Chamber of Mirrors	Moonlight Decay	2023
DKCD261	Chamber of Mirrors	Shadow Kingdom	2023
DKCD262	Anguis Dei/Hakuja	Amphisbaena	2023
DKCD263	Dødsfall	Djevelens Evangelie	2023
DKCD264	Shadows of Algol	Transformation of the Desert Witch	2023
DKCD265	Strixskog	The Hell We Have Chosen	2023
DKCD266	Morsure	Naissance D'Un Empire	2023
DKCD267	Median Omega	Insolence	2023
DKCD268	Eclipsus	Sullen . Euphoria	2023
DKCD269	Domini Inferi	Reversed Prayers	2023
DKCD270	Moontower	Spirits of the Antichrist	2024
DKCD271	Moontower	Voices of the Unholy Land	2024
DKCD272	Moontower	Infernal Revelation	2024
DKCD273	Kyy	Apotheosis: The Light of All Lights	2023
DKCD274	Øksehovud	Makt, Høyhet, Herredømme	2023
DKCD275	Vorgfang	Skammens Stein	2023
DKCD276	Khors	The Flame of Eternity's Decline	2024
DKCD277	Khors	Cold	2024
DKCD278	Khors	Mysticism	2024
DKCD279	Khors	Return to Abandoned	2024
DKCD280	Khors	Abandoned Leaves	2024
DKCD281	Khors	Wisdom of Centuries	2024
DKCD282	Khors	Night Falls onto the Fronts of Ours	2024
DKCD283	Khors	Beyond the Bestial	2024
DKCD284	Khors	Where the Word Acquires Eternity	2024
DKCD285	Moonlight	Skogstronen	2024
DKCD286	Skalf	Vallis Decia: Le Voci Dei Dispersi	2023
DKCD287	Mondocane	Ultima	2024
DKCD288	Noire Plume	France Déchue	2024
DKCD289	Luvart	Until the Void	2023
DKCD290	Spell Forest	Catastrophe Altar	2024
DKCD291	Umbra Noctis	Asylum	2024
DKCD292	Order of the Death's Head	Vril Blitz Ultima	2024
DKCD293	Sylvan Awe	Offering	2023
DKCD293-2	Dolchstoss	Embers of the Fallen	2024
DKCD294	Sylvan Awe	Pilgrimage	2023
DKCD294-2	Cachot D'Effroi	Cachot D'Effroi	2024
DKCD295	Celestia	Forever Gone	2025
DKCD296	The Stone	Neke Rane Krvare Večno	2024
DKCD297	The Stone	Slovenska Krv	2024
DKCD298	The Stone	Zakon Velesa	2024
DKCD299	The Stone	Magla	2024
DKCD300	The Stone	Umro	2024
DKCD301	The Stone	Golet	2024
DKCD302	The Stone	Nekroza	2024
DKCD303	The Stone	Teatar Apsurda	2024
DKCD304	Ludus Umbrarum	Reveria Umbrarum In Tenebris	2025
DKCD305	Sum Herald	Sum Herald on Earth	2024
DKCD306	Domus Dei Satanae	King Paimon	2024
DKCD307	Avzhia	Fear of My Existence	2024
DKCD308	Windhelm	Chroniques D'Un Non-Mort	2024
DKCD309	Vulthum	The Tyrant Tale	2025
DKCD310	Emberfrost	The Dying God	2024
DKCD311	Diabolos	Le Sang Des Morts	2024
DKCD312	Mesfetor	Manifest II	2025
DKCD313	Apocryphal	Dissolution of God	2024
DKCD314	Chamber of Mirrors	Demonic Realm	2024
DKCD315	Certa Mortis	Diluvium	2024
DKCD316	Khors	Letters to the Future Self	2024
DKCD317	Khashm	Mysterium Mortis	2025
DKCD318	Nöldr	When Glory Disappears	2025
DKCD319	Gestapo 666	Black Gestapo Metal	2025
DKCD320	Gestapo 666	Nostalghia	2025
DKCD321	Gestapo 666	Satanic Shariah	2025
DKCD322	Gestapo 666	Satanic Terrorism	2025
DKCD323	Gestapo 666	Zyklon B Vaccine	2025
DKCD324	Vouïvre/Gestapo 666	Vouïvre/Gestapo 666	2025
DKCD325	Gestapo 666	Swastika of Satan	2025
DKCD326	Cachot D'Effroi	Dans Le Cimetière Abandonné	2025
DKCD327	Grenadier	Wolves of the Trenches	2025

=== DKLP (Vinyl LPs) ===
Cat. Num.	Band	Release	Year
DKLP000	Arghoslent	Incorrigible Bigotry	2002
DKLP001	Tsjuder	Demonic Possession	2002
DKLP002	Primigenium	Intolerance	2002
DKLP003	Torgeist	Devoted to Satan	2003
DKLP004	Torgeist	Time of Sabbath	2003
DKLP005	Grand Belial's Key	Kosherat	2005
DKLP006	Myrkr	Offspring of Gathered Foulness	2005
DKLP007	Tsjuder	Kill for Satan	2005
DKLP008	Anwyl	Postmortem Apocalypse	2005
DKLP009	Vlad Tepes/Torgeist	Black Legions Metal	2004
DKLP010	Arghoslent	Hornets of the Pogrom	2008
DKLP011	Armagedda	Only True Believers	2011
DKLP012	Loits	Ei Kahetse Midagi	2009
DKLP013	Arghoslent/Martial Barrage	Send Forth the Best Ye Breed	2009
DKLP014	Slavia	Strength and Vision	2008
DKLP015	Grand Belial's Key	Mocking the Philanthropist	2012
DKLP016	Grand Belial's Key	Judeobeast Assassination	2012
DKLP017	Vermeth	Suicide Or Be Killed!	2008
DKLP018	Abigail	Forever Street Metal	2009
DKLP019	Slugathor	Echoes from Beneath	2009
DKLP020	Abigail	Welcome All Hellfuckers	2010
DKLP021	Slavia	Integrity and Victory	2011
DKLP022	Patria	Liturgia Haeresis	2011
DKLP023	Mütiilation	Vampires of Black Imperial Blood	2012
DKLP024	Mütiilation	Remains of a Ruined, Dead, Cursed Soul	2012
DKLP025	Mütiilation	Black Millenium (Grimly Reborn)	2012
DKLP026	Vlad Tepes/Belkètre	March to the Black Holocaust	2013
DKLP027	Vlad Tepes	War Funeral March	2013
DKLP028	Vlad Tepes	Morte Lune	2013
DKLP029	Vlad Tepes	The Return of the Unweeping	2013
DKLP030	Vlad Tepes	Celtic Poetry	2013
DKLP031	Vlad Tepes	Into Frosty Madness	2013
DKLP032	Vlad Tepes	Dans Notre Chute...	2013
DKLP033	Arcanus Tenebrae	Odium In Homines	2013
DKLP034	Arcanus Tenebrae	Summa Essentia Obscura	2013
DKLP035	Patria	Nihil est Monastica	2013
DKLP036	Arghoslent	Galloping Through the Battle Ruins	2016
DKLP037	Arghoslent	Incorrigible Bigotry	2016
DKLP038	Arghoslent	Arsenal of Glory	2016
DKLP039	Arghoslent	1990-1994: The First Three Demos	2016
DKLP040	Vèrmyapre Kommando	Vèrmyapre Kommando	2016
DKLP041	Vèrmyapre Kommando	Crache-la-Mört	2016
DKLP042	Nahash	Daath	2016
DKLP043	Aegrus	Devotion for the Devil	2018
DKLP044	Nadiwrath	Circle of Pest	2017
DKLP045	Sad	Utter Nihil Worship	2017
DKLP046	Lepra	Whom Aeons Tore Apart	2017
DKLP047	Sisyphean	Illusions of Eternity	2017
DKLP048	Celestia	Aetherra	2017
DKLP049	Ljosazabojstwa	Staražytnaje Licha	2018
DKLP050	Nycteriis	L'Ombre D'Un Traumatisme Noir	2018
DKLP051	Sacrificia Mortuorum	Possède La Bête	2018
DKLP052	Lutomysl	Decadence	2018
DKLP053	Lutomysl	Catharsis	2018
DKLP054	Lutomysl	De Profundis	2018
DKLP055	Lutomysl	Ecce Homo	2018
DKLP056	Beastcraft	Into the Burning Pit of Hell	2019
DKLP057	Beastcraft	Dawn of the Serpent	2019
DKLP058	Beastcraft	Baptised in Blood and Goatsemen	2019
DKLP059	Dark Messiah	Echoes of War	2019
DKLP060	Defecrator	Abortion of Humanity	2019
DKLP061	Black Murder	Feasts	2019
DKLP062	Dzlvarv	1996 Demo	2019
DKLP063	Seviss	Et Pleure Le Bâtard...	2019
DKLP064	Black Murder	Promo '94	2019
DKLP065	Gestapo 666	Satanic Shariah	2019
DKLP067	Imago Mortis	Ossa Mortuorum e Monumentis Resurrectura	2020
DKLP068	Mortifera	Maledictiih	2020
DKLP069	Mortifera	Vastiia Tenebrd Mortifera	2020
DKLP070	Mortifera	Bleüu de Morte	2020
DKLP071	Abigail	Intercourse and Lust	2020
DKLP072	Epheles	Dead Nature for Humans Without Tears	2020
DKLP073	Epheles	Les Anges De La Dernière Scène	2020
DKLP074	Epheles	L'Ombre De La Croix	2020
DKLP075	Epheles	Souviens-Toi	2020
DKLP076	Epheles	Je Suis Autrefois	2020
DKLP077	Order of the Death's Head	Les Temps Maudits	2020
DKLP078	Vouïvre/Gestapo 666	Vouïvre/Gestapo 666	2020
DKLP079	Oldowan Gash	Hubris Unchained	2020
DKLP080	Slugathor	Circle of Death	2020
DKLP081	Slugathor	Unleashing the Slugathron	2020
DKLP082	Anguis Dei	Angeist	2020
DKLP083	Vèrmibdrèb	Vèrmibdrèb Zuèrkl Goèbtrevoryalbe	2021
DKLP128	Black Murder	Feasts	2023
DKLP176	Dolchstoss	War is Eternal	2023
DKLP194	Astrofaes	Idea. Form. Essence...	2022
DKLP195	Astrofaes	Knowing No Dawn	2021
DKLP196	Shitangel	Demo XXX	2021
DKLP197	Astrofaes	The Eyes of the Beast	2021
DKLP198	Astrofaes	Dying Emotions Domain	2021
DKLP199	Burshtyn	Chthonichasm	2021
DKLP200	Inthyflesh	Crawl Beneath Our Shadow	2020
DKLP201	Drama Noir	A Necromancy Lore	2020
DKLP202	Ordo Ad Chao	Fear the Invisible	2020
DKLP203	Astrofaes	Ancestors' Shadows	2020
DKLP204	Astrofaes	...Those Whose Past is Immortal	2021
DKLP205	Graveland	Following the Voice of Blood	2021
DKLP206	Recluse	Stillbirth in Bethlehem	2022
DKLP207	Astrofaes	The Attraction: Heavens and Earth	2021
DKLP208	Graveland	In the Glare of Burning Churches	2021
DKLP209	Order of the Death's Head	Hakenkreuz	2022
DKLP210	Order of the Death's Head	Pogrom Ritual	2022
DKLP211	Order of the Death's Head	Soldat Inconnu	2022
DKLP212	Astrofaes	Heritage	2022
DKLP213	Zépülkr	Héritrage Posthume	2022
DKLP214	Blackdeath	Saturn Sector	2022
DKLP215	Blackdeath	Satan Macht Frei	2022
DKLP216	Blackdeath	Vortex	2022
DKLP217	Celestia/Black Draugwath	Split 666	2022
DKLP218	Ossements	II	2022
DKLP219	Mortifera	V: Ecclesia Mortii	2021
DKLP220	Burialkult	Infernal Death Manifest	2022
DKLP221	Graveland	Cold Winter Blades	2023
DKLP222	Graveland	Immortal Pride	2023
DKLP223	Graveland	Wotan Mit Mir	2022
DKLP224	Eternal Majesty	From War to Darkness	2022
DKLP225	Order of the Death's Head	Reliques	2022
DKLP226	Isolated	Hell Denied	2022
DKLP227	Shitangel	Shithead Metal	2023
DKLP228	Arghoslent	Hornets of the Pogrom	2022
DKLP229	Ossements	III	2022
DKLP230	Arghoslent	Incorrigible Bigotry	2023
DKLP231	Sternatis	Blazebirth Hall	2023
DKLP232	Grenadier	Trumpets Blare in Blazing Glory	2023
DKLP233	Vlad Tepes	War Funeral March	2023
DKLP234	Slugathor	Crypt of the Ancient Fire	2023
DKLP236	Gestapo 666	Satanic Terrorism	2022
DKLP237	Graveland	The Celtic Winter	2023
DKLP238	Grand Belial's Key	Judeobeast Assassination	2023
DKLP241	Funeral	Black Flame of Unholy Hate	2022
DKLP242	Seigneur Voland	Consumatum Est	2022
DKLP243	Seigneur Voland	Black Metal Blitzkrieg	2022
DKLP246	Dødsfall	När Mörkret Är På Väg	2023
DKLP247	Grand Belial's Key	Kosherat	2023
DKLP252	Orgasm 666	Blood Vagina Angel	2023
DKLP253	Vlad Tepes/Belkètre	March to the Black Holocaust	2023
DKLP255	Graveland	1050 Years of Pagan Cult	2023
DKLP257	Ossements	IV	2023
DKLP258	Epheles	Promesses	2023
DKLP259	Usurpr	Marauders of the Ascendant	2023
DKLP260	Chamber of Mirrors	Moonlight Decay	2023
DKLP263	Dødsfall	Djevelens Evangelie	2023
DKLP269	Domini Inferi	Reversed Prayers	2023
DKLP270	Moontower	Spirits of the Antichrist	2024
DKLP271	Moontower	Voices of the Unholy Land	2024
DKLP272	Moontower	Infernal Revelation	2024
DKLP273	Kyy	Apotheosis: The Light of All Lights	2023
DKLP292	Order of the Death's Head	Vril Blitz Ultima	2024
DKLP293	Dolchstoss	Embers of the Fallen	2024
DKLP294-2B	Cachot D'Effroi	Cachot D'Effroi	2024
DKLP295	Celestia	Forever Gone	2025
DKLP315	Certa Mortis	Diluvium	2024
DKLP316	Khors	Letters to the Future Self	2024
DKLP317	Khashm	Mysterium Mortis	2025
DKLP325	Gestapo 666	Swastika of Satan	2025
DKLP326	Cachot D'Effroi	Dans Le Cimetière Abandonné	2025
DKLP327	Grenadier	Wolves of the Trenches	2025

=== DKMLP (10" Vinyl "Mini LP") ===
Cat. Num.	Band	Release	Year
DKMLP001	Morbid Upheaval/Abigail	Morbid Upheaval/Abigail	2006
DKMLP002	Goatreich 666/Mefitic	Paintime/Poisonous Transcendence	2008
DKMLP003	Mefitic/Necrovomit	Misled Conjunction of Evil	2010
DKMLP262	Anguis Dei/Hakuja	Amphisbaena	2023

=== DKEP (7" Vinyl EPs) ===
Cat. Num.	Band	Release	Year
DKEP001	Celestia	Evoking Grâce and Splendour	2001
DKEP002	Decayed	Satanic Blast	2002
DKEP003	Corpus Christii	Master of...	2002
DKEP004	Nuit Noire	Luttina	2002
DKEP005	Slavia	Norwegian Black Terror Assault	2005
DKEP006	Nunslaughter	Hell on France	2004
DKEP007	Grima Morstua	Repulsive Sounds of Satanic Worship	2005
DKEP008	Goatreich 666	Funeral of Nameless Angels	2005
DKEP009	Grand Belial's Key	On a Mule Rides the Swindler	2005
DKEP010	Vassafor	Southern Vassaforian Hell	2006
DKEP011	Nidsang	Streams of Darkness	2008
DKEP012	Sorts	Sorts	2011
DKEP013	Arcanus Tenebrae	Abyssum Invocare	2011
DKEP014	Diamatregon	...To Death	2012
DKEP015	Mefitic	Columns of Subsidence	2012
DKEP016	Imago Mortis	Sgàbula	2012
DKEP017	Loits	Raiugem Ruunideks	2013
