= Mütiilation =

French black metal project

- Origin: Grabels, France
- Genres: Black metal
- Years active: 1991–1996, 2000–2009, 2014–2017, 2024–present
- Labels: Drakkar Productions; End All Life Productions
- Members: Meyhna'ch; Kham

Mütiilation is a French black metal project, traditionally known as a group, but later reduced to a solo act that consisted solely of founder William "Meyhna'ch" Roussel who maintained activity under the name until its closing in 2017. He later reactivated the band in March 2024. Mütiilation has released eight full-length albums and appeared on several EPs and compilations.

== History ==
Mütiilation was founded in 1991 by Meyhna'ch, drummer Dark Wizzard of Silence and bassist David. They recorded a few demos as a trio until 1993, when David left due to Mütiilation becoming the first band of the Black Legions (Les Légions Noires), an underground collective of French black metal musicians active in the early 1990s. At this time, Mütiilation released an EP to honor the circle titled Hail Satanas We Are the Black Legions.

Shortly after, Dark Wizzard of Silence was replaced by Krissagrazabeth, who recorded with the band up to Vampires of Black Imperial Blood. Once again, he left due to disagreements with the Black Legions. On the contrary, Mørdrëd, who played bass, was properly admitted into the circle; this line-up was featured in The Black Plague – First Chapter (And Maybe Last One).

In 1999, Drakkar Productions released a compilation of unreleased material, Remains of a Ruined, Dead, Cursed Soul. The album stated that Meyhna'ch was "dead" due to disgust with the black metal scene. However, in 2001, Mütiilation came back with the release of Black Millenium (Grimly Reborn), with another scathing message directed at the scene. The band had become a solo project, and Meyhna'ch still used the Black Legions' emblem on some releases.

Mütiilation then followed with two performances with acts such as Impiety, Abigail, Decayed, Tsjuder, Watain and Judas Iscariot. During this time Noktu, Fureiss and Astrelya from Celestia served as live members, filling in for guitars and drums. TND played bass at the gig in Marseille, yet could not perform in Germendorf.

Following three more studio albums and a split with Satanic Warmaster and Drowning the Light, Meyhna'ch quietly deactivated Mütiilation. Despite a one-off performance at the 2015 edition of Hellfest, Meyhna'ch has carried on with new music under his own alias, and maintains that Mütiilation is "dead".

In March 2024, on a Facebook post, Meyhna’ch announced he has revived the project, and that a seventh studio album is due to be released.. Since then, as of March 29th, 2024, the album has been released under the title Black Metal Cult. The album was described as "utterly uncompromising", expressing "the sense of tragic drama and hopelessness".

== Musical style ==
Mütiilation's music is characterized by a raw, lo-fi production style typical of the early French black metal underground. Their work includes minimalism, distorted instrumentation, and bleak atmospheres.

== Members ==
=== Current ===
- Meyhna'ch – bass, guitar, drum programming, vocals (1991–1996, 2000–2009, 2009–2017, 2024–Present)
- Kham – drums (2024–Present)

=== Former ===
- Dark Wizzard of Silence – drums (1992–1994)
- David – bass (1992–1994)
- Krissagrazabeth – drums (1994)
- Mørdrëd – bass (1995)
- TND – bass (2001)
- Andy Julia – drums (2001)
- Cyril Mendre – guitar (2001)
- Fureiss Frank – guitar (2001)
- Azk.6 – drums (2015–2017)
- Reverend Prick – bass (2015–2017)
- Patrice Duthoo – guitar (2015–2017)

== Discography ==
=== Albums ===
- Vampires of Black Imperial Blood (1995)
- Remains of a Ruined, Dead, Cursed Soul (1999)
- Black Millenium (Grimly Reborn) (2001)
- Majestas Leprosus (2003)
- Rattenkönig (2005)
- Sorrow Galaxies (2007)
- Black Metal Cult (2024)
- Pandemonium of Egregores (2025)

=== Demos ===
- Rehearsal 1992 (1992)
- Rites through the Twilight of Hell (1992)
- Ceremony of the Black Cult (1993)
- Evil – The Gestalt of Abomination (1993)
- Cursed (Rehearsal 1994) (1994)
- Satanist Styrken (1994)
- Black Imperial Blood (Travel) (1994)
- Rehearsal 2001 (2001)
- Destroy Your Life for Satan (2001)

=== EPs, splits and compilations ===
- Hail Satanas We Are the Black Legions (1994)
- Promo (1995)
- New False Prophet (2000)
- Split with Deathspell Omega (2002)
- 1992–2002: Ten Years of Depressive Destruction (2003)
- From the Entrails to the Dirt (Part II) (2005)
- Split With Drowning The Light and Satanic Warmaster (2007)
- Black as Lead & Death (EP, 2012)

== See also ==
- Les Légions Noires
- Heavy metal umlaut

== Works cited ==
- Avril, Pierre (27 November 2019). "Beatitudo Falsa Est: Interview avec Meyhnach de Mütiilation". Le Scribe Du Rock (in French and English).
- Drachman, Jillian (2 April 2024). "Album Review: Mütiilation – 'Black Metal Cult'". Metal Insider. LG Media.
- Exspiravit, F. (10 April 2024). "Mütiilation – Black Metal Cult". Black Metal Terror Magazine.
- Göransson, Niklas (18 March 2020). "Noktu (Drakkar Productions, Celestia)". Bardo Methodology.
- FleshOvSatan (1 May 2012). "Mütiilation : Black Millenium (Grimly Reborn)". Thrashocore (in French).
- Jumper, Jolly. "Mütiilation : Sorrow Galaxies". La Horde Noire (in French).
- Rosenthal, Jon (1 November 2017). "The Rebirth of Meyhnach". Invisible Oranges.
