= Atropine (album) =

Studio album by Velvet Cacoon
- Released: August 10, 2009 CD
- Genre: Dark ambient
- Length: 2:02:27
- Label: Full Moon; FMP039
- Producer: Velvet Cacoon

Velvet Cacoon chronology
Northsuite (2005)	Atropine (2009)	P aa Opal Poere Pr. 33 (2009)

Atropine is the third album released by the black metal band Velvet Cacoon. It features a completely dark ambient sound.

== Release history ==
CD Released by Full Moon limited to 1000 copies.

== Track listing ==
All songs written by Velvet Cacoon.

Disc 1

1. "Candlesmoke" - 6:24
2. "Funeral Noir" - 9:35
3. "Graveside Sonnet" - 12:38
4. "Dreaming in a Hemlock Patch" - 36:44

Disc 2

1. "Nightvines" - 3:03
2. "Nocturnal Carriage" - 13:06
3. "Earth and Dark Petals" - 13:02
4. "Autumn Burial Victoria" - 27:55

== Personnel ==
- Velvet Cacoon - All

== Trivia ==
This album entirely samples various other songs, and slows them down and adds minor effects. This album was made to fulfill Velvet Cacoon's contract with Full Moon Productions. Some samples include: Candlesmoke samples Wallow by Faith & Disease, Graveside Sonnet samples Le Corridor from Angel-A, Dreaming In A Hemlock Patch samples Front by B.J. Nilsen, & Earth And Dark Petals samples Andre Running from Angel-A
