= Velvet Cacoon =

American black metal band

- Origin: Portland, Oregon, United States
- Genres: Atmospheric black metal, dark ambient
- Years active: 1996–2009, 2020–present
- Labels: Starlight Temple Society (2009–present); Sunyata Records (2010–present); Full Moon Productions 2004–2009; Ivory Snowfish Music (2005) Southern Lord Recordings
- Members: Josh (SGL); Angela (LVG)

Velvet Cacoon is a black metal hoax band from Portland, Oregon, United States. Josh, the founder of Velvet Cacoon, has described the band as a "total fraud". The band is responsible for promoting a number of hoaxes and plagiarizing songs from other bands.

== History ==
The band is alleged to have been formed in 1996, although no material was released publicly until 2002. Due to the lack of information being provided by its members, it has proved very difficult to discern what is truth and what is fiction about Velvet Cacoon. There are, however, several clear cases where plagiarism has been identified, leading to a measure of disillusionment and distrust by their fans.

Josh is the only confirmed member of Velvet Cacoon. He is alleged to have created a diesel-powered guitar called a "dieselharp" that was "amplified and recorded underwater in various sized aquariums"; this was later admitted to being a hoax. Josh has advocated the use of dissociative drugs such as dextromethorphan.

As of December 2009, Velvet Cacoon have broken up. However, Josh has posted on several forums that he has begun a new project entitled Clair Cassis. Clair Cassis released an album on vinyl LP record via Full Moon Productions in 2010, and two EPs releases through Khrysanthoney Co.

== Discography ==
=== Studio releases ===
- Dextronaut - (2002)
- Music For Falling Buildings - (2002)
- Chapelflames (Red Steeples) - (2003)
- Genevieve - (2004) Full Moon Productions
- Northsuite - (2005) Full Moon Productions
- Dextronaut (Remastered) - (2006) Full Moon Productions
- Atropine - (2009) Full Moon Productions
- P aa opal Poere Pr. 33 - (2009) Starlight Temple Society
