= From the Entrails to the Dirt =

Compilation album by various bands
- Released: 2005
- Genre: Black metal
- Length: 53:53
- Label: End All Life Productions

From the Entrails to the Dirt is a compilation album released by End All Life Productions, featuring songs by French black metal acts Malicious Secrets, Antaeus, Mütiilation and Deathspell Omega.

The album was first released as a triple vinyl set, with each disc featuring a Malicious Secrets track on one side and another band's contribution on the B-side. Deathspell Omega's contribution, "Mass Grave Aesthetics", was re-released in 2008 as a standalone EP.

Professional ratings
Review scores
Source	Rating
Archaic Magazine	(favorable)
Spirit of Metal	(19/20)

== Track listing ==
=== Part I – 7" Vinyl (EAL 038) ===
1. "Part I: Interior Crack Psycho Angel Bitch" – Malicious Secrets
2. "Gates to the Outside" – Antaeus

=== Part II – 10" Vinyl (EAL 039) ===
1. "Part II: Rejection and Raising Perdition Blaze" – Malicious Secrets
2. "My Way" – Mütiilation
3. "Tears of a Melancholic Vampire" – Mütiilation

=== Part III – 12" Vinyl (EAL 040) ===
1. "Part III: Send Me to Hell Day of Wine and Thorns" – Malicious Secrets
2. "Mass Grave Aesthetics" – Deathspell Omega

=== Digipack CD edition (EAL 043) ===
1. "Part I: Interior Crack Psycho Angel Bitch" – Malicious Secrets (6:08)
2. "Part II: Rejection and Raising Perdition Blaze" – Malicious Secrets (6:26)
3. "Part III: Send Me to Hell Day of Wine and Thorns" – Malicious Secrets (7:32)
4. "Gates to the Outside" – Antaeus (3:00)
5. "My Way" – Mütiilation (3:44)
6. "Tears of a Melancholic Vampire" – Mütiilation (7:20)
7. "Mass Grave Aesthetics" – Deathspell Omega (19:43)

== Musical style ==
Filip Dupont of Archaic Magazine described the music of Malicious Secrets as "pure chaos and junk […], divine for some – rubbish for the most". Nattskog of Spirit of Metal Webzine described the style as "very violent, very strange with completely barbarian vocals above music that isn't less [barbarian]". The Antaeus track "Gates to the Outside" follows the chaotic and brutal style typical for the band. Nattskog described Mütiilation's cover of "My Way" as "in the style expected from Mütiilation: ailing, raw, depressive". Mütiilation's "Tears of a Melancholic Vampire" is a melancholic song, while the final track "Mass Grave Aesthetics" was described by Dupont as "dark, full of atmosphere and unique in its style".

== Reviews ==
Filip Dupont of Archaic Magazine called From the Entrails to the Dirt "pure cult in the deepest of the underground", considering Deathspell Omega's "Mass Grave Aesthetics" to be the best track and the one "that makes this 'From The Entrails To The Dirt' such a remarkable release". Nattskog of Spirit of Metal Webzine recommends the release to "adepts of a pure and frankly extreme black metal".

== Notes ==
- Track number 5 ("My Way") is a cover version of the 1967 pop song popularized by Frank Sinatra and later covered by Sid Vicious, among others.
- Track number 4 ("Gates to the Outside") features lyrics provided by Drakh of Katharsis.
