= Rattenkönig =

Studio album by Mütiilation
- Released: January 14th, 2005
- Genre: Black metal
- Length: 47:42
- Label: Ordealis Records (OSCD001)
- Producer: Meyna'ch

Mütiilation chronology
Majestas Leprosus (2003)	Rattenkönig (2005)	Sorrow Galaxies (2007)

Professional ratings
Review scores
Source	Rating
Hyperblast Zine	(9.2/10)

Rattenkönig (German: "rat king") is the fifth full-length album by French black metal band Mütiilation. The title is a Germanic folkloric tale of rats being attached by the ends of their tails.

== Track listing ==
1. "That Night When I Died" (6:45)
2. "Testimony of a Sick Brain" (4:57)
3. "The Bitter Taste of Emotional Void" (7:33)
4. "Black Coma" (4:17)
5. "The Pact (The Eye of the Jackal)" (6:49)
6. "The Ecstatic Spiral to Hell" (4:35)
7. "I, Satan's Carrion" (5:24)
8. "Rattenkönig" (7:22)

== Production ==
- Written, Arranged & Produced By Meyna'ch

== Personnel ==
- Meyna'ch: Vocals, Guitars, Bass, Drum Programming

== Trivia ==
- A digipack CD released by Battlesk'rs Productions and limited to 1000 copies.
- A picture LP was released by End All Life Productions in 2006.
