= Hail Satanas We Are the Black Legions =

EP by Mütiilation
- Released: 1994
- Recorded: 1993 at Black Legions Studio
- Genre: Black metal
- Length: 13:20
- Producer: William Roussel

Mütiilation chronology
Cursed (Rehearsal 1994) (1994)	Hail Satanas We Are the Black Legions (1994)	Vampires of Black Imperial Blood (1995)

Professional ratings
Review scores
Source	Rating
La Horde Noire	7.5/10 link

Hail Satanas We Are the Black Legions is the first studio recording by French black metal band Mütiilation. The recording pays a direct homage to The Black Legions, which Mütiilation had recently joined at the time of the EP's release. It was issued as a 7" vinyl EP (33 1/3-rpm).

== Track listing ==
1. "Desecrate Jesus' Name" (5:31)
2. "Remembrance of my Past Battles and Times" (4:25)
3. "Black Wind of War" (3:24)

== Reissues ==
The EP was re-released by Nightmare Productions in 2006, with full permission of Meyhna'ch.

== Cover art ==
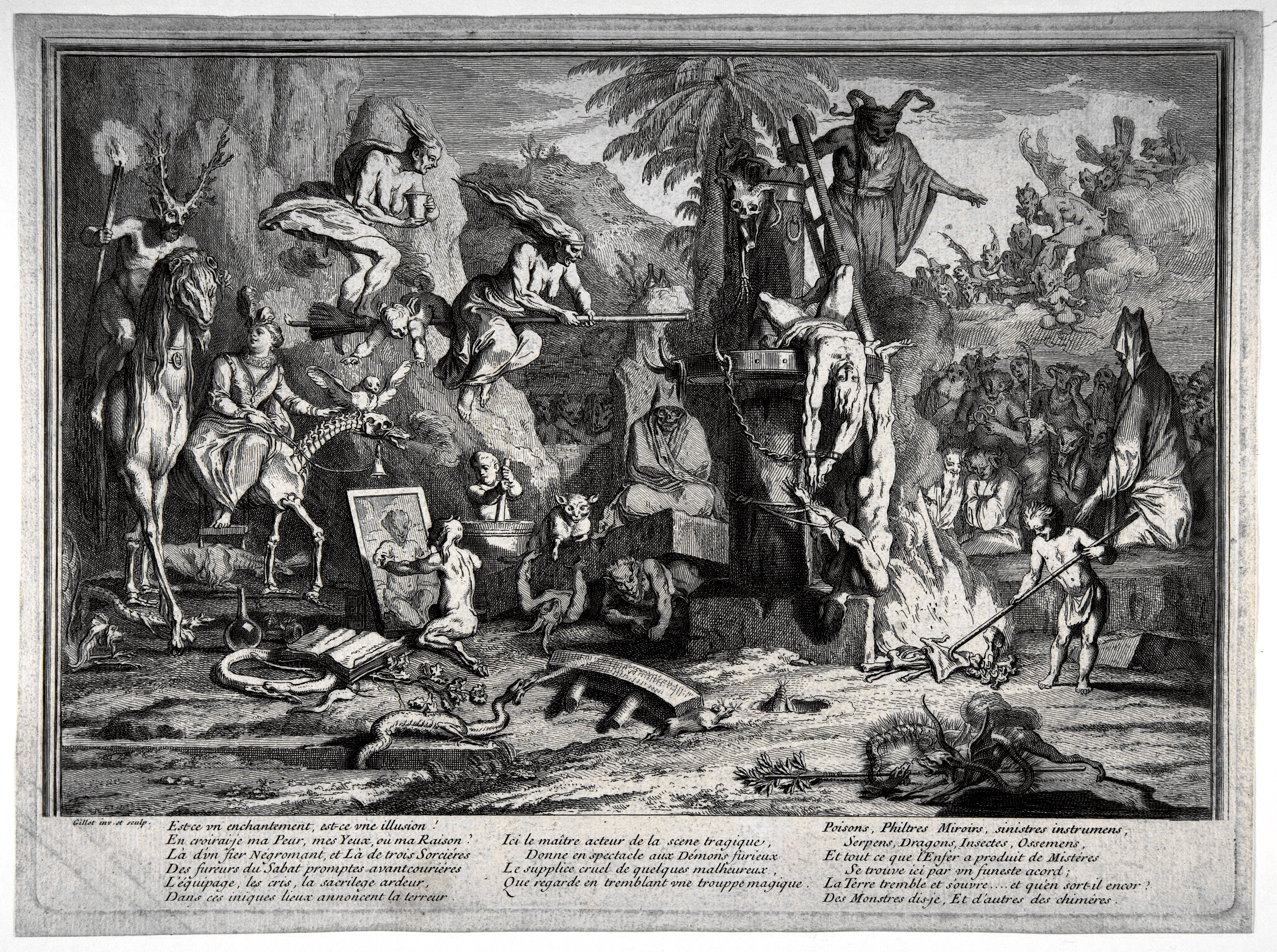
Etching used for the album cover.

The album cover uses an engraving by Claude Gillot (1673 – 1722), depicting several nightmarish creatures.
