= Centurian (band) =

- Origin: Netherlands
- Genre: Death metal
- Years active: 1997-
- Label: Full Moon Productions

Centurian is a Dutch death metal band formed in 1997. Prior to Centurian, drummer Wim van der Valk and guitarist Rob Oorthuis played in a band called Inquisitor. Their sound has been compared to American blackened death metal band Angelcorpse, Hate Eternal and Brazilian death metal band Krisiun. AllMusic deacribed it as "no-frills extreme death metal". They released their early material on Full Moon Productions. They have toured with Krisiun and Swedish black metal band Marduk. Centurian were an influence on the drummer from American death metal band Voodoo Gods, who was given one of the band's albums on CD by a member of Angelcorpse.
