= Arghoslent =

American death metal band

- Also known as: Pogrom (prior to 1990)
- Origin: Oakton, Virginia, U.S.
- Genre: Melodic death metal
- Years active: 1990−present
- Labels: Drakkar Productions, Weltenfeind
- Spinoffs: Grand Belial's Key
- Members: Pogrom; Holocausto; Ulfhedinn; Aktion T4
- Past members: M.S. Gravedigger; Kommando; Von Demonicus; Alienchrist; The Genocider; Einzelganger
- Website: https://weltenfeind.com/arghoslent

Arghoslent (meaning "Slave of the Universe" in Ancient Greek) is an American melodic death metal band from Oakton, Virginia, formed in mid-1990. While acclaimed in the metal underground for their traditional metal-influenced brand of galloping riffs and bluegrass-style guitar leads, the band's white supremacist lyrics have been the source of extensive criticism. Arghoslent's primary lyrical themes include historical racism, apologia for the transatlantic slave trade, medieval warfare, eugenics, imperialism, and European genocide efforts against Native Americans.

Multiple sources, including the Southern Poverty Law Center, The Daily Beast, and Vice magazine have classified Arghoslent as white power music. The band's music was removed from streaming services and online retailers such as iTunes beginning in 2014.

== History ==
The band's name combines the Greek words "argo" (fortress) and "slent" (slave). The band's website has a picture of a slave ship as its primary icon. Arghoslent shares members with Virginia black metal band Grand Belial's Key, which formed in 1992.

The band's lyrics often deal with the transatlantic slave trade. In a 2005 interview, the band said it was interested in the topic because Virginia was "built on the sweaty backs of imported slaves ... the history behind this reality is rooted in the trade of human cargo and imperial servitude. It serves our purpose well to capture these feelings of conquering savage lands. We hope to capture, through our music, the essence of combat, [and] encourage and facilitate violence."

While Arghoslent does not play black metal, the band relates to the National Socialist black metal (NSBM) scene, stating: "We identify with certain points of the so-called NSBM scene, that's obvious. The real question is: do they identify with ours? We pre-date most of this NSBM stuff by a few years."

Arghoslent's second studio album Incorrigible Bigotry takes its album art from the 1830s painting Destruction, part of Thomas Cole's The Course of Empire series. The painting popularly features on white supremacist websites and apparel. The song "Mob of the Howling" is about the sacking of Rome in 410 A.D. by the Visigoths, implying that the superior Germanic race will inevitably vanquish the inferior Mediterranean race. Shortly after the release of Incorrigible Bigotry, then-bassist Kommando lost the tip of one of his fingers and could no longer play bass, he left the band shortly thereafter.

Shortly after the release of the band's third album Hornets of the Pogrom in 2008, guitarist Pogrom said in an interview, "Where I don’t see much contribution of any sort with anything other than brute force and servitude is in sub-Saharan Africa." Regarding the 2008 United States presidential election, Pogrom said, "Shame forced me to vote this year in an attempt to react to the embarrassment of having to be governed by a mulatto." He claimed that multiple metal magazines, including Zero Tolerance, rejected paid advertisements and press coverage opportunities because Arghoslent "is threatening to liberal pinko pseudo-extreme metal queers", with underground metal being led by "synagogue labels".

Arghoslent finished recording and mixing the songs for their fourth studio album, Resuscitation of the Revanchists, published on September 21, 2023. Tracking was delayed due to the travel restrictions caused by the ongoing COVID-19 pandemic, until 2022.

== Members ==
- Pogrom (Alex Halac) – guitars (1990–present)
- Holocausto (Nicholas Mertaugh) – guitars (1993–1997, 2000–present)
- Ulfhedinn – vocals (2007–present), drums (2006–2007)
- Aktion T4 – drums (2007–present)

=== Former members ===
- M. S. (Marc Stauffer) – drums (1990–1996)
- Kommando (Thomas Huff) – bass (1990–2002)
- Gravedigger (Greg Harris) – vocals (1991–1995)
- Von Demonicus (Zachary Kitts) – vocals (1995–2002)
- Alienchrist (Matt Sylvester) – drums (1997–2006)
- The Genocider (Thomas Mortigan) – vocals (2006–2007; died 2024)
- Einzelganger (John Chamot) – bass (2006–2024)

=== Live members ===
- Madman (Spencer Murphy) – guitars (2025–present)
- Anxietous Nero (Daniel Huddleston) – bass (2025–present)

== Discography ==
=== Demos ===
- The Entity cass. (1991)
- Bastard Son of One Thousand Whores cass. (1992)
- The Imperial Clans cass. (1994)
- Arsenal of Glory cass. (1996)

=== Albums ===
- Galloping Through the Battle Ruins CD / LP / cass. (1998)
- Incorrigible Bigotry CD / LP / cass. (2002)
- Hornets of the Pogrom CD / LP / cass. (2008)
- Resuscitation of the Revanchists CD / LP / cass. (2023)

=== EPs ===
- Troops of Unfeigned Might 7-inch EP (2000)

=== Splits ===
- Arghoslent / Stargazer split 7-inch EP (2001)
- Arghoslent / Morbid Upheaval split 7-inch EP (2004)
- Arghoslent / Mudoven / Der Stürmer split 7-inch EP (2005)
- Send Forth the Best Ye Breed split with Martial Barrage CD / LP (2009)

=== Compilations ===
- Arsenal of Glory CD / LP (2000)
- 1990-1994: The First Three Demos CD / LP (2009)
- Unconquered Soldiery CD / LP (2020)
