= Grand Belial's Key =

American black metal band

- Origin: Oakton, Virginia, U.S.
- Genre: Black metal
- Years active: 1992–1993, 1993–2006, 2009–present
- Labels: World Terror Committee, Weltenfeind, End All Life, Drakkar, Wood Nymph
- Spinoff of: Arghoslent
- Members: Gelal Necrosodomy; Ulfhedinn; Unhold
- Past members: Lord Vlad Luciferian; Demonic; The Marauder; The Black Lourde of Crucifixion; Lilith; Der Stürmer; Grimnir Heretik; The Gulag
- Website: https://weltenfeind.com/grand-belials-key

Grand Belial's Key (GBK) is an American black metal band founded in Oakton, Virginia, in 1992 by guitarist Gelal Necrosodomy and vocalist Lord Vlad Luciferian. Lord Vlad Luciferian was later ejected from the group due to internal differences. To date the band has released four full-length albums.

The band is considered to be a part of the National Socialist black metal (NSBM) scene, although the band has rejected this classification.

== History ==
=== Early history (1992–1996) ===
The band started in 1992 with Gelal on guitars, bass guitar and keyboards, and Bestial Luciferian on drums and vocals. By the end of the year, they recorded their debut demo, Goat of a Thousand Young. The next year, they played their first concert with Kommando on bass (from Arghoslent) and Tom Philips (from While Heaven Wept) on keyboards as guests. After the show, Gelal quit the band due to his animosity toward Bestial Luciferian. The band soon split up, but Bestial Luciferian (now Lord Vlad Luciferian) tried to reform GBK, bringing with him Demonic on bass. Tom Philips was set to replace Gelal before Demonic convinced him to rejoin. This lineup then recorded the Triumph of the Hordes demo in 1994.

After the release of the demo, Gelal and Demonic learned that Lord Vlad Luciferian added female voices to one of the songs without asking, and that he had messed up deals with several record companies. Gelal, now even more angry towards Lord Vlad Luciferian, fired him from the band. After this, Demonic quit the band due to lack of time, so Gelal asked The Marauder (guitar player of Arghoslent at the time) to play bass, and recruited The Black Lourde of Crucifixion on drums/vocals (Cazz Grant from Crucifier). This was the lineup which recorded the A Witness to the Regicide EP in 1996.

=== Mocking the Philanthropist (1997–2000) ===
The band's debut album, Mocking the Philanthropist, made Grand Belial's Key one of the most controversial underground black metal acts in the United States. Bassist Der Stürmer (Der Stürmer was the name of a Nazi newspaper published 1923–1945) replaced the Marauder, and the new lineup recorded the LP Mocking the Philanthropist on the Belgian record label Wood-Nymph. The CD booklet contained pictures of the band wearing shirts of far-right bands (Bound for Glory and Spear of Longinus), leading to tour boycotts and other problems. In their first nine years, GBK had only played nine gigs. The album was refused distribution in Germany from the national imprint of Rough Trade Records due to the offensive booklet. Wood-Nymph refused to print a new booklet and, as a result, the label soon folded due to the poor distribution of the album. The CD would later be repressed by Moribund Cult and Drakkar Productions in 2004 and 2006 respectively.

=== Judeobeast Assassination to Kosherat (2001–2005) ===
The follow-up to Mocking the Philanthropist was Judeobeast Assassination, released in 2001. The album's lyrics focused on what the band perceived as the inseparability of so-called Judeo-Christianity, mocking both the New Testament and the Old Testament (Mocking the Philanthropist had focused only on the New Testament). The lyrics were much more provocative and sexually perverse than the ones on Mocking the Philanthropist. The music on the album had a more bass-heavy mix and a thicker sound, unlike Norwegian black metal. The album was almost twenty minutes shorter, in order to fit onto a piece of vinyl.

In 2002, The Black Lourde of Crucifixion left GBK to focus more on Crucifier, and he was not interested in touring Europe. The lineup for the "Pimps of Gennesarret Tour" was Grimnir Wotansvolk on vocals, Gelal Necrosodomy on guitar, Demonic on bass, and The Gulag on drums; the same lineup that would record Kosherat in 2005. Kosherat was released in 2005 on Drakkar Productions, and would be the band's final album before their disbandment. The album's central focus was on Judaism, mocking such rituals as the red heifer and metzitzah b'peh / circumcision. The album also featured four re-recorded tracks from their vinyl EPs, as well as two Chaos 88 covers.

=== Recent history (2006–present) ===
Vocalist Richard P. Mills died in 2006 of drug overdose. Mills, who also went by the names Grimnir Wotansvolk and G. Heretik and was the owner of the National Socialist black metal record label and distributor Vinland Winds. He released Pantheon's Ergriffenheit 10" vinyl record as well as Spear of Longinus and Graveland vinyl records. The label's last release was an exclusive US release of Russian far-right thrash metal band Corrosia Metalla in 2008. The same year, the last GBK recordings were released as a split album with Absurd from Germany and Sigrblot from Sweden; the tracks were recorded during the same session as the Kosherat album and were "exclusively planned for this split". Also in 2006, a GBK concert in Dublin was canceled following protests. They were supposed to play in the Portobello neighborhood, which was the traditional home of Dublin's Jewish community and the location of the Irish Jewish Museum.

The band became active again as of 2009, with Sven "Unhold" Zimper of Absurd on vocals, and Ulfhedinn of Arghoslent on drums. In December 2009, they played Chicago's Hooligan Black Metal show, along with Heathen Hammer, Martial and Absurd. The band also performed at Hammer Open Air Festival at Finland in 2010, and at Hell's Headbash III in September 2016.

In 2017, World Terror Committee, label owned by Unhold, released the demo compilation Goat of a Thousand Young / Triumph of the Hordes, and also reissued the band's EP A Witness to the Regicide in 2019. Gelal Necrosodomy, through his new label Weltenfeind also reissued the band's split of the same name with Absurd and Sigrblot on digipak. The band's fourth album Kohanic Charmers was released on April 15, 2022, exclusively through Weltenfeind on CD. A vinyl version was released in September of the same year. It is the first album to feature Unhold and Ulfhedinn and was originally recorded in 2016 on Germany.

In January 2025, a show in Detroit that Grand Belial's Key was billed on was canceled in the middle of the event because the venue's owners learned about the band's Nazi affiliations along with the local police department receiving several bomb threats.

== Politics and far-right views ==
Grand Belial's Key has been considered to be a part of the National Socialist black metal (NSBM) scene, a label in response to which the band has argued that its lyrics are simply "anti-Jewish/Christian and/or anti-religion"." Upon the release of the band's debut album Mocking the Philanthropist in 1997, Grand Belial's Key faced widespread controversy and boycotts. The band has been criticized for having "used strongly anti-Semitic language in lyrics and titles" and for having "covered songs by openly Nazi punk band Chaos 88." Grand Belial's Key has also displayed modified Nazi flags at their shows.

The band has also released antisemitic merchandise, including a shirt with a Jewish caricature and a back design that reads "Poisoned Rituals of the Levi Tribes" above a menorah.

The Southern Poverty Law Center in 2014 named Grand Belial's Key as a "white power" band. Following the white supremacist Charlottesville terrorist attack, Spotify removed GBK's music from their platform.

== Members ==
=== Current members ===
- Gelal Necrosodomy (Alexander Halac) – guitars (1992–1993, 1993–2006, 2009–present), bass (studio only) (1992–1993, 1995–2000), keyboards (1992, 1994)
- Unhold (Sven Zimper) – vocals (2009–present)
- Ulfhedinn – drums (2009–present)

=== Past members ===
- Lord Vlad Luciferian (Valério Costa) – drums, vocals (1992–1993, 1993–1995)
- Demonic (John Chamot) – bass (1993–1995, 2000–2006, 2009–2024), keyboards (1994)
- The Marauder (Nicholas Mertaugh) – bass (1995–1996), guitar (live) (2002)
- The Black Lourde of Crucifixion (Cameron "Cazz" Sproul Grant III) – drums, vocals (1995–2003; live 2025)
- Lilith – keyboards (1995–1999)
- Der Stürmer (David Cronise) – bass (1998–1999)
- Grimnir Heretik (Richard Mills) – vocals (2003–2006; his death; live 2002)
- The Gulag (Matt Sylvester) – drums (2003–2006; live 2002)

=== Live members ===
- Kommando (Thomas Huff) – bass (1992–1993, 2001)
- The Invocator of Eternal Weeping (Tom Phillips) – keyboards (1992–1993, 1995)
- Anxietous Nero (Daniel Huddleston) – bass (2024–present)

Timeline

== Discography ==
Studio albums

- Mocking the Philanthropist (1997)
- Judeobeast Assassination (2001)
- Kosherat (2005)
- Kohanic Charmers (2022)

EPs

- A Witness to the Regicide (1996)
- The Tricifixion of Swine (2000)
- On a Mule Rides the Swindler (2005)

Demos

- Goat of a Thousand Young (1992)
- Triumph of the Hordes (1994)

Compilations

- Castrate the Redeemer (2001)
- Goat of a Thousand Young / Triumph of the Hordes (2017)

Split releases

- Satan Is Metal's Master / Sperm of the Antichrist (2001) – split with Nunslaughter
- Hobo of Aramaic Tongues / Le Royaume Maudit (2003) – split with Chemin de Haine
- Weltenfeind (2008) – split with Absurd and Sigrblot
