= Canaris (album) =

Studio album by Chris Brokaw
- Released: September 23, 2008
- Recorded: June 2008
- Genre: Alternative rock, post-rock, acoustic rock
- Length: 42:22
- Label: Capitan Records
- Producer: Aaron Mullan; Adam Taylor

Chris Brokaw chronology
Forestry EP (2007)	Canaris (2008)	Gracias, Ghost of the Future (2009)

Canaris is Chris Brokaw's fourth solo album. Released on September 23, 2008 by Capitan Records, Canaris was in June 2008. Largely an acoustic release, the album was recorded by Aaron Mullan at Sonic Youth's Echo Canyon studio in Hoboken, NJ (tracks 1–3), and Adam Taylor at Paul Kolderie and Sean Slade's Camp Street studio (formerly Fort Apache Studios) in Cambridge, MA (tracks 4–6). All its songs are Brokaw's compositions, with the exception of a cover of Drink the Poetry of the Celtic Disciple, written and originally performed by French black metal band Vlad Tepes.

The album was published in a CD-only digipak format and it is notable for being the first release of Capitan Records, an independent label founded by Brokaw.

== Critical reception ==
Professional ratings
Review scores
Source	Rating
Time Out New York	5/5 stars
Prefix Magazine	7/10 stars
Dusted Magazine	Mixed
Blurt	Positive
PopMatters	7/10 stars

The Boston Globe stated that "his new solo album, Canaris, puts the spotlight right where it belongs: on his phenomenal acoustic guitar playing." Similarly, Time Out New York gave the album its highest rating of five stars, asserting that Brokaw's "two main '90s bands, Codeine and Come, specialized in crushing emotional intensity, and since those days his expressive power has only grown"; regarding Canaris' rendition of Vlad Tepes's Drink the Poetry of the Celtic Disciple, the same review stated: "This is Brokaw at his best." In his review of the album for Prefix Magazine, Nick Neyland states that "Canaris fills a satisfying gap that falls somewhere in-between the comatose blackout of Sunn O))) and the genteel psychedelic folk of Keith Wood's Hush Arbors", going on to suggest that "deep in the heart of Canaris is the title track, a heroic slab of treated drone rock that sounds like Brokaw has been inhaled by a colossal black hole and is performing as all the atoms in his body slowly separate." Blurt's review of the album described it as "a brief but wonderful exploration of the acoustic and electric, blues-traditional and experimental byways [Brokaw] and his guitar have traveled." The review declares the album's title track to be "[t]he disc's centerpiece", in which "Brokaw does battle with tone and dissonance and murky dreamlike atmospherics."

Whilst Nate Knaebel, in his review for Dusted Magazine, acknowledges that Canaris "does shine a light on [Brokaw's] undeniable skills", he goes on to states that "[t]racks such as album opener 'Exemptive' and 'Watching the Clouds' aren't going to blow any minds." Overall, Knaebel's response to the album is mixed, although he admits that "[a]nyone familiar with Brokaw's work knows that the guy can play the guitar." In his review of Canaris for PopMatters, Matthew Fiander writes that "Brokaw always excelled as part of bands like Codeine and Come in the past, but here, with no bass or drums to work with his guitar, with his sound left to stand alone, he still sounds like one of the most compelling guitarists in music today."

== Track listing ==
All songs performed solo by Chris Brokaw. All songs written by Brokaw, unless otherwise noted.

No.	Title	Writer(s)	Length
1.	"Exemptive"	Chris Brokaw	3:42
2.	"Drink the Poetry of the Celtic Disciple" (Listed as Drink the Poetry of Celtic Disciple)	Vlad Tepes	12:30
3.	"Watching the Clouds"	Chris Brokaw	5:01
4.	"Sanguinary"	Chris Brokaw	2:49
5.	"Canaris"	Chris Brokaw	17:34
6.	"Exempted"	Chris Brokaw	0:40
Total length:			42:22

== Personnel ==
- Chris Brokaw – acoustic guitars

Additional personnel

- Aaron Mullan – Producer
- Adam Taylor – Producer
