= Blood Libels =

Studio album by Antaeus
- Released: 18 September 2006
- Recorded: June 2006, BST Studios
- Genre: Black metal
- Length: 43:02
- Label: Norma Evangelium Diaboli; The Ajna Offensive (US)
- Producer: Sebastien "BST" Tuvi

Antaeus chronology
De Principii Evangelikum (2002)	Blood Libels (2006)

Professional ratings
Review scores
Source	Rating
Allmusic	3/5 stars

Blood Libels is the third full-length album by French black metal band Antaeus.

== Track listing ==
1. Rot - 5:36
2. Cyklik Torture - 3:40 (Lyrics: Nornagest)
3. Control and Abuse - 5:34
4. Colliding in Ashes - 5:10
5. Words as Weapons - 6:27
6. Here Is Punishment - 3:29
7. Gates to the Outside - 3:27 (Lyrics: Drakh)
8. Blood Libels - 9:39

=== Album notes ===
As noted on the album's Discogs page:

- Track 1 is depicted on the back cover as a symbol resembling the alchemical symbol for putrefaction. In the booklet it is denoted by the same symbol together with the title "Everything Great Is Built Upon Sorrow". The song is otherwise (as likely is the symbol) referred to as "Rot" by the band.
- Track 2 is titled "Cyklic Torture" on back cover, in booklet it appears as entered.
- Track 7 is titled as "The Walking" in booklet.
- Track 8.1 duration refers to entire track 8.
- Track 8.2, the outro of the album at the end of track 8, consists of a cover of "Sono L'Antechristo" by Diamanda Galás, and is cross-faded in from "Blood Libels" from 6:18 on. It is unmentioned in the track listing on the release, but referred to in the credit prints.

== Personnel ==
- Marianne Séjourné - bass
- Oliver - drums
- Servus - guitar
- Bruno Papy - guitar
- Hervé Queyroix - vocals
- Olivier Verron - vocals (outro)
- Arkdaemon - vocals (outro)
- Sébastien Tuvi - vocals (track 8)
