= De Principii Evangelikum =

Studio album by Antaeus
- Released: 23 September 2002
- Recorded: April 2002 at Alpha Omega Studios (Paris)
- Genre: Black metal
- Length: 27:55
- Label: Osmose
- Producer: Raph

Antaeus chronology
Cut Your Flesh and Worship Satan (2000)	De Principii Evangelikum (2002)	Blood Libels (2006)

De Principii Evangelikum is the second full-length studio recording released by French black metal band Antaeus. Counting splits and EPs, it is their ninth recording overall.

== Track listing ==
- All lyrics and music by Antaeus, except where noted.
1. "Intro/Intravenal Call 3:43
2. "De Principii Evangelikum" 2:53
3. "Seen Through Skarz" 2:42
4. "Wormz on Day VI" 2:46
5. "Nave X Kathedral" 2:18
6. "Illegal Angelz" 3:06
7. "Xristik Throne" 3:25
8. "Sanctus" (Lyrics: Arioch) 2:57
9. "Blood War III" 3:32
10. "Untitled" :29
- Note that, although "Untitled" isn't on the CD track list, it is still playable as a separate song on the CD itself.

== Personnel ==
- Sagoth - bass
- Yov - drums
- Bruno Papy - guitar
- Thorgon - guitar
- Hervé Queyroix - vocals

== Production ==
- Arranged by Antaeus
- Produced, recorded, mixed and mastered by Raph
- Recording and mixing at Alpha Omega Studios; Mastering at Germania
- Published by Les Editions Hurlantes.
