= Majestas Leprosus =

Studio album by Mütiilation
- Released: March 2003
- Recorded: Winter 2002–2003
- Genre: Black metal
- Label: Ordealis Records (OSCD001)

Mütiilation chronology
Black Millenium (Grimly Reborn) (2001)	Majestas Leprosus (2003)	Rattenkönig (2005)

Battlesk'rs Productions LP release (SK'R011)

Professional ratings
Review scores
Source	Rating
Hyperblast Zine	(7.9/10) link
Chronicles of Chaos	(7.5/10) link

Majestas Leprosus is the fourth album by French black metal group Mütiilation. The CD version was pressed twice. Only the second version features lyrics inside the booklet.

The album is split into three parts, each containing three songs:

1. "From the Evil Vortex..."
2. "Predominance of Belzebuth"
3. "...To the Suicidal Void"

== Track listing ==
1. "Introducing the Plague" (0:26)
2. "Tormenting my Nights" (8:15)
3. "Destroy your Life for Satan" (5:35)
4. "Bitterness Bloodred" (5:54)
5. "Majestas Leprosus" (3:18)
6. "Beyond the Decay of Time and Flies" (6:36)
7. "The Ugliness Inside" (6:02)
8. "If those Walls could Speak" (7:47)
9. "Words of Evil" (1:18)

== Trivia ==
- The first CD release was only printed in 2000 copies.
- The second CD release was only printed in 1000 copies.
- The LP release by Battlesk'rs Productions in 2005 was only printed in 666 copies.
