= Abigail (band) =

Japanese band

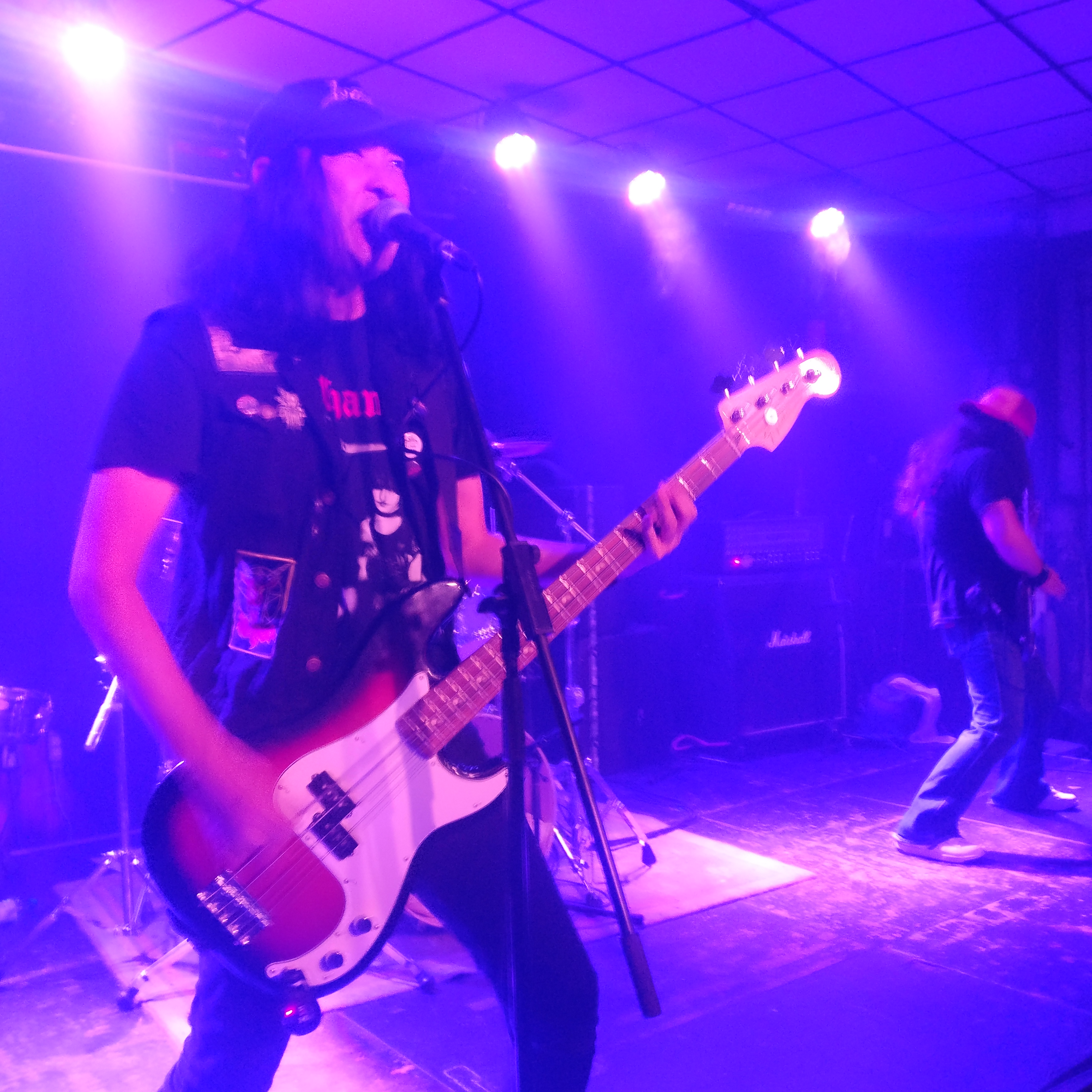
- Abigail performing in Quebec City in 2018.

Background information
- Origin: Tokyo, Japan
- Genres: Black metal, thrash metal
- Years active: 1992–present
- Labels: Nuclear War Now!, Drakkar, From Beyond, Modern Invasion Music
- Members: Yasuyuki Suzuki; Youhei Ono; Jero
- Past members: Yasunori Nagamine; Asuka Matsuzaki

Abigail is a Japanese black metal band from Tokyo formed in 1992. Their first gig was in August 1992, where they served as the opening act for Sigh. At one point in time, Abigail was hailed as "The Most Evil Band in Japan." Their debut album, Intercourse & Lust, was released in 1996. The band has released six full-length studio albums, and numerous more extended plays, splits, and live albums. Bandleader Yasuyuki Suzuki has cited Bulldozer, Carnivore, NME, Sodom, Venom, Bathory, Hellhammer, Celtic Frost, Mercyful Fate, King Diamond, Sarcófago, the early works of Mayhem, Darkthrone, Beherit, VON, Misfits, Terveet Kädet and GG Allin as influences.

American musician Joel Grind, best known for his work with Toxic Holocaust, has performed with the band as a live member. Grind and Yasuyuki Suzuki also have a project together called Tiger Junkies.

== Members ==
=== Current members ===
- Yasuyuki Suzuki- Vocals, guitar, bass (1992–present)
- Youhei Ono- Drums (1992-1993, 1995–present)
- Noboru "Jero" Sakuma- Guitar (2004–present)

=== Past members ===
- Yasunori Nagamine- Guitar (1992-1993, 1995-?)
- Asuka Matsuzaki- Guitar (2002-2003)

=== Current live musicians ===
- Hugo Rikino- Guitar (2023–present)
- Kenjiro Ito- Drums (2018-present)

=== Past live musicians ===
- Satoshi Ishida- Guitar
- Joel Grind- Vocals, Guitar
- TND- Bass (2002)

== Discography ==
This discography contains only their full-length studio albums:

- Intercourse & Lust (1996, Modern Invasion Music)
- Forever Street Metal Bitch (2003, Drakkar Productions)
- Fucking Louder Than Hell (2004, From Beyond Productions)
- Ultimate Unholy Death (2005, Nuclear War Now!)
- Sweet Baby Metal Slut (2010, Nuclear War Now!)
- The Final Damnation (2016, Nuclear War Now!)
