= End All Life Productions =

French record label

End All Life Productions is a French record label that released many black metal albums in the late 1990s and the 2000s.

== Catalogue ==
| Catalogue Number | Band | Release | Year | Format | Ref. |
|---|---|---|---|---|---|
| EAL001 | Antaeus | Rekordin 2000-I | 1999 | MCD | |
| EAL002 | Warloghe | The First Possession | 1999 | LP | |
| EAL003 | Judas Iscariot | Heaven in Flames | 1999 | LP | |
| EAL004 | Mütiilation | Vampires of Black Imperial Blood | 1999 | 2×LP | |
| EAL005 | Hirilorn | Depopulate (Prelude to Apocalypse) | 1999 | 7-inch | |
| EAL006 | Grand Belial's Key | The Tricifixion of Swine | 2000 | 7-inch | |
| EAL007 | Atomizer | The End of Forever | 2000 | LP | |
| EAL008 | Horna/Musta Surma | | 2000 | 7-inch EP | |
| EAL009 | Moonblood | Taste Our German Steel | 2000 | LP | |
| EAL010 | Mütiilation | New False Prophet | 2000 | 7-inch | |
| EAL011 | Primigenium | All Your Tears Will Be Ours | 2000 | 7-inch | |
| EAL012 | Clandestine Blaze | Night of the Unholy Flames | 2000 | LP | |
| EAL013 | Summum Malum | 666 | 2000 | 10-inch | |
| EAL014 | Tsjuder | Kill for Satan | 2000 | LP | |
| EAL015 | Watain | Rabid Death's Curse | 2000 | LP | |
| EAL016 | Sabbat | Sabbatical Magicrypt: French Harmageddon | 2000 | 7-inch | |
| EAL017 | Deathspell Omega/Moonblood | Demonic Vengeance/Sob A Lua Do Bode | 2001 | LP | |
| EAL018 | Various Artist | Black Metal Blitzkrieg | 2001 | LP | |
| EAL019 | Celestia/Goatfire | Darkness Enfold The Sky/Black Slaughterization | 2001 | 7-inch | |
| EAL020 | Eternal Majesty/Temple of Baal | Unholy Chants of Darkness/Faces of the Void | 2001 | LP | |
| EAL021 | Svartsyn | Bloodline/His Majesty | 2001 | 2×LP | |
| EAL022 | Anwyl | Totalitarian Perversity | 2001 | 7-inch | |
| EAL023 | Altar of Perversion | From Dead Temples (Towards the Ast'ral Path) | 2001 | LP+7" | |
| EAL024 | Grand Belial's Key | Judeobeast Assassination | 2001 | LP | |
| EAL025 | Mütiilation/Deathspell Omega | Split | 2001 | 10-inch | |
| EAL026 | Asmodee | Aequilanx | 2001 | 10-inch | |
| EAL027 | Mütiilation | Black Millenium (Grimly Reborn) | 2001 | LP | |
| EAL028 | Atomizer | Death, Mutation, Disease, Annihilation | 2002 | LP | |
| EAL029 | Clandestine Blaze | Fist of the Northern Destroyer | 2002 | LP | |
| EAL030 | Antaeus | Cut Your Flesh and Worship Satan | 2002 | LP | |
| EAL031 | Musta Surma | Kaiken Pyhän Raunioilla | 2002 | 7-inch | |
| EAL032 | Mütiilation | Remains of a Ruined, Dead, Cursed Soul | 2003 | LP | |
| EAL033 | Malign | Divine Facing | 2003 | 10-inch | |
| EAL034 | Mütiilation | 1992-2002: Ten Years of Depressive Destruction | 2003 | 2×LP | |
| EAL035 | Debauchery | Dead Scream Symphony | 2003 | 10-inch | |
| EAL036 | Diapsiquir | Lubie Satanique Depravree | 2003 | 2×LP | |
| EAL037 | S.V.E.S.T. | Urfaust | 2004 | LP | |
| EAL038 | Malicious Secrets/Antaeus | From the Entrails to the Dirt (Part I) | 2005 | 7-inch | |
| EAL039 | Malicious Secrets/Mütiilation | From the Entrails to the Dirt (Part II) | 2005 | 10-inch | |
| EAL040 | Malicious Secrets/Deathspell Omega | From the Entrails to the Dirt (Part III) | 2005 | 12-inch | |
| EAL041 | S.V.E.S.T. | Coaguala - L'Ether du Diable | 2005 | CD | |
| EAL042 | S.V.E.S.T. | Urfaust | 2005 | CD | |
| EAL043 | Malicious Secrets/Mütiilation/Antaeus/Deathspell Omega | From the Entrails to the Dirt | 2005 | CD | |
| EAL044 | Diapsiquir | Virus STN | 2006 | 2XLP | |
| EAL045 | Blacklodge | Solar Kult | 2006 | 2×LP/CD | |
| EAL046 | Heresi | Psalm II: Infusco Ignis | 2006 | LP | |
| EAL047 | Mütiilation | Rattenkönig | 2006 | LP | |
| EAL052 | Abigor | Fractal Possession | 2007 | CD/LP | |
| EAL053 | Mütiilation | Sorrow Galaxies | 2007 | CD | |

== See also ==
- List of record labels
