= Black Millenium (Grimly Reborn) =

Studio album by Mütiilation
- Released: 2001
- Genre: Black metal
- Label: Drakkar Productions (DKCD014)

Mütiilation chronology
New False Prophet (2000)	Black Millenium (Grimly Reborn) (2001)	Rehearsal 2001 (2001)

End All Life Productions re-release

Black Millenium (Grimly Reborn) is the third album by French black metal project Mütiilation. After being away since 1995 (excluding the compilation of unreleased material by Drakkar Productions in 1999), Meyhna'ch thereby resurrected Mütiilation and released this album as a means to reboot the band.

This album was officially rereleased in 2010 by Dark Adversary Productions (Australia).

== Track listings ==
=== Drakkar Pressing ===
1. "The Eggs of Melancholy" (5:20)
2. "New False Prophet" (6:59)
3. "The Hanged Priest" (5:12)
4. "Inferi ira ductus" (3:53)
5. "Curse My Funeral" (5:16)
6. "A Dream" (2:00)
7. "Black Millenium" (5:00)
8. "No Mercy for Humans" (4:19)
9. "Black as Lead and Death" (5:22)

== Trivia ==
- The CD release was only printed in 3000 copies.
- The LP release by End All Life Productions in 2002 was only printed in 400, hand-numbered copies.
