= Vlad Tepes (band) =

French black metal band

- Origin: Brest, France
- Genre: Black metal
- Years active: 1993–1996
- Labels: Drakkar Productions; Embassy Productions; Full Moon Productions; Black Gangrene Productions
- Members: Wlad Drakksteim: Vocals, guitars, drums Vorlok Drakksteim: bass, vocals
- Past members: Nifleim/D.K.: Drums on Reh. Winter '93

Vlad Tepes was a French black metal band which was formed in Brest in 1993. The name originated from the 15th-century Wallachian ruler, the inspiration for Bram Stoker's fictional vampire, Dracula. The group belongs to the Black Legions. Vorlok Drakksteim also has a side project named Black Murder, for which he is the composer, while Wlad Drakksteim is the composer for Vlad Tepes. Vlad Tepes were one of the Black Legions bands featured in the magazine The Black Plague - First Chapter (And Maybe Last One) in 1995.

== History ==
After a self-released rehearsal tape, the demo-tape War Funeral March (1994) was released on the American market by Full Moon Productions. It was followed the next year by March to the Black Holocaust, a split release with fellow Black Legions act Bèlkètre, issued on the French Embassy Productions.

Between May and July 1995, Vlad Tepes recorded Dans Notre Chute..., described as the third official demo. It was followed in November by a demo entitled Black Legions Metal, on which Vlad Tepes played covers of other Black Legions bands. This demo included tracks by Mütiilation, Bèlkètre, and Brenoritvrezorkre.

In 1996, another split album with the Black Legions project Torgeist, Black Legions Metal, was released by the French Drakkar Productions. Vlad Tepes' activity came to an end that same year with the recording of their fourth and final official demo, Morte Lune.

Wlad later stated that Vlad Tepes had planned their work in four chapters from the outset: birth (War Funeral March), rising (Celtic Poetry), decay (Dans Notre Chute...) and death (Morte Lune).

== Influence ==
Among the musicians who cite Vlad Tepes as influence are guitarist Thurston Moore of the alternative rock band Sonic Youth, American bassist Matt Heyner, and guitarist Chris Brokaw.

In 2008, Chris Brokaw recorded an acoustic cover of the song Drink The Poetry of Celtic Disciple, which he considers to be Vlad Tepes' masterpiece, and included it on his album Canaris. Wlad subsequently contacted Brokaw and suggested recording an acoustic cover of Ravens Hike. Both songs were included in the compilation The Drakksteim Sessions, released in 2015.

In 2018, the promise of a private meeting with Wlad Drakksteim enabled the Festival invisible, a music festival in Brest, to bring in musician Thurston Moore, a self-proclaimed fan of Vlad Tepes. This encounter is recounted as a graphic novel by Arnaud Le Gouëfflec and Nicolas Moog in their book Underground. At the 2019 edition of the Festival invisible, a jam session took place between Thurston Moore, Chris Brokaw, and Wlad Drakksteim.

== Discography ==
=== Demos ===
- Rehearsal Winter '93 (Dec. 1993)
- War Funeral March (Demo 1, Aug. 1994, Tape, Full Moon Productions)
- The Return of the Unweeping (Trial demo, also wrongly called The Return of the Unweeping Moon, Sept. 1994)
- Celtic Poetry (Demo 2, Nov. 1994)
- Into Frosty Madness (Trial demo, Jan. 1995)
- Brouillons I (unofficial draft leaked tape, May 1995)
- Brouillons II (unofficial draft leaked tape, May 1995)
- Dans Notre Chute... (Demo 3, Jul. 1995)
- The Return of the Unweeping II (Experimental demo, also called reh '96, Oct. 1995)
- Black Legions Metal (cover demo, often wrongly called The Black Legions, Nov. 1995)
- Morte Lune (Demo 4, Mar. 1996)

=== Splits ===
- March to the Black Holocaust (1995, split-CD with Bèlkètre, 1000 hand-numbered copies, Embassy Productions TE002)
- Black Legions Metal (1996, Split-CD with Torgeist, Drakkar Productions DKCD002)

=== Re-releases ===
- War Funeral March (MCD 1996 official re-release, 500 copies Embassy Production TE003)
- Black Legions Metal (2004, split-LP official re-release, Drakkar Productions DKLP009)
- March to the Black Holocaust (2013, split official re-release CD/vinyle/tape, Drakkar Productions DKCD071, DKLP026, DK078)
- War Funeral March (2013 official re-release CD/vinyle/tape, Drakkar Productions DKCD072, DKLP027, DK079, contains Rehearsal Winter '93 as bonus)
- Anthologie Noire (2013, double-CD, semi-official release Drakkar Productions DKCD075)
- The Return of the Unweeping (2013, semi-official release vinyle/tape, Drakkar Productions DKLP029, DK081)
- Celtic Poetry (2013, semi-official release vinyle/tape, Drakkar Productions DKLP030, DK082)
- Into Frosty Madness (2013, semi-official release vinyle/tape, Drakkar Productions DKLP031, DK083)
- Dans Notre Chute... (2013, semi-official release vinyle/tape, Drakkar Productions DKLP032, DK084)
- Morte Lune (2013, semi-official release CD/vinyle/tape, Drakkar Productions DKCD073, DKLP028, DK080)
- Winter (2014 MCD, official release of Reh' Winter '93, Drakkar Productions DKCD083)
- Celtic Poetry (2014 MCD, official release, Drakkar Productions DKCD084)
- Into Frosty Madness (2014 MCD, official release, Drakkar Productions DKCD085)
- Dans Notre Chute... (2014 CD, official release, Drakkar Productions DKCD089)
- Morte Lune (2014 CD, official release, Drakkar Productions DKCD090)
- The Return of the Unweeping - Collection (2014 CD, official release, contains The Return of the Unweeping I & II demos, Drakkar Productions DKCD091)
- The Drakksteim Sessions (2015 double-CD, contains the Black Legions Metal -the Vlad Tepes part of the split with Torgeist as well as the eponymous cover demo-, several unreleased projects and Vlad Tepes covers by Chris Brokaw, Arkha Sva, Infernal Necromancy & Recluse, Drakkar Productions DKCD094)
- An Ode to Our Ruin (2017 cassette, official release, Black Gangrene Productions
