= Tsjuder =

Norwegian black metal band

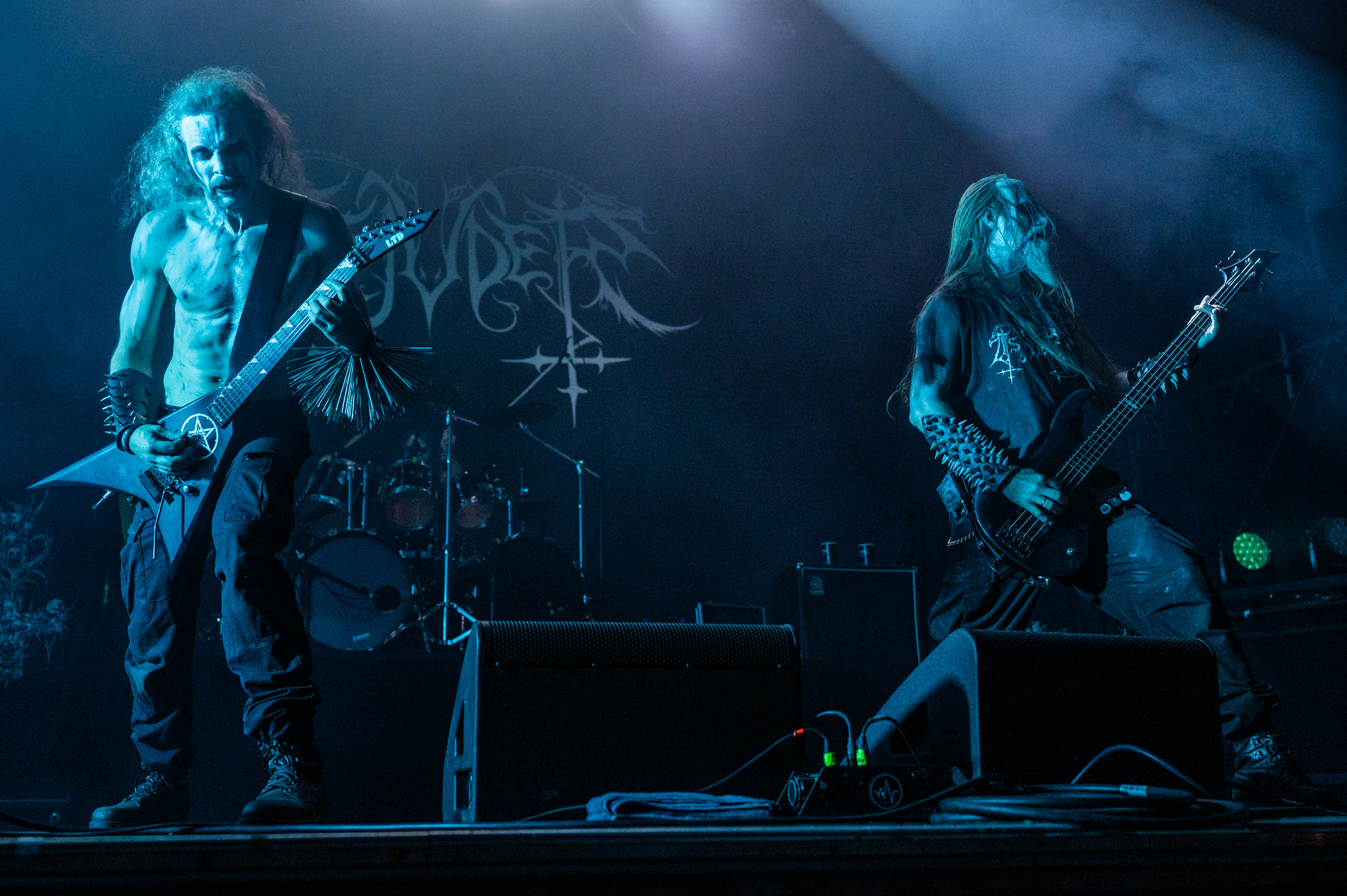
- Tsjuder performing at Midgardsblot 2025

Background information
- Origin: Oslo, Norway
- Genre: Black metal
- Years active: 1993–2006, 2010–present
- Label: Season of Mist
- Website: tsjuder.com

Tsjuder is a Norwegian black metal band founded in Oslo in 1993. For the majority of the band's existence, it has functioned as a trio, including bassist and frontman Nag, guitarist Draugluin, and drummer Anti-Christian. With the latter's departure, the band operates as a duo, with Nag and Draugluin being the longterm and primary members.

== Name ==
The name Tsjuder was picked from the Norwegian movie Pathfinder (Veiviseren). The Tsjuder (or Chud) was a mythical Northern Finnic tribe. In the movie, the Tsjuder were the evil antagonists who appeared out of the harsh, arctic winter night.

== History ==
Originally from Oslo, Tsjuder was formed in 1993 by bassist and vocalist Nag and guitarist Berserk, with second guitarist Draugluin joining in 1994. After a year of rehearsals and writing, the band record their first demo tape, entitled Ved Ferdens Ende—shortly after, Berserk left the band. Tsjuder replaced him with drummer Torvus for their second demo tape, 1996's Possessed. The following year, Tsjuder underwent another change in its formation, with Torvus being fired, and his replacement Desecrator, along with American guitarist Diabolus Mort, recorded the Throne of the Goat EP, released through Solistitium Records in 1997. Later in 1998, both Diabolus Mort and Desecrator left the band due to "lack of interest". The full-length debut album was then planned with Blod from Gehenna on drums, and Arak Draconiiz from Isvind; who joined the band as guitarist. They then, recorded the promo Atum Nocturnem actually meant for Blod to rehearse, but indie labels had begun to pay attention to Tsjuder's "totally uncompromising brand of brutal, speed-addicted black metal" and it was eventually released by At War Records in 1999. Later that year, Tsjuder signed a deal for two albums with Drakkar Productions, and the debut album Kill for Satan was recorded. Because of time limits and that Blod was unable to join the band on the first planned tour in 2000, Christian "Anti-Christian" Svendsen joined instead on the drums.

After the release of Kill for Satan, Arak Draconiiz moved away from Oslo, and was replaced by Pål. In October 2001, Svendsen had to leave the band, because he got tendinitis in both arms. Guitarist Pål also left the band due to his working hours. Svendsen was replaced by Jontho of Ragnarok, and this line-up recorded from December 2001 to January 2002, which became the band's second studio album Demonic Possession, which was released through Drakkar Productions in 2002. Norwegian label Mester Productions also re-released the Throne of the Goat EP on picture disc in a limited edition of 666 copies that same year. In 2003, the recovered Svendsen returned to Tsjuder, replacing the drummer Jontho. The band signed to the French label Season of Mist in April 2004, and, after striking this new deal, their third full-length Desert Northern Hell was released in November 2004. Tsjuder toured Europe with Carpathian Forest in early 2005.

As of 2006 the band had split up, but reunited to play at Wacken Open Air festival in August 2011 and continued to tour afterwards. A fourth studio album, Legion Helvete was released in October 2011 and a fifth, Antiliv, in September 2015. The band's sixth album, Helvegr, was released in June 2023.

== Musical style and lyrical themes ==
The music in Tsjuder is mainly written by Nag and Draugluin, citing as main musical inspirations the black metal bands from the early 1980s and early 1990s such as Bathory, Celtic Frost, Darkthrone, Gorgoroth, Immortal, Marduk, Mayhem, and "old" thrash metal and death metal bands: Destruction, Kreator, Possessed, Sepultura, Slayer, and Sodom.

Tsjuder's lyrics are written prior to the music, and are based on topics such as darkness, death, evil, hatred, demons, antireligious themes, Satanism, horror films, and the fictional book Necronomicon, that appears in the stories of horror novelist H. P. Lovecraft, considered as a "great source of inspiration" by frontman Nag.

== Band members ==
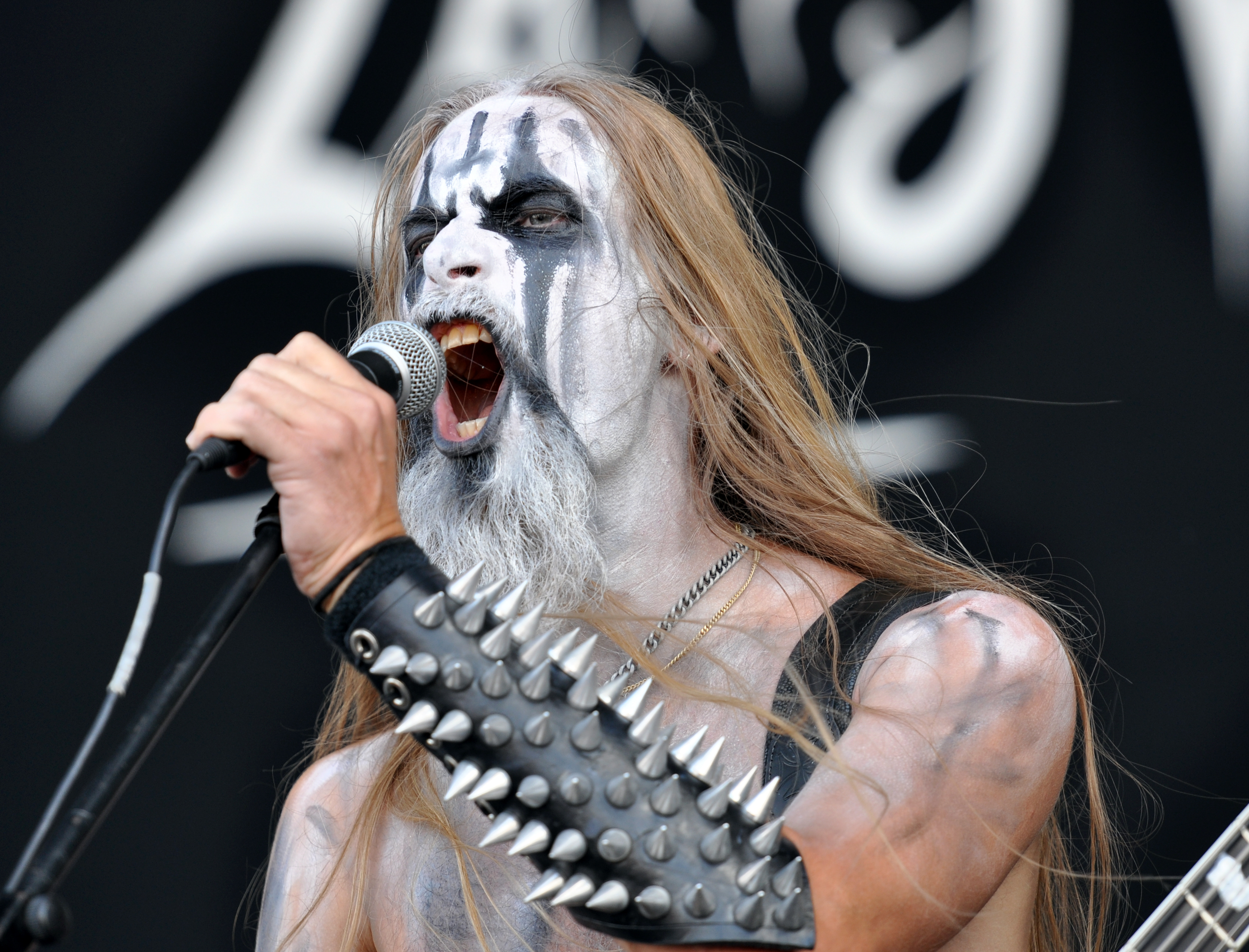
Nag at the 2013 Party.San Metal Open Air

Current

- Nag (Jan-Erik Romøren) – vocals, bass guitar (1993–2006, 2010–present)
- Draugluin (Halvor Storrøsten) – guitar, vocals (1994–2006, 2010–present)
- Emil Wiksten - drums (2024 - present)

Former

- Berserk – guitar (1993–1995)
- Torvus – drums (1995–1996)
- Desecrator – drums (1997–1998)
- Diabolus Mort – guitar (1997–1998)
- Blod – drums (1998–1999, died 2018)
- Arak Draconiiz – guitar (1999–2000)
- Pål – guitar (2000–2001)
- Jontho – drums (2001–2003, died 2025)
- Anti-Christian (Christian Svendsen) – drums (1999–2001, 2003–2006, 2010–2020)
- Jon Rice – drums (2020-2024)

== Discography ==
Studio

- Kill for Satan (2000)
- Demonic Possession (2002)
- Desert Northern Hell (2004)
- Legion Helvete (2011)
- Antiliv (2015)
- Helvegr (2023)

Live

- Norwegian Apocalypse (2006)
