= Les Légions Noires =

Former French avant-garde black metal musical collective

- Origin: France
- Genres: Black metal; dungeon synth; experimental; dark ambient; noise; soundscapes
- Years active: 1993–1997, 2015–present
- Labels: Drakkar; End All Life; Full Moon
- Past members: Lord Aäkon Këëtrëh; Lord Beleth'Rim; Vordb Bathor Ecsed; Vorlok Drakksteim; Wlad Drakksteim; Dark Wizzard of Silence; Krissagrazabeth; Lord Meyhna'ch; Lord Ogvdreb; Lord Urvdrem; Mørdrëd / Belinda

Les Légions Noires (also known as The Black Legions in English, or simply abbreviated to LLN) is a movement of French underground black metal musicians and their bands, centered mostly around the city of Brest, in Brittany. The bands involved limited their releases to very small numbers (often just enough to get to the other circle members), and distributed them among friends and close workers. The collective was primarily active between 1993 and 1997.

== History ==
Possibly the circle was formed in the late 1980s, early 1990s, in response to the supposed Norwegian "Black Metal Inner Circle". According to a 2005 series in Terrorizer magazine on the history of black metal, "A bunch of corpsepainted characters, rumoured to be drawn from such acts as Mütiilation, Torgeist and Vlad Tepes named themselves the 'Black Legions' as a tribute to the so-called 'Black Mafia' Norwegian BM heroes Darkthrone and Burzum, who were supposedly ready to terrorize Christians a couple of years before." The first recordings of LLN members came about in the early 1990s, and their influence was acknowledged in the same issue of Terrorizer: "One should never count out France, primarily as the home of the inscrutably influential Black Legions of ridiculous rawness during the mid-90s."

Regarding their influences, Wlad Drakksteim of Vlad Tepes referred, in an interview with Petrified magazine, to Hellhammer and especially Bathory: "Every True Black Metal Horde should play in old Bathory style." When asked about the "Norwegian Black Metal Mafia", he said, "Norwegian mafia did lots of 'bad' things to this world. With Euronymous' death MAYHEM is definitely dead and it's better like that as it will help Black Metal to return to darkness. [Euronymous] must be in peace now so I don't complain [lament?] him. And about Varg Vikernes (BURZUM) I don't have any opinion. WE have OUR opinions and he certainly knows them so..."

In 1991, Meyhna'ch (real name William Roussel) founded the band Mütiilation in Montpellier. That autumn, Vordb Báthor Ecsed formed the ambient project Moëvöt in Bergerac. In 1992, Vordb and Meyhna'ch discovered each other and began corresponding. In early 1993, Vordb Báthor Ecsed founded the project Bèlkètre. Also that year, Vlad Tepes, a project by Wlad Drakksteim and Vorlok Drakksteim, emerged in Brest.

Meanwhile, black metal was gaining traction in the European metal scene (particularly in France). The murder of Euronymous by Varg Vikernes further fueled the hype around the style. Numerous death metal bands declared themselves black death metal and began fusing the two genres. Vordb at the time believed that this was threatening the very existence of black metal and decided to fight the trend. In summer 1993, Vordb and Meyhna'ch formed an occult musical alliance. The members decided to live in the forest, away from society, and devote their time to music. The movement was named Les Légions Noires.

Vlad Tepes have been outspoken in the goals of their music: "We are Black Legions of Satan, we are the immortal warriors of Black imperial blood. We are here to pervert christian worms and they shall face the Black holocaust. It's near!"

== Discography ==
- Mütiilation: Hail Satanas We Are the Black Legions (1994)
- Vlad Tepes: War Funeral March (1994)
- Vlad Tepes / Belketre: March to the Black Holocaust (1995)
- Mütiilation: Vampires of Black Imperial Blood (1995)
- Vlad Tepes / Torgeist: Black Legions Metal (1996)
- Belketre: Ambre Zuèrkl Vuordhrévarhtre (1996)
- Vlad Tepes: La Morte Lune (1997)

== Bands and projects ==
Personnel:
AäK = Lord Aäkon Këëtrëh
BLT = Lord Beleth'Rim
VRD = Vordb Bathor Ecsed (a.k.a. Vordb Dreagvor Uezeerb)
WOR = Worlok Drakksteim (a.k.a. Vorlok Drakkstein)
WLD = Wlad Drakksteim (a.k.a. Vlad Drakkstein)
NFL = Nifleim
NAI = Naimlambre
KRS = Krissagrazabeth
MYH = Meyhna'ch
ADS = A Dark Soul

Function:
┿ = member
(┿) = former/past member
all = all instruments
dr = drums
vo = vocals
gt = guitar
ba = bass guitar

Project name	AäK	BLT	VRD	WOR	WLD	NFL	NAI	MYH	KRS	ADS	Releases
Aäkon Këëtrëh	┿										3 demos
Amaka Hahina		┿									3 demos, 1 CD
Belathuzur									┿		2 demos
Belkètre	┿		┿								4 demos, 1 CD
Black Murder			┿	┿	┿						2 demos
Brenoritvrezorkre			(vo,gt,dr)	┿		dr					14 demos
Dvnaèbkre				┿	┿						1 demo
Dzlvarv			┿								1 demo
Moëvöt			┿				┿				7 demos
Mütiilation								┿	(dr)		6 CDs, 3 EPs, 6 demos
Satanicum Tenebrae								all			3 demos
Seviss					┿						2 demos
Susvourtre			dr	vo,ba							1 demo
Torgeist	gt	gt,vo	ba							dr	3 demos, 1 CD
Uatrb Vélèpr			┿								1 demo
Vagézaryavtre			gt,vo,ba					vo			1 demo
Vérmyapre Kommando				ba	gt,vo,dr	(dr)					2 demos
Vlad Tepes				ba,vo	vo,gt,dr	(dr)					10 demos, 2 CDs
Vzaeurvbtre			┿		┿						3 demos
