= Full Moon Productions =

- Founded: 1991
- Founder: Jon "Thorns" Jamshid
- Defunct: 2010
- Genre: Black metal, death metal, ambient
- Country of origin: United States
- Official website: http://www.fmp666.com/

Full Moon Productions was a record company started in 1991 by Jon "Thorns" Jamshid from Lakeland, Florida.

== History ==
After releasing the first issue of Petrified 'Zine in August 1993, Thorns decided to sign several black metal bands, which included Burzum, Hades (later known as Hades Almighty), Algaion, Nåstrond, and Vlad Tepes. During this time he worked closely with Count Grishnackh of Burzum and Euronymous of Mayhem. The inaugural release of Full Moon Productions (FMP001), in early 1994, was a cassette tape edition of Burzum's self-titled debut album. Soon after, FMP signed Mysticum, Black Funeral, Abruptum, Swordmaster, and others. Dutch death metal band Centurian also released material on the label.

Petrified 'Zine continued for several issues containing several explicit interviews with Count Grishnackh of Burzum and Bård Faust of Emperor, plus many obscure underground black metal interviews and reviews. The magazine was mentioned in Lords of Chaos as a fanzine "which glorifies the more notorious members of the scene from Norway". However, the authors did not mention Full Moon Productions, and falsified the message of a quote from the fanzine, claiming that Faust, who had stabbed a homosexual man in 1992, "states that homosexuals 'are nice to put knives into'", whereas the original statement goes: "Basically I don't care about them (as long as they keep to their own people), but...what can I say...they are nice to put knives into...". The fourth and last issue was released in winter 1996.

In the late 1990s, Full Moon Productions put out the A Tribute to Hell – Satanic Rites compilation CD. This double included tracks by Mayhem, Acheron, Thy Infernal, Tartaros, Centurian, Swordmaster, Outbreak, Naglfar, Thy Primordial, Sacramentum and others, some of which were exclusive contributions to the CD. The cover was done by Joe Petagno, who is known for the Motörhead artwork.

Full Moon Productions relocated to South Denver (Parker), Colorado in May 2006.

Full Moon Productions officially ceased label and distribution operations in 2012; however, its last official release, the debut release from Portland, Oregon's Clair Cassis, was released in March 2010.
