= Christophe Szpajdel =

Belgian illustrator and calligraphist

- Born: 29 September 1970 (age 55); Gembloux, Namur, Belgium
- Education: Université catholique de Louvain
- Known for: Logotype, calligraphy, illustrations
- Website: www.lordofthelogos.com

Christophe Szpajdel (Polish: [ʃpajdɛl]; born 29 September 1970) is a Belgian-born international calligrapher and illustrator, principally known for designing band logos.

== Life ==
Szpajdel was born on 29 September 1970 in Gembloux, Namur, Belgium, and grew up in Louvain-la-Neuve, Walloon Brabant, Belgium. His parents are of Polish origin but immigrated to Belgium before he was born. He grew up speaking Polish and French, and eventually learned English, German, Dutch, Italian, Portuguese and Spanish. Szpajdel began drawing at the age of 3 when he drew a praying mantis while vacationing with his parents in the south of France.

From 1981 to 1989, he attended the Institut Saint-Jean Baptiste, a Catholic primary school in Wavre, Walloon Brabant, Belgium. His parents were originally against his ambitions of becoming a calligraphist and insisted on his continual education and enrollment in a university. In 1989, Szpajdel enrolled at the Université catholique de Louvain where he studied biology, agronomy and forestry, graduating in 1996 with a degree in Forestry Engineering.

Szpajdel moved from Belgium to England in 2002. Since 2006, he has been residing in Stoke Hill, Exeter, Devon, England, United Kingdom. Although he spends over 30 hours a week drawing, he continues to work a day job as a retail assistant for the Co-op Food convenience store chain around Exeter.

== Career ==
Gallery of logos illustrated by Christophe Szpajdel.

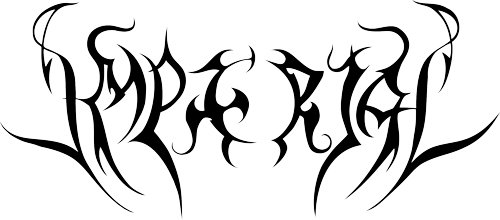
Imperial

Netherbird

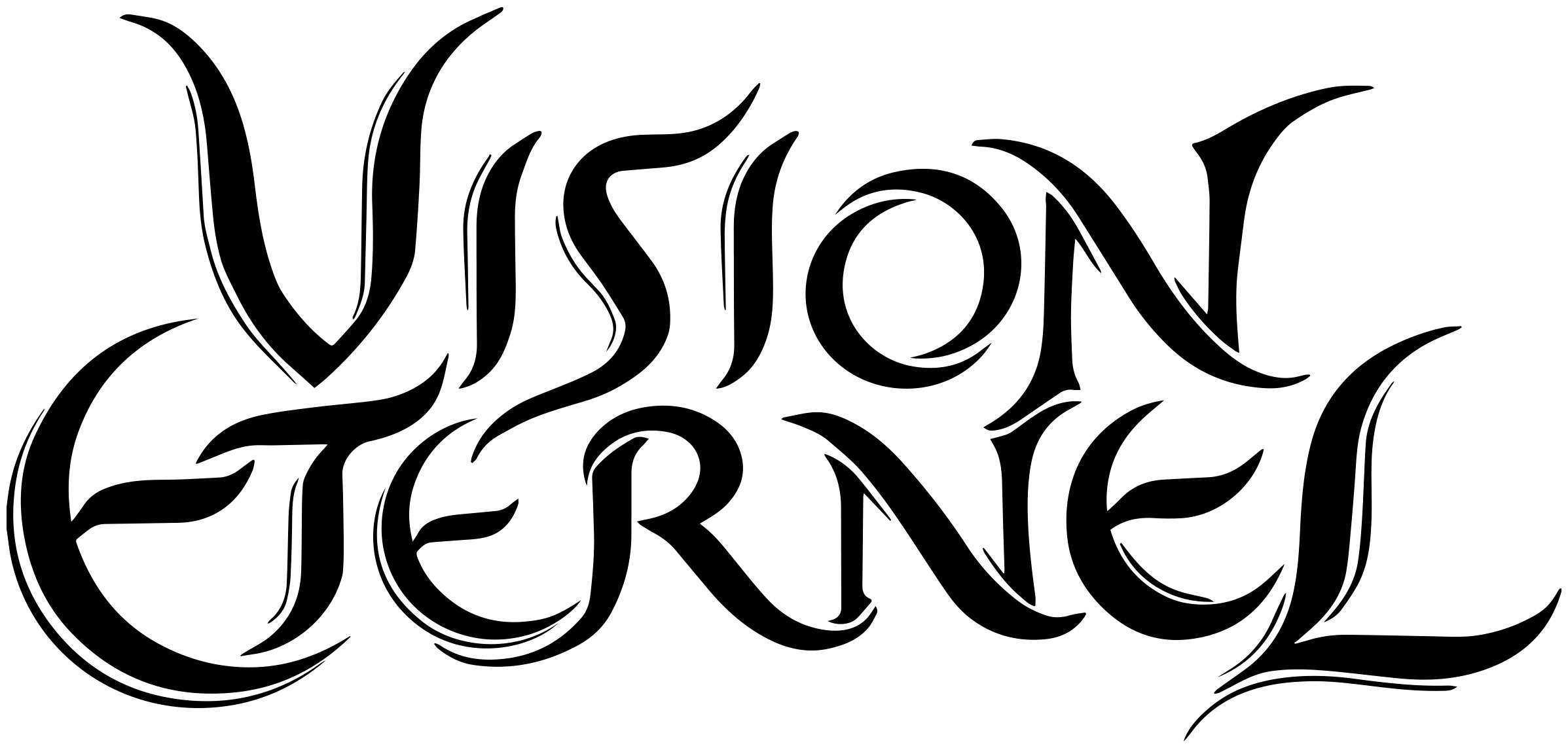
Vision Eternel

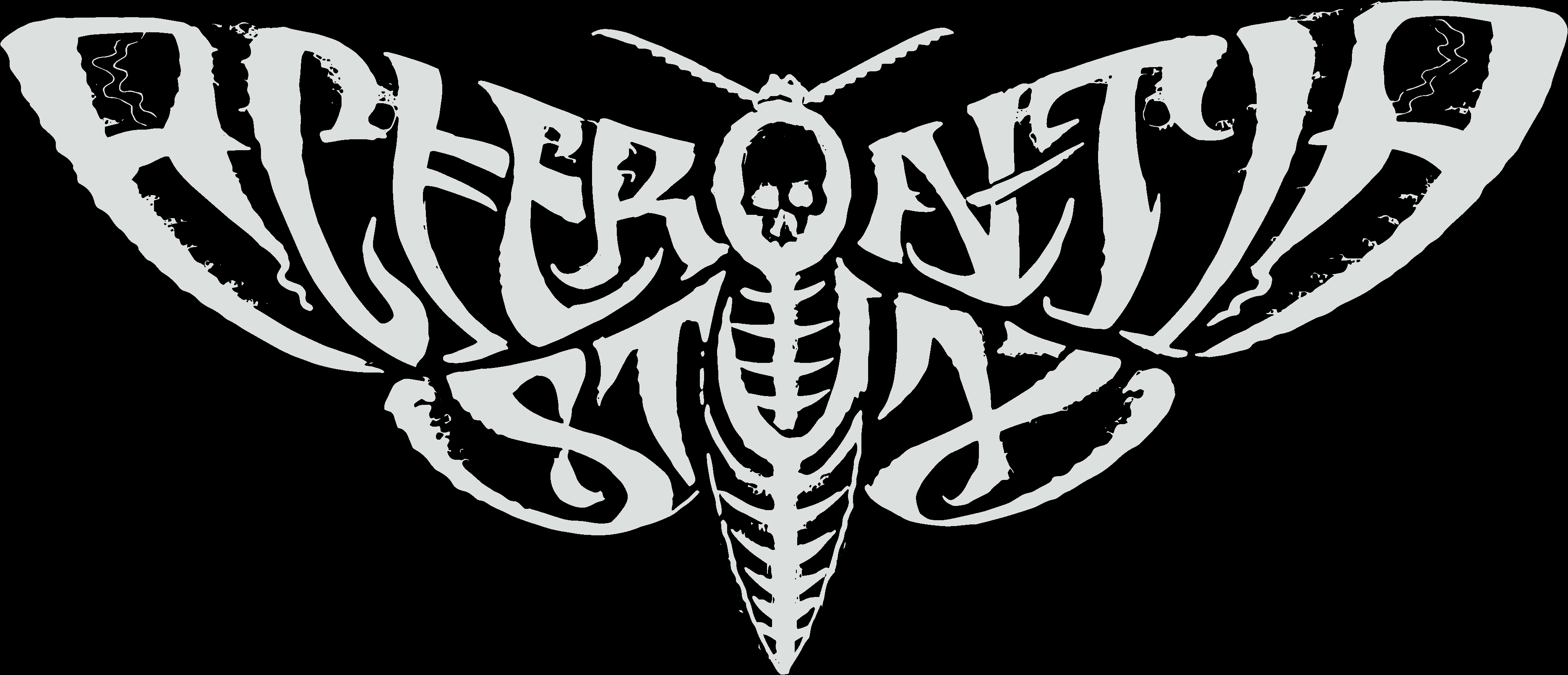
Acherontia Styx

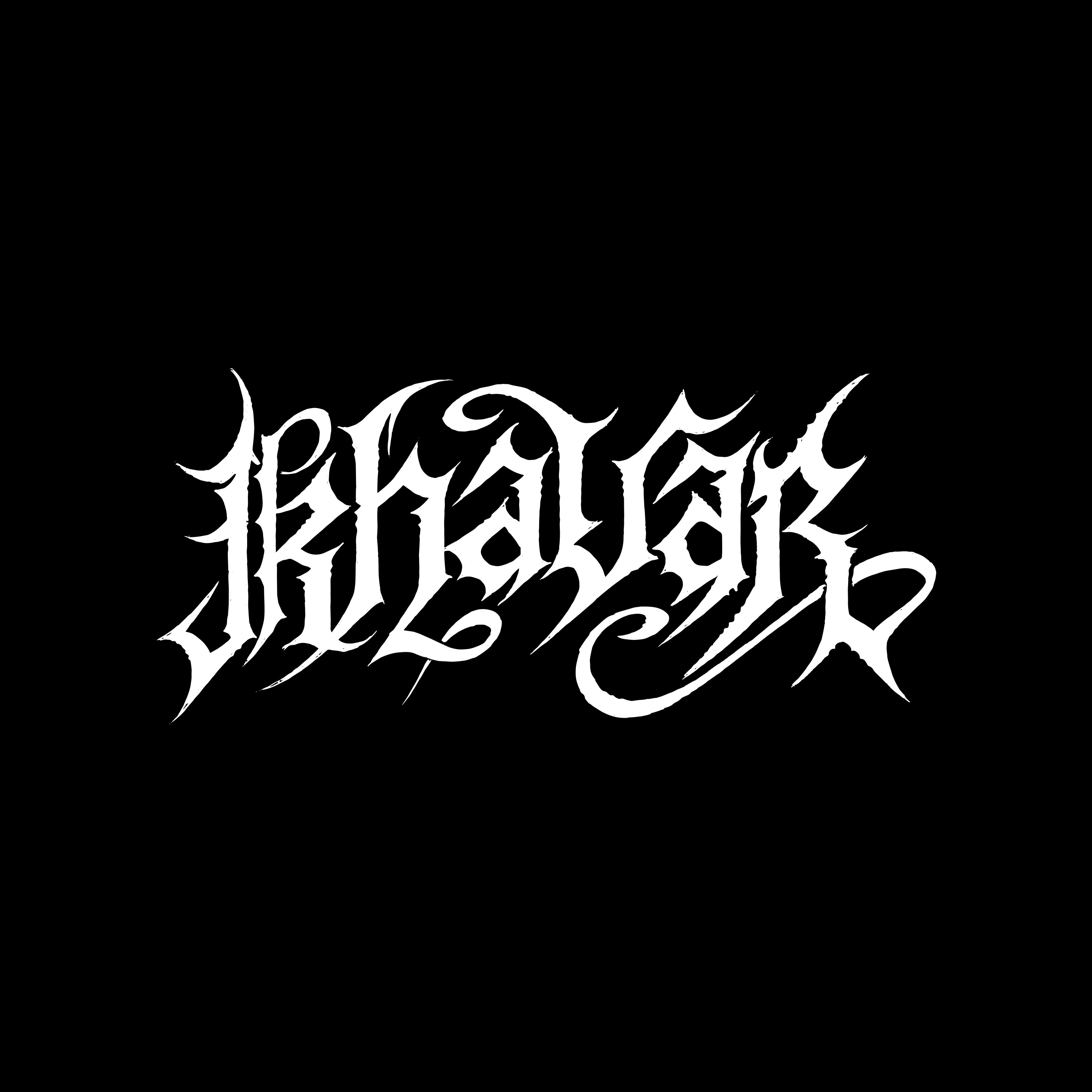
Khavar

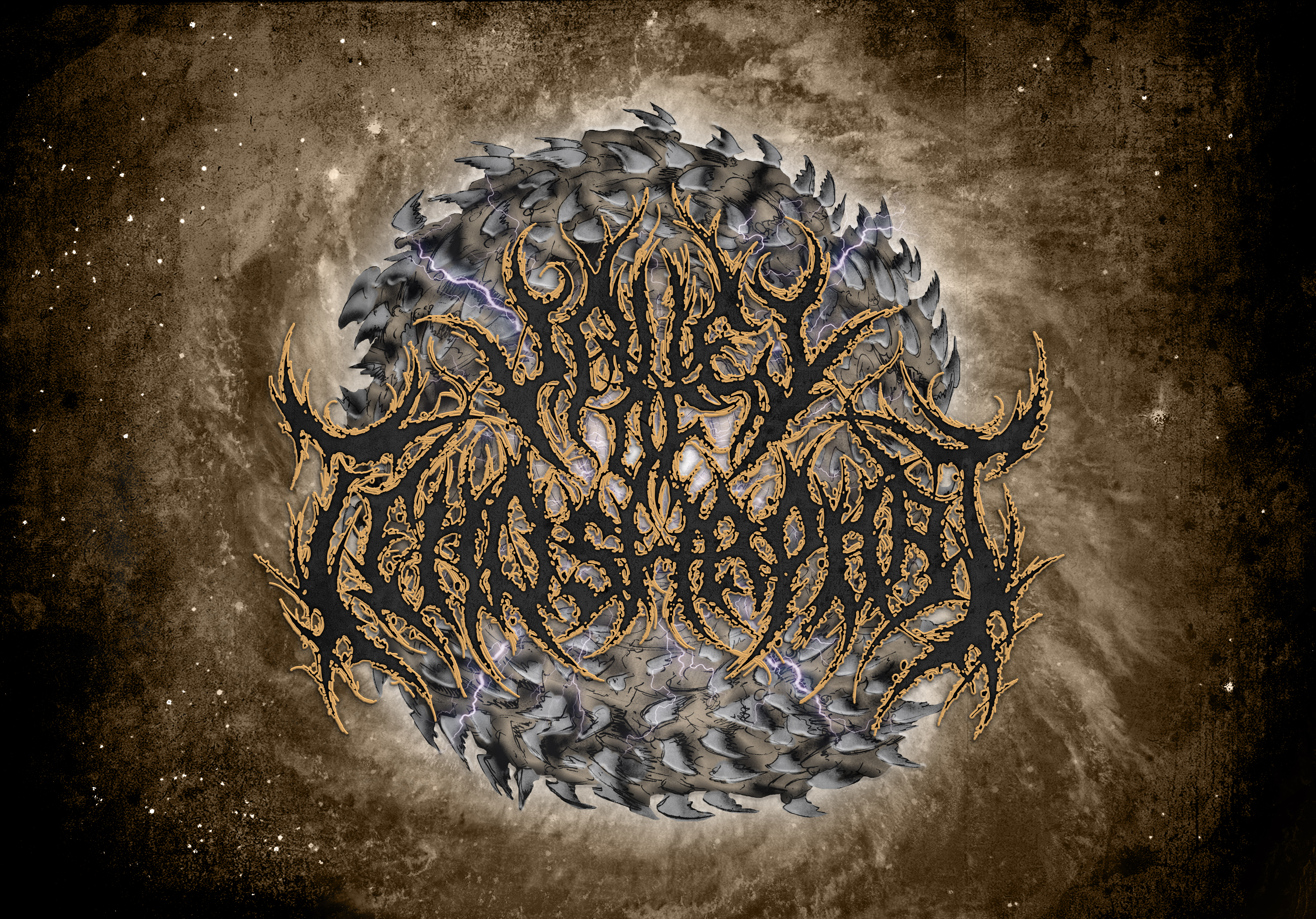
Valley of Jehoshaphat

During his first year at Université catholique de Louvain, Szpajdel joined Thierry Prince's fanzine Septicore, as a writer and illustrator. Some of his early illustrations were featured on the Morbid Noise various artists compilation cassette tapes that came with the fanzines. Septicore released six issues between 1989 and 1991, though two had already been published at the time that Szpajdel joined the team. During his time working at Septicore, Szpajdel was often credited under the pseudonyms Necromaniac, and later Volvox. A seventh issue of Septicore was in development for release in 1992 but was abandoned before completion.

Szpajdel's most prolific logos include ones designed for death metal band Disgrace in 1990, black metal band Emperor in 1992, alternative rock band Foo Fighters in 2015, hip hop artist Rihanna (designed especially for her MTV Video Music Awards appearance and following Anti World Tour) and thrash metal band Metallica, both in 2016. He has also illustrated logos for posters of such films as Mandy and Lords of Chaos (both 2018) and The Tell Tale Heart (2020). Since designing his first professional band logo for Belgian death metal band Morbid Death (featuring members that would later play in Enthroned) in 1988, Szpajdel estimates to have drawn over 10,000 logos, mainly within the black metal, death metal and dark ambient music scenes.

The significant amount of work that Szpajdel has done in the industry has led him to be nicknamed, originally by a fan in 2006, the Lord of the Logos. This sobriquet was reinforced when he authored a book of the same name, Lord of the Logos: Designing the Metal Underground, published in January 2010 through Die Gestalten Verlag. The book showcases a selection of 2500 of his illustrations from over the years, accompanied by photographs taken by Szpajdel. Lord of the Logos: Designing the Metal Underground was successful enough for a sequel, titled Archaic Modernism: The Art of Christophe Szpajdel, publication through Heavy Music Artwork on 16 December 2020. When first announced in the 2010s, the second book's title was tentatively titled Ancient Modernism; once it was picked up for publishing by Heavy Music Artwork, it was given a release date for September 2020 but was pushed back by several months. Szpajdel's illustrations and interviews have also appeared in the books Logos from Hell: A Compendium of Death and Black Metal Logos (2008, re-printed 2015; Doomentia Press), Black Metal: Beyond the Darkness (2012; Black Dog Publishing), Black Metal: Evolution of the Cult (2013, Feral House), Darkadya: The Book of Art From Below Vol. 2 (2016, Darkadya Books) and Arte Arcana (2018; Heavy Music Artwork), and have been featured in such magazine as Metal Maniacs, Metal Hammer, Terrorizer and Vice.

Szpajdel was also the subject of a documentary, appropriately titled Lord of the Logos, which explores his life and work as cult artist and his decades-long career designing logos for the metal underground. The 12-minute documentary was directed by Luke J. Hagan and had its United Kingdom premiere on 2 December 2016 at the Two Short Nights Film Festival. The documentary had its United States premiere in August 2017 at the San Diego Underground Film Festival, and has most recently been shown again in the United Kingdom at the Homegrown Shorts festival, held at the Curzon Cinema & Arts on 27 March 2019. Szpajdel has also appeared and collaborated with such prominent heavy metal documentaries as Until the Light Takes Us, which was released in 2008 and documents the black metal music scene, and SWR Barroselas Metalfest's The 15th Rebellion of the Steel Warriors, released in 2014.

== Style ==
Szpajdel has cited Art Deco, Art Nouveau and modernism as major influences in his drawing style. He coined the term depressiv'moderne to categorize his own style. Artists often mentioned as influential include Henri de Toulouse-Lautrec, Victor Horta, Hector Guimard, Peter Behrens, Gustav Klimt, Timothy Pflueger, Wiliam Van Alen, Bruce Goff, Frank Lloyd Wright, Beryl Cook, Tamara de Lempicka.

== Works ==
This is an incomplete list of logos designed by Szpajdel.

- A Hill to Die Upon
- Abigail Williams
- Absurd
- Abyssal Frost
- Acheron of Sorrow
- Aeternal in Black
- Agnorisis
- Altars
- Anamorph
- The Anchor Aquarium Services
- Ancient Malus
- Anima Damnata
- Animus Mortis
- Apolokia
- Araziel
- Arcturus
- Behexen
- Belle Rouge
- Black Achemoth
- The Black Hand
- Blasphereion
- Blut Aus Nord
- Book of Belial
- Bouq
- Brymir
- Borknagar
- Catharist
- Ceremonium
- Chasma.
- Cirrhosis * Corpus Christii
- Covenant
- Cryostorm
- Cryptic Tales
- Cursed Ruin
- Dark Fortress
- Dark Horizon Productions
- Dark Storm
- Darkside Of Innocence
- Dawn of a Dark Age
- Dawn Of Crucifixion
- Deadwood Lake
- Deathraid
- Deborah Dean
- Desaster
- Dimmu Borgir
- Disciples of the Watch
- Disgrace
- Deviser
- Draconian
- Dragonfly
- Droefheid
- Elysium
- Emperor
- Empyrium
- Enthroned
- Eternity of Darkness
- Ezurate
- Falkenbach
- Fast Company
- Filii Nigrantium Infernalium
- Flagellum Dei
- Fleshgod Apocalypse
- Foo Fighters
- Forever Mourne
- Frog Mallet
- The Golden Age
- Graveland
- The Green Evening Requiem
- Hantaoma
- Heartbleed
- Hell-Militia
- Holocausto Canibal
- Horacle
- Horna
- Idolatry
- Illicit
- Immundus
- Impiety
- In The Wake Of Tragedy
- Introitus
- Ingested
- Ishmael
- Judas Iscariot
- Jpan_arts
- Kult ov Azazel
- Laconist
- Liar Of Golgotha
- Lichway
- Licurgo
- Liquid Angel
- Maid Room
- Malice Divine
- Meat Anchor
- Melechesh
- Metallica
- Minneriket
- Moonspell
- Morbid Death
- Morbid God
- Morgawr
- Mortal Profecia
- Mystifier
- Nachtmystium
- Namter
- Nargaroth
- Necro Ritual
- Necronomidol
- Night Line
- Ninkharsag
- Nocturn Deambulation
- The Obelisk
- The Obliterate Plague
- Old Man's Child
- Plagues Ov Khaos
- Primigenium
- Really Interesting Group
- Rihanna
- Sacramentary Abolishment
- Samsas Traum
- Sceptocrypt
- Seize The Soul
- Seth
- Shoot Me Again
- Slanesh
- Slaughter Messiah
- Soulburn
- Spheres
- Starless Night
- Stone Circle
- Stormcrow
- Thy Light
- Trimonium
- Trivium
- Triumfall
- Truth Be Told
- Troll
- Tsjuder
- TV3 News
- UnderConsideration
- Unleash
- Valdyr
- Vervamon
- Visalis
- Violent Virtues
- Vision Eternel
- Warcrab
- Witchcraft
- Witchmaster
- With Faith Or Flames
- Wolves in the Throne Room
- The Wounded Kings
- Zoltar

== Exhibitions ==
Szpajdel's work has been exhibited around the world. The following list provides an (incomplete) overview.

=== 2007 ===
- 29 September: Autumn Equinox Festival, Dingbatz, Clifton, New Jersey, United States

=== 2009 ===
- Art Deco Society Exhibition, Newport, Oregon, United States

=== 2010 ===
- 29 January: Christophe Szpajdel Mini-Exposition, Exeter Central Library, Exeter, Devon, England
- 25–30 October: Music and Image Festival, Roodkapje, Rotterdam, The Netherlands

=== 2011 ===
- 6–21 September: Devon Open Studios, North Bridge Inn, Exeter, Devon, England
- 11–23 September: Christophe Szpajdel, Magnum Opus Tattoo Gallery, Brighton, England
- November: Little Krimminals, Studio Krimm, Berlin, Germany
- October–February 2012: Graphic Design Now in Production, Walker Arts Center, Minneapolis, Minnesota, United States

=== 2012 ===
- October 2011-February: Graphic Design Now in Production, Walker Arts Center, Minneapolis, Minnesota, United States
- January–March: Black Thorns in the White Cube, Paragraph Gallery, Kansas City, Missouri, United States
- January–March: Western Exhibitions, Chicago, Illinois, United States
- May–September: Graphic Design Now in Production, Cooper-Hewitt National Design Museum, New York City, United States
- August: Wacken Open Air, Wacken, Germany
- September: Graphic Design Now in Production, Hammer Museum, Los Angeles, California, United States

=== 2013 ===
- 18 February – 1 March: Trerise Gallery, The Hoe, Plymouth, England
- 16 March – 1 April: Fish Factory Arts Space, Falmouth, England
- June: Santa Maria Summer Festival, Casa da Cultura. Beja, Alentejo, Portugal
- 28 September: Ancient Modernism, Nature: Art + Design, Auckland, New Zealand
- 1 October: Ancient Modernism, Rogue & Vagabond, Wellington, New Zealand
- 26 October: Aurora Infernalis Festival, Arnhem, The Netherlands
- 31 October – 25 December: Macabre Exhibition, The Old Press, St Austell, Cornwall, England

=== 2014 ===
- 13 February – 15 April: Impromptu, Tobacco House, Exeter, Devon, England
- 22 March – 22 April: Ego Fine Art, Redondo Beach, California, United States
- 11 April - June: Inspired By Black Metal, Ancienne Belgique, Brussels, Belgium
- 19 April: Blacken the Globe Festival, Alice Springs, Australia
- 10 May: Crepusculum Australe Exhibition, Rosemount Hotel, Perth, Australia
- 6 September: Gohelle Festival, Lille, France
- 3–4 October: Vimaranes Metallum Festival, Guimaraes, Portugal
- 3–10 October: Murmures D'Outre Tombe, Nerdiest Showroom, Meltdown Comics, Los Angeles, California, United States
- 18 November – 2 January 2015: Jabberwocky & Extreme Metal Art Exhibition, Exeter Phoenix, Exeter, Devon, England
- 22 November: Metalwarzone Festival, Airliner, Los Angeles, California, United States

=== 2015 ===
- 2015: Marks of Metal, Odense, Denmark
- 2015: Walker's Graphic Design: Now in Production

=== 2016 ===
- 2016: Words and Pictures Exhibition, Torquay's Artizan Gallery, Devon, England

=== 2017 ===
- 17–30 September: A Journey Into The Lost Homelands Exhibition, Kafeneio Eleftheria, Drama, Greece

=== 2018 ===
- February: The Art Of You, Artizan Gallery, Torquay, England

== See also ==
- List of calligraphers
- List of illustrators
