= Krieg (band) =

American black metal band

Background information
- Origin: Philadelphia, Pennsylvania, U.S.
- Genre: Black metal
- Years active: 1994-1997 (as Imperial), 1997-2005, 2007-present
- Label: Candlelight Records
- Members: Neill Jameson; A Poole; D Zdanavage; D Sykes; J Dost

Krieg (German for "War") is an American black metal band from Somers Point, New Jersey, founded by Neill Jameson.

== History ==
The band formed in 1995 as Imperial, renamed Krieg in 1997 to avoid confusion with other bands named Imperial. Krieg released their début album Rise of the Imperial Hordes in 1998, and recorded a second studio album, Sono Lo Scherno, unreleased at the time. Some tracks were used on a split with Kult ov Azazel and the compilation The Black Plague.

In 2001, Krieg played with Godless North and Inquisition on the North American Black Metal Invasion tour through Germany, where they were supported by German band Secrets of the Moon. At Krieg's show at Die Festung in Bitterfeld on December 8, 2001, Imperial dedicated his set to Kanwulf of Nargaroth, who was beaten up by NSBM band Absurd's vocalist Ronald Wolf Möbus for threatening to kill the latter's son (who was about one year old at the time). The show was recorded and released on the live EP Kill Yourself or Someone You Love.

In 2003, Krieg released splits with Antaeus and Satanic Warmaster, who, according to Imperial, "fit into my holy trinity of current black metal bands" together with American band Black Witchery, as well as a split with Goat Semen, Necroplasma and Nazxul, and one with Open Grave. The band released the album The Black House and toured with Demoncy and Abazagorath.

In 2004, Krieg announced final album The Harmony Virus. Imperial explained he would disband Krieg "[b]ecause, for now, I have almost reached the goals I have set out for myself. Perhaps KRIEG could return after I have pursued my next projects to their fullest. We shall see." He announced a split single with Canadian band Lust. In 2005, Blue Miasma was released as Krieg's final album. The album was recorded at Winterblut Studio (Germany), Studio One (USA), and Orchard Studio (USA) in 2005, and released via No Colours Records and Darkland Records.

In 2006 Krieg, with Noctuary as tour mates and backing band, toured the West Coast of the US, with added dates in Mexico. The band split up in 2006, and reformed in 2008 for shows in L.A. and San Francisco. They released a split and were working on a full-length.

In 2014, Krieg was to release its second record on Candlelight Records, titled "Transient".

== Musical style and lyrics ==
The band's frontman, Imperial, was inspired to form Krieg by "[a] need to express the emotions inside me, which were empowering, crippling and consuming. […] For me, it's always been about my vision and my word. The only way to express that in perfection is to do it without any outside interference unless permitted." Imperial is in a "constant struggle for control in my life", including a minor nervous breakdown in 2004 and "a heavy dosage of Valium to control a very violent outburst". Imperial is "heavily influenced by his dementia and nightmares". Beherit, Archgoat, Darkthrone, Forgotten Woods, Demoncy, Judas Iscariot, Lugubrum, Pest, Satanic Warmaster, Black Crucifixion, Hellhammer, Burzum, Profanatica and Havohej "have assisted in forming my music background", whereas influences "in the non traditional sense I am extremely influenced by Lou Reed's 'Berlin' album, The Velvet Underground, The Stooges, Danzig/Samhain, early Laibach, Incantation (only with Craig Pillard), Earth (us), and a lot of fucking doom". Krieg have "never been about the usual Satanic black metal subjects, but rather a despondent vision of morbid nihilism".

According to MusicMight, who called them an "uncompromising underground Black Metal legend", Krieg "deal in the rawest of Black Metal delivered in a style and tempo all of their own". Rock Hard journalist Björn Thorsten Jaschinski called Krieg a productive band and described their early works as chaotic, sloppily played black metal inspired by Profanatica and Havohej. In his introduction to an interview with Lord Imperial, Ryan Harding wrote that American black metal bands are "arguably at our best when following the chaotic standard established by the likes of Beherit and the raw evil of Profanatica, as demonstrated by Demoncy and, of course, Krieg".

Compared to earlier releases, The Black House, "whilst equally aggressive, leaned towards a more groove laden and some might say accessible approach", though "[t]he caustic primitivism of […] early recordings is still very much inherent". The album's lyrics deal with "the dissection of my psyche", rebellion, "descent, anger turned within", "one way to envision how death feels from the perspective of the dying", hopelessness/helplessness, betrayal, sexual depravity and murder without the burden of conscience. The Patrick Bateman EP is "a recording unlike any Krieg recording, with absolutely no regard for musical ideas but rather sheer violence and insanity, closer to ambient done completely with metal instruments. When this is finally released it will shock people and hurt a lot of feelings, but that's always been a positive thing for me." According to Blabbermouth, Blue Miasma "is the longest KRIEG work — with a running time of about one hour — and continues to explore different moods and atmopsheres [sic!] that were begun with 2004's 'The Black House'". The album had been announced by Imperial as "the most depressing, experimental and nastiest Krieg release ever" and is based on nightmares that Imperial has experienced since childhood, "though each year with each new trauma only grew more and more macabre. This album needed to have everything audible in order to give the listener a piece of what I go through constantly. Therapy through music, better living through chemistry."

According to Jaschinski, the chaotic, sloppily played style would still be dominating their later album The Isolationist, though the album included ambient elements and was more experimental.

== Discography ==
Studio albums

- Rise of the Imperial Hordes (1998)
- Destruction Ritual (2002)
- The Black House (2003)
- Sono Lo Scherno (2005)
- Blue Miasma (2006)
- The Isolationist (2010)
- Transient (2014)
- Ruiner (2023)

EPs

- Battlegod (demo, 1996)
- The Church (reissue of Forgotten Secrets demo, 2001)
- Kill Yourself or Someone You Love (live EP, 2002)
- Tormenting Necrometal (cassette, 2002)
- Songs for Resistance (cassette, 2002)
- Patrick Bateman (EP, 2004)

Splits

- None Shall Escape the Wrath (split with Judas Iscariot, Eternal Majesty, and Macabre Omen) (2000)
- To the Coming Age of Intolerance (split with Judas Iscariot) (2001)
- Kult ov Azazel / Krieg (split with Kult ov Azazel) (2002)
- Krieg vs. Antaeus (split with Antaeus) (2003)
- Krieg / Satanic Warmaster (split with Satanic Warmaster) (2003)
- 4 Spears in Gods Ribs (split with Goat Semen, Necroplasma, and Nazxul) (2003)
- Resistance Is Futile (split with Open Grave) (2003)
- Death Glorification (split with Morte Incandescente) (2004)
- Satan Shitting on Cunt / Flesh Descending (split with Nunslaughter) (2004)
- Krieg / Azaghal (split with Azaghal) (2004)
- Daze West (split with Nachtmystium) (2005)
- Bleeding for Him / The Church (split with Bael) (2006)
- Krieg / Caïna (split with Caïna) (2009)
- Krieg / Gravecode Nebula (split with Gravecode Nebula) (2011)
- Krieg / Leviathan (split with Leviathan) (2015)

Compilation

- "Slit Their Throats to the Spine" on The Cold, The Silent (1999)
- The Black Plague (2001)

== Members ==
Current members

- Neill Jameson – vocals
- A Poole – guitar
- B Durrant – bass
- J Dost – drums

Former Members
Vocals

- Lord Soth
- MMK (Sarcophagus)
- Satanic Tyrant Werewolf (Satanic Warmaster)
- Azentrius (Nachtmystium)
- Aazaron
- L'hiver (Winterblut)
- Stavros G.

Bass

- Lord Soth
- SM Daemon
- D.O.A.
- Azentrius (Nachtmystium)
- Wrest (Leviathan, Lurker of Chalice, Twilight, Von Goat, Nachtmystium)
- Steven Nelson (Winterthrall, Noctuary)
- Asmodaios (Sterbend)
- God Vomit (Helcaraxe)
- Xaphan (Kult ov Azazel)

Guitar

- Azag (Todesbonden)
- Lord Soth
- Wrath (Averse Sefira)
- D.O.A.
- Phaedrus
- Azentrius (Nachtmystium)
- Malefitor (Nyktalgia)
- L'hiver (Winterblut)
- Satanic Tyrant Werewolf (Satanic Warmaster)
- HC
- Joseph Van Fossen (Noctuary)
- Akhenaten (Judas Iscariot)

Drums

- H.C.
- J Tarby
- Bestial Deathhammer
- Duane Timlin
- Teloc Coraxo (Perverseraph)
- Butcher (Maniac Butcher)
- Wargoat Obscurum (Cult of Daath)
- Thron
- MK (Katharsis)
- Winterheart
- Tomas (Forever Plagued Records, Bloodstorm)
- Chris Grigg
- Sebastian Engelhardt (Voodooshock)
- Flakpanzer 38 (Open Grave)
- Rob Alaniz (Noctuary)
- Thrawn (Secrets of the Moon)
- Cryptic Winter (Funeral Rites)

Lyrics

- Ted "Archæon" Tringo (Autumn Tears)

Songwriting

- Phaedrus

Keyboards

- Ted "Archæon" Tringo (Autumn Tears)
- Lord Soth
- Azag
- Sanford Parker

Viola

- Phaedrus
