= The Celtic Winter =

EP by Graveland
- Released: 1994
- Genre: Black metal
- Length: 37:12
- Label: Melissa Productions

Graveland chronology
In the Glare of Burning Churches (1993)	The Celtic Winter (1994)	Carpathian Wolves (1994)

The Celtic Winter is the first EP by the black metal band Graveland. It originally was planned as an EP for Hammer of Damnation Records, but this release failed due to financial reasons. So it was released as the 6th demo tape in 1994 on Melissa Productions. It was re-released on MCD format in 1994 with only three songs, and then re-released again on CD format in 1996 by No Colours Records. It was rereleased several times by different labels. It was indexed by the German Federal Department for Media Harmful to Young Persons in September 2008, so it appears under the name Evarg - TCW at the No Colours Catalogue.

== Track listing ==
1. Intro - 3:16
2. Call of the Black Forest - 4:22
3. Hordes of Empire - 4:38
4. The Night of Fullmoon - 5:32
5. The Gates to the Kingdom of Darkness - 6:42
6. The Return of Funeral Winds - 8:25
7. Outro - 3:17

== Style ==
The songs are written in middle tempo. Darken's vocals contain a lot of reverb. He used atmospheric keyboards and slow guitars, which had some similarity to Celtic Frost's To Mega Therion.

== Reception ==
Akhenaten of Judas Iscariot called The Celtic Winter together with Det som engang var of Burzum and Transilvanian Hunger of Darkthrone as one of three albums, which were important for his idea of Black Metal. Balor of Morrigan called it a "great release".
