= Primal Exhale =

Studio album by Excalion
- Released: June 17, 2005 Europe; June 15, 2005 Japan
- Genre: Power metal
- Label: Sound Riot Records, Art Union Group
- Producer: Arttu Sarvanne & Excalion

Excalion chronology
Primal Exhale (2005)	Waterlines (2007)

Primal Exhale is the first full-length album by the Finnish Power metal band Excalion.

== Track listing ==
1. "Temptation Wasteland" – 4:58
2. "A Moment in the Spotlight" – 4:13
3. "Reality Bends" – 6:32
4. "Dire Waters" – 5:13
5. "Stage of Lies" – 5:36
6. "Heart and Home" – 4:17
7. "Megalomania" – 5:53
8. "My Legacy" – 5:58
9. "Obsession to Prosper" – 7:56
10. "Luopio" – European bonustrack
11. "Lady Moon" (Demo) – Japanese bonustrack

== Credits ==
- Vocals: Jarmo Pääkkönen
  Guitar: Kimmo Hänninen
  Guitar: Tero Vaaja
  Bass: Timo Sahlberg
  Keyboards: Jarmo Myllyvirta
  Drums: Henri Pirkkalainen
