= Waterline (disambiguation) =

The waterline is where the hull of a ship meets the surface of the water. The load waterline is a special marking indicating the legal load limit of a ship, and, in naval architectural plans, it is any line drawn to delineate hull shape that is in a plane parallel to the surface of the water.

Waterline or water line may also refer to:

== Common meanings ==
- water supply line in a Water supply network, a system of pipes for supplying potable water to buildings across the landscape
- water level line or water level, the level at the water's surface of a variable level of a body of water
  - flood stage
  - high water mark
  - high tide line
  - water table level

== Music ==
- Waterlines (album), a 2007 Excalion album
- "Waterline" (song), a 2012 Jedward song
- "Waterline", a 1984 song from The Icicle Works (album)
- "Waterline", a 1990 song by Lloyd Cole from Lloyd Cole (album)

== Other uses ==
- 1:700 scale Waterline series of scale model ships
- Waterline (Austin), a skyscraper under construction in Austin, Texas, USA
- Water Line (South Korea), a water brand of Nestlé in South Korea, see List of Nestlé brands#Water

== See also ==
- Water level (disambiguation)
