= Wigrid =

German black metal band

- Origin: Saarbrücken, Germany
- Genres: Black metal
- Years active: 1998–present
- Labels: Bleeding Heart Nihilist Prod.
- Members: Ulfhednir

Wigrid is an underground black metal project that was founded by Ulfhednir in 1998. The name is taken from the field Vígríðr, where the battle of Ragnarok will be fought according to the Norse mythos.

== History ==
=== Early years (1998–2004) ===
Wigrid was founded in 1998 by Ulfhednir, as a one-man project in Saarbrücken, Germany. After the band was created, the first demo, "Die Totgeburt Jesu Christi", was released. This demo contained five songs and was never officially published. In the early months of 1999, the second Wigrid demo, "Ort Der Einsamkeit", was recorded. About a year later, the demo "Hoffnungstod" was completed. It was then officially released on CD and LP in 2002.

=== Recent Years (2005-present) ===
In 2005 Wigrid released its second full-length album titled "Die Asche eines Lebens", before going on a lengthy hiatus during which Ulfhednir was active in a variety of other bands and projects. He did not make his comeback until July 2014, when Wigrid released a split CD album on Bleeding Heart Nihilist Productions together with the band Sunshine & Lollipops from Berlin, Germany. It contains two new and previously unreleased tracks by Wigrid.

== Musical style and lyrical themes ==
Ulfhednir has claimed to be influenced mostly by the solo-project Burzum. He also has stated that his early demos were loosely influenced by Darkthrone and some Graveland albums. However, these influences pertain solely to the musical side of Wigrid. The lyrics are written in German and largely concerned with subjects like misanthropy, despair, nihilism, depression and other psychological considerations on an introspective, personal level.

== Discography ==
- Die Totgeburt Jesu Christi (1998), Self-released – Demo
- Ort der Einsamkeit (1999), Self-released – Demo
- Hoffnungstod (2000), Self-released – Demo
- Hoffnungstod (2002), No Colours Records
- Die Asche eines Lebens (2005), No Colours Records
- Split the Indifference (Geteilte Gleichgültigkeit) (2014), Bleeding Heart Nihilist Productions – Split with Sunshine & Lollipops
- Entfremdungsmoment (2019), Bleeding Heart Nihilist Productions
