= Creed of Iron / Prawo Stali =

Studio album by Graveland
- Released: 2000
- Recorded: Summer, 2000
- Genres: Black metal; Viking metal
- Length: 44:24
- Label: No Colours Records

Graveland chronology
Raiders of Revenge (2000)	Creed of Iron / Prawo Stali (2000)	Raise Your Sword! (2001)

Professional ratings
Review scores
Source	Rating
Chronicles of Chaos	7/10

Creed of Iron is the fifth full-length studio album by Polish black metal band Graveland. It was also released under the Polish title Prawo Stali, with lyrics sung in Polish. The album was released in 2000 on No Colours Records (English edition) and in 2001 by Nawia Productions (Polish edition). Both versions was remixed in summer 2009 in Darken Home Forge and released in November 2 on 2 CD with bonus tracks from Raise Your Sword! EP, limited to 500 hand-numbered copies and digipack A5 (Creed of Iron only), 200 hand-numbered copies.

== Track listing of English version 2000 ==
1. "Blood and Ash" - 2:34
2. "Tyrants of Cruelty" - 10:19
3. "No Mercy in My Heart" - 9:29
4. "Ancient Blood" - 11:19
5. "White Beasts of Wotan" - 10:44

== Track listing of Polish version 2001 ==
1. "Krew i Popiół" - 2:32
2. "Tyrani Okrucieństwa" - 10:20
3. "Nie Ma Miłosierdzia w Moim Sercu" - 9:29
4. "Starożytna Krew" - 11:24
5. "Białe Bestie Swaroga" - 10:45

== Track listing of remixed version 2009 ==
CD 1 - Creed of Iron

1. "Blood and Ash" - 2:38
2. "Tyrants of Cruelty" - 10:27
3. "No Mercy in My Heart" - 9:46
4. "Ancient Blood" - 11:27
5. "White Beasts of Wotan" - 10:50
6. "Till the Final Death (Bonus)" - 9:58
7. "Temple of My Hatred (Bonus)" - 10:18

CD 2 - Prawo Stali

1. "Krew i Popiół" - 2:38
2. "Tyrani Okrucieństwa" - 10:27
3. "Nie Ma Miłosierdzia w Moim Sercu" - 9:46
4. "Starożytna Krew" - 11:27
5. "Białe Bestie Swaroga" - 10:50
6. "Ostateczna Śmierć" (bonus) - 9:58
7. "Świątynia Mojej Nienawiści" (bonus) - 10:18
