= Cruel World of Dreams and Fears =

Studio album by Draugveil
- Released: 13 June 2025
- Genre: Black metal
- Length: 30:55

Cruel World of Dreams and Fears is the debut album from Ukrainian-born Czech black metal artist Draugveil, released independently on 13 June 2025. The album became notable among metal fans due to its cover, featuring Draugveil in a suit of armour and corpse paint, and lying in a field of red roses. The cover was the subject of parodying internet memes, as well as accusations of using artificial intelligence (AI) to make it. These claims were later expanded to suggest that AI was used to make the album's music.

== Controversies concerning generative AI usage ==
Upon the album being released on YouTube on the channel Black Metal Promotion, the album attracted attention due to its cover, depicting Draugveil lying in a field of roses, adorned in a suit of armour, wearing corpse paint and having a sword stuck in the ground. Some compared it to covers where other artists are lying on the ground, such as Michael Jackson's Thriller, Luther Vandross's Give Me the Reason, and the UK cover of Lionel Richie's You Are.

Critics of the album, however, suggested that a generative AI tool was used to create the artwork. This was partly due to suggestions that the rose stems in the picture come out from the ground in an unrealistic way. This later resulted in claims from some fans that AI was also used to produce the music, and later the lyrics and vocals. These claims began on a Facebook page entitled "AI Generated Nonsense", which was later deleted. No definitive evidence, however, was produced to back these claims. Derek McArthur, a journalist for Glasgow-based newspaper The Herald, wrote: "The music is in line with what one would expect from a one-man black metal project in the vein of Judas Iscariot and Burzum, but then if AI was asked to create music in a black metal style, that is probably what it would decide to generically produce and spit out." Draugveil's reaction to the claims was: "Let people decide."

The result of the claims of AI has led to some writers to claim that artists in the future will have to prove they are human to be taken seriously, and that members of the public will be increasing doubt as to whether creative works are produced by either humans or AI.

== Track listing ==
Cruel World of Dreams and Fears track listing
No.	Title	Length
1.	"Knight Without a Name"	3:39
2.	"Moonlit Resurrection"	3:12
3.	"Griefmarch"	2:26
4.	"My Sword Points to the Past"	1:03
5.	"Wolves Feast on Forgotten Dream"	3:05
6.	"Etched Oath"	3:03
7.	"Soiltear (with Selvnatt)"	4:05
8.	"Beneath the Armor I Rot"	2:53
9.	"Vortex"	4:18
10.	"When Silence Became My Kingdom"	3:08
Total length:		30:55
