= Forgotten Woods =

Norwegian black metal band

- Genre: Black metal
- Years active: 1991–present
- Labels: No Colours; ATMF
- Members: Rune Vedaa; Nylon

Forgotten Woods is a Norwegian black metal band formed in 1991.

== History ==
Forgotten Woods was founded in 1991. Following the 1993 demos Forgotten Woods and Through the Woods, as well as the Promo 94, the band released their debut album in 1994, As the Wolves Gather, on the German label No Colours Records. Their second album, The Curse of Mankind, was also released on No Colours in 1996. In the meantime, the EP Sjel av natten and their Promo 95 were released independently. That same year, Rune Vedaa and Olav Berland founded the side project Joyless, which was intended to be more experimental than Forgotten Woods and not exclusively based on black metal; the first two Joyless albums and their split EP with Apokryphus were also released on No Colours.

The last Forgotten Woods release on the label was the 2003 3-CD compilation Baklengs mot stupet, which included both albums and the EP, as well as bonus tracks. In 2007, the label rejected the release of their new album, Race of Cain, because the song "Third Eye (New Creature)" contained several Sieg Heil chants. Vedaa wrote to Decibel Magazine that he had personally and in detail explained the lyrics to the label owner and offered several solutions. He stated that the owner's lack of understanding of the artistic perspective and his childish behavior left the band no choice but to leave the label. Furthermore, he found the owner's decision odd given the release of records by far-right groups like Graveland and Nokturnal Mortum. Label owner Steffen Zopf does not give interviews and therefore did not comment on the incident.

The band has since remained relatively inactive, though they have not officially disbanded. In 2017, they re-released The Curse of Mankind in a limited CD digipack via ATMF Records.

== Members ==
=== Current ===
- Rune Vedaa – bass (1991–present), guitar (2006)
- Nylon – guitar, bass (2006–present)

=== Past ===
- Olav Berland – drums, guitar (1991–2022), bass (2006)(died 2022)
- Jarle Swahn – vocals (1991–1993), drums (1994)
- Thomas Torkelsen – vocals (1993–1996, 2007)
- Roger Staveland – drums (1996)
- Rune Jamne – vocals, harmonica (1996)
- Reinhardt Toresen – vocals (1996)
- Neige – vocals (2007)

== Discography ==
- Forgotten Woods (Demo, 1993)
- Through the Woods (Demo, 1993)
- Promo 94 (Demo, 1994)
- As the Wolves Gather (1994)
- Sjel av natten (EP, 1995)
- Promo 95 (Demo, 1995)
- The Curse of Mankind (1996)
- Baklengs mot stupet (3-CD-Box, 2003)
- Race of Cain (2007)
- Forgotten Woods / Through the Woods (Wiederveröffentlichung der ersten Demos, 2007)
