= Iscariot (disambiguation) =

Iscariot most commonly refers to Judas Iscariot, one of the Twelve Apostles best known for betraying Jesus.

Iscariot may also refer to:

- Iscariot (Hellsing), a fictional organization in the manga series Hellsing
- Iskariot, a 2008 Swedish thriller film directed by Miko Lazic

== See also ==
- Judas Iscariot (band), an American black metal band
- Pisces Iscariot, a 1994 compilation album by the Smashing Pumpkins
