= Blue Miasma =

Studio album by Krieg
- Released: 2006
- Genre: Black metal
- Length: 60:59
- Label: No Colours

Krieg chronology
Sono Lo Scherno (2005)	Blue Miasma (2006)	The Isolationist (2010)

Blue Miasma is the fifth studio album by black metal band Krieg. Krieg temporarily split up after the release of this album but reunited in 2007. Darkland Records released a vinyl version limited to 888 copies; the first 300 copies were blue.

== Track listing ==
No.	Title	Length
1.	"The Great Beast Trembled in Nightmare"	3:56
2.	"Who Shall Stand Against Me?"	3:59
3.	"The Blue Mist"	4:04
4.	"Under an Uncaring Moon"	7:13
5.	"The Sick Winds Stir the Cold Dawn"	4:32
6.	"And Now the End"	2:55
7.	"Lingering Doubt"	4:32
8.	"Hallucinations in Deep Corruption"	6:25
9.	"Every Wound Burned"	4:18
10.	"An Empty Room, a Forgotten Funeral"	4:34
11.	"The Master's Voice"	2:14
12.	"Scars Brought into Question"	4:22
13.	"The Forest Beneath the Sea"	7:55

== Personnel ==
- Imperial
- Marcus Kolar
- Azentrius (Session)
- Satanic Tyrant Werewolf (Vocals)
