= Tristwood =

Austrian extreme metal band

- Also known as: December
- Origin: Innsbruck, Tyrol, Austria
- Genres: Industrial metal, death metal, black metal
- Years active: 1996–present
- Label: Sound Riot Records
- Members: Neru; Axumis; Yak; Deimon; Jegger

Tristwood is an Austrian industrial death/black metal band from Innsbruck.

== History ==
The band was formed in 1996 by bassist Deimon and guitarist Neru as December. An early black metal MCD demo, Torment, recorded in January 1997, sold well. Aafter recording, they disbanded until 2001, when Neru and Jegger reformed the band as Tristwood. Deimon returned to the band, and in 2003, they began recording the MCD Fragments of the Mechanical Unbecoming. It used additional programming and synthesizers, causing the band to be categorised as industrial.

In December 2003, the band worked on their first full-length album, Amygdala. After the release, a follow-up album was made, Fragments…, which added a DVD and was classified as a limited box set. That year, vocalist Axumis was recruited. After the two releases, the band in 2005 re-produced previous MCDs on the EP compilation Svarta Daudi, recorded in 10 hours. The Delphic Doctrine was recorded in September. Some of their recordings were sent to Sound Riot Records, who offered the band a contract. The Delphic Doctrine, released in March 2006, received more attention than their other releases thanks to Sound Riot Records pushing for Tristwood to tour more. In May 2006, the band hired bassist Yak. In 2008, they started to record their next record, Dystopia et Disturbia, released in 2010.

After nine years, they released the album Nyx in 2019, followed up by Blackcrowned Majesty in 2020.

== Current members ==
- N – rhythm guitar, synths, programming
- A – lead vocals, throat choirs
- Y – bass guitar
- D – keyboards, additional synths, sampling
- J – lead and rhythm guitars, vocals, throat choirs
- HMG – drums

== Discography ==
Albums

- Amygdala (2004)
- The Delphic Doctrine (2006)
- Dystopia et Disturbia (2010)
- Nyx (2019)
- Blackcrowned Majesty (2020)

Other releases

- Torment (1997, MCD – recorded as "December")
- Fragments of the Mechanical Unbecoming (2003, MCD)
- Svarta Daudi (2005, MCD)
- By the Call of Seth (2006, single)
