= Water level (disambiguation) =

water level may refer to:

- water level (surface), the level of the free surface of a body of water, the water depth
  - flood stage
  - high water mark
  - high tide line
  - water table level, the level of subsurface water
- Water level (device), a liquid filled device that provides an equal height level at each end, allowing finding equal height at two distant points
- Waterline, the water level on the hull of a boat
- Water Level Route, a railroad line in the United States
- Waterlevel Highway, a highway in Tennessee; see APD-40

== See also ==
- Waterline (disambiguation)
- Level (disambiguation)
