= Svartsyn =

Swedish black metal band

- Also known as: Chalice (from 1991–1993)
- Origin: Nynäshamn, Sweden
- Genre: Black metal
- Years active: 1991–present
- Labels: Sound Riot Records; Folter Records; Carnal Records; Agonia Records
- Members: Ornias
- Past members: Draugen; Kolgrim; Worth; Surth; Tormentor

Svartsyn is a black metal band from Sweden formed in 1991 by multi instrumentalist, singer, and lyricist Ornias.

== History ==
The band formed in 1991 as Chalice, but changed their name to Svartsyn in 1993 after original drummer Tormentor's death. They recorded their first demo in 1994, and their first album in 1998. Draugen, ex-drummer of Dark Funeral, joined founding member Ornias in 1996 and left the band in 2010.

In 1996, Svartsyn signed to Folter Records and released their debut album, The True Legend. In May of the following year, they toured the Netherlands and Germany with Behemoth and Desaster. After this tour, Kolgrim (of Unpure) replaced Surth. In June 1997, Svartsyn released the Tormentor 7” EP. In September 1997 and October 1998, Svartsyn recorded their second album, Bloodline at Sunlight Studios, which End All Life Productions released as a limited D-LP. In February 2000, Svartsyn recorded their third album, …His Majesty, at Voisin Studios. They signed to Sound Riot Records to release it.

In 2003, Svartsyn signed with Sound Riot Records for the release of their fourth album, Destruction of Man, and for the re-print of Bloodline, including the Tormentor 7” EP as bonus. Destruction of Man was released in the summer 2003 and Bloodline in September 2005. Carnal Records released their fifth album, Timeless Reign, in September 2007.

After Draguen left in 2010, Ornias continued recording albums and EPs. After signing with Agonia Records, the band released their sixth album, Wrath upon the Earth, in January 2011, with brothers Zoran and Baruch van Bellegem from Belgian band "Satyrus" as session musicians on bass and drums, and keyboards and samples, respectively. The following year, they re-recorded, remixed, remastered, and re-released The True Legend with new artwork by Chadwick St. John and a different track listing.

The band's eighth studio album, Black Sacrament, was released in May 2013, and featured session drummer Ignace "Hammerman" Verstrate. Ornias worked again with Hammerman to release Svartsyn's ninth studio album, In Death, in June 2017.

== Members ==
=== Current ===
- Ornias – vocals, guitars, bass (1991 – present)

=== Former ===
- Draugen – drums (1996–2010)
- Kolgrim – bass (1996–2004)
- Whorth – bass (2001)
- Surth – drums (1994–1996)
- Tormentor – drums, vocals (1991–1993; died 1993)

=== Live ===
- Henke Svegsjö – guitars (1997–1998)

== Discography ==
=== Studio albums ===
- The True Legend (1998)
- ...His Majesty (2000)
- Destruction of Man (2003)
- Bloodline (2005)
- Timeless Reign (2007)
- Wrath Upon The Earth (2011)
- The True Legend Re-recording (2012)
- Black Testament (2013)
- In Death (2017)
- Requiem (2020)
- Vortex of the Destroyer (2025)

=== EPs ===
- Tormentor (1998) [Black Militia]
- Genesis of Deaths Illuminating Mysteries (2012) [Inferna Profundus Records]
- Nightmarish Sleep (2014) [Carnal Records]

=== LPs ===
- Bloodline/His Majesty (2000) [End All Life Productions]
- A Night Created by the Shadows... and the Resuscitation of Unspoken Rituals (2019) [Nomad Snakepit Productions]

=== Split EPs ===
- Kaos Svarta Mar/ Skinning the Lambs with Arckanum (2004) [Carnal Records / Blut & Eisen Productions]

=== Demos ===
- Rehearsal '94 (1994)
- A Night Created by the Shadows (1995)
- Rehearsal '97 (1997)
- Skinning the Lambs (2003)
