= Kill Yourself or Someone You Love =

EP by Krieg
- Released: 2002
- Recorded: 2001, Bitterfeld, Germany
- Genre: Black metal
- Length: 24:54
- Label: Breath of Night

Krieg chronology
| Destruction Ritual (2002) | Kill Yourself or Someone You Love (2002) | The Black House (2003) |

Kill Yourself or Someone You Love is the second EP by black metal band Krieg.

== Track listing ==
| No. | Title | Length |
|---|---|---|
| 1. | "Coldwind Flame" | 4:59 |
| 2. | "Blackash Snowfall" | 3:39 |
| 3. | "Great Black Death" | 3:26 |
| 4. | "Deviant" | 3:38 |
| 5. | "Destruction Ritual" | 4:40 |
| 6. | "End of Time" | 2:31 |
| 7. | "Satanic Blood" (Von cover) | 2:01 |

== Personnel ==
- Imperial – vocals
- Wrath – guitar
- SM Daemon – bass
- Butcher – drums
