= Eternal Majesty =

French black metal band

Eternal Majesty is a French black metal band, formed in Paris in 1995.

It was formed by four brothers under the original name of Enchantress Moon.

== Discography ==
=== Albums ===
- 2002 - From War to Darkness (CD)
- 2006 - Wounds of Hatred and Slavery (CD)
- 2020 - Black Metal Excommunication (CD) (Cassette Tape) (Vinyl)

=== Other Releases ===
- 1997 - Dark Empire (Demo tape)
- 1998 - Split demo with Antaeus
- 2000 - Evil Consecration (Live tape)
- 2000 - None Shall Escape the Wrath (Split CD with Krieg, Judas Iscariot, and Macabre Omen)
- 2001 - Unholy Chants of darkness (Split LP with Temple of Baal)
- 2001 - SPK Kommando (Split EP with Deviant, Antaeus and Hell Militia)
- 2005 - Night Evilness (Mcd) label Diahableries
- 2006 - Wounds of Hatred and Slavery (Album Candlelight/appease me...)

== Band members ==
- Navint (Deviant) - Vocals - (1995 - )
- Sagoth (Madonagun, Antaeus, Autolyse-Dark Electro) - Bass - (1995 - )
- Thorgon (Madonagun, Antaeus, Deviant, Autolyse-Dark Electro) - Drums - (1995 - )
- Martyr (Atrox) - Guitars - (1995 - )
