= Patrick Bateman (EP) =

EP by Krieg
- Released: 2004
- Recorded: 2003, Winterblut Studio
- Genre: Black metal
- Length: 14:50
- Label: HCB

Krieg chronology
| The Black House (2003) | Patrick Bateman (2004) | Sono Lo Scherno (2005) |

Patrick Bateman is the third EP by black metal band Krieg. The title comes from the starring character of the novel American Psycho. The album was recorded at Winterblut Studio, Germany, in 2003. The EP was later reissued in 2010 with a bonus track named "VI".

== Track listing ==
| No. | Title | Length |
|---|---|---|
| 1. | "I" |
| 2. | "II" |
| 3. | "III" |
| 4. | "IV" |
| 5. | "V" |

Reissue

| No. | Title | Length |
|---|---|---|
| 6. | "VI" |

== Personnel ==
- Imperial – vocals
- Phaedrus – guitar
- SM Daemon – bass
- MK – drums

== Reception ==
Reviews for the album were generally positive, praising the vocals delivered by singer Imperial and the blend of black metal and noise used for the songs, but noting that the album might not appeal to the vast majority of black metal fans.
