= Excalion =

Finnish metal band

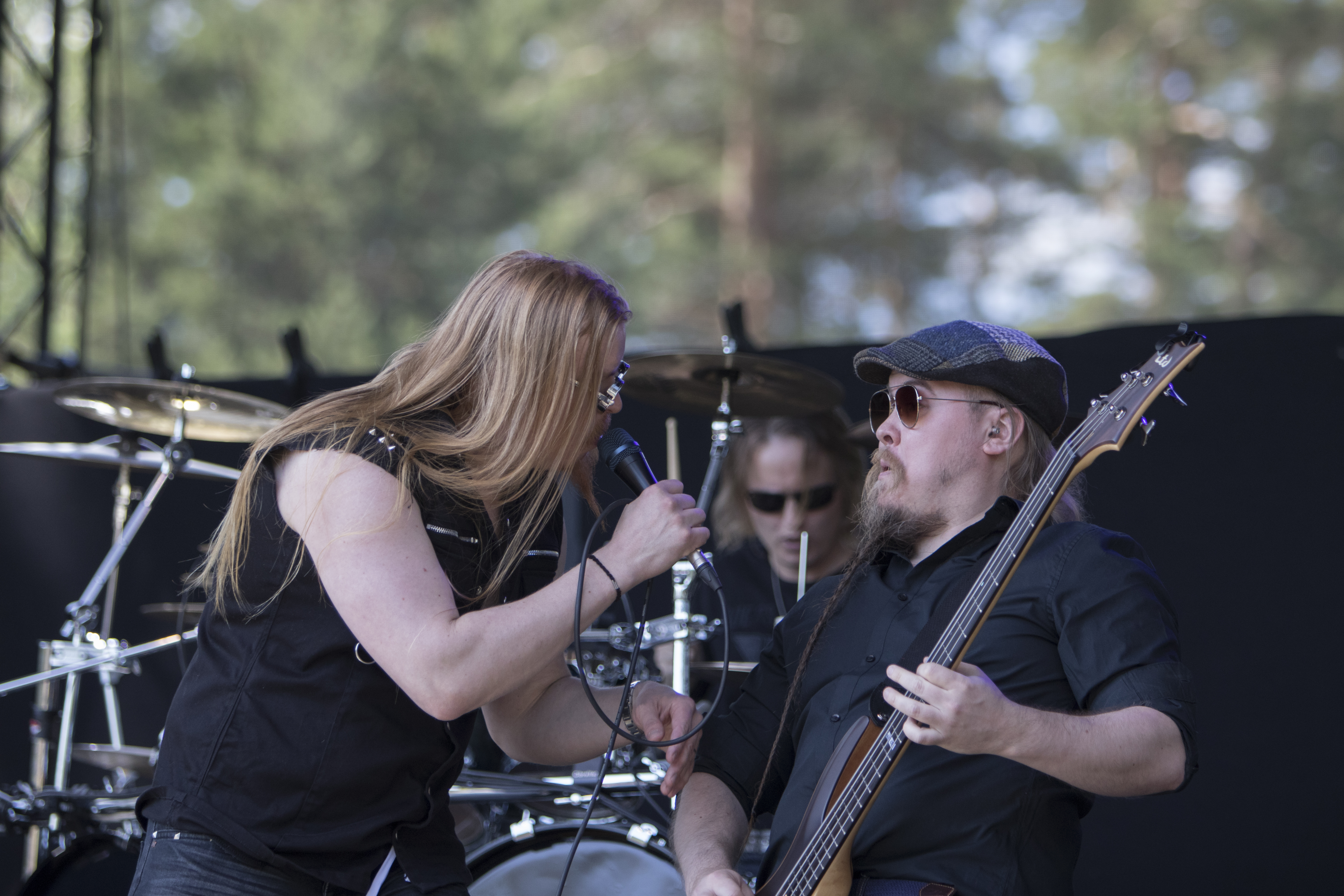
- Excalion at John Smith 2019 festival in Peurunka, Finland

Background information
- Origin: Konnevesi, Finland
- Genres: Power metal
- Years active: 2000–present
- Labels: Sound Riot, Limb
- Members: Marcus Lång; Aleksi Hirvonen; Jarmo Myllyvirta; Onni Hirvonen; Henri Pirkkalainen
- Past members: Tero Vaaja; Timo Sahlberg; Kimmo Hänninen; Jarmo Pääkkönen; Vesa Nupponen
- Website: excalion.com

Excalion is a Finnish metal band led by Jarmo Myllyvirta that has released six albums since 2005. They are largely studio-based and have toured only in their native country.

== History ==
The band was formed in December 2000 in Konnevesi, central Finland. The name came from a misspelling of Excalibur, suggested by ex-bassist Timo Sahlberg. In the autumn of 2001, Excalion recorded their first demo, Forlorn. The next two years, the band played a few gigs while working on their material. In autumn of 2003, Excalion made a second demo titled Obsession to Prosper. At the end of 2003 the band signed a deal with Sound Riot Records, and the recording of Excalion's debut album was finished at Studio Watercastle (Jyväskylä) in September 2004. The debut album, Primal Exhale, was released through Sound Riot Records in autumn 2005. In Japan it was released by Stay Gold/Art Union Records.

Early 2005, before the release, the band went through some line-up changes. Kimmo Hänninen left the band and bassist Timo Sahlberg left shortly after. When the band found a new guitarist, Vesa Nupponen, the decision was made that Tero Vaaja would switch to the bass, and Excalion would continue as a five-member band with one guitar.

In May 2006, the band began to record their second album, Waterlines. The material for this album was more melodic with a greater emphasis on the vocal lines. The recordings once again took place in Watercastle Studio while the band decided to move to Limb Music (except Japan) after issues with the previous record company. It was released 2 March 2007.

On 29 January 2010, the album High Time was released, again in Limb Music. In 2014 it was announced that Nupponen and Pääkkönen had left the band and were replaced by Marcus Lång on vocals and Aleksi Hirvonen on guitars.

On 5 July 2017, the album named Dream Alive was presented at Katse Ravintola in Jyväskylä city. This was the first show with this new material and formation with Onni Hirvonen on bass guitars.

During 2019, the band released their fifth album Emotions In September but were unable to tour in support of it as the Coronavirus pandemic halted touring for 2020.

In January 2023, Excalion released a new single called Soulbound again featuring new singer Lång along with the announcement of a full-length album entitled Once Upon a Time. A month later, the band announced the album would be released on March 24.

== Members ==
Current members

- Jarmo Myllyvirta - keyboards (2000-present)
- Onni Hirvonen - bass (2016-present)
- Henri Pirkkalainen - drums (2000-present)
- Aleksi Hirvonen - guitars (2014-present)
- Marcus Lång - vocals (2015-present)

Former members

- Timo Sahlberg - bass (2000-2005)
- Kimmo Hänninen - guitars (2000-2005)
- Jarmo Pääkkönen - vocals (2000-2014)
- Vesa Nupponen - guitars (2005-2014)
- Tero Vaaja - bass (2000-2005, 2005-2016)

== Discography ==
- Primal Exhale (2005)
- Waterlines (2007)
- High Time (2010)
- Dream Alive (2017)
- Emotions (2019)
- Once Upon a Time (2023)
