= Sono Lo Scherno =

Studio album by Krieg
- Released: 2005
- Recorded: 1998
- Genre: Black metal
- Length: 36:46
- Label: Battlekommand

Krieg chronology
Patrick Bateman (2004)	Sono Lo Scherno (2005)	Blue; Miasma (2006)

Sono Lo Scherno is the fourth studio album by black metal band Krieg. It was based on the theme of the Black Death. It was recorded in 1998. Zerstorungs Productions released a vinyl version with a bonus track, "Purteance", limited to 999 copies.

== Track listing ==
No.	Title	Length
1.	"Seven Plagues, Seven Houses"	0:52
2.	"Knights of the Holocaust"	4:49
3.	"Fallen One"	2:23
4.	"Slit Their Throats to the Spine"	4:39
5.	"Hallucinations in the Withered Eden"	3:09
6.	"Ruin Under the Burning Skies"	6:28
7.	"Maelstrom"	3:15
8.	"Plague Waltz"	1:27
9.	"Power of Darkness" (Nunslaughter cover)	2:10
10.	"Shadows of the Fallen Kingdom"	2:38
11.	"Blackash Snowfall"	2:52
12.	"Hypnotic Decay"	2:04
