= Destruction Ritual =

Studio album by Krieg
- Released: 2002
- Recorded: 1999–2001
- Studio: Vortex Sound Studio and Studio One
- Genre: Black metal
- Length: 43:41
- Label: Red Stream

Krieg chronology
| Rise of the Imperial Hordes (1998) | Destruction Ritual (2002) | Kill Yourself or Someone You Love (2002) |

Destruction Ritual is the second studio album by black metal band Krieg. It was recorded from 1999 to 2001. Duane "Cryptic Winter" Timlin did the drum work for the album. The guitar work was recorded at Vortex Sound Studio in New Jersey and drums & vocals at Studio One in Wisconsin. There was no bass played on this album.

It was rated a 4.5 out of 5 by The Metal Crypt.

== Track listing ==
| No. | Title | Length |
|---|---|---|
| 1. | "Destruction Ritual" | 5:10 |
| 2. | "To Wander the Stars..." | 4:14 |
| 3. | "The Ancient Dwells Beneath" | 4:41 |
| 4. | "As Graveyard Rites... As Darkness Falls" | 5:58 |
| 5. | "Coldwind Flame" | 5:04 |
| 6. | "The Immaculate Whore" | 4:28 |
| 7. | "Suicide Amidst Katharsis" | 1:55 |
| 8. | "A Crumbling Shrine" | 3:41 |
| 9. | "Black Ash Snowfall" | 2:36 |
| 10. | "Enhanced Soil Where Fierce Battles Once Raged" | 3:54 |
| 11. | "Still Waters Shall Remain Their Tombs" | 2:10 |

== Personnel ==
- Imperial – vocals, guitar
- Cryptic Winter – drums
