= Waterlines (album) =

Studio album by Excalion
- Released: February 28, 2007
- Recorded: May 2006
- Genre: Power metal
- Length: 52:22
- Label: Sound Riot Records / Limb Music
- Producer: Excalion

Excalion chronology
Primal Exhale (2005)	Waterlines (2007)	High Time (2010)

Professional ratings
Review scores
Source	Rating
Allmusic	3/5 stars
Metal Storm	7/10 stars
The Metal Crypt	(4.75/5)

Waterlines is the second full-length album released by the Finnish power metal/hard rock band Excalion in 2007.

== Track listing ==
1. "Wingman" - 3:57
2. "Life on Fire" - 4:13
3. "Losing Time" - 4:16
4. "Ivory Tower" - 3:49
5. "I Failed You" - 5:02
6. "Arriving As the Dark" - 3:27
7. "Streams of Madness" - 3:53
8. "Delta Sunrise" - 5:28
9. "Between the Lines" - 4:26
10. "Soaking Ground" - 6:30
11. "Yövartio" (European Bonus Track) - 3:25 (The song "Arriving as the Dark" with Finnish vocals)
12. "Access Denied" (Japanese Bonus Track) - 3:46

== Personnel ==
- Jarmo Pääkkönen - Vocals
- Vesa Nupponen - Guitars
- Jarmo Myllyvirta - Keyboards
- Tero Vaaja - Bass
- Henri Pirkkalainen - Drums
