= The Black House (album) =

Studio album by Krieg
- Released: 2004
- Genre: Black metal
- Length: 43:27
- Label: Red Stream Inc.

Krieg chronology
Kill Yourself or Someone You Love (2002)	The Black House (2004)	Patrick Bateman (2004)

The Black House is the third studio album by black metal band Krieg. Darkland Records released the vinyl version with a bonus track, "Coronation", and a poster limited to 500 blue copies.

The album was rated a three out of five by The Metal Crypt. In 2013, Decibel ranked The Black House at number 89 on its list of the Top 100 Black Metal Albums of All Time.

== Track listing ==
No.	Title	Length
1.	"Deconstructing the Eternal Tombs"	1:52
2.	"Deviant"	2:30
3.	"Nemesis"	3:04
4.	"Fleshprison Monolith"	4:05
5.	"Fallen Princes of Sightless Visions..."	6:54
6.	"A Process of Dying"	3:41
7.	"Sickening Voices Without Speech"	2:43
8.	"Ruin Under a Burning Sky"	3:05
9.	"...Without Light"	5:38
10.	"Murder Without the Burden of Conscience"	1:16
11.	"Venus in Furs" (The Velvet Underground cover)	4:39
12.	"Rooms"	1:50

== Personnel ==
- Imperial – vocals
- Phaedrus – guitar
- SM Daemon – bass
- Thron – drums
- Aazaron – additional vocals
- L Hiver – additional vocals
