= Rise of the Imperial Hordes =

Studio album by Krieg
- Released: 1998
- Recorded: October–November 1997
- Studio: Vortex Sound Studio
- Genre: Black metal
- Length: 36:43
- Label: Blood Fire Death
- Producer: Jim Forbes & Krieg

Krieg chronology
Rise of the Imperial Hordes (1998)	Destruction Ritual (2002)

Rise of the Imperial Hordes is the first studio album by black metal band Krieg. It was recorded in October & November 1997 at Vortex Sound Studio. Blood Fire Death re-issued the album in 2001 with a Havohej cover, "Enlightened Ones", as bonus track. Zerstorungs Produktionen re-issued it in 2005; this re-issue was limited to 999 copies.

== Background ==
In a 2025 interview with Bardo Methodology, Neill Jameson, founder and vocalist of the band, discussed that the album emerged from Jameson's personal struggles, including the death of his father in a plane crash and a complex family life. Influenced by early black metal bands like Darkthrone and Emperor, Jameson sought to create music that reflected his inner turmoil and the raw energy of the genre.

== Track listing ==
No.	Title	Length
1.	"The Arrival"	1:14
2.	"Alarum"	3:23
3.	"The Great Black Death"	3:04
4.	"As Humanity Fades"	3:20
5.	"My Weeping Soul (Part 2)"	2:24
6.	"Coronation"	3:37
7.	"End of Time"	4:33
8.	"Calamity from the Skies"	3:00
9.	"Reunion of the Ancients"	1:47
10.	"Path of Soth"	5:07
11.	"The Ascension"	2:24
12.	"Enlightened Ones" (Havohej cover)	2:50

Note

- The original track listing only includes the first eleven songs. The twelfth song appears as bonus track in the Blood Fire Death re-issue.

== Personnel ==
- Lord Imperial – guitar, vocals, keyboards on track 5
- Lord Soth – bass, guitars, vocals, keyboards on track 9
- Ted Tringo – keyboards
- Teloc Koraxo – drums
