= Infernum =

Polish black metal band

- Origin: Wrocław, Poland
- Genres: Black metal
- Years active: 1992–2016
- Labels: Witching Hour, Astral Wings, Sound Riot
- Website: infernum.pl

Infernum were a Polish black metal band founded in 1992 in Wrocław by Grzegorz Jurgielewicz (also known as "Anextiomarus" and "Karcharoth") and Tom Balrog playing also in Oppressor and, at present, in Baphomet's Throne. Their debut, Taur-Nu-Fuin, was one of the earliest albums of National Socialist black metal.

== History ==
Infernum was formed in 1992 in Wrocław by Jurgielewicz, who adopted the pseudonym, "Anextiomarus" (electric guitar, bass guitar, vocals). Tom Balrog (percussive instruments) was the other band member. During this time, the band recorded a demo entitled The Dawn Will Never Come (1993). Several months later, another demo entitled, Damned Majesty, was produced with the help of a keyboardist Robert Fudali (pseudonym Rob Darken) from the band Graveland. At the start of 1994, Tom Balrog left the band and was replaced by Capricornus on the drums. In 1994, the band released their debut album entitled Taur – Nu – Fuin, which was published by Astral Wings Records. This release was considered one of the pioneering works that led to so-called National Socialist black metal.

Some time after the release of their album, Infernum temporarily disbanded. Before the split, however, Infernum recorded a demo entitled When the Light Has Died including three new songs without vocals or the keyboards. It has since been circulating among the band's fans. According to Rob Darken, Jurgielewicz became an informant to the Polish authorities, who were exerting pressure on various individuals connected with black metal groups and nationalist ideologies.

In 2000, Anextiomarus together with guitarist Renfas (Oppressor), later a guitarist in Thy Worshiper, created a project called Dagon. They recorded one album.

In winter 2002, Infernum officially resumed its activities with the following line-up: Anextiomarus (vocals, electric guitar), Charon (percussive instruments), Necromanticus (electric guitar), Wolf (bass guitar) and Exterminus (keyboard instruments). They started recording an album entitled The Curse. After the recordings were finished, on 7 May 2004, Anextiomarus committed suicide, which was the after-effect of his mental condition of many years (schizophrenia). In 2006, the CD entitled The Curse was published by Sound Riot Records.

After the first split of Infernum, Rob Darken and Anextiomarus later on revived and continued their own incarnations of the band, leading to the existence of two different bands with the same name and from the same city. Darken's Infernum was against the wishes of Infernum's founder, Anextiomarus. This band released an album called Farewell, which contains material from the demo When the Light Has Died.

In 2009, Charon and Necromanticus left the band whereas Tom Balrog, one of its co-founders, returned to Infernum. The band has been recently working on a new record.

== Discography ==
- (1993) The Dawn Will Never Come (Demo)
- (1993) Damned Majesty (Demo) Witching Hour Production
- (1994) Taur – Nu – Fuin (CD Astral Wings Records)
- (1995) When the Light Has Died (unfinished material)
- (2005) Farewell (CD No Colours Records)
- (2006) The Curse (CD Sound Riot Records)

== Band members ==
=== Former members ===
- Grzegorz Jurgielewicz Anextiomarus (a.k.a. "Karcharoth") – composer, vocals, guitar (1992–2004, died 2004)
- Tom Balrog – percussion (1992–1994, 2009–2016)
- Rob Darken – keyboards (1993–2005)
- Capricornus – percussion (1994–2005)
- Exterminus – guitar, keyboards (2002–2016)
- Wolf a.k.a. Bael V.B – guitar, bass (2002–2016)
- Charon – percussion (2002–2009)
- Necromanticus – guitar (2002–2009)
