= Elysium (band) =

Polish melodic death metal band

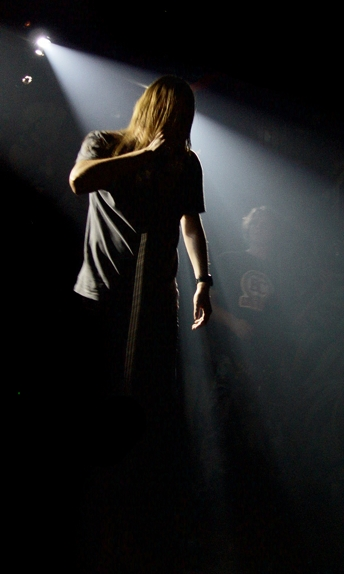
- Maciej Miskiewicz From the band Elysium during a concert in 2006

Background information
- Origin: Wrocław, Poland
- Genres: Melodic death metal
- Years active: 1996–2006
- Labels: Metal Mind Productions, Empire Records
- Members: Maciej Miskiewicz; Michał Włosik; Paweł Ulatowski; Michał Buczak
- Website: elysium.metal.pl

Elysium was a melodic death metal band from Wrocław, Poland, created in Spring 1996 by Maciej Miskiewicz (vocals), Michał Maryniak (guitar), Marcin Maryniak (bass), Mariusz Bogacz (drums) and Tomasz Kochaniec (keyboards). Half their discography was released on Metal Mind Productions, a major Polish indie label.

== Discography ==
- 1997: Sunset (Demo)
- 2000: Elysium (Elysium)
- 2000: Dreamlands (Morbid Noizz/Black Mark)
- 2001: Eclipse (Metal Mind Productions)
- 2003: Feedback (Metal Mind Productions)
- 2004: Deadline (Metal Mind Productions)
- 2005: Godfather (Empire Records)
