= Rob Darken =

Polish musician

- Also known as: Rob Darken, Darken
- Born: Robert Fudali; 15 December 1969 (age 56); Wrocław, Poland
- Genres: Black metal, pagan metal, National Socialist black metal, dungeon synth
- Occupation: Musician
- Instruments: Vocals, guitars, bass, drums, synthesizers
- Label: No Colours Records
- Member of: Graveland, Lord Wind
- Formerly of: Thoth, Infernum, Legion, Mysterial

Robert Fudali (born 15 December 1969), better known as Rob Darken, is a Polish musician and singer, best known for being the frontman for black metal band Graveland.

He has also contributed to other local bands, such as Fullmoon, Veles, Infernum, Oppressor (present Baphomets Throne), Legion, Wolfkhan, Behemoth and North, most of which as either session keyboardist or artwork contributor.

== Ideology ==
Darken sees himself as a Heathen and Christianity as the worst enemy of white Europeans. He exalts the latter's return to their ancestors' heritage, and has spoken out against "race mixing". On the Graveland EP Raise Your Sword!, he declares Heathendom to be the religion of white Europeans.

Darken has been accused of being a neo-Nazi. In response to these accusations he has stated: "I do not see any point in referring to NS because I do not see any point in referring to any ideologies that lost. It is against logic and eternal law of evolution. I think that white men should search for new ideas that would be well adapted for the current reality and the problems of [the] contemporary world." and "If you are White proud of being White and proud of your forefathers faith, if you politically incorrect, if you dare to criticize the politicians and it you point at the existence of a strong powerful Jewish lobby supporting Israel – you are called Nazi and anti-Semite. And the special institution start to persecute you. I am called 'Nazi" but no one has any proof of my Nazi background. They just repeat once heard someone else words having no proof of it." And "In Poland many people refer to Slavonic heritage as many refer to German. And I think that those who refer to Slavonic culture are the majority but they do not make big show of it. For me there is no difference between pagan beliefs of Vikings and Slavs. The names are different but the core is the same. Different stories but the same Gods with the same attributes. The ideologist of the Third Reich were responsible for the division between German Aryan world and Slavonic world. They distorted the historical facts in order to separate from Eastern world. Communist did the same but they of course favouritized [sic] Slavs." Yet, in a 2006 interview with Decibel, he stated that "Graveland is regarded as a NSBM band because of my political convictions, [which] most people would call extreme right-wing National Socialist convictions," and "people I played with were Satanists and they were not interested in paganism. Due to these differences, we finally started to walk separate ways and Graveland became [a] one-man band again. I understood that I could not support Satanism [because it] was a part of Judeo-Christian religion. In the Third Reich, Satanists would end [up] in gas chambers."

== Graveland ==
Darken started Graveland as a solo project in 1991, which later grew into a full band.

== Lord Wind ==
Darken began Lord Wind as a solo project 1994. After releasing a demo on his own label and the debut on Full Moon Productions, Darken moved to No Colours Records where he is still signed. The music of Lord Wind is characterised by epic, lengthy melodies and repeating main themes and is, according to Darken, influenced by medieval folk music, Dead Can Dance and the Conan soundtrack. His label names old folk music, music of the Middle Ages (which they claim to have been pagan, contrary to popular belief), and soundtracks as inspirations. German authors Dornbusch and Killguss describe the music as a soundtrack for historical battles, sounding like the element of war cleansed from the latter one and focussed onto its atmospheric quintessence.

Discography

- "Forgotten Songs" (1995, demo)
- Forgotten Songs (1996)
- Heralds of Fight (2000)
- Rites of the Valkyries (2001)
- Atlantean Monument (2006)
- Ales Stenar (2012)
- In to Samhain (2012, split with Mysterial)
