= Kult ov Azazel =

American black metal band

- Origin: Fort Lauderdale, Florida, United States
- Genre: Black metal
- Years active: 1998—Present
- Label: Arctic Music
- Members: Xaphan; Hammer; Armanen; Necrol; Hag
- Past members: Xul; Von; Hellspawn; Nocturath; Amduscias; Vastator
- Website: www.kultovazazel.com/

Kult ov Azazel is an American black metal band, briefly known as Azazel.

== History ==
Formed as Azazel by Xaphan and Xul in 1998, the band released the promo Forever Heaven Gone and the MCD Order of the Fly in 1999. Azazel began to play shows in Florida. After firing their original drummer, Azazel rotated drummers, eventually settling on Hellspawn. In 2000, they recorded a split CD with black metal band Krieg, and the band changed their name to Kult ov Azazel. That month, they released the promo Of Evil and Hatred. They signed to Arctic Music shortly thereafter.

Hellspawn left the band, and Vetis became their live drummer. The band recorded Triumph of Fire, their first LP. Later in 2001, the band recruited permanent drummer Hammer and second guitarist Nocturath. This lineup released Oculus Infernum. Nocturath was replaced with VJS, who first appeared with the group in 2004 when they co-headlined the Northern Lights Festival in Toronto, Canada. November of the same year, Kult ov Azazel embarked on The Swarm of Eternal Blackness Tour of the West Coast tour, and recorded the splits Feast of Sacrilegious Impurity and Through War or Suicide.

In February 2005, the band entered Mana Studios in Tampa Florida and recorded The World, The Flesh & The Devil, and toured the East Coast. In 2006, VJS was replaced with Necrol. This lineup appeared, in 2006, at the Sacrifice of the Nazarene Child 6 Festival, Night of the Black Pentecost and one Ft. Lauderdale, FL show opening for Celtic Frost.

On September 15, 2007, Kult ov Azazel headlined a show in Toronto, Canada, and a week later, was scheduled to play the Autumn Equinox Festival. Situations prevented Xul and Hammer from playing the festival. Xaphan performed with members of Krieg, Engorge, Tenebrous, and Malevolent Creation as session musicians. Valac replaced Necrol as session guitarist.

During the beginning of 2008, Kult ov Azazel reverted to a three-piece, using session members for live shows. After writing a new album in late October 2008, the band entered Mana Studios to record Destroying The Sacred. Released June 2, 2009, through Arctic Music, the album received positive reviews from American and international outlets.

Support for the album started on July 5, 2009, in Philadelphia. Kult ov Azazel co-headlined the Hostile City Death Festival with Valac as session guitarist. When rehearsing for upcoming shows in October 2009, Kult ov Azazel brought Armanen in to play live guitar. That month, the band headlined the Milwaukee Blackened Festival and a one-off show in Los Angeles, CA on Halloween night. While in Los Angeles, Xaphan and Hammer entered Black Static Studios to record a cover of "In League With Satan" for a Venom tribute/split with Teratism. December 12, 2009, Kult ov Azazel played in Puerto Rico, becoming the first black metal to perform there. This was filmed for a DVD that never came out.

At the beginning of 2010, Xul went on a sabbatical. With scheduled dates for 2010, Xaphan and Hammer promoted Armanen to a permanent position on guitars and brought back bassist VJS. This lineup embarked on the Nihilistic Terror Across Texas mini-tour, headlined the West Texas Death Festival, and played two shows with Teratism and Witchaven. Hammer was unable to tour; Tony Laureano (Angel Corpse/Nile/Dimmu Borgir) filled in on drums. In May, they completed the Nihilistic Terror Across Florida mini tour, and filmed their hometown show for a future DVD. After the Florida shows, the band was inactive from June to October, when they began rehearsing as a three-piece with Armanen on bass for the Samhain Black Metal Festival MMX in South Carolina. After this festival, the band began writing for a new album, but Arctic did not renew their contract.

In February 2011, Negativity Records offered to sign the band. Since the beginning of March, Xaphan resumed writing with Armanen, who, as of May 2011, moved to bass guitar. Guitarist Necrol returned to the band. The final months of 2011 were spent writing Violators of the Covenant. In December 2011, Forbidden Records re-issued Order Of The Fly: The Ultimate Edition with new cover art and previously unreleased tracks.

Kult ov Azazel co-headlined a show in Fort Lauderdale, Florida, with Cannibal Corpse in early 2012. In January 2012, Negativity Records released the 7-inch Kult ov Azazel/Teratism split In League With Satan. In February, Xaphan was interviewed for the black metal documentary "Out of The Black", and the band announced Amduscias on guitar/vocals. It was announced in June 2012 that Xul had returned to the band. Kult ov Azazel returned to Puerto Rico to headline the Metal Demolition Festival as a five-piece with Armanen back on guitar. By 2013, Xul took leave from the band, and Amduscias was replaced with former session guitarist Necrol. Vastator filled in on bass, and Kult ov Azazel continued as a five-piece. This lineup headlined the only show for the year in Miami, FL during the month of October at the first annual Black Kvlt Fest.

Further writing and pre-production of a new album took place in 2014. The band headlined Wrath of the Goat III & IV, with Archangel Sin Scythe (Led By Serpents/Element Of Eclipse) filling in on drums for the WotG III Festival in Wilkes-Barre, PA, and with Paul Collier (ex-Angel Corpse) filling in drums for the WotG IV in Chicago, IL. In October 2014, Hag (ex-Pact) joined the band as vocalist.

On January 1, 2016, Kult ov Azazel revealed a pre-production demo track of "Corpus Edimus, Sanguinem Bibimus" on their Facebook page. The pre-pro demo track featured a guest solo by Phil Fasciana of Malevolent Creation. At that time, the band had recorded half the album as a pre-production demo, and continued recording. Violators of the Covenant was the first album recorded with the new lineup, and the first featuring Hag (vocals), Necrol (guitar), Armanen (bass), along with Xaphan (guitar/vocals) and Hammer (drums). The ten-track album was recorded and produced by the band at S.B.S. Studio in Fort Lauderdale, FL. Once the pre-pro demo is finished, a three-song demo would be shopped around to labels for a deal.

== Members ==
Current members

- Julian "Xaphan" Hollowell - guitars, vocals (1998–present)
- John "Hammer" Goss - drums (2001–present)
- Michael "Armanen" Stancombe - bass (2010-2012, 2015–present), guitars (2009-2010, 2012–2015)
- Necrol - guitars (2006–2007, 2011–present)
- Hag - vocals (2014-2017, 2018–present)

Past members

- Xul - vocals, bass (1998–2009, 2012)
- Vaughn "Von" Glenn - drums (1998)
- Hellspawn - drums (1999–2000)
- Joshua "Nocturath" Bowens (Open Grave, Helcaraxë, Minas Tirith) - guitars (2001–2003)
- Randy "Amduscias" Piro - guitars, vocals (2012)
- Vastator - bass (2013-2015)

Past Live Session members

- Gus "Vetis" Rios (Sickness/Malevolent Creation) - drums (2000–2001), drums (2010, March Metal Massacre V)
- Imperial (Krieg) - vocals (2007, Autumn Equinox Festival)
- Mitch "MCoken" Coken (Engorge) - bass (2007, Autumn Equinox Festival)
- Marco "Valac" Martell (Malevolent Creation/Divine Empire/Against the Plagues) - guitars (2007–2009)
- VJS (Demoncy/Incursus/Tenebrous/Goreaphobia/Crimson Moon/Nightbringer) - guitars (2004–2005), drums (2007, Autumn Equinox Festival), drums (2009, Hostile City Death Festival), bass (2010)
- Tony Laureano (Angelcorpse/Nile/Dimmu Borgir/1349/Acheron/Brujeria/God Dethroned/Belphegor/Nachtmystium/Insidious Disease) - drums (2010, Nihilistic Terror Across Texas Tour)
- Kevin "Archangel Sin Scythe" Nichols (Led By Serpents/Element Of Eclipse) - drums (2014, Wrath of The Goat III Festival)
- Paul Collier (Angelcorpse/Ornament of Disgrace/Pessimist/Fistula) - drums (2014, Wrath of The Goat IV Festival and the 2016 Archons ov Darkness Tour)
- Ruston "Azagkur" Grosse - drums (2015, Reich ov Khaos mini-tour)

== Discography ==
Studio albums

- Triumph of Fire (2001)
- Order of the Fly (2002)
- Oculus Infernum (2003)
- The World, The Flesh, & The Devil (2005)
- Destroying The Sacred (2009)

Demos, EPs, and Splits

- Forever Heaven Gone (as Azazel) (1999)
- Order of the Fly (as Azazel) (1999)
- Of Evil and Hatred (2000)
- Gather Against Humanity (Split w/ Obitus, Humanicide, and ThyLord) (2001)
- Kult Ov Azazel/Krieg (Split w/ Krieg) (2001)
- Satan's Blood/Kult ov Azazel (Split EP w/ Satan's Blood) (2003)
- Grandaevus Dæmonum (2003)
- Through War or Suicide (Split w/ Horn of Valere) (2005)
- Feast of Sacrilegious Impurity (Split w/ Vrolok) (2006)
- In League With Satan (Split w/ Teratism) (2012)
- Luciferian Vengeance (2016)
- The Dawn of Luciferian Enlightenment (2017)

Compilations

- American Black Metal Assault (Infinite Darkness Records, 2000)
- Visionaries of the Macarbe Volume 2: An Evil Elite (Lost Disciple Records, 2000)
- Casting Eternal Fires Volume 1 (Spectral Arts Productions, 2002)
- Jesus Wept/Black Arts No. 1 (Black Arts Productions, 2002)
- Jesus Wept/Black Arts No. 2 (Black Arts Productions, 2003)
- Thanatos Volume 1: Between The Bloodstained Lines of Time (Lookinglassblack, 2003)
- Black Mass Consecration (2004)
- Destroyers From The Western Skies (As Night Devours The Sun) (Killzone Records, 2005)

Live album

- Assaulting the Masses (2003)
