= Nargaroth =

German black metal band

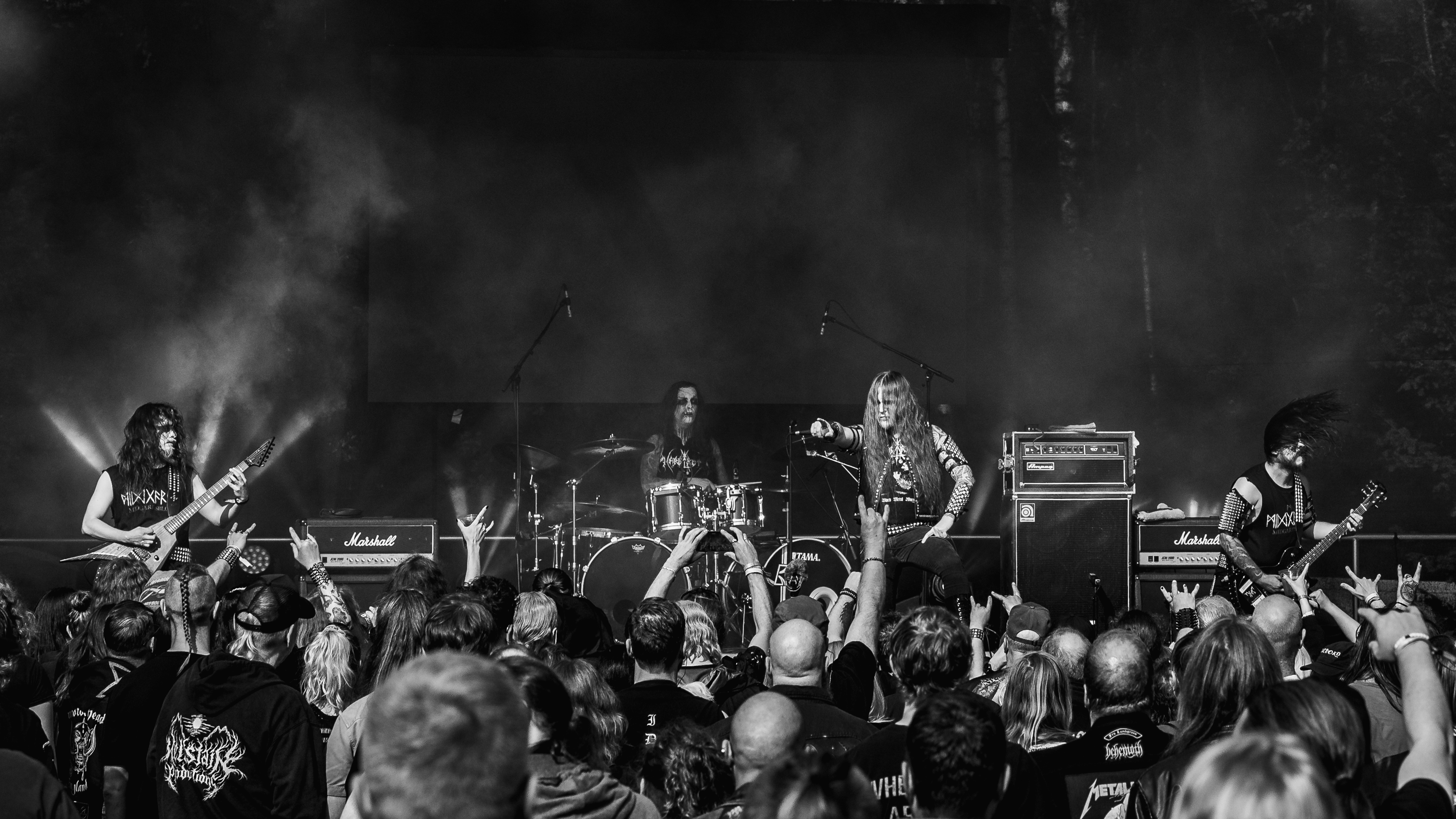
- Nargaroth at Midgardsblot, Norway, 2026.

Background information
- Origin: Germany
- Genre: Black metal
- Years active: 1996–present
- Labels: No Colours, Inter Arma Productions, Season of Mist
- Members: René "Ash" Wagner
- Past members: Akhenaten; Occulta Mors; L'hiver
- Website: www.nargaroth.de

Nargaroth is a German black metal band led by René "Ash" Wagner, previously known as "Kanwulf". The band is associated with raw and misanthropic black metal themes.

== History ==
René Wagner formed Nargaroth following the disbandment of his previous band, Exhuminenz. Exhuminez included members R.S., Charoon and Darken (not to be confused with Rob Darken of Graveland). Wagner claimed that Nargaroth was established in 1989 and had released the demo Orke in 1991 and Herbstleyd in 1993. Later statements clarified that the band was officially founded in 1996. Early Nargaroth recordings were completed in 1998, with Charoon on guitar and a drum machine.

Nargaroth released debut album Herbstleyd in December 1998 through No Colours Records. In 2000, the label released Amarok, a compilation featuring older and previously unreleased material, including an early version of Herbstleyd and a cover of Burzum. That year, they released the demo Fuck Off Nowadays Black Metal, limited to 333 cassette copies and 100 vinyl pressings by Sombre Records. A picture disc reissue followed in 2005 through No Colours Records.

In 2001, the album Black Metal ist Krieg was released. Wagner described it as a tribute to black metal. The album's artwork and lyrics were controversial, particularly the inclusion of wartime photographs of Wagner's deceased relatives who had served in the Wehrmacht during World War II. The album featured the track "The Day Burzum Killed Mayhem", which narrates the 1993 murder of Mayhem guitarist Euronymous by Varg Vikernes.

The band continued to release music throughout the early 2000s, including the Rasluka series (Rasluka Part I in 2004 and Rasluka Part II in 2002), dedicated to Wagner's former bandmate R.S., who died by suicide in 1995. The album Geliebte des Regens, recorded in the same sessions as the Rasluka series, was released in 2003. In 2004, Nargaroth released the live album Crushing Some Belgian Scum and Prosatanica Shooting Angels, initially intended to be released under a separate project named Prosatanica.

In 2007, Wagner released Semper Fidelis, a shift in his artistic approach. He stated that he was moving away from his former stage name, Kanwulf, and adopting Ash to distance himself from the black metal scene. The album was released in a standard CD format and a limited-edition box set containing various bonus items, including a DVD and personal effects.

Nargaroth performed in Mexico and Guatemala in 2008, followed by a South American tour in 2009. That year, the album Jahreszeiten was released in a limited A5 digibook format and as a double LP, with the vinyl version containing spoken introductions to each track, which were omitted from the CD edition. The band continued touring in 2010, performing in Guatemala, El Salvador, Honduras, Colombia, and Venezuela.

The album Spectral Visions of Mental Warfare was released in 2011, followed by Era of Threnody in 2017.

== René Wagner ==
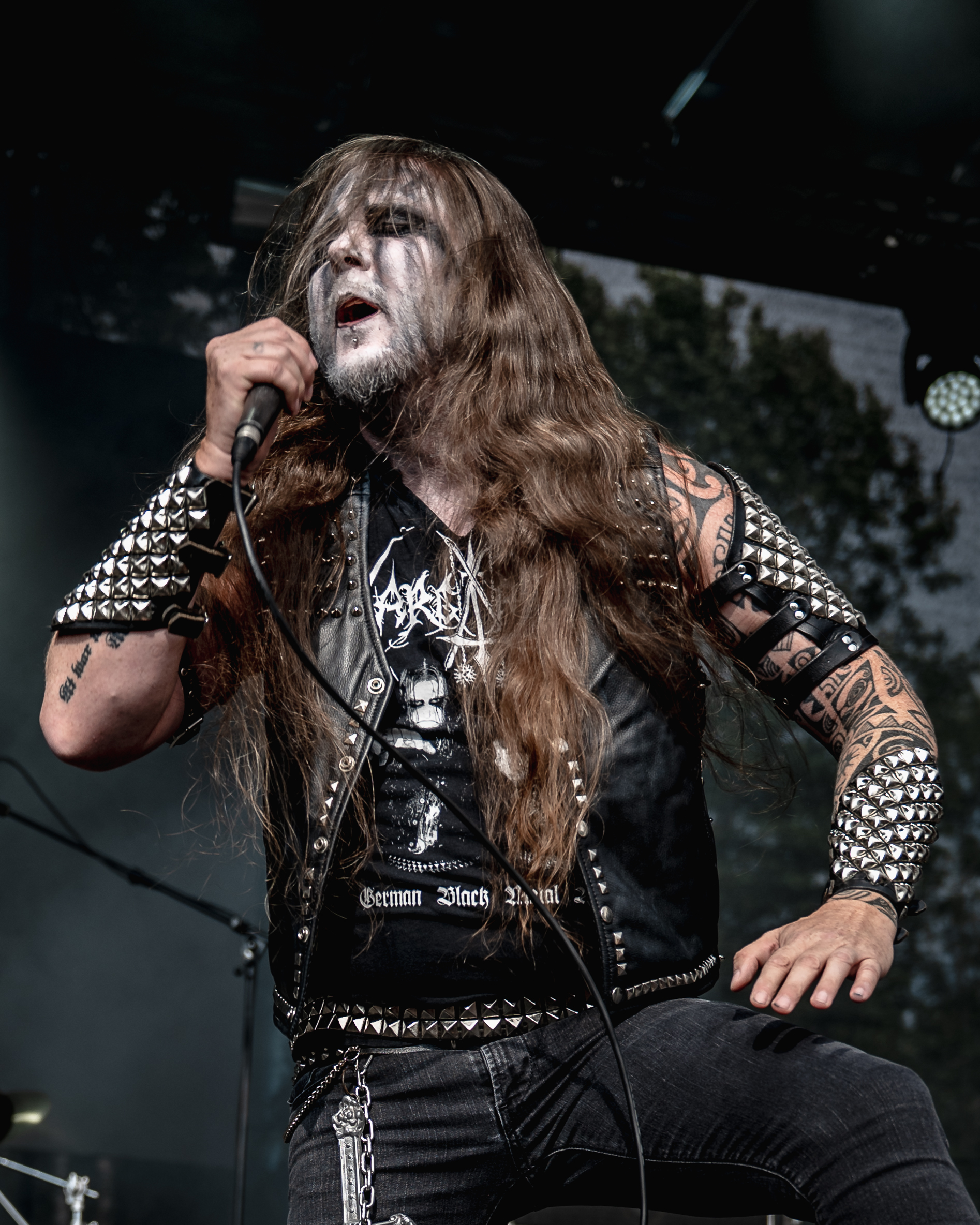
Wagner at Midgardsblot, Norway, 2026

René Wagner describes Nargaroth's music as "German Hateful and Misanthropic Metal", distinguishing it from traditional black metal, which he associates with Satanism. However, due to its musical similarities to classic black metal, Nargaroth is often categorized within the genre.

In an interview, Wagner stated that he does not support fascist ideology and views Nazism as a form of mental restriction. He cited his support for the Kriegsgräberfürsorge, a German war graves organization, and MIA International as evidence of his stance.

== Discography ==
- Orke (demo, 1998)
- Herbstleyd (demo, 1998)
- Herbstleyd (1998)
- Amarok (2000)
- Fuck Off Nowadays Black Metal (demo, 2000)
- Black Metal ist Krieg (2001)
- Rasluka Part II (2002)
- Geliebte des Regens (2003)
- Crushing Some Belgian Scum (live, 2004)
- Rasluka Part I (2004)
- Prosatanica Shooting Angels (2004)
- Semper Fidelis (2007)
- Semper Fidelis Boxset (2007)
- Jahreszeiten (2009)
- Spectral Visions of Mental Warfare (2011)
- Black Metal Manda, Hijos de Puta (live, 2012)
- Era of Threnody (2017)
- Apocalyptic Steel (2026)
