= Sound Riot Records =

- Founded: 1994
- Founder: Gilson Rodrigues; Louis Rodrigues
- Genre: Black metal Death metal Doom metal Power metal
- Country of origin: Brazil
- Official website: http://www.soundriotrecords.com/

Sound Riot Records is an independent record label founded in March 1994 in Brazil. The company started as a small mailorder service for demo-tapes and 7"EPs. In the same year, the CD distribution started and Sound Riot Records became the official distributor for European record labels such as Displeased, Misanthropy, Holy, No Fashion, Cold Meat Industry, Avantgarde Music, and among others.

The idea to running an own record label came during 1995 and the debut release came out in March 1996. In March 1999, they decided to move to Europe. Since then, the company is based in Portugal and they have signed various European black, doom, death and power metal bands such as Tristwood, Requiem, Chain Collector, Excalion, Infernum, Frostmoon and Svartsyn.

== Artists ==
- Burialmound
- Chain Collector
- Demon Child
- Excalion
- Frostmoon
- Ghost Machinery
- Grand Alchemist
- Grayscale
- Holocaust
- Inborn Suffering
- Incinerator
- Infernum
- Madog
- Nightside
- Requiem
- Rupture Christ
- Satans Blood
- Shadow Season
- Svartsyn
- Tristwood
- Unchained
- Vicious
- VII Gates
- Wish
