= Satanic Warmaster =

Finnish black metal project

- Origin: Lappeenranta, Finland
- Genre: Black metal
- Years active: 1998–present
- Label: Werewolf Records (Finland)
- Members: Werwolf

Satanic Warmaster is a Finnish black metal solo project formed in 1998 by Lauri Penttilä in Lappeenranta, who performs under the stage name Werwolf.

Satanic Warmaster has sold tens of thousands of albums worldwide without major distribution companies or record labels. The band has toured Finland, Germany, Russia, Mexico, Japan and Italy.

The Satanic Warmaster project has been commercially successful in Penttilä's home country, as his 2023 album Aamongandr reached number four on the Finnish album charts as well as number one for physical copies sold.

== History ==
Penttilä formed Satanic Warmaster in 1998, naming the project inspired after the rehearsal tape Satanic War Master (Der Führer) by Polish black metal band Lord of Evil. His pseudonym Werwolf was taken from "the lycanthropic spirit" within him, to represent "where the wolfish, hungry and predatory spirit in man are awakened and manifested."

Penttilä said that Satanism drew him to black metal, and that early on in his career he learned that major labels did not want to work with him. His musical influences include Venom, Bathory, Sarcófago, early Emperor, Immortal, Satyricon and Mayhem.

In an interview with Stereogum, he said that he liked American black metal, declaring bands such as Masochist, Wind of the Black Mountains, Grand Belial's Key and Inquisition as "some of the best bands I've ever heard."

In 2004, he started his own label, Werewolf Records.

In 2014, Satanic Warmaster's fifth album Fimbulwinter became the project's first to enter the Finnish album charts, reaching No. 14.

In 2023, Satanic Warmaster's sixth album Aamongandr became its best-selling release yet, debuting at No. 4 in Finland and No. 1 on the Finnish physical sales chart.

== Controversies and boycotts ==
In 2008, multiple Finnish newspapers published articles about Furore Finnum organizing a concert of neo-Nazi bands, featuring Satanic Warmaster, alongside Goatmoon and Der Stürmer, opening for the National Socialist black metal (NSBM) band Absurd in the cities Tampere and Turku. Werwolf claimed that "the interpretations of the lyrics of the bands' songs [were] insane." Werwolf does not categorize Satanic Warmaster as NSBM, saying "The 'NSBM' label has always come from the outside. I'd never call my music that."

Satanic Warmaster was removed from the 2011 Hellfest lineup in France after backlash from other artists and members of the audience threatening the festival with violence. In response, Werwolf said: "Just to make sure everyone has their labels right, Satanic Warmaster's ideology is Satanism and music style black metal. Whoever claims otherwise does so only because of personal feelings and/or resentment." The festival organizers stated "we have received a large number of complaints partly from festival-goers but also from artists, considering this artist to be conflicting with the festival's state of mind, and ready to settle things with a fight."

In 2014, a Satanic Warmaster show in the Netherlands was cancelled, according to Werwolf, due to direct threats to the booking agencies and organizers from anti-fascist groups.

In 2016, Satanic Warmaster's United Kingdom debut was forced to move to another location that was undisclosed until before the concert, as the initial venue in Glasgow backed out once "members of the public" highlighted the project's supposed links to neo-Nazism. Publications such as Vice have noted how references to Nazism show up in Satanic Warmaster's lyrics, song titles and participations on compilation albums, including the song title "My Dreams of 8" (the song refers to Adolf Hitler), lyrics of the song "Wolves of Blood and Iron", and the band's contributions to a 2006 Black Metal compilation titled Declaration of Anti-Semitic Terror. The concert organizer also commented the matter with "We do not support anything racially/politically motivated therefore we booked the show in good faith for the black metal community and if they were a direct racist band then we would never have booked it."

== Ideology ==
Satanic Warmaster's lyrics deal mainly with nature, folklore, Satanism, and "occult and warlike themes".

In a 2003 interview for the Finnish metal webzine Imperiumi, Werwolf explained his personal beliefs in a detailed manner: "Pan-European traditional Satanism is a comprehensive ideological and philosophical alignment, which aims for the bettering of an individual and the most beneficial elbow space through the acknowledgement (and partially harnessing) of the dark and destructive (and thus initially creative) force of nature and cosmos. Excluding anything has never been the best option. Satanism constitutes my world view about 100%".

In context to his music he explained the reflection of his ideology into his music even further: "Lyrically Satanic Warmaster is a reflection of the Luciferian spirit through the eyes of a young man. I deal with subjects personally and mainly in a very symbolic way. For example I've written symbolic tales of creation and rebirth influenced by folklore, and totalist and elitist visions of what Black Metal's brotherhood should be like. I'm driven to do all this by the flame that burns in my music, the (artistic) aspirations of a man and the light of the black star of the dark lord of nature".

In January 2015 Werwolf explained his ideology and the protests towards his music even further, "If someone becomes a "nazi" just by working with or hanging around "the wrong kind of people", should it not be true in all possible contexts? Unless it is all about the effort of trying to sand down the sharpest edges of modern music. Personally, I could never tie Satanic Warmaster down to the concept of NSBM for the reasons that have been there from 1998: It would not coincide with my conviction and the thoughts I want to convey through my music. To see me crush all the chains of an Abrahamic religion and proclaim my victory in the most insulting way possible, or me seeing good, evil, or lies where, according to political correctness, none should exist, it takes a twisted mind to see all this as a reflection of some political dogma. As I have said before and will say once again: The ideology behind Satanic Warmaster is Satanism and the musical style is black metal. Those, who claim otherwise, do it on the basis of their own feelings and resentment".

== Members ==
=== Current members ===
- Werwolf (Lauri Penttilä) – vocals, all instruments (1998–present)

=== Former members ===
- Lord War Torech – guitars (2000-2005)

=== Live members ===
- Vholm – drums
- Pete Talker – bass
- Fyrdkal – guitars

=== Former session members ===
- Lord Sargofagian – drums
- Nigrantium – session drums
- T. H. – guitars

== Discography ==
=== Studio albums ===
- Strength and Honour (2001)
- Opferblut (2003)
- Carelian Satanist Madness (2005)
- Nachzehrer (2010)
- Fimbulwinter (2014)
- Aamongandr (2022)
- Exultation of Cruelty (2024)
- Drachenkreuz (2026)

=== EPs ===
- Black Katharsis (2002)
- ...Of the Night (2004)
- Revelation (2007)
- Ondskapens Makt / Forgotten Graves (2010)
- Winter's Hunger / Torches (2011)
- In Eternal Fire / Ghost Wolves (2012)

=== Split releases ===
- 2003 – Hold On to Your Dreams (single; split with Krieg)
- 2003 – The True Face of Evil (single; split with The True Frost)
- 2004 – March of the Legion Werwolf (EP; split with Akitsa)
- 2004 – Satanic Warmaster & Clandestine Blaze (album; split with Clandestine Blaze)
- 2006 – A Hymn for the Black Empire (single; split with Stuthoff)
- 2007 – The Chant of the Barbarian Wolves (single; split with Aryan Blood)
- 2007 – Dark Hymns (EP; split with Mütiilation & Drowning the Light)
- 2008 – Southern / Carelian Black Metal Holocaust (single; split with Evil)
- 2008 – Where Eternity Awaits (EP; split with Behexen)
- 2009 – Majesty of Wampyric Blood (single; split with Totenburg)
- 2015 – Lux Satanae (Thirteen Hymns of Finnish Devil Worship) (album; split with Archgoat)

=== Other ===
- 2000 – Bloody Ritual (demo)
- 2005 – Black Metal Kommando / Gas Chamber (compilation)
- 2007 – Black Metal Massacre Live (live recording)
- 2007 – Werewolf Hate Attack (live recording)
- 2008 – Revelation ...of the Night (compilation)
- 2010 – We Are the Worms that Crawl on the Broken Wings of an Angel (compilation)
- 2014 – Death Live 2012 (live recording 2012)
- 2014 – Luciferian Torches (compilation)
