= Judas Iscariot (band) =

American black metal band

- Origin: DeKalb, Illinois, U.S.
- Genre: Black metal
- Years active: 1992–2002
- Labels: End All Life; Moribund; No Colours; Elegy
- Past members: Akhenaten

Judas Iscariot was an American black metal band. It began in 1992 as the solo project of Andrew Harris, who performed as Akhenaten (after the Egyptian Pharaoh of the same name).

Duane Timlin (a.k.a. Cryptic Winter) joined the band as a session drummer on Heaven in Flames (1999). During 1999 and 2000, Akhenaten twice performed live with members from Nargaroth, Krieg, Absu and Maniac Butcher.

After relocating to Germany, Akhenaten announced the end of Judas Iscariot on August 25, 2002.

In 2018, Blake Judd, also known as "Azentrius", re-released several Judas Iscariot recordings, falsely claiming that Akhenaten officially authorized them.

== Ideology ==
Akhenaten considered the story of the band Judas Iscariot as documentation of one individual's struggle against the moral boundaries set by Christianity. Furthermore, he expressed contempt towards capitalism, which he dismissed as inextricably linked to materialism. Akhenaten stated that his music was intended to give others strength to live in a world compromised by materialism and irrational religious ideology.

Some of the lyrics on early Judas Iscariot albums are borrowed from the works of English poet and Christian mystic William Blake, as well as from English poet Percy Bysshe Shelley, fundamental for understanding the connection between Dark Romanticism, the esoteric and their connection to heavy metal lyrics.

Akhenaten repeatedly denied association with the National Socialist black metal movement. In an interview he stated "Judas Iscariot is no Nazi band. I myself am no Nazi either [...] If other bands think they have to include politics into their music, it's their business, but this has nothing to do with my band."

== Band members ==
- Akhenaten (Andrew Harris) – vocals, guitar, bass, drums (1992–2002)

Session members

- Cryptic Winter (Duane Timlin) – drums (1999–2002)

Touring members

- Ash (René Wagner) – guitar (2000)
- Lord Imperial (Neill Jameson) – bass (1999–2000)
- Proscriptor (Russley Randel Givens) – drums (1999)
- Butcher (Jan Kapák) – drums (2000)

== Discography ==
=== Full-length albums ===
- The Cold Earth Slept Below (1996)
- Thy Dying Light (1996)
- Of Great Eternity (1997)
- Distant in Solitary Night (1999)
- Heaven in Flames (2000)
- To Embrace the Corpses Bleeding (2002)

=== EPs ===
- Arise, My Lord (1996)
- Dethroned, Conquered and Forgotten (2000)
- March of the Apocalypse (2002)
- Moonlight Butchery (2002)
- Midnight Frost (To Rest with Eternity) (2003)

=== Split albums ===
- Judas Iscariot/Weltmacht (with Weltmacht) (1999)
- None Shall Escape the Wrath (with Krieg, Eternal Majesty and Macabre Omen) (2000)
- To the Coming Age of Intolerance (with Krieg) (2001)

=== Live releases ===
- Under the Black Sun (2000)

=== Compilation albums ===
- From Hateful Visions (2000)
- American Black Metal Assault (2001)
- Аветињски плес сабласти (Serbian exclusive cassette release limited to 300 copies) (2002)

=== Demos ===
- Heidegger (1992)
- Judas Iscariot (1993)
