= No Colours Records =

German record label

Coordinates: 51.250°N 13.007°E

No Colours Records is a German mail order and record label from Mügeln specialized in black metal.

== Background ==
No Colours Records mostly releases black metal records, but has also released records related to other extreme metal genres such as thrash and death metal. Most releases appear both on CDs and as limited vinyl editions. Furthermore, the label sells merchandising articles such as T-shirts and embroidered patches.

The label's most well-known bands are Inquisition, Graveland and Nargaroth. No Colours has also released many of Rob Darken's side projects such as Lord Wind and Infernum. Besides neo-nazi bands such as Thor's Hammer from Poland, the label has also signed many apolitical bands like Wigrid and Suicidal Winds, so some are against an association to the far-right.

== History ==
Steffen Zopf founded No Colours Records in 1993 as a label and mail order for black metal records and merchandise. Among his first releases are Dimmu Borgir's first album For all tid and most releases by Graveland after their departure from Lethal Records. In 1996, the label released both Absurd's and Falkenbach's debut albums. Absurd's Asgardsrei EP was also financed by Zopf but released under the name "IG Farben Production".

In 1999, Nargaroth, another controversial black metal band, was signed. On October 6, 1999, there was a raid by the German police. Besides No Colours label, Christhunt Productions, and Darker Than Black—the former label of Absurd members Hendrik and Ronald Möbus—were also raided.

In 2003, Finnish black metal band Satanic Warmaster was signed to No Colours Records.

The year 2004 witnessed the US/Colombian band Inquisition signing No Colours Records. Inquisition later parted ways with the label.

Ukrainian pagan/National Socialist band Nokturnal Mortum was signed in 2005.

== Reception ==
Rock Hard and Searchlight magazines see No Colours as a company serving the NSBM scene.

German media also reported about the label while reporting about the mob attacks that occurred on August 19, 2007. German newspaper TAZ reported the label was recommended as a "national mail order" in a Nazi internet forum. Nevertheless, the saxonian Verfassungsschutz does not agree with that classification and denies observation.
