= Graveland =

Polish pagan black metal band

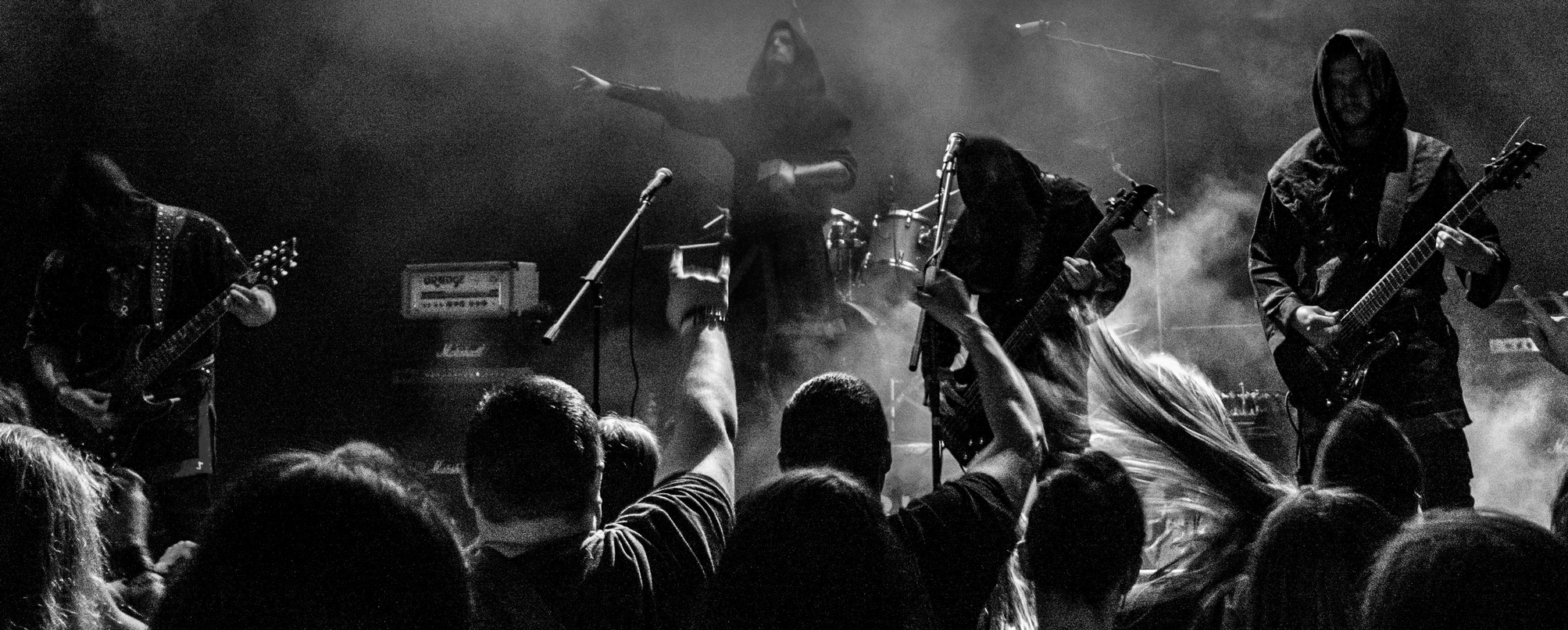
- Graveland (Kolovorot, Kharkiv 2017)

Background information
- Origin: Wrocław, Poland
- Genres: Pagan metal, black metal, viking metal
- Years active: 1991–present
- Labels: A Fine Day to Die; Atramentum; Beverina; Darkland; Drakkar; Dread; Eastclan; Eastside; Evil Rising; Eternal Devils; Forever Plagued; Hammer of Damnation; Heavy Metal Rock; Hellfire; Heritage; Inferna Profundus; Isengard; Kolovrat; Lethal; Malferna; Nawia; Night Birds; No Colours; Odium; Red Stream; Resistance; Signal; Sons of Hell; The Oath; Those Opposed; Warheart; Werewolf; Witches Sabbath; Witching Hour; White Wolf Productions; Wolftower
- Members: Rob Darken; Skyth; M. Ahrin
- Past members: Capricornus; Karcharoth; Miro; Zbych; Bor; Sigrunar; Mścisław; Draugir
- Website: graveland.org

Graveland are a Polish pagan black metal band which was formed in 1991 by Rob Darken (born Robert Fudali). They began as a black metal band before adopting a pagan and Viking metal style. The band's themes are frequently associated with the National Socialist black metal scene. The lyrics and imagery of Graveland are strongly inspired by European mythology, nature, winter and war. Their early work focused on Celtic and Slavic mythology, while their later work focuses on Norse mythology and Wotanism.

== History ==
=== Beginning ===
Darken, who started Graveland as a solo project in 1991, was influenced by bands such as Bathory and Emperor. He recorded the first demos, Necromanteion and Drunemeton, working alone. In 1993, drummer Maciej "Capricornus" Dąbrowski joined the band, which then recorded In the Glare of Burning Churches. In 1994 the two were joined by Grzegorz "Karcharoth" Jurgielewicz (previously of Infernum) and recorded The Celtic Winter, which was released as an EP by the German label No Colours Records. No Colours currently releases the band's new albums.

=== First albums ===
A few months later, the band's first album, Carpathian Wolves (recorded at the Radio PRO-FM Studio, Opole, 26 Apr – 2 May 1994), was released by Eternal Devils Records. With Carpathian Wolves, the band drew the attention of several bigger metal labels and was eventually signed by the Austrian Lethal Records label, which released Thousand Swords. This album was recorded in December 1994 at Tuba Studio, Wrocław, "in the days of eternal winter & frozen night of full moon, at the gates of a new era". The Lethal Records release showed a progression in Graveland's sound from raw black metal to black metal with folk and Viking metal influence to it. The album is considered to be the band's best release by many fans and a classic in the black metal scene. After reportedly making several racist statements, the band was dropped by Lethal. Darken then founded his own label, Isengard (later Eastclan), and re-released an extended Thousand Swords on cassette. The album's booklet contains statements against Lethal Records and two other bigger metal labels, Osmose and Nuclear Blast. In 1999, the album was re-released, again, by No Colours with another different album cover. In 2001, it was re-released for a second time by No Colours on CD and vinyl. The CD version had the logo in red and the vinyl version had a red logo. The CD and vinyl versions had different covers from each other.

=== Move towards folk ===
The band's third album, Following the Voice of Blood, was recorded 25 September 1996 – 18 December 1996 and released in 1997 via No Colours. With the 1998 album, Immortal Pride (strongly influenced by the movie soundtrack of Conan the Barbarian), the band took on a folk style, while moving more into Viking metal. Its sound became more epic, symphonic and added more keyboards and chorales. The songs also became much longer. (For instance, Immortal Pride consists of four songs: two of them being the intro and outro; and the other ones being 24 and 17 minutes long.)

In 2000, Raiders of Revenge (a split release with the RAC band Honor) and Creed of Iron / Prawo Stali were released. Since Creed, Darken has worked without Capricornus on drums.

In November 2015, it was announced that Rob Darken had assembled a live lineup and Graveland would play its very first live shows in April 2016.

On 22 February 2018, the band released a re-recorded version of ''Dawn of Iron Blades'' with new keyboards, drums, bass and female vocals. The band released the single "Possessed by Steel" on 14 April 2020. Hour of Ragnarok the band's 13th studio album of original material was released on 23 August 2021 through Inferna Profundus Records.

== Ideology ==
Darken sees himself as a Heathen and Christianity as the worst enemy of white Europeans. He exalts the latter's return to their ancestors' heritage, and has spoken out against "race mixing". On the Graveland EP Raise Your Sword!, he declares Heathendom to be the religion of white Europeans.

Darken has been accused of being a neo-Nazi. In response to these accusations he has stated: "I do not see any point in referring to NS because I do not see any point in referring to any ideologies that lost. It is against logic and eternal law of evolution. I think that white men should search for new ideas that would be well adapted for the current reality and the problems of [the] contemporary world." and "If you are White proud of being White and proud of your forefathers faith, if you politically incorrect, if you dare to criticize the politicians and it you point at the existence of a strong powerful Jewish lobby supporting Israel – you are called Nazi and anti-Semite. And the special institution start to persecute you. I am called 'Nazi" but no one has any proof of my nazi background. They just repeat once heard someone else words having no proof of it." And "In Poland many people refer to Slavonic heritage as many refer to German. And I think that those who refer to Slavonic culture are the majority but they do not make big show of it. For me there is no difference between pagan beliefs of Vikings and Slavs. The names are different but the core is the same. Different stories but the same Gods with the same attributes. The ideologist of the Third Reich were responsible for the division between German Aryan world and Slavonic world. They distorted the historical facts in order to separate from Eastern world. Communist did the same but they of course favouritized [sic] Slavs." Yet, in a 2006 interview with Decibel, he stated that "Graveland is regarded as a NSBM band because of my political convictions, [which] most people would call extreme right-wing National Socialist convictions," and "people I played with were Satanists and they were not interested in paganism. Due to these differences, we finally started to walk separate ways and Graveland became [a] one-man band again. I understood that I could not support Satanism [because it] was a part of Judeo-Christian religion. In the Third Reich, Satanists would end [up] in gas chambers."

== Band members ==
Current members

- Robert "Rob Darken" Fudali – guitars, vocals, synthesizers (1991–present)
- M. Ahrin – drums (2020–present)
- Skyth – bass (2020–present)

Former members

- Maciej "Capricornus" Dąbrowski – drums (1993–1999)
- Grzegorz "Karcharoth" Jurgielewicz – bass (1993–1995)
- Bartosz "Bor" Boruszewski – guitars (2015–2019)
- Zbigniew "Zbych" Ropicki – guitars (2015–2016)
- Piotr "Mścisław" Bajus – bass, guitars (2015–2018)
- Mirosław "Miro" Rosiński – drums (2015–2016)
- Maciej "Draugir" Twarowski – guitars (2016–2019)
- Krzysztof "Sigrunar" Saran – drums (2016–2019)

Live members

- Arkadiusz "Aro" Jęczmionka – drums (2016–2020)

Timeline

== Discography ==
Studio albums

- Carpathian Wolves (1994)
- Thousand Swords (1995)
- Following the Voice of Blood (1997)
- Immortal Pride (1998)
- Creed of Iron / Prawo Stali (2000) (released in English and Polish versions)
- Memory and Destiny (2002)
- The Fire of Awakening (2003)
- Dawn of Iron Blades (2004)
- Fire Chariot of Destruction (2005)
- Will Stronger Than Death (2007)
- Spears of Heaven (2009)
- Thunderbolts of the Gods (2013)
- Ogień przebudzenia (2014) (re-recording of The Fire of Awakening in Polish)
- 1050 Years of Pagan Cult (2016) (re-recording of songs from the band's old demos and studio albums)
- The Fire of Awakening (2017) (re-recording of the album of the same name from 2003)
- Dawn of Iron Blades (2018) (re-recording of the album of the same name from 2004)
- Hour of Ragnarok (2021)

EPs and splits

- The Celtic Winter (1994)
- Impaler's Wolves (1999)
- Raiders of Revenge (2000) (split EP with Honor)
- Raise Your Sword! (2001)
- Blood of Heroes (2002)
- Eastern Hammer (2007) (split EP with Nokturnal Mortum, North and Temnozor)
- Wotan Mit Mir (2008)
- Cold Winter Blades (2010)
- Tribute to the King of Aquilonia (2010)
- Ogień Wilczych Serc (Fire of Wolfish Hearts) (2012) (split EP with Biały Viteź)
- The Spirit Never Dies (2016) (split with Nokturnal Mortum)

Demos and promo tapes

- Necromanteion (1992)
- Promo June '92 (1992)
- Drunemeton (1992)
- Epilogue (1993)
- In the Glare of Burning Churches (1993)
- The Celtic Winter (1993)
- Following the Voice of Blood (1997)
- Resharpening Thousand Swords (2014)
- Carpathian Wolves – Rehearsal 1993 (2016)
