= Ván Records =

German record label

- Founded: 2004
- Country of origin: Germany

Ván Records is a German record label based in Herzogenrath. It was founded in 2004 by Sven Dinninghoff, who was a member of Black Metal bands Nagelfar and Graupel in the mid-1990s. The label was founded in the environment of Wòd-Ván, an association of Black Metal fans near Aachen, which was founded by Dinninghoff and other members of Nagelfar. Under contract are mainly German and Dutch bands, but also American bands like Škan or Svartidauði from Iceland.

== History ==
The label's first release was the album Unlock the Shrine by The Ruins of Beverast. While the early releases are all related to the Black Metal or related genres, later albums by Doom Metal and Hard rock bands as well as related styles were also published, bands like The Devil's Blood and Vanderbuyst, both founded by former members of the Dutch metal band Powervice.

In 2011, Ván Records cooperated for the first time with music magazines. The Burning by The Devil's Blood was released that way, as an addition to the regular label release as 7" single, both as a CD supplement of the Rock Hard Magazine as well as the Sweden Rock magazine, each with exclusive bonus titles.

In addition to their own releases, most of which are available as CD and record, Ván Records also releases LP versions of albums by various non-label bands such as Count Raven and Wolves in the Throne Room.

In 2015, the Acherontic Arts festival was held in Oberhausen, celebrating the 10th anniversary of the label. The festival proceeded in 2016 and 2017, but paused in 2018.

== Selected releases ==
- 2004: The Ruins of Beverast · Unlock the Shrine
- 2006: Nagelfar · Virus West (re-release)
- 2006: The Ruins of Beverast · Rain upon the Impure
- 2006: Truppensturm · Truppensturm (EP)
- 2007: Truppensturm · Fields of Devastation
- 2008: The Devil's Blood · The Graveyard Shuffle (single)
- 2008: The Devil's Blood · Come Reap (EP)
- 2009: Fluisterwoud · Laat alle hoop varen
- 2009: Griftegård · Solemn, Sacred, Severe
- 2009: Nagelfar · Hünengrab im Herbst (re-release)
- 2009: The Devil's Blood · I’ll Be Your Ghost (Single)
- 2009: The Devil's Blood · The Time of No Time Evermore
- 2009: The Ruins of Beverast · Foulest Semen of a Sheltered Elite
- 2009: Urfaust · Einsiedler (EP)
- 2010: Burden · A Hole in the Shell
- 2010: Graupel · Am Pranger…
- 2010: Nagelfar · Srontgorrth (re-release)
- 2010: Tauthr · Life-Losing
- 2010: Truppensturm · Salute to the Iron Emperors
- 2010: Urfaust · Der freiwillige Bettler
- 2010: Vanderbuyst · Vanderbuyst
- 2011: Necros Christos · Doom of the Occult
- 2011: The Devil's Blood · Fire Burning (single)
- 2011: The Ruins of Beverast · Enchanted by Gravemould (compilation)
- 2011: The Devil's Blood · The Thousandfold Epicentre
- 2012: Wolves in the Throne Room · Wolves in the Throne Room (re-release)
- 2012: Year of the Goat · Angels' Necropolis
- 2013: The Devil's Blood · III: Tabula Rasa or Death and the Seven Pillars
- 2013: Helrunar/Árstíðir Lífsins · Fragments – A Mythological Excavation
- 2013: Atlantean Kodex · The White Goddess
- 2018: Antlers · beneath.below.behold
- 2018: Svartidauði · Revelations of the Red Sword
- 2018: Sulphur Aeon · The Scythe of Cosmic Chaos
