= Katharsis (band) =

German band

- Genres: Black metal
- Years active: 1994–present
- Labels: Norma Evangelium Diaboli
- Members: Drakh; Scorn; Aeshma
- Past members: D. Lohenburg
- Website: http://www.kthrss.de/

Katharsis are a German black metal band.

== Biography ==
Katharsis were formed in 1994 without a band name, which they got shortly after. Their first demo cassette Terror, Storm and Darkest Arts was released in 1996; the same year, MK and Scorn also played in short-lived project Deathcult. While The Red Eye of Wrath was recorded by Scorn and D. Lohenburg, Drakh took over guitar, drums and vocals on the split EP Determination Detestation Devastation with Nhaavah. In 2000 the band's debut album 666, limited to 200 copies and featuring M. K. on drums, was released. In 2001 several split releases, one contribution to a compilation and the Rehearsal Tape for 2nd LP 2001 A.B. were released; the latter contained four advance tracks for the second album and was explicitly “not for trade”.

The last Katharsis interview was given by Drakh in April 2002 to the Horrible Eyes from Chemnitz. The same year, a split EP with Black Witchery was released.

The four tracks from the Rehearsal Tape for 2nd LP 2001 A.B. were released on the second album Kruzifixxion, published via Norma Evangelium Diaboli in 2003. In 2006, their next album VVorldVVithoutEnd and the song Archaic Ritual Infanticide in Obeyssance Towards Hell, contributed to the compilation Tormenting Legends Part II released by Blut & Eisen Productions and W.T.C. Productions, were released. Apart from this song, all recordings since 2003 were released via Norma Evangelium Diaboli. German Rock Hard magazine featured Kruzifixxion and VVorldVVithoutEnd on the list 250 Black-Metal-Alben, die man kennen sollte (‘250 black metal albums you should know’).

== Musical style and ideology ==
Katharsis play traditional black metal. Alexander von Meilenwald (ex-Nagelfar, The Ruins of Beverast) called 666 one of the five most important German black metal releases and Kruzifixxion “by far the best traditional black metal album from Germany”. When asked which German bands were worth a listen, he replied: “Listen to Katharsis, then you will know how Darkthrone should sound today.” MkM of Antaeus described Katharsis as one of the black metal bands that "combine great musical work with strong ideology and are definitely among the most devoted individuals within the scene".

The band stand for a religious, theistic Satanism. Drakh points out he is “not interested in Paganism, nor its rebirth, whatever the alleged roots of some Satanic rituals or images might be”, and not to “give a fuck for political radicalism in Metal, e.g. the (pseudo-)pagan racial nationalisms, or other philanthropic shit”, nor to be interested in secular politics, although “a mockery of and hostility against human civilization/culture and its religious aspects has political implications”. Their second demo cassette stated that “Katharsis strongly disdains any form of so-called ‘sophisticated’ or ‘political’ Black Metal. Misanthropy towards everyone !”, and Drakh expressed the view that “everybody who really believes in those stupid ‘14 words’ meaning, belongs into the oven, too”; the original statement by white nationalist David Lane, “We must secure the existence of our people and a future for White children”, was altered by the band and printed on several of their releases, either as “We must secure total annihilation of humanity and end all life on this planet” or “We must secure the depravation of the children and ruin the whole fucking world”.

== Lineup ==
- Drakh (Axel Salheiser) - vocals, formerly guitar and drums
- Scorn - guitar, bass
- Aeshma - drums

=== Past members ===
- D. Lohenburg - vocals
- M.K. - drums

== Discography ==
- 1996: Terror, Storm and Darkest Arts (Demo)
- 1997: Intoendlesschaos (Demo; Chanteloup Creations)
- 1998: The Red Eye of Wrath (Demo; Steeldawn Inc.)
- 1999: Determination Detestation Devastation (split EP with Nhaavah; Sombre Records)
- 1999: Trident Trinity (split MC with Deathcult; Sombre Records)
- 1999: Rehearsal 99 (Demo)
- 2000: 666 (Sombre Records)
- 2001: Black Metal Endsieg (split EP with S.V.E.S.T., Warloghe and Black Witchery; Sombre Records)
- 2001: Watchtowers of Darkness / Supreme Black Forces of Steel (split EP with Moonblood; Sombre Records)
- 2001: Rehearsal Tape for 2nd LP 2001 A.B. (Demo)
- 2001: Extermination auf Black Metal Blitzkrieg (End All Life Productions)
- 2002: Katharsis / Black Witchery (Split-EP with Black Witchery; Sombre Records)
- 2003: Kruzifixxion (Norma Evangelium Diaboli, N:C:U)
- 2006: VVorldVVithoutEnd (Norma Evangelium Diaboli)
- 2006: Archaic Ritual Infanticide in Obeyssance Towards Hell on Tormenting Legends Part II (Blut & Eisen Productions, W.T.C. Productions)
- 2009: Antaeus / Katharsis (split EP with Antaeus; Norma Evangelium Diaboli)
- 2009: Fourth Reich (Norma Evangelium Diaboli, W.T.C. Productions)
