= Með hamri =

Studio album by Misþyrming
- Released: 16 December 2022
- Recorded: March–July 2022
- Studio: Studio Sýrland and Gryfjan
- Genre: Black metal
- Length: 43:31
- Language: Icelandic
- Label: Norma Evangelium Diaboli

Misþyrming chronology
Algleymi (2019)	Með hamri (2022)	Með hamri í lifandi formi (2023)

Með hamri (Icelandic: With a hammer) is the third studio album by Icelandic black metal band Misþyrming, released on 16 December 2022 by Norma Evangelium Diaboli. The album received positive reviews from music critics. Með hamri is the band's first album to feature new drummer Magnús Skúlason.

== Background and recording ==
In an interview with The Reykjavík Grapevine, vocalist, guitarist and songwriter D.G. stated that Með hamri is "a very aggressive and bitter manifesto". According to him, Misþyrming's previous album, Algleymi, was more emotional, whereas Með hamri is "the darkest album of the band; violent, with dark soundscapes". Two months before the recording of the album, the band replaced their drummer Helgi Rafn Hróðmarsson, as he was living abroad and working with him from a distance did not work out. He was replaced by Magnus Skúlason from Svartidauði. The drums were recorded in one day at Stúdio Sýrland. The entire recording process lasted from March to July 2022.

According to D.G., the album was influenced by the desire to go beyond their tried and tested methods, to reach greater extremes and depths, to create a threatening and unsettling impression, while again relying on themselves and their constantly evolving skills. Another factor was the desire to convey an energy similar to that of a live performance, which the band achieved by recording without a metronome, using live drums, high volume amplifiers and feedback on the guitar.

Með hamri was released on 16 December 2022 via Norma Evangelium Diaboli. The cover art for the album was designed by Manuel Tinnemans, who had already collaborated with the band on the previous album. The idea was to be "majestic and unfriendly at the same time," D.G. explained in an interview with The Reykjavík Grapevine. The band embarked on a European tour in January 2023 to support the album.

== Critical reception ==
Professional ratings
Review scores
Source	Rating
Metal.de	9/10 stars
Sputnikmusic	4/5 stars

Með hamri received positive reviews from music critics. In a review for metal.de, Angela wrote that Misþyrming "constantly break up their tracks, putting individual instruments in the foreground and, alongside the dominant roughness and coldness, create desperate ('Með harmi'), dramatic ('Blóðhefnd') and unexpectedly emotional ('Engin vorkunn') moments, while the dense sound and the multi-layered and detailed compositions support the impressive melodies." However, she felt that the album could have done without the interludes, which she said were "filler at best and annoying at worst, like at the end of 'Engin Miskunn'". Metal Storm reviewer RaduP wrote that Með hamri is more dissonant and caustic than Algleymi and more melodic and triumphant than Söngvar elds og óreiðu, and also singled out the work of the band's new drummer, who makes the album sound "alive". Sunnyvale of Sputnikmusic noted that "Misþyrming's greatest strength throughout their existence has been the seamless fusion of old and new in black metal, and this continues on Með hamri: the melodies are raw and fiery, but at the same time combine melody and dissonance that are reminiscent of more recent trends in metal."

== Track listing ==
No.	Title	Length
1.	"Með hamri"	06:27
2.	"Með harmi"	08:10
3.	"Engin miskunn"	08:20
4.	"Engin vorkunn"	07:12
5.	"Blóðhefnd"	03:29
6.	"Aftaka"	09:52
Total length:		43:31

== Personnel ==
- D.G. (Dagur Gíslason) – guitar, lead vocals, keyboards
- T.Í. (Tómas Ísdal) – guitar, backing vocals
- G.E. (Gústaf Evensen) – bass, backing vocals
- M.S. (Magnús Skúlason) – drums
