= 13 Hours =

13 Hours may refer to:

- 13 Hours (book), full title 13 Hours: The Inside Account of What Really Happened in Benghazi, a 2014 historical book by American author Mitchell Zuckoff made into a film
  - 13 Hours: The Secret Soldiers of Benghazi, also known as 13 Hours, a 2016 film based on the book
- 13Hrs, 2010 British film

== See also ==
- 13 Hours by Air, a 1936 film
- "13 Hours in Islamabad", episode of Homeland
- Hour of 13, an American doom metal band
- The Hour of 13, a 1952 British film directed by Harold French
