= Virus West =

Album by Nagelfar

Studio album by Nagelfar
- Released: 2001
- Recorded: June 2000
- Genre: Black metal
- Label: Ars Metalli

Nagelfar chronology
Srontgorrth (1999)	Virus West (2001)

Professional ratings
Review scores
Source	Rating
Kerrang!	3/5 stars

Virus West is German black metal band Nagelfar's third and last album before they broke up. The album was recorded in June 2000 in Andy Classen's Stage-One-Studio. The track "Hellebarn" contains a sample from the 1982 film The Thing.

== Cover art ==
The album's cover displays the Westwall, which, according to drummer Alexander von Meilenwald, is not supposed to be interpreted politically but "is the dark side of the Western German landscape and supposed to support the musical scenario. 'Virus West' is a pathogen coming from the west—that's us."

== Sound ==
Virus West is more inspired by traditional black metal than the first two albums, except the production. Meilenwald "think[s] 'Virus West' already indicated that Nagelfar were departing from the shores of all-too dreamy, melodic and 'beautiful' Black Metal. The development to the point of founding The Ruins of Beverast merely strengthened me in my decision to create music of immense gloom and trepidation, surreal and dark."

== Reception ==
Virus West was featured on Rock Hard magazine's list 250 Black-Metal-Alben, die man kennen sollte ('250 black metal albums you should know').

== Track listing ==
1. "Hellebarn" (Hellchild) – 10:23
2. "Sturm der Katharsis" (Storm of Catharsis) – 8:43
3. "Hetzjagd in Palästina" (Manhunt in Palestine) – 11:54
4. "Westwall" (Western Wall) – 1:57
5. "Fäden des Schicksals" (Threads of Fate) – 6:58
6. "Protokoll einer Folter" (Protocol of a Torture) – 10:28
7. "Meuterei" (Mutiny) – 11:38
