= Path of Samsara =

German rock band

Path of Samsara is a German rock band from Freising. They released two albums, the latter on Ván Records.

In 2010, the band dropped their Demo 2010. It was made fully available for downloading. Nonetheless, and despite only containing two songs, it was also reviewed by some outlets. Powermetal.de gave it 8 out of 10 points as a "highly interesting" demo with "a lot of ideas" that were executed well. The music was described as 1970s rock with metal influences, a bit "far-out". Both Powermetal.de and DPRP denied the band being prog rock. DPRP saw Path of Samsara as "stoner/post rock album with some metal influences [...] and some psychedelic jamming".

The group's debut album came out in October the same year. Self-titled and self-released, it received good review scores of 7 out of 10 from Metal.de and 7.5 from Powermetal.de. It was said to be a remarkable and rewarding debut album; having its somewhat weak points, especially regarding the vocals, the music was energetic and dynamic. With the sound being mainly rooted in the 1970s, other influences were "woven together into a homogeneous blend". Added Vampster, "What's particularly remarkable is how well-thought-out and mature "Path Of Samsara" sounds for a debut album. The mostly expansive songs are peppered with subtle details, hidden keyboard lines, and captivating arrangements".

Unusually for a promo release, Promo 2012 was also taken up for review, receiving 8 points from Metal.de. "Please, please, more of this!" interjected the reviewer.

Black Lotos in December 2012 was also well received in German outlets. Metal.de hightened their rating to 8 and Powermetal.de to 8.5. Their songs could be several minutes long and "hypnotically meditative", but also "rock hard and with real punch". The latter added that Path of Samsara had "broken free from psychedelic and stoner rock clichés". Vampster was also impressed with the steps taken since the debut release. While there was "still room for improvement", "the collective grows closer together, simultaneously erecting its altar with stoic calm and determination".

In 2015, their second full-length The Fiery Hand followed. Norway's Scream Magazine expressed delight with the "retro-oriented rock" and shoegaze output. The trio jumped between genres and the music was "as versatile as it is catchy" . The band was approaching "the elite of occult rock" with this release, which was rated 5 out of 6. Rock Hard gave a similar score, 8 out of 10, as did Metal.de while Powermetal.de stuck to 8.5.
