= Algleymi =

Studio album by Misþyrming
- Released: 24 May 2019
- Recorded: 2017–2018
- Studio: Gryfjan
- Genre: Black metal
- Length: 46:18
- Language: Icelandic
- Label: Norma Evangelium Diaboli

Misþyrming chronology
Hof (2017)	Algleymi (2019)	Með hamri (2022)

Algleymi is the second studio album by Icelandic black metal band Misþyrming, released on 24 May 2019 by Norma Evangelium Diaboli. It is the first studio album to feature guitarist T.Í., bassist G.E., and the last to feature H.R.H. on drums.

== Background and recording ==
According to D.G., he wrote the music in 2015 after the release of the band's debut and started recording it in 2016. However, due to production and mixing errors caused by cheap equipment, the album was delayed and entirely rerecorded from scratch, after finishing the final mix in early 2017 and realizing how critical the mistakes are. The band continued touring in spite of this and even played some of the new songs in concerts throughout 2016, 2017 and 2018. In 2017 after extensive rehearsal of the material the band secured a professional studio to record a new version of the album which was done between autumn 2017 and 2018 and featured guest vocals by Sturla Viðar of Svartidauði and Wraath of Behexen, as well as the second lyrical contribution from poet and musician Kristófer Páll for one of the songs.

The use of keyboards increased compared to the previous album. According to D.G., Algleymi had been conceived as a grandiose, spectacular album with a clear sound. On 27 April 2019, the band announced their long-awaited sophomore album would be titled Algleymi and was released on May 24 through Norma Evangelium Diaboli.

== Themes ==
According to D.G., Algleymi depicts company scared by a mischievous way. The motifs of the songs include human dependence on enjoyment and substances, superior strength and malignant effects of the same, as well as the inhospitable of their native island (and its metaphorical relation to the Icelandic nation). The album name itself means oblivion.

== Critical reception ==
Professional ratings
Review scores
Source	Rating
Laut.de	5/5 stars
Metal.de	9/10 stars
Sputnikmusic	4.5/5 stars

The album received critical acclaim from musical critics. Alex Klug from Laut.de described the album as “the eruption of the volcano laid to music”. Jan Vishkovsky of Metal.de wrote that Misþyrming easily met all expectations and even surprised. The brilliant continuation of the debut album. Algleymi was ranked 29th place in the list of “40 best metal albums of 2019” according to Decibel magazine.

== Track listing ==
No.	Title	Length
1.	"Orgia"	5:27
2.	"Með svipur á lofti"	7:05
3.	"Ísland, steingelda krummaskuð"	6:25
4.	"Hælið"	2:32
5.	"Og er haustið líður undir lok"	4:41
6.	"Allt sem eitt sinn blómstraði"	6:57
7.	"Alsæla"	6:05
8.	"Algleymi"	7:04
Total length:		46:16

== Personnel ==
- D.G. (Dagur Gíslason) – guitar, lead vocals, keyboards
- T.Í. (Tómas Ísdal) – guitar, backing vocals
- G.E. (Gústaf Evensen) – bass, backing vocals
- H.R.H. (Helgi Rafn Hróðmarsson) – drums
