= Atlantean Kodex =

German heavy metal band

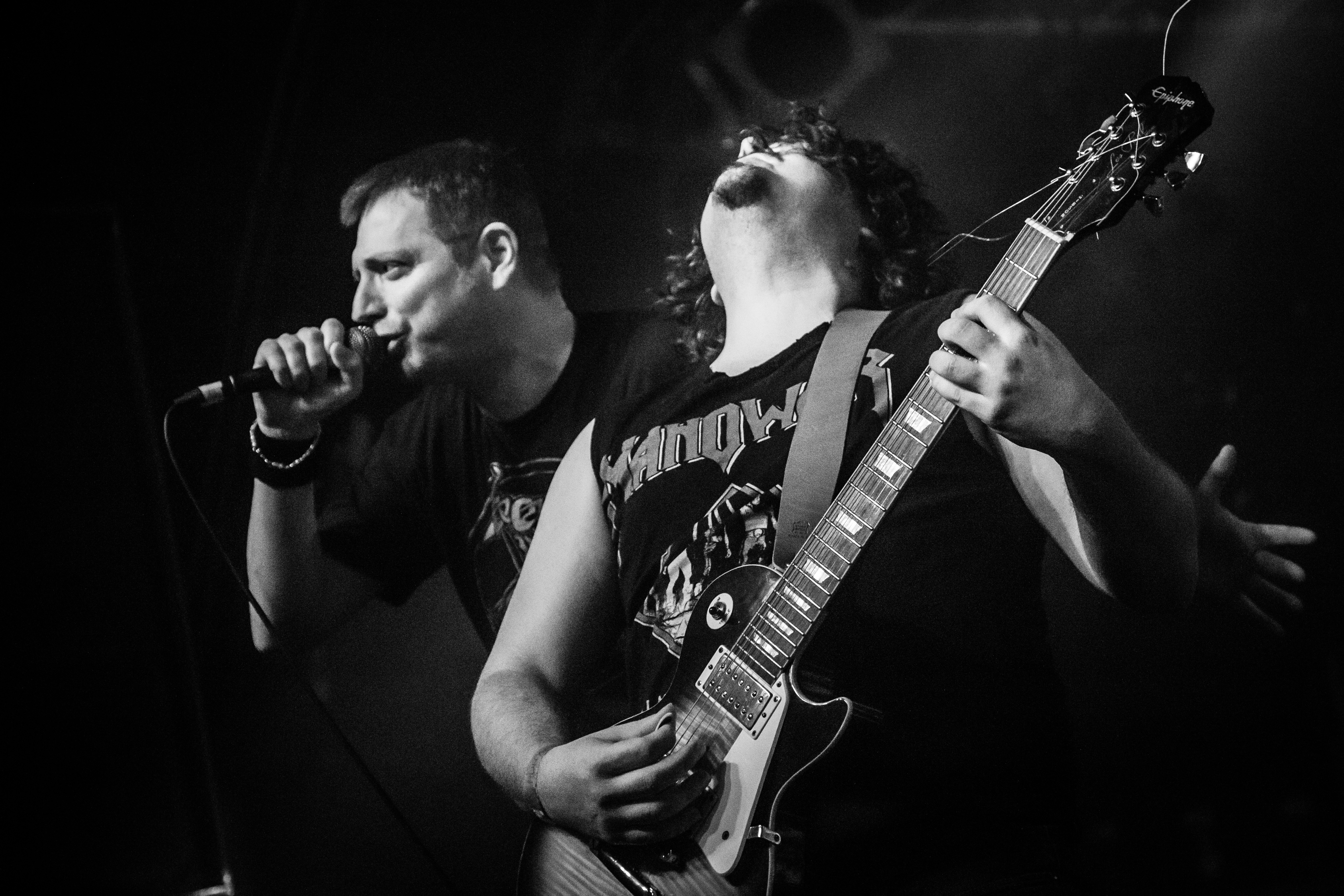
- Atlantean Kodex at Hell over Hammaburg festival 2018

Background information
- Origin: Vilseck, Bavaria, Germany
- Genres: Heavy metal; epic doom metal
- Years active: 2005–present
- Labels: Ván Records
- Members: Manuel Trummer; Florian Kreuzer; Markus Becker; Mario Weiß; Coralie Baier
- Past members: Michael Koch

Atlantean Kodex is a German heavy metal band from Vilseck in Bavaria. The band is under contract with Ván Records and has released three studio albums so far.

== History ==
=== Early years (2005–2010) ===
The band was founded in 2005 by Manuel Trummer (guitar) and Florian Kreuzer (bass). The further members Markus Becker (vocals), Michael Koch (guitar) and Mario White (drums) joined two years later. In 2007, they released the demo The Pnakotic Demos, followed by the EPs A Prophet in the Forest and The Pnakotic Vinyls two years later. The band has performed at renowned underground festivals, including the 2009 Keep It True, the Hammer of Doom, the Up the Hammers in Athens, the Dublin Doom Day and the Doom Metal Inquisition in Bradford.

=== The Golden Bough and The White Goddess (2010–present) ===
Atlantean Kodex signed to the Italian label Cruz del Sur Music. In 2010, the debut album The Golden Bough was released. The title comes from the book The Golden Bough of the Scottish anthropologist James George Frazer, who believed that all European religions evolved from the magical thinking of the Stone Age people. He considered magic to be the root of religions.

The album became album of the month in the magazine Rock Hard, as well as in the Heavy oder was? magazine and in the Greek Metal Hammer. In the annual polls of the online communities of Sacred Metal and Rock Hard, The Golden Bough won in the category "Album of the Year". In 2011, Atlantean Kodex played at the Rock Hard Festival, in 2012 they were confirmed for the Bang Your Head!!! festival, but had to cancel their performance; however, in 2014 they played the festival.

The second album The White Goddess was published on 4 October 2013 and received positive reviews again in the press. It entered the German charts at number 65.

== Musical style ==
Atlantean Kodex was founded by Manuel Trummer to create an alternative to modern metal. Key influences were old Manowar and Bathory. The band plays epic heavy metal based on doom metal, which was described as a mixture of Candlemass and Solitude Aeturnus with Manowar, Iced Earth, Bathory or Solstice. Another influence is the hard rock of the 1970s, like Uriah Heep or Rainbow.

For the lyrics Trummer was inspired by ancient European mythology, writers such as H.P. Lovecraft, Robert E. Howard or Carl Amery as well as Bavarian culture. The musicians are considered to be advocates of analog recording techniques and have spoken out repeatedly in interviews accordingly.

== Discography ==
=== Studio albums ===
- 2010: The Golden Bough
- 2013: The White Goddess
- 2019: The Course of Empire

=== EPs ===
- 2008: A Prophet in the Forest
- 2009: The Pnakotic Vinyls

=== Other ===
- 2006: The Hidden Folk (split with Vestal Claret)
- 2007: The Pnakotic Demos (demo)
- 2009: The Annihilation of Königshofen (live)
- 2010: The Pnakotic Demos + Fragments of Yuggoth
- 2010: The Annihilation of Nürnberg (live)
- 2017: The Annihilation of Bavaria (live)
- 2020: The Annihilation of Tyrol (live)
- 2021: The Annihilation of Vienna (live)
