= Year of the Goat (band) =

Swedish occult rock band

- Origin: Norrköping, Sweden
- Genres: Hard rock, Doom Metal, Progressive Rock, Occult rock
- Years active: 2006-present
- Labels: Napalm Records, Ván Records
- Members: Thomas Sabbathi Eriksson; Mikael Mihailo "Pope" Popovic; Jonas Erik Waldhuber Mattsson; David Håkan Andreas Olofsson; Daniel Melo Ortega; Marko Kardum; Elin Gårdfalk
- Website: https://yearofthegoat.bandcamp.com/

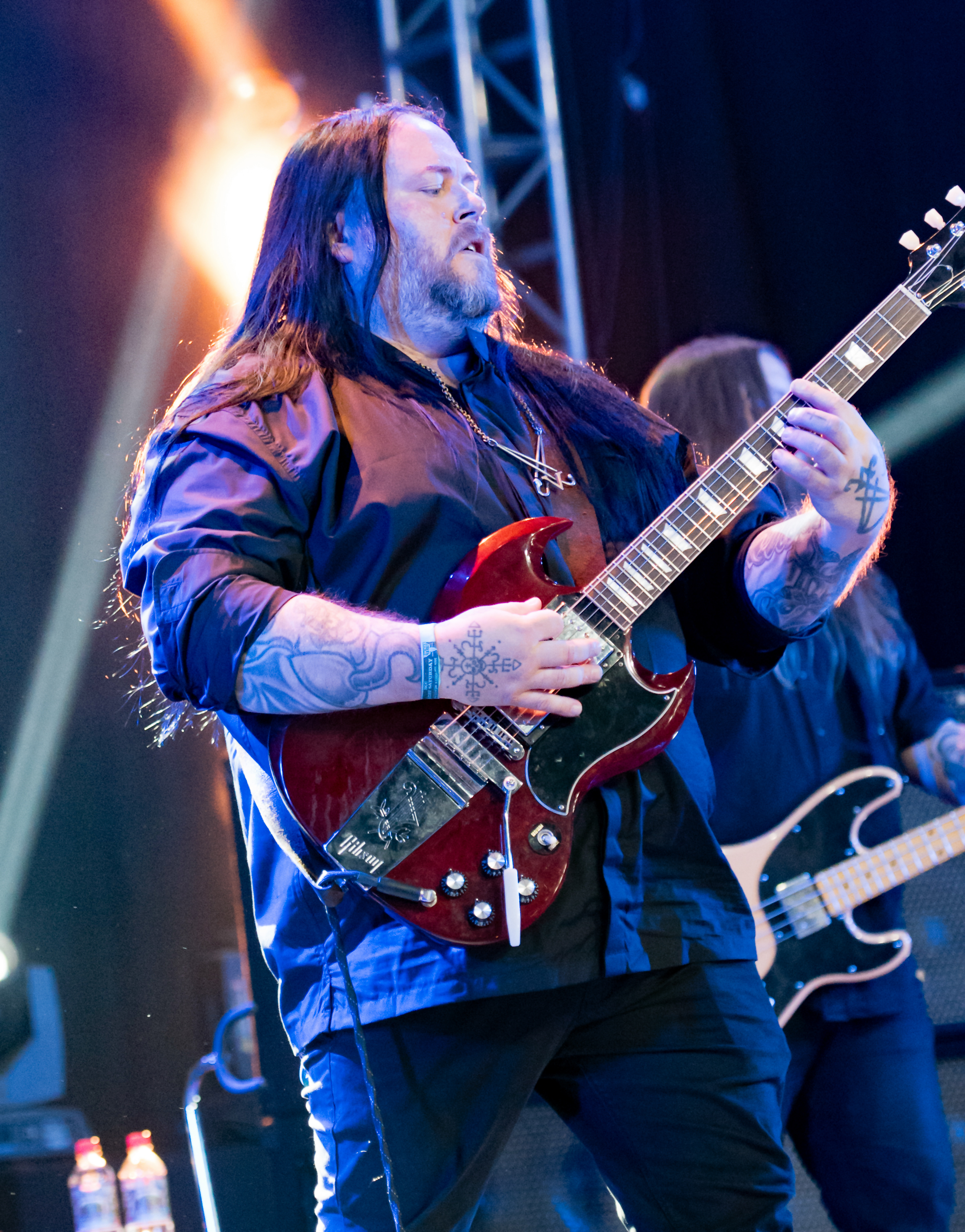
Year of the Goat at Wacken Open Air festival in 2016

Year of the Goat is a Swedish occult rock band formed in Norrköping, Sweden in the late 2000s. The group combines elements of hard rock, psychedelic, doom and proto-metal with esoteric lyrical themes.

== History ==
Year of the Goat was founded around 2006 by Thomas Sabbathi (vocals, guitar). The band released their debut EP Lucem Ferre in 2011 on Ván Records.

Their first full-length album, Angels’ Necropolis, followed in 2012. Subsequent albums included The Unspeakable (2015) and Novis Orbis Terrarum Ordinis (2019).

In 2024 they contributed to the soundtrack of the finnish movie Heavier Trip.

In July 2025, the band published their released on 12 September 2025 through Napalm Records.

== Musical style and themes ==
The band’s music is often described as occult rock or dark rock, drawing heavily on 1960s–70s hard rock and proto-metal influences. Critics have compared them to Blue Öyster Cult, Black Sabbath, Ghost, and The Devil's Blood. Their lyrics frequently reference mysticism, esotericism, and occult themes. The Unspeakable is centered around the works of H.P. Lovecraft. Novis Orbis Terrarum Ordinis is structured conceptually around the seven deadly sins., imagining a second coming of Jesus, if Jesus embraced each deadly sin.

The album Trivia Goddess is a collection of female figures, both historical and mythological, from Eve and the Goddess Hecate, to the Salem Witch Trials, and even the 1977 horror film, Alucarda.

Instrumentation often features Hammond organ, Mellotron, dramatic vocal arrangements, and a mixture of soft passages with heavier riffs.

== Band members ==
=== Current members ===
- Thomas Sabbathi – vocals, guitars
- Mikael “Pope” Popovic – vocals, keyboards, acoustic guitar
- Jonas Waldhuber Mattsson – guitars, backing vocals
- David Olofsson – guitars
- Daniel Melo Ortega – drums
- Marko Kardum – bass
- Elin Gårdfalk – backing vocals

=== Past members ===
- Marcus Lundberg - guitars
- Don Palmroos - guitars
- Tobias Resch - bass

== Discography ==
=== Studio albums ===
- Angels’ Necropolis (2012, Ván Records / Napalm Records)
- The Unspeakable (2015, Napalm Records)
- Novis Orbis Terrarum Ordinis (2019, Napalm Records)
- Trivia Goddess (2025, Napalm Records)

=== Other releases ===
- Lucem Ferre (EP, 2011)
- The Key and the Gate (single, 2014)
- Alucarda (single, 2025)

== Reception ==
Year of the Goat have been well received in occult rock and heavy rock circles. Novis Orbis Terrarum Ordinis in particular was praised for its ambitious concept and mixture of heaviness with melodic elements. WDR Rockpalast described them as a "secret tip" within the heavy rock and metal scene.

== See also ==
- Occult rock
- Ghost (Swedish band)
- The Devil's Blood

== Extern Links ==
- Year of the Goat at Bandcamp
- Year of the Goat discography at Discogs
