= Revelations of the Red Sword =

Studio album by Svartidauði
- Released: 3 December 2018
- Studio: Studio Emissary; Reykjavík, Iceland
- Genre: Black metal
- Length: 47:32
- Label: Ván Records
- Producer: Stephen Lockhart

Svartidauði chronology
Untitled (2017)	Revelations of the Red Sword (2018)

Singles from Revelations of the Red Sword
- 1. "Burning Worlds of Excrement" Released: 15 October 2018; 2. "Wolves of a Red Sun" Released: 2 November 2018

Revelations of the Red Sword is the second and final studio album by Icelandic black metal band Svartidauði, released on 3 December 2018 via Ván Records. The album received positive reviews from critics.

== Background ==
The album's title was taken from the Manifesto of Futurism by Italian poet Filippo Tommaso Marinetti. Revelations of the Red Sword was recorded at Emissary Studios in Reykjavík with producer Stephen Lockhart. The album took four days to record, with bass and drums recorded in one night, guitars in two days, and vocals in two half-day sessions. The cover art was designed by David Glomba. The album was recorded with the support of the Icelandic Centre for Research.

The first single, "Burning Worlds of Excrement", was released on 15 October 2018. The second single, "Wolves of a Red Sun", was released on 2 November 2018.

== Critical reception ==
Professional ratings
Review scores
Source	Rating
metal.de	8/10 stars
Metal Storm	N/A
Rock Hard	9/10 stars

The album received positive reviews from critics. Alexander Santel from metal.de rated the album 8 out of 10 and wrote that Svartidauði "create something inexplicable and mesmerizing." A reviewer for Metal Storm did not rate the album, but noted that the songs had more melody without sacrificing the "nasty and dissonant chaos", and also wrote that "Svartidauði are trying to explore new ground and develop their sound rather than recreate their moment of greatest glory, with something less esoteric and more melodic, but still extremely chaotic and dynamic." Rock Hard magazine editor Mandy Melon rated the album 9 out of 10, saying that "songs like 'The Howling Cynocephali' send shivers down your spine from the very first second, because the music is so dynamic that the guitars swirl through the darkest realms and take you to worlds that lie between the cold end of time and melancholic beauty," while "other tracks like 'Reveries Of Conflagration', after a shamanic sound and a lingering melodic pause, build to a wrenching crescendo by the end that leaves an intoxicating effect."

== Track listing ==
No.	Title	Length
1.	"Sol Ascending"	7:07
2.	"Burning Worlds of Excrement"	5:26
3.	"The Howling Cynocephali"	7:44
4.	"Wolves of a Red Sun"	5:36
5.	"Reveries of Conflagration"	9:50
6.	"Aureum Lux"	11:49
Total length:		47:32

== Personnel ==
Adapted from Bandcamp and the Revelations of the Red Sword liner notes:

Svartidauði

- Sturla Viðar Jacobsson – bass guitar, vocals
- Þórir Garðarsson – guitar
- Magnús Skúlason – drums, backing vocals

Additional musicians

- Edda Gvüdmundsdóttir – choir
- Stephen Lockhart – choir

Additional personnel

- Stephen Lockhart – production
- David Glomba – cover art
