= Škan =

- Origin: Austin, Texas, United States
- Genres: Blackened death metal, extreme metal
- Years active: 2011–present
- Label: Ván Records
- Members: Joseph Merino; Ron van Herpen; Rob Zim; David Baxter
- Website: wolvesofskan.bandcamp.com

Škan is an American extreme metal band formed in 2013.

== Biography ==
Škan began as the solo studio project of Joseph Merino on November 11 of 2011. On November 2 of 2013, Škan was formed as a live entity. Škan's self released an EP, entitled "The Old King”, on the 11th of November 2013, which quickly gained a loyal following and praise from many supporters across the world who appreciated the uncompromising sound and vision. Featuring in many online press reviews the EP was well received with standout tracks like “The Eye" that lead to Škan's live assaults, proving Škan as a formidable entity among long standing metal titans. In the months that followed Škan unleashed it's ritualistic live shows alongside international acts like Danzig, Voivod, Portal, Moonspell, Saturnalia Temple, Cult of Fire, and many more in the U.S. as well as the U.K.

In 2015 Ron Van Herpen (ZooN / Astrosoniq / The Devil's Blood) and Rob Zim (The Lords of Altamont) entered Škan, soon after which EP I and II of a four EP set were released by Ván Records as a limited edition series which is to be followed up by the release of EP's III and IV, as well as a full-length debut album.

Endorsements:

• Seymour Duncan • Randall Amplifiers • Dream Cymbals

== Current members ==
- Joseph Merino: Guitars, Vocals
- Ron van Herpen: Guitars
- Rob Zim: Bass
- David Baxter: Drums, Percussions

== Discography ==
Studio albums

- The Old King (EP) (© DEATH CROWN 2013)
- PART I of IV (Ván Records March 11, 2016)
- Part II of IV (Ván Records March 11, 2016)

== Cultural references ==
The name Škan (see Skan) originates from the Lakota language.
