= Bölzer =

Swiss extreme metal band

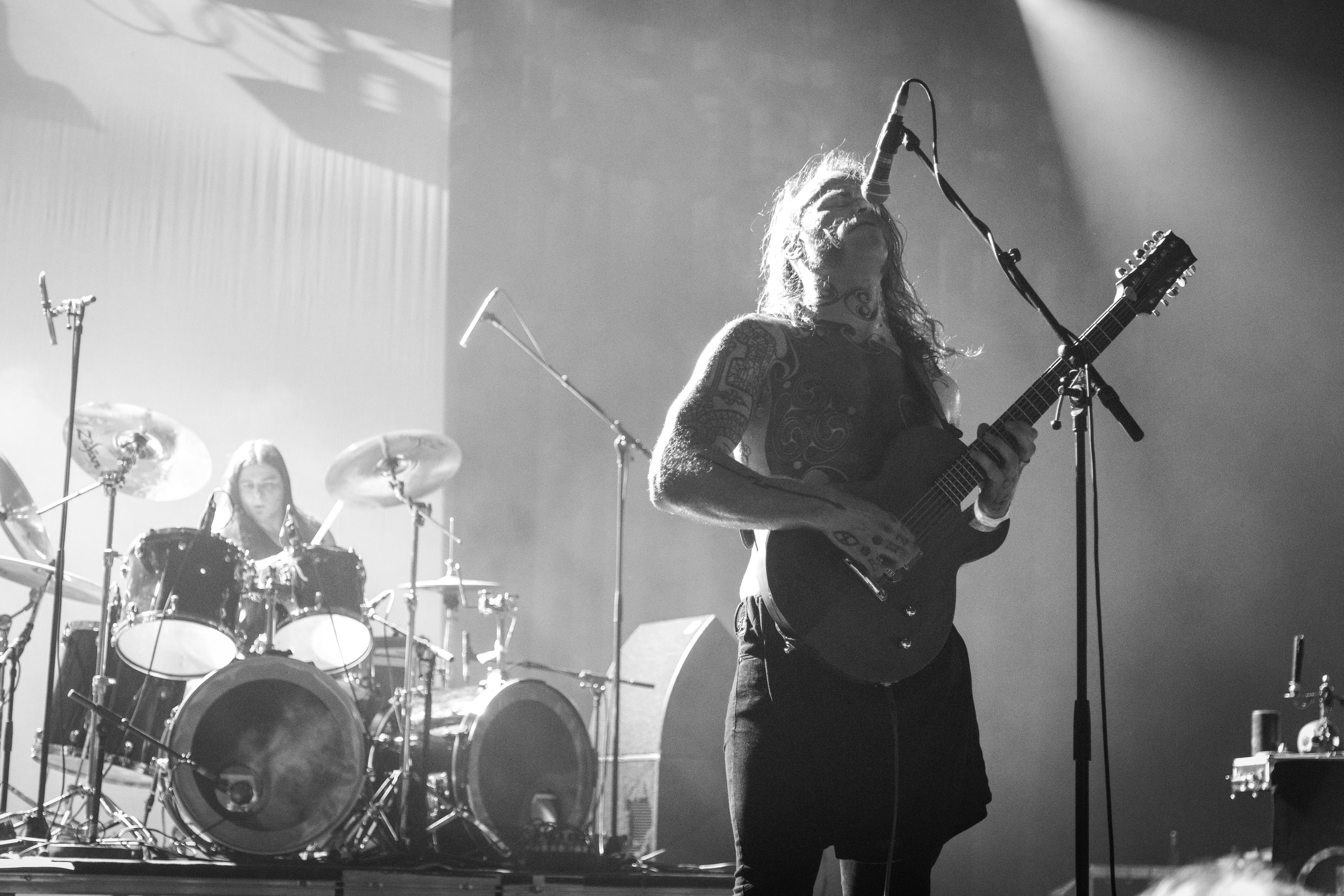

Background information
- Origin: Zürich, Switzerland
- Genres: Blackened death metal
- Years active: 2008–present
- Labels: Iron Bonehead Productions; Invictus Productions; Lightning & Sons
- Members: Okoi Thierry Jones; Fabian Wyrsch
- Website: www.bolzer.ch

Bölzer is a Swiss extreme metal band formed in Zürich in 2008. To date, they have released three EPs and one studio album, Hero, on Iron Bonehead Productions.

The band's 2013 EP Aura generated substantial acclaim from music critics and metal fans. It has been frequently described as one of the best metal releases of 2013 by sites such as NPR Music and Stereogum, despite its brief length. NPR have described the band as "one of 2014's biggest extreme metal success stories".

== History ==
Though the band was formed in 2008 by Okoi Jones and Fabian Wyrsch, they did not release their first EP Roman Acupuncture until 17 October 2012. According to the musicians, the name Bölzer means "a powerful force or blow or strike that has no regard for the consequences or the repercussions. And in that sense it's not directed either, it's just a chaotic strike of energy…. a force of chaos, and a force of life and death and anything." They released their second EP Aura on 13 May 2013 on Iron Bonehead Productions. Aura generated substantial critical acclaim from music critics and metal fans, with Stereogum later writing that "the hype around them has been rising to alarming heights". The EP has been roundly praised as one of the best metal releases of 2013 and "a breath of fresh air", and its success landed the band spots at major music festivals around the world. Stereogum named it the 12th best metal of 2013, writing that "Listening to Aura is like entering a warped atmosphere, a drunken look through a kaleidoscope with a blast beat foundation. "Entranced By The Wolfshook" anchors the three-track EP, an all-too-short introduction to a band that has great things ahead".

Bölzer released their third EP Soma on 11 August 2014 on Invictus Productions. Soma likewise received very positive reviews from music critics. The Quietus described the album as the "side B to Aura's side A" and wrote that "The way in which the band bludgeon brutally and then return to the shadows with ease of transition is something that takes time to master. Yet even though the band has only released a handful of songs at this point in time, we've now come to expect this kind of instantaneous tension and release mastery from Bölzer." Later that year the band performed at Maryland Deathfest, their first show in the United States, and later toured Latin America with Grave Miasma.

In May 2016 it was confirmed that the band had entered the studio to record their debut full-length album Hero, to be released on Iron Bonehead and Invictus Productions later in 2016. On 12 September the band began streaming the song "I Am III" from the album, confirming that the album is due to be released on 25 November 2016. On 24 October, the band began streaming a second track from the album titled "Spiritual Athleticism". Hero was officially released on 25 November 2016 to generally positive reviews from music critics.

Bölzer contributed a previously unreleased track titled 'Born. Led. God. Death.' to the C.H.A.O.S. Split album released on 20 July 2017 through Art of Propaganda. The album was dedicated to the memory of their recently deceased friend and fellow Swiss metal musician Domi Keller. The track was originally written and recorded during the Soma recording sessions in 2013, but was not released until this split album. The band toured the west coast of the United States in 2017, then commenced the Continental Crucifixion tour across Europe in September with Svartidauði, Archgoat, and Eggs of Gomorrh.

== Musical style, influences and live shows ==
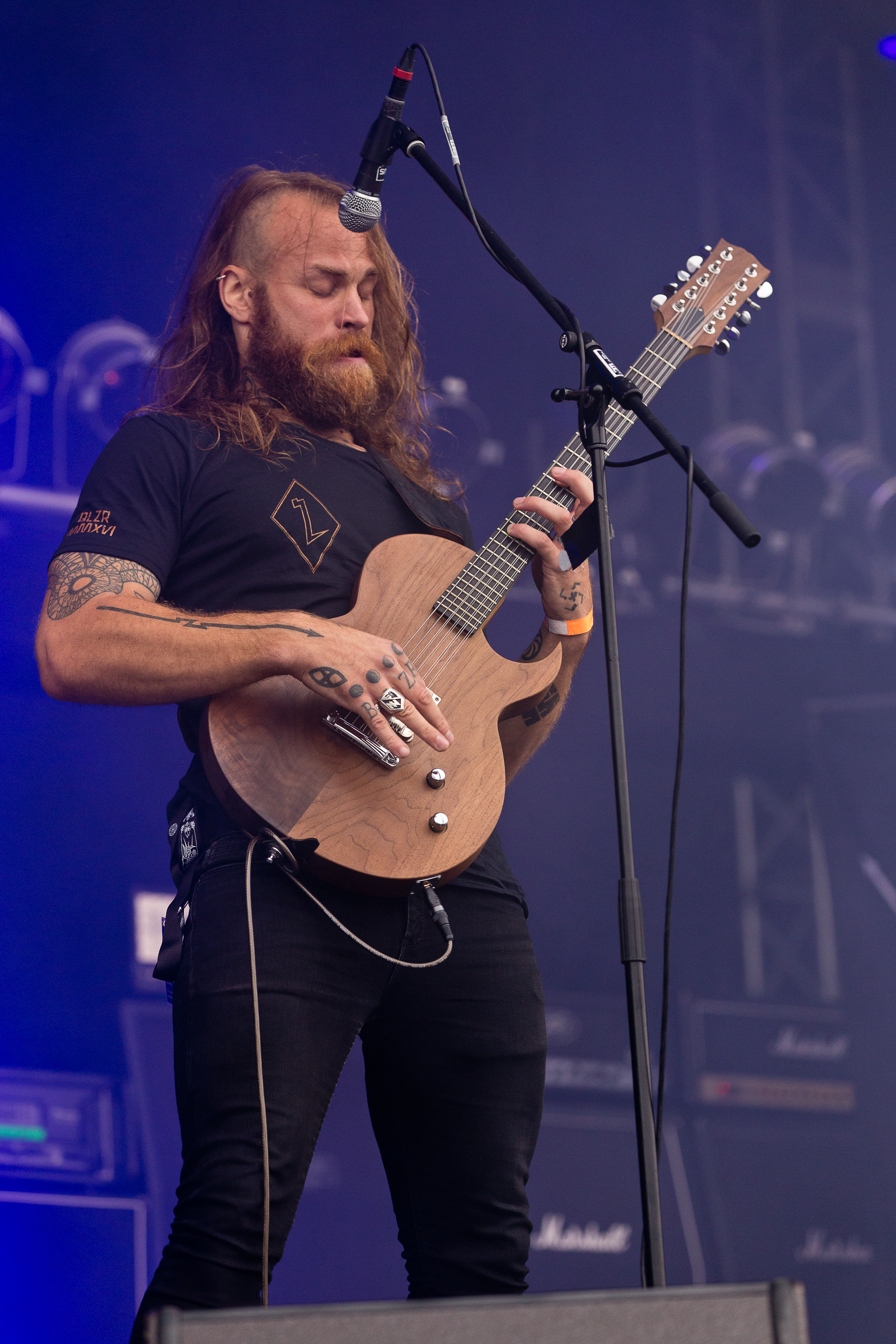
Okoi Thierry Jones 2016 at Party.San

Though the band's style can be broadly categorized as blending elements of death metal or black metal, critics have noted the band's unconventional approach to these genres. In a review of their 2013 EP Aura, Sputnikmusic wrote that the band are extending the genre's boundaries, and described the band as "an adventurous extreme metal hybrid" that is "filtered through a veil of demented/majestic psychedelia, early '90s, muddy blast-beat death/black metal succeeds and it's succeeded by abysmal doom metal passages." NPR Music compared the EP to Celtic Frost and Incantation, "fuelled by scrolls of complex riffs and drawn to doom." Stereogum write that the band "draws from a different palette than most, with songs that buzz with otherwordly [sic] weirdness at much as they rip, thanks in large part to a warbling guitar tone and keyboards that push out big atonal and symphonic blasts". Lyrically the band draw on mythological themes, ancient cultures, folklore, Nietzsche, and paganism. Okoi Jones has cited psychedelics as an influence on the band's music, and described the band's philosophy as "all about getting out what we're feeling. There's no conformity involved as far as genres—black metal, death metal, whatever. I just write riffs that feel right to me. They're usually based around atmosphere and power. The songs definitely have to move me. If the riff isn't doing that, if it's not giving me goose bumps, I'm not gonna use it. The goal is elevation—bodily and spiritual elevation."

The band have gained a reputation for their powerful live performances with just the two band members. Stereogum writer Michael Nelson wrote that "the No. 1 question of Maryland Deathfest 2014 was whether you were going to see the young Swiss duo Bölzer." He described the band's performance at Maryland Deathfest as his favourite moment of the festival, writing that they played "the two most exciting sets at MDF, managing to fill Ram's Head on both Friday and Saturday despite the otherwise-unmissable alternatives over at Edison Lot." Metal Hammer gave their performance in London in 2015 a 9/10 rating, calling the band as "a prime example of hype being justified." They went on to write that "The two-piece may have less than an hour of recorded music available, but they can put on show that the best metal bands around would struggle to match – no mean feat given the simplicity of the visual performance. KzR adopts the Lemmy pose at the front of the stage and simply plays, while HzR hides in the dark behind his kit and whacks out thunder. And yet it's riveting, and allows the vicious riffing to command full attention, the band's distinct personality coming across with ease. It's frightening to think how brilliant they might be with more songs available."

== Controversy ==
Some of frontman Okoi Jones's tattoos have caused controversy, as among them are a stylized swastika and sun cross. Jones explained:

My sunwheels, my swastikas, my whatever you call them, it's an ancient symbol used by basically every culture on this planet at some time or another for more or less the same reason, to express their adoration for the sun, the solar power [...] Its right or left form reversed is a lunar symbol, too, and it's a female as well as a male symbol; it represents a lot of different energies. It's a continuum, it can be a destructive force, it takes a lot of natural philosophies into one. If you read about it, it's really fascinating. [...] We promote the growth and enlightenment of the individual, the last thing on our agenda would be to glorify the implements of power involved in the collective enslavement of a people and their individualism. Fascism and racism in that sense are pretty unattractive for us.

Jones said the band "have nothing to do with politics" and refuted claims that his tattoos stand for "racist ideals", saying "I have African roots, my name is African, my father is half African".

== Lineup ==
- KzR (Okoi Thierry Jones) – vocals, guitar (2008-)
- HzR (Fabian Wyrsch) – drums (2008-)

== Discography ==
Albums

- Hero (2016)

EPs

- Roman Acupuncture (2012)
- Aura (2013)
- Soma (2014)
- Lese Majesty (2019)
