= Vestal Claret =

- Origin: Connecticut, United States
- Genres: Occult Metal
- Years active: 2006–present
- Label: Cruz Del Sur
- Members: Phil Swanson, Simon Tuozzoli

Vestal Claret is an American occult metal duo based in Connecticut, United States. Formed in 2006 by Phil Swanson (vocals) and Simon Tuozzoli (bass, guitar), the band has released two full-length albums, two EPs, and several splits and demos. Swanson's work with doom projects Hour of 13 and Seamount among others has helped Vestal Claret gain notoriety within the underground metal community.

== History ==
Swanson and Tuozzoli wrote Vestal Claret's demo Two Stones in 2006, while Swanson was working on Upwards of Endtime's second album. The following year, they released a split with another one of Swanson's projects, German doom metal band Atlantean Kodex; the split was well-received and Vestal Claret was offered a recording contract with Sentinel Steel. This offer was later revoked because the music Vestal Claret planned to release was too different than the Two Stones demo material in the opinion of the record label. As a result, Swanson took lyrics he had written to Chad Davis and created Hour of 13's eponymous first album, put out by Shadow Kingdom. Swanson continued to sing for Hour of 13 from 2006–09, 2009–11, and 2011–13.

In between Swanson and Tuozzoli's other musical endeavors, they continued writing Vestal Claret material and releasing it on various underground metal labels. Their first full-length album, Bloodbath, was noted for its traditional doom influences and sophisticated lyrics. This aesthetic continued in 2014's The Cult of Vestal Claret, (Cruz del Sur) a dark composition dealing with topics such as Satanism, sexual abuse, and ritual torture. A music video was released for final track "The Stranger."

Vestal Claret has worked with session drummers Jim Quinn (Upwards of Endtime, Atlantean Kodex), Michael Petrucci (Curse the Son), and Christopher Taylor Beaudette (Nightbitch, Entierro, Kingdom of Sorrow, Jasta live member). Tuozzoli and Swanson are currently writing a third and final Vestal Claret album. Additionally, they plan to release a full-length album of original material and an EP of covers under the band name Bestial Clitoris.

== Discography ==
| Year | Title | Release Type | Label |
|---|---|---|---|
| 2006 | Two Stones | demo | self-released |
| 2007 | Ritual and Rehearsal | demo | self-released |
| 2007 | The Hidden Folk / Two Stones | split w/ Atlantean Kodex | Metal Coven Records |
| 2008 | Worship | EP | Swaying Ball Music |
| 2009 | Lost Loved Ones | EP | NoVisible Scars |
| 2011 | "Virgin Blood" | single | Sarlacc Productions |
| 2011 | Bloodbath | full-length | Cyclopean Productions |
| 2012 | The Kissing Flies / Black Priest | split w/ Albatross | Roadcrew Records |
| 2012 | Vestal Claret / Ungod | split | NoVisible Scars |
| 2013 | Bloodbath | full-length, rereleased | Nine Records |
| 2014 | The Cult of Vestal Claret | full-length | Cruz del Sur Music |
| 2016 | Reborn | cover EP | Nine Records |
| 2020 | Vestal Claret | full-length | |
