= Antlers (band) =

German black metal band

- Also known as: NTLRS
- Origin: Leipzig, Saxony, Germany,
- Genres: Black metal
- Years active: 2013–present
- Labels: Totenmusik, Ván Records
- Website: ntlrs.bandcamp.com

Antlers, sometimes NTLRS, is a German black metal band based in Leipzig, Saxony. The band's songs are noted for being "relentlessly aggressive" but marked especially by attention to melody. Their first album, A Gaze into the Abyss, was released in May 2015. The second album, Beneath. Below. Behold, was released in March 2018.

== Discography ==
=== Albums ===
- A Gaze into the Abyss (2015)
- Beneath. Below. Behold (2018)
