= Flesh Cathedral =

Studio album by Svartidauði
- Released: 3 December 2012
- Recorded: January–February 2011
- Studio: Manus Nigra Studios; Reykjavík, Iceland
- Genre: Black metal
- Length: 56:08
- Label: Terratur Possessions; Daemon Worship Productions
- Producer: Stephen "Wann" Lockhart

Svartidauði chronology
Flesh Cathedral (2012)	The Synthesis of Whore and Beast (2014)

Flesh Cathedral is the debut studio album by Icelandic black metal band Svartidauði, released on 3 December 2012 via Terratur Possessions. The album received positive reviews by the music press, which noted the dark and mysterious atmosphere of the songs. British magazine Kerrang! named Flesh Cathedral one of the greatest black metal albums of the 21st century.

== Background ==
Work on the album began in 2008 and continued until 2011. In early 2011, Svartidauði began recording Flesh Cathedral at Manus Nigra Studios in Reykjavík. It took about 12 days to record all the parts.

== Critical reception ==
The album received positive reviews from professional music critics, although it was noted that Flesh Cathedral received the greatest response from the underground. Wolf-Rüdiger Mühlmann gave the album an 8.5 out of 10 in his review for the German magazine Rock Hard, noting that after Sólstafir's Í Blóði og Anda, Flesh Cathedral is the most notable black metal release from Iceland. MetalSucks editor Grim Kim ranked the album second on his list of "The 15 Best Metal Albums of 2012", praising the creative approach to the songwriting. In 2020, Kerrang! magazine included Flesh Cathedral in its list of "The 13 Greatest Black Metal Albums of the 21st Century". The magazine described the album as "a darkly chaotic, yet surgically precise, abyss" that is also "raw and alluring."

== Track listing ==
No.	Title	Length
1.	"Sterile Seeds"	15:32
2.	"The Perpetual Nothing"	10:34
3.	"Flesh Cathedral"	11:25
4.	"Psychoactive Sacraments"	18:37
Total length:		56:08

== Personnel ==
Svartidauði

- Sturla Viðar – bass guitar, vocals
- Nökkvi Gylfason – guitar
- Þórir Garðarsson – guitar
- Magnús Skúlason – drums, backing vocals

Additional personnel

- Stephen "Wann" Lockhart – production
- Antti Salminen (credited as Babalon Graphics on the album) – cover
