= Misþyrming =

Black-metal band from Reykjavik, Iceland

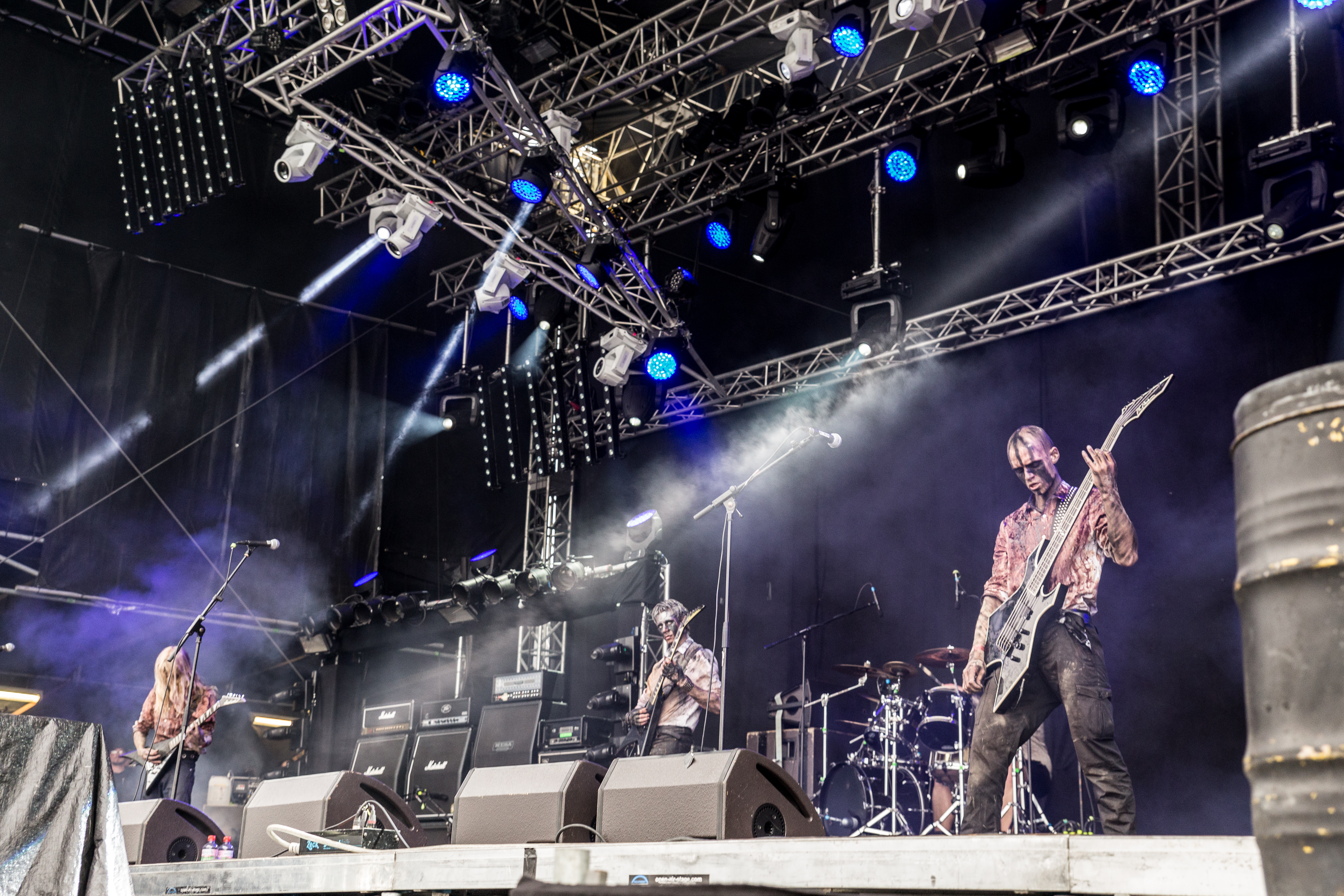
- Misþyrming at the Party.San Metal Open Air 2017

Background information
- Origin: Reykjavík, Iceland
- Genres: Black metal
- Years active: 2013–present
- Labels: Terratur Possessions, Norma Evangelium Diaboli, Fallen Empire Records, Vánagandr
- Members: D.G. T.I. G.E. M.S.
- Past members: H.R.H.

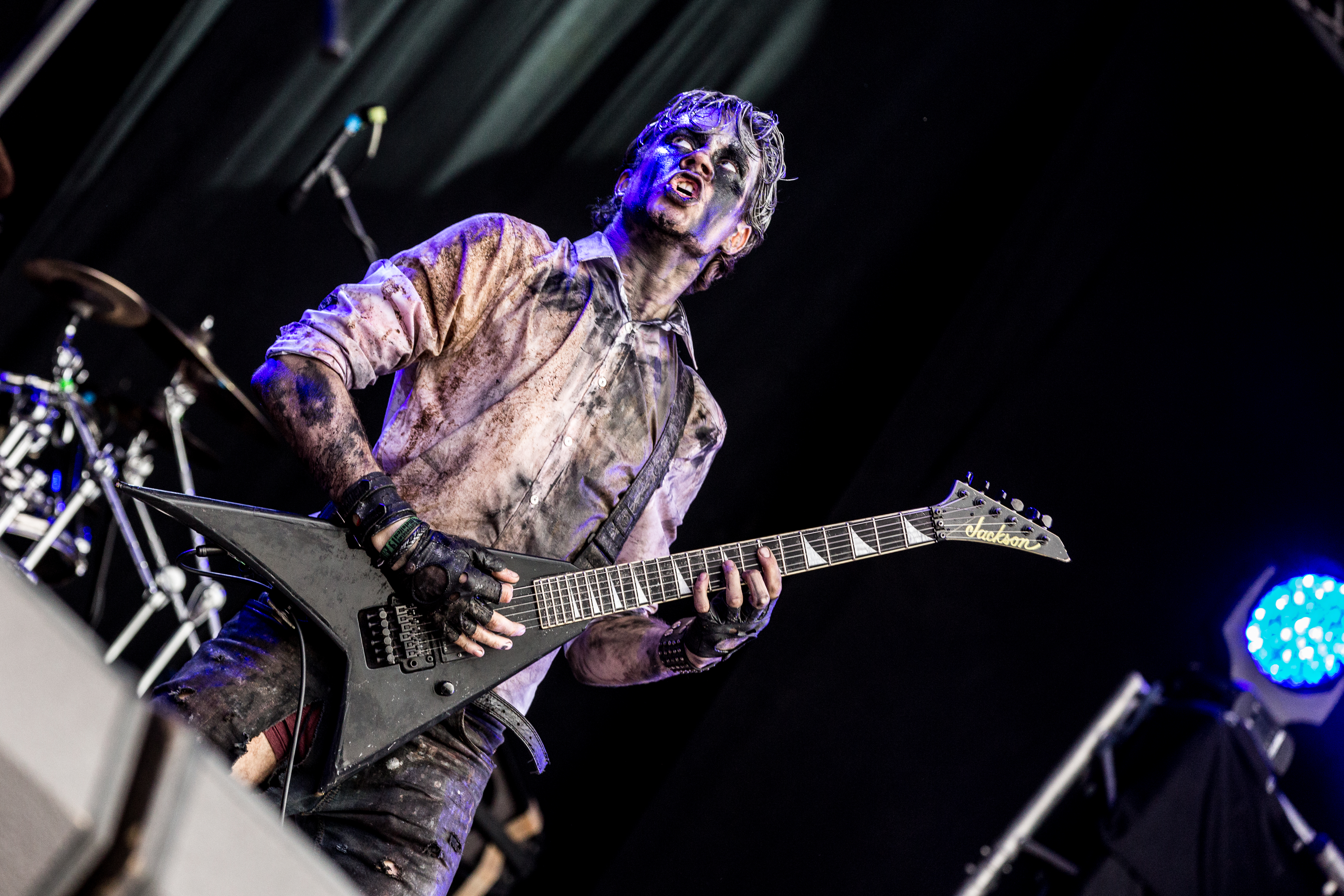
D.G., Party.San 2017

Misþyrming (Icelandic pronunciation: [ˈmɪːsˌθɪrmiŋk]) are a black metal band from Reykjavík, Iceland. The band formed in June 2013 and are currently signed to the French record label Norma Evangelium Diaboli. They released their debut studio album Söngvar elds og óreiðu on 7 February 2015 to widespread critical acclaim. The band have since toured Europe and the United States, performed at Eistnaflug, and were named an 'artist in residence' at the famous Roadburn Festival in 2016.

== History ==
The band started as founding member D.G.'s solo project. Tómas Ísdal, with whom he ran the Vánagandr record label, joined him. He eventually deferred his graduation date in favour of touring with the band, passing his final exams after being tutored by band-mate Helgi.

Their debut studio album Söngvar elds og óreiðu was released on 7 February 2015 to positive reviews from critics, being named one of the best metal albums of 2015 by Stereogum.

Later that year the band performed in Brussels, Belgium at the Nidrosian Black Mass V festival. The band also performed in Norway at Beyond the Gates IV, they were joined by Arioch of Funeral Mist and Marduk fame to perform the Funeral Mist song "The God Supreme".

The band were one of three artists in residence at the famous Roadburn Festival in 2016. In a review of the band's show on April 14 for Invisible Oranges, described the band's performance as "incredible", writing that "These new songs were a swirl of near dissonance, levied by “blink and you’ll miss it” melodies that grounded the listener just long enough to kick the floor out from under them again. It was more head spinning than head banging." Later that year, Metal Hammer named them one of the 10 best Icelandic metal bands.

On January 10, 2017 the band released a split 10" EP with fellow Icelandic band Sinmara, each band contributing one song; Misþyrming's song was titled "Hof" while Sinmara's was titled "Ivory Stone". The EP was released through Terratur Possessions.

On April 27, 2019 the band announced their long-awaited sophomore album would be titled Algleymi and was released on May 24 through Norma Evangelium Diaboli. According to D.G., he wrote the music in 2015 after the release of the band's debut and started recording it in 2016. However, due to production and mixing errors caused by cheap equipment, the album was delayed and entirely rerecorded from scratch, after finishing the final mix in early 2017 and realizing how critical the mistakes are. The band continued touring in spite of this and even played some of the new songs in concents throughout 2016, 2017 and 2018. In 2017 after extensive rehearsal of the material the band secured a professional studio to record a new version of the album which was done between autumn 2017 and 2018 and featured guest vocals by Sturla Viðar of Svartidauði and Wraath of Behexen, as well as the second lyrical contribution from poet and musician Kristófer Páll for one of the songs. Algleymi like its predecessor was very well received by fans and critics alike. The band also announced performances at Ascension Festival in their native Iceland and La Dernière Messe in Switzerland on June as well as headlining a European tour in support of Algleymi with Terratur Possessions label mates Darvaza and French band Vortex of End.

The band continued touring and performing throughout 2019 and had various planned performances for 2020 but due to the COVID-19 pandemic they were forced to reschedule their slots at festivals as well as reschedule their Denmark and Germany mini-tour with fellow Iceland band Naðra and abruptly ended their Eastern Europe tour, but not before the band live streamed their last show in Tallinn, Estonia on March 15, 2020, with the help of the venue's; "Sveta Baar" staff and their touring company Damn Loud.

In late 2021 the band returned to touring and performing at various festivals, with the third leg of their tour in support of Algleymi after many delays. In February 2022 the band announced that had they amicably parted ways with drummer H. R. H., who was later replaced with Magnús Skúlason of Svartidauði. The band continued touring in 2022 and played for the first time in Greece. On October 7, the band announced their third album Með hamri, which was released on December 16 through Norma Evangelium Diaboli.

== Discography ==
- Söngvar elds og óreiðu (2015)
- Ivory Stone / Hof (2017, split with Sinmara)
- Algleymi (2019)
- Með hamri (2022)

== Band members ==
=== Current members ===
- D. G. (Dagur Gíslason) - guitar, lead vocals, keyboards (studio only) (2013–present), bass (studio only) (2013 - 2016)
- T. Í. (Tómas Ísdal) - guitar, backing vocals (2014–present)
- G. E. (Gústaf Evensen) - bass, backing vocals (2014–present)
- M. S. (Magnús Skúlason) - drums (2022–present)

=== Former members ===
- H. R. H. (Helgi Rafn Hróðmarsson) - drums (2013–2022)

=== Live members ===
- Wraath (Björn Holmedahl) - bass (2019)
