= Srontgorrth =

Studio album by Nagelfar
- Released: 1999
- Genre: Black metal
- Label: Kettenhund

Nagelfar chronology
Hünengrab im Herbst (1997)	Srontgorrth (1999)	Virus West (2001)

Srontgorrth: Die Macht erfaßte das meine wie die Angst das Blut der anderen (lit. "Power seized mine [my blood] as fear [seized] the blood of others") is the second studio album by German black metal band Nagelfar, released in 1999.

Srontgorrth is a loose concept album, with the first four tracks focusing on the four seasons. The riff introduced at the beginning of the first piece is reprised at some point in every track on the album. The first three tracks had previously appeared on the band's first two demos and first album, respectively, but were re-recorded for this release. The fourth track is performed featuring no guitars whatsoever.

Most likely because more than half of the songs are re-recordings of previously released material, the band themselves do not consider Srontgorrth as an album, referring instead to their next album, Virus West, as their second album.

== Sound ==
In a 2009 interview, drummer Alexander von Meilenwald wrote that the first Srontgorrth chapter was influenced by Enslaved's "Slaget i skogen bortenfor"; in addition, Nagelfar experimented with industrial elements in this album.

== Lyrics ==
According to Legacy journalist Johannes Paul Köhler, Srontgorrth dealt with the total solar eclipse of 1999, while Meilenwald explained it as the fictional story of an individual freed from the prison of the unconscious and striving to reclaim his past, understand the present and look into the future. Meilenwald has also written that the mythological lyrical aspects had almost completely disappeared on Srontgorrth.

== Reception ==
Srontgorrth was featured on Rock Hard magazine's list 250 Black-Metal-Alben, die man kennen sollte ('250 black metal albums you should know').

== Track listing ==
1. "Kapitel Eins. Der Frühling: Als die Tore sich öffnen... (Freiheit oder Untergang?)" – Chapter One. The Spring: As the Gates Open... (Freedom or Ruin?) – 16:45
  - Sonnenfinsternis Eins: Zeit der Schatten – Solar Eclipse One: Time of Shadows
  - Eine Geburt – A Birth
  - Sonnenfinsternis Zwei: Unter neuen Wolken – Solar Eclipse Two: Under New Clouds
  - Wind der Verwesung – Wind of Rotting
2. Kapitel Zwei. Der Sommer: Die Existenz jenseits der Tore (Begreifen des Bewußtseins ist Streben nach Wissen) – Chapter Two. The Summer: Existence on the Other Side of the Gates (Understanding of Consciousness Is Striving After Knowledge) – 16:10
  - Mein Thron auf den Leibern verstorbener Freunde – My Throne upon the Bodies of My Dead Friends
  - Mondschatten – Moonshade
3. Kapitel Drei. Der Herbst: Endzeit (Vernunft siegt über Nostalgie) – Chapter Three. The Autumn: Endtime (Reason Triumphs over Nostalgia) – 9:18
4. Kapitel Vier. Der Winter: Trümmer – Chapter Four. The Winter: Debris – 9:35
5. Kapitel Fünf. Willkommen zu Haus (...denn keine Sonne schmelzt mich, das Licht, die Freiheit, den Untergang) – Chapter Five. Welcome Home (...Because No Sun Melts Me, the Light, the Freedom, the Ruin) – 18:09
