= Trivia Goddess =

Studio album by Year of the Goat
- Released: September 12, 2025
- Studio: Studio Underjord; TheVoiceLab; Temple of YOTG; Psalm Studios
- Genre: Occult rock · Hard rock · Doom metal · Progressive rock
- Length: 51:29
- Label: Napalm Records

Singles from Trivia Goddess
- 1. "Alucarda" Released: July 9, 2025; 2. "The Power of Eve" Released: August 13, 2025; 3. "Trivia Goddess" Released: September 12, 2025

Trivia Goddess is the fourth album by the Swedish occult rock and progressive rock band Year of the Goat. It was released on September 12, 2025, via Napalm Records.

== Track listing ==
No.	Title	Length
1.	"The Power of Eve"	06:48
2.	"Trivia Goddess"	04:28
3.	"Kiss of a Serpent"	05:39
4.	"Mét Agwe"	08:00
5.	"The Queen of Zemargad"	03:08
6.	"Alucarda"	05:11
7.	"King of Damnation"	06:50
8.	"Crescent Moon"	04:21
9.	"Witch of the Woods"	07:02
Total length:		51:29

== Personnel ==
- Thomas Lucem Ferre Sabbathi Eriksson - vocals & guitars
- Mikael Mihailo Popovic - vocals, keyboards, acoustic guitar
- Jonas Erik Waldhuber Mattsson - guitars & backing vocals
- David Håkan Andreas Olofsson - guitars
- Daniel Melo Ortega - drums
- Marko Kardum - bass
- Elin Gårdfalk - backing vocals
