= Sulphur Aeon =

German death metal band

- Origin: Waltrop, North Rhine-Westphalia, Germany
- Genres: Blackened death metal
- Years active: 2010–present
- Labels: Ván
- Members: Torsten Horstmann; M. Daniel Dickmann; Sascha Schiemann; Andreas Koort
- Website: van-records.com/Sulphur-Aeon_1

Sulphur Aeon is a German death metal band founded in 2010. The band has released four full-length studio albums. The first album, Swallowed by the Ocean's Tide was released in 2013 and the most recent, Seven Crowns and Seven Seals in 2023.

== History ==
The band was founded in 2010 by Torsten Horstmann. Along with the producer Simon Werner the first demo was recorded and released. Simon Werner and Torsten Horstmann had previously played together in the band December Flower.

The band's albums thematize the Cthulhu Mythos, which can also be found in the artwork of the albums.

In 2013, Swallowed by the Ocean's Tide was released on the Imperium Productions label. After signing to Ván Records, the second album Gateway to the Antisphere followed in 2015. In the January 2019 issue of German Metal Hammer magazine, the album The Scythe of Cosmic Chaos, released in 2018, was voted "Album of the Month" by the editors. The album received many positive reviews upon its release with the reviewers of powermetal.de website calling it a "Meisterwerk" (masterpiece). Also the Rock Hard magazine called the album a "masterpiece" and rated it 9 out of 10. Musikreviews.de rated the album 13 out of 15. A music video was released for the song Yuggothian Spell, based on Lovecraft's The Haunter of the Dark.

== Discography ==
- Sulphur Psalms (2010, demo)
- Deep Deep Down They Sleep (2012, EP, Imperium Productions)
- Swallowed by the Ocean's Tide (2013, album, Imperium Productions)
- Gateway to the Antisphere (2015, album, Ván Records / Imperium Productions)
- The Scythe of Cosmic Chaos (2018, album, Ván Records / Imperium Productions)
- Unaussprechliche Kulte (Live at Culthe Fest 2019) (2020, live album, Ván Records)
- Seven Crowns and Seven Seals (2023, album, Ván Records)
