= Hünengrab im Herbst =

Studio album by Nagelfar
- Released: December 1997
- Recorded: September 1997
- Studio: Stage One Studios
- Genre: Black metal
- Length: 55:33
- Label: Kettenhund
- Producer: Andy Classen

Nagelfar chronology
Jagd (1996)	Hünengrab im Herbst (1997)	Srontgorrth (1999)

Hünengrab im Herbst is the first studio album by German black metal band Nagelfar. It was recorded in Andy Classen's Stage-One-Studio in September 1997 and was released via Kettenhund Records in December 1997.

== Sound ==
On this album, Nagelfar combined Northern black metal influences with their own rhythmicity and influences from their Teutonic thrash metal background. The vocals were partly "crazily screamed", partly clean and "heroically sung". The production by Andy Classen, who had never worked with black metal bands before, gave them "a brutal yet 'true' sound". The production, which was "extremely fat and punchy for black metal conditions", is considered "an important building stone for the success of this album". Drummer Alexander von Meilenwald believes the band distanced themselves from the Scandinavian sound with Hünengrab im Herbst; according to him, the album "did not sound as black metal did at that time".

== Lyrics ==
Hünengrab im Herbst lyrics deal with mythology and the depths of the human soul.

== Reception ==
In his review for the German Rock Hard magazine, Frank Stöver wrote that he would not have expected that progress after their two mediocre demo releases (he had reviewed the first one, Als die Tore sich öffnen, in his own fanzine Voices from the Darkside while the second one, Jagd, had been reviewed by Sascha Falquet) and that Nagelfar may "undoubtedly catapult themselves to the top of the German black metal scene".

Rock Hard journalist Wolf-Rüdiger Mühlmann called Hünengrab im Herbst "the most important German black metal album" and placed it on rank 16 of 25 on the magazine's list Die 25 wichtigsten Black-Metal-Alben aller Zeiten ('the 25 most important black metal albums of all times').

== Track listing ==
1. "Intro" – 0:26
2. "Seelenland" – Land of the Souls – 5:21 (Lyrics: Jander; Music: Zorn)
3. "Schwanengesang" – Swan Song – 14:16 (Lyrics: Sveinn; Music: Mellenwald)
4. "Hünengrab im Herbst" – Dolmen in the Autumn – 5:32 (Lyrics: Sveinn; Music: Mellenwald)
5. "Bildnis der Apokalypse" – Portrait of the Apocalypse – 6:22 (Lyrics and Music: Zorn)
6. "Srontgorrth (Das dritte Kapitel)" – Srontgorrth (The Third Chapter) – 9:34 (Lyrics: Sveinn; Music: Zorn)
7. "Der Flug des Raben" – The Flight of the Raven – 14:00 (Lyrics: Jander; Music: Mellenwald)

== Personnel ==
- Jander: Vocals, acoustic guitars on track 2
- Zorn: Guitars
- Sveinn: Bass on all tracks except track 2
- Mellenwald: Drums, percussion, keyboards, bass on track 2
