= Hero (Bölzer album) =

Studio album by Bölzer
- Released: November 25, 2016
- Recorded: Woodshed Studios in Landshut, Bavaria, Germany
- Genre: Black metal, death metal, sludge metal
- Length: 46:38
- Language: English, Icelandic
- Label: Iron Bonehead Productions

Bölzer chronology
Soma (2014)	Hero (2016)	Lese Majesty (2019)

Hero is the debut full-length studio album by the Swiss extreme metal band Bölzer. The album was released on November 25, 2016 through Iron Bonehead Productions and Invictus Productions. The band made the tracks 'I Am III' and 'Spiritual Athleticism' available to stream in advance of the album's release. The album received generally positive reviews from music critics upon release, although the changes in musical style compared to the band's previous records was a divisive matter among fans and music critics.

== Musical style and writing ==
Hero is a concept album, described by Okoi Jones as "a thematic amalgamation of the two EP's – note the duality within this union. It constitutes a triad, a tale in three chapters where the new-born spirit of ages past acts as a protagonist." Music critic Tom O'Boyle has described some of the album's central themes as being "human nature in the face of mythological enormity; a transformation of the flaws of body and soul; and a thirst for seeking knowledge of the unknown forces that evade us." Jones also explains that "I believe the present is in dire need of the hero figure – the inspiration; the igniter of emotions, of will and motivation and passion." Structurally, the album is "modelled after the nine-folded existential domain in Norse mythology. It revolves around a heroic cycle, and my idea was to bind this together in a conceptual valknut." As a result, the album is "a saga of six acts, full songs paired in threes with an intermission between." The first, fifth, and final tracks represent "beings from Norse mythology called Norns, the old Scandinavian equivalent of what are generally called Fates – female entities who spin the web of human fate. Each Norn is represented by a triangle on the thematic valknut. The three Fates predict what's happening to the hero throughout his life-span, from birth to death. Or rebirth to death rather, now that I'm working with Nietzschean principles again."

== Critical reception ==
Professional ratings
Review scores
Source	Rating
Exclaim!	8/10
Metal Hammer	4.5/5 stars

The album received generally positive reviews from music critics. Exclaim! noted the prominent inclusion of clean vocals in the band's sound and its potentially divisive character, but wrote that ""The Archer" depicts just how successful and emotive a walk outside the marketplace can be." They also made reference to the significant pressure the band were under with the release of Hero, writing that "few bands could manage to live up to such a celebrated career established prior to a first full-length, but Bölzer are, thankfully, an abnormal entity." Metal Hammer also noted the surprising developments to the band's musical style since the release of their previous EP, writing that with the premiere of the track 'I Am III', "Gone was the oppressive darkness, the rough-hewn edges, replaced with a wider, liberated sound, the riffs still progressively undulating, hungry and sharp, but with their keening edge gilded." They singled out the track 'Phosphor' as the album's best, describing it as "majestic pace and power combining with an infectious, stabbing groove beneath transcendent leads, pummelling, pounding, taking your breath away, lifting your gaze above blinding, sunlit thunderclouds." In the website's monthly column, The Quietus' Kez Whelan compared the band's progression to fellow Swiss metal band Celtic Frost, and concluded by writing that "There's a marked evolution from the EPs that some may find jarring, but just go with it, and you'll find everything you loved about them here plus a whole host of new ideas, atmospheric details, stirring performances and, most importantly, brilliant songs."

== Track listing ==
All tracks are written by Bölzer

No.	Title	Length
1.	"Urðr"	1:04
2.	"The Archer"	6:12
3.	"Hero"	7:29
4.	"Phosphor" (Vocals by Sturla Viðar)	7:47
5.	"Decima"	0:52
6.	"I Am III"	9:23
7.	"Spiritual Athleticism"	5:48
8.	"Chlorophyllia"	7:19
9.	"Atropos"	0:42
Total length:		46:38

== Personnel ==
- KzR (Okoi Jones) – guitar, vocals
- HzR (Fabian Wyrsch) – drums
- Victor Santura – mixing, mastering
- Michael Zech – mixing, mastering
- Sturla Viðar – guest vocals (track 4)
- D.G. – vocal recording engineer (track 4)
