= Nagelfar =

German black metal band

- Origin: Germany
- Genres: Black metal
- Years active: 1993–2002
- Labels: Kettenhund; Ars Metalli; Ván
- Past members: Zingultus Zorn Alexander von Meilenwald

Nagelfar were a German black metal band.

== Biography ==
Nagelfar were founded in 1993 by guitarist Zorn and drummer Rykthius von Meilenwald, now known by his civil name as Alexander von Meilenwald. They decided that the band would only exist while both of them were members. The first steady lineup was established in 1995, when bass player Sveinn Hackelnberg joined and Jander replaced vocalist Smaug. This lineup recorded the band's first demo, Als die Tore sich öffnen ("As the Gates Open") in late 1995 as a rehearsal production, and their second demo, Jagd ("Hunt"), in October 1996 in a semi-professional 8-track studio. A short time before the recordings, the band had signed a contract with Kettenhund Records from Bremen, founded in 1996 by Andreas Lacher, a former editor of the German Soluzen fanzine (using the pseudonym Yog-Sototh).

In September 1997, the band recorded their first album, Hünengrab im Herbst, in Andy Classen's Stage-One-Studio. It was released via Kettenhund Records in December 1997. In his review for the German Rock Hard magazine, Frank Stöver wrote that he would not have expected that progress after their two mediocre demo releases (he had reviewed the first one in his own fanzine Voices from the Darkside while the second one had been reviewed by Sascha Falquet) and that Nagelfar may "undoubtedly catapult themselves to the top of the German black metal scene". A split EP with Jander's other band Dark Embrace, a dark metal band from Aachen, containing the track "Nur ein See" ("Only One Lake"), had been recorded in July 1997 and was released via Sombre Records from the Ore Mountains in January 1998.

In late 1998, Sveinn Hackenberg departed for personal reasons and left the lyrical concept of the Srontgorrth story. The recordings for the concept album had coinciding setbacks, which resulted in the departure of Jander, who therefore only contributed some parts of the vocals. By the time the album was released in early 1999, bass player Chaos had joined Nagelfar. After the release, Lacher ended Kettenhund Records because he lacked time to go on with the label and was a bit demoralised by "rip offs" in the scene, so the band had to look for a new one. Lacher, whom the band considered a friend, was stabbed to death in a discothèque in Bremen in December 2001. Meilenwald dedicated the first The Ruins of Beverast album to him.

In autumn 1999, vocalist Zingultus joined Nagelfar. They recorded the self-produced 2-track MCD Garzweiler II which was published as an exclusive Wód-Ván release and limited to one copy. After the recordings, Chaos left the band in March 2000. The same month, Nagelfar signed a contract for two albums Ars Metalli from Frankfurt (Oder). The three remaining members recorded their third album, Virus West, in June 2000, again at the Stage-One-Studio. It was followed by a contribution to a limited split EP with Bluttaufe released in autumn 2000 via Christhunt Productions. Virus West was released in summer 2001. As the band could not find a suitable bass player, they decided to continue with the remaining lineup and hired Gnarl from the band Graupel as a constant session bassist for live performances.

In April 2002, Nagelfar disbanded, a decision that surprised the scene. Years later, Meilenwald explained that Zorn had told Zingultus and him that he lacked the energy and motivation he would have needed for Nagelfar, and Zorn and Meilenwald had decided that the band would not exist without one of them. Nagelfar refuse any offers for reunion concerts.

Nagelfar are often referred to as an important or legendary band. Legacy journalist Johannes Paul Köhler wrote they have achieved "world fame". Rock Hard journalist Wolf-Rüdiger Mühlmann called them the "kings of the Westwall", "legendary protagonists" and "by far the most important German black metal band of the so-called second generation" whose three albums "let the scene […] explode". He called their debut album "the most important German black metal album", placed on rank 16 of 25 on the magazine's list Die 25 wichtigsten Black-Metal-Alben aller Zeiten ('the 25 most important black metal albums of all times'). Their two following albums were featured on the magazine's list 250 Black-Metal-Alben, die man kennen sollte ('250 black metal albums you should know').

After the band's breakup, drummer Alexander von Meilenwald went on to form the one-man band The Ruins of Beverast and became the drummer of Heemat and a session member of Kermania (whose leader Weigand is influenced by early Nagelfar) and Truppensturm. He, Zingultus and Hackelnberg founded the Wòd-Ván, a group of black metal fans mainly (but not exclusively) from the region around Aachen. Zingultus also plays in the bands Graupel and Graven. Zorn formed Simple Existenz.

== Musical style ==
In 2002, when asked about the band's influences, Alexander von Meilenwald once replied that comparisons with diverse Scandinavian bands could "(unfortunately) not be denied", but that he could not tell what bands influence him when writing songs, or if any do, and another time mentioned the early releases of Burzum, Darkthrone, Emperor, Marduk and Immortal. In a 2009 interview, he mentioned the early Scandinavian pioneers as an undeniable influence in the beginning. Jander's vocals were influenced by Burzum, whom he calls his most important influence, and whom all early band members were fascinated by according to Meilenwald. Meilenwald mentioned that the first Srontgorrth chapter was influenced by Enslaved's "Slaget i skogen bortenfor". But he believes the band already distanced themselves from that on Hünengrab im Herbst; the album "did not sound as black metal did at that time". On their debut album, Nagelfar combined Northern black metal influences with their own rhythmicity and influences from their Teutonic thrash metal background. The vocals were party "crazily screamed", partly clean and "heroically sung". The production by Andy Classen, who had never worked with black metal bands before, gave them "a brutal yet 'true' sound". The production, which was "extremely fat and punchy for black metal conditions", is considered "an important building stone for the success of this album".

After their first album, the band took another approach to their music and experimented with industrial elements on Srontgorrth. Virus West is more inspired by traditional black metal than the first two albums, except the production. Meilenwald "think[s] 'Virus West' already indicated that Nagelfar were departing from the shores of all-too dreamy, melodic and 'beautiful' Black Metal. The development to the point of founding The Ruins of Beverast merely strengthened me in my decision to create music of immense gloom and trepidation, surreal and dark."

== Lyrics and ideology ==
Naglfar took their name from the ship Naglfar from Norse mythology but used its German spelling because they were a German band and used the Pagan symbols "more related to (Western) German history". Despite the Pagan lyrics, and although "[i]t was Euronymous' dogma that Black Metal necessarily had to have a satanic background" and "Nagelfar has never been a satanic band", they always considered themselves "pure black metal in every aspect" and not as a pagan metal band. The band considered some statements of the black metal scene hilarious and distanced themselves from them, which earned them respect by some and hatred by others and led "to bizarre, ambivalent insults […]. We were dirty punks for some, dirty fascists for others." The debut album's lyrics dealt with mythology and the depths of the human soul. According to Legacy journalist Johannes Paul Köhler, the second album, Srontgorrth, dealt with the total solar eclipse in 1999, while Meilenwald explained it as the fictional story of an individual freed from the prison of the unconscious and striving to reclaim his past, understand the present and look into the future. While Köhler wrote that with vocalist Zingultus, the band moved away from the Pagan lyrics, Meilenwald wrote that the mythological aspects had almost completely disappeared on Srontgorrth and were more important to Virus West again. The third album's cover displays the Westwall, which, according to Alexander von Meilenwald, is not supposed to be interpreted politically but "is the dark side of the Western German landscape and supposed to support the musical scenario. 'Virus West' is a pathogen coming from the west—that's us." According to Meilenwald, most people "may have realised by now that the political content in black metal contradicts the original idea and has a weak ideological fundament". He called politics a "mixture of lies, hunger for power and megalomania". The band considered it to be important to remain apolitical; Zorn called radical politics in music annoying but added he does not care about political beliefs that are kept out of the music. Nonetheless, the drummer pointed a finger at "Turks" and "North Africans" and equated them with social problems.

== Discography ==
=== Albums ===
- 1997 – Hünengrab im Herbst (Kettenhund Records)
- 1999 – Srontgorrth (Kettenhund Records)
- 2001 – Virus West (Ars Metalli Records)

=== Demos ===
- 1995 – Als die Tore sich öffnen
- 1996 – Jagd

=== EPs ===
- 1997 – split with Dark Embrace (Kettenhund Records)
- 2000 – split with Bluttaufe (Christhunt Productions)

=== Anthology ===
- 2017 – Alte Welten

They have two EPs, which have never been available to the public in their entirety: Garzweiler II and Ragnarök; however, all of Ragnarök apart from a brief outro track was included on the compilation Alte Welten (Old Worlds), released in 2017. The exclusive track "Der Erlösung Totgeburt" appears on the Wurzelgeister compilation LP, alongside tracks by Lunar Aurora, Nocte Obducta and other bands, as well as on Alte Welten.

The band re-released its entire official discography on vinyl in 2017 through Ván Records; much of this content had never been available on vinyl before. Much of this material was also given an official digital release for the first time, including the band's demos.
