= Come Reap =

EP by The Devil's Blood
- Released: 18 November 2008
- Recorded: Void Studios (Eindhoven)
- Genre: Occult rock, psychedelic rock, hard rock
- Length: 27:44
- Label: Profound Lore Records, VÁN Records
- Producer: Pieter Kloos

The Devil's Blood chronology
| Come Reap (2008) | The Time of No Time Evermore (2009) |

Professional ratings
Review scores
| Source | Rating |
|---|---|
| AllMusic | 4.5/5 stars |
| Sputnikmusic | 4/5 stars |

Come Reap is the first EP by Dutch occult-themed rock group The Devil's Blood. It was released in Europe on 18 November 2008 through Profound Lore Records and VÁN Records.

== Track listing ==
| No. | Title | Length |
|---|---|---|
| 1. | "Come, Reap" | 5:08 |
| 2. | "River of Gold" | 4:18 |
| 3. | "The Heavens Cry Out for the Devil's Blood" | 5:34 |
| 4. | "White Faces" (Roky Erickson cover) | 2:43 |
| 5. | "Voodoo Dust" | 10:01 |
| Total length: | | 27:44 |

== Personnel ==
=== The Devil's Blood ===
- Farida 'F. the Mouth of Satan' Lemouchi – vocals
- Selim 'SL' Lemouchi – guitar, bass guitar
- Thomas 'T' Sciarone – guitar
- Sander 'S' van Baalen – drums

=== Production ===
- Pieter Kloos – production, engineering

=== Design ===
- Thomas 'T' Sciarone – layout
