= The Devil's Blood =

Dutch rock band

Background information
- Origin: Eindhoven, Netherlands
- Genres: Occult rock, psychedelic rock, hard rock
- Years active: 2006–2013
- Labels: Metal Blade (United States); VÁN Records (Europe)
- Past members: Farida "F. The Mouth of Satan" Lemouchi; Selim "SL" Lemouchi; Sander 'B' van Baalen; Thomas 'T' Sciarone; Benjamin 'Jimmy Blitzer' Dokter; Willem 'Will Power' Verbuyst; Job 'J' van de Zande; Ron 'R' van Herpen; Micha 'M' Haring; Oeds 'O' Beydals
- Website: thedevilsblood.com

The Devil's Blood was a Dutch occult rock band from Eindhoven, formed in 2006. Their style is hard rock in the vein of Black Widow, Coven, Black Sabbath, and a variety of 1970s underground progressive and psychedelic rock. It has been described as "seductive, rather than aggressive", featuring female vocals, classical guitar leads, analog atmospherics, and "vintage satanic hooks."

== History ==
The group was founded by lead guitarist, lyricist, and principal songwriter Selim "SL" Lemouchi. SL's sister, Farida "F. The Mouth of Satan" Lemouchi, was invited to join the band after providing vocals for the song "The Graveyard Shuffle." The group's name is taken from the song "Devil's Blood" by Swedish black metal band Watain.

On 17 April 2008, the band made their live debut at Roadburn Festival.

On 11 September 2009, the group released their first full-length album, The Time of No Time Evermore, through Ván Records.

On 11 November 2011, the band released their second full-length album, The Thousandfold Epicentre, also through Ván Records; it was later released in the United States through Metal Blade Records on 17 January 2012. Following the US release of the album, the band embarked on the Decibel Magazine Tour 2012 – headlined by the Polish blackened death metal band Behemoth – which encompassed twenty-six tour stops across North America. During the tour, the band received some publicity after their bus driver allegedly ran off with their money, leaving them stranded at an intersection in San Antonio, Texas. SL stated the group planned to continue to tour throughout the remainder of the year and play in as many locations as possible.

On 25 January 2013, the band's official Facebook announced that The Devil's Blood was no more. However, they announced on 7 February 2013 that they would release their unfinished third album, III: Tabula Rasa or Death and the Seven Pillars, an acoustic EP, 66:2, a live DVD, and some live recordings.

In March 2014, Selim Lemouchi died at the age of 33. It was revealed that the cause of death was suicide.

On 20 June 2017, The Devil's Blood members Farida Lemouchi, Ron van Herpen, Oeds Beydals, Thomas Sciarone, Job van de Zande, Sander van Baalen, and Micha Haring did a one-off reunion to perform "Voodoo Dust" at a memorial service for their former manager and booking agent Danny "Bidi" van Drongelen.

== Musical style and influences ==
SL was heavily influenced by his spiritual beliefs, namely Satanism. In several interviews, SL stated that his primary influence in songwriting (and in life) was "the three principalities of Adversity – The Death, The Chaos, and The Satan," stating, "That (Satan) is the driving force behind all my creative power." SL also cited Slash of the American hard rock band Guns N' Roses as being influential in his work as a guitarist.

== Band members ==
- Selim "SL" Lemouchi – guitars, vocals (2007–2013)
- Farida "The Mouth of Satan" Lemouchi – lead vocals (2007–2013)
- Oeds "O" Beydals – guitars (2011–2013)
- Micha "M" Haring – drums (2011–2013)
- Ron "R" van Herpen – guitars (2008–2013)
- Job "J" van de Zande – bass (2008–2013)
- Thomas "T" Sciarone – guitars (2008–2011)
- Sander "B" van Baalen – drums (2007–2011)
- Willem "Will Power" Verbuyst – guitars (2008)
- Benjamin "Jimmy Blitzer" Dokter – bass (2008)

== Discography ==
=== Albums ===
- The Time of No Time Evermore (2009)
- The Thousandfold Epicentre (2011)
- III: Tabula Rasa or Death and the Seven Pillars (2013)

=== Demos ===
- Demo 2007 (2007)

=== Extended plays and singles ===
- The Graveyard Shuffle 7" single (2008)
- Come Reap EP (2008)
- I'll Be Your Ghost CD/12" single (2009)
- Fire Burning 7" single (2011)

== See also ==
- List of Dutch musicians
- List of psychedelic rock artists
- Music of the Netherlands
