= The Time of No Time Evermore =

Studio album by The Devil's Blood
- Released: 11 September 2009
- Recorded: Void Studios (Eindhoven)
- Genre: Occult rock, psychedelic rock, hard rock
- Length: 54:33
- Label: Ván Records
- Producer: Pieter Kloos

The Devil's Blood chronology
Come Reap (2008)	The Time of No Time Evermore (2009)	The Thousandfold Epicentre (2011)

Professional ratings
Review scores
Source	Rating
AllMusic	4/5 stars
Sputnikmusic	4/5 stars

The Time of No Time Evermore is the first full-length studio album by Dutch occult-themed rock group The Devil's Blood. It was released in Europe on 11 September 2009 through Ván Records and later distributed in the United States on 25 May 2010 through AFM Records.

== Track listing ==
No.	Title	Length
1.	"The Time of No Time"	2:18
2.	"Evermore"	3:10
3.	"I'll Be Your Ghost"	4:12
4.	"The Yonder Beckons"	6:04
5.	"House of Ten Thousand Voices"	5:11
6.	"Christ or Cocaine"	5:13
7.	"Queen of My Burning Heart"	3:55
8.	"Angel's Prayer"	4:32
9.	"Feeding the Fire with Tears and Blood"	5:10
10.	"Rake Your Nails Across the Firmament"	3:44
11.	"The Anti Kosmik Magick"	11:11
Total length:		54:33

== Personnel ==
=== The Devil's Blood ===
- Farida 'F. the Mouth of Satan' Lemouchi – vocals
- Selim 'SL' Lemouchi – guitar
- Ron 'R' van Herpen – guitar
- Thomas 'T' Sciarone – guitar
- Job 'J' van de Zande – bass guitar
- Sander 'S' van Baalen – drums

=== Additional musicians ===
- Willem 'Will Power' Verbuyst – lead guitar on "The Anti Kosmik Magick"

=== Production ===
- Pieter Kloos – production, engineering
- Selim 'SL' Lemouchi – production

=== Design ===
- Erik Danielsson – artwork
