= Söngvar elds og óreiðu =

Studio album by Misþyrming
- Released: 7 February 2015
- Recorded: 2014
- Studio: Gryfjan
- Genre: Black metal
- Length: 43:14
- Language: Icelandic
- Label: Terratur Possessions; Vánagandr

Misþyrming chronology
Söngvar elds og óreiðu (2015)	Hof (2017)

Söngvar elds og óreiðu (Icelandic: Songs of Fire and Chaos) is the debut studio album by Icelandic black metal band Misþyrming, released on 7 February 2015 via Terratur Possessions.

== Background and recording ==
Söngvar elds og óreiðu was recorded in 2014 by the band's founder and main songwriter D.G. along with drummer H.R.H.

== Critical reception ==
In December 2015, Stereogum published a list of the 50 best metal albums, in which Söngvar elds og óreiðu was ranked at number 28. Trevor Strnad of The Black Dahlia Murder placed the album at number four in his list of the 100 best albums for Metal Injection, and David Lee Rothmund of the news outlet MetalSucks placed the release at number five. Al Necro, reviewing for the English-language online magazine CVLT Nation, noted that Söngvar elds og óreiðu is not an album of "end-to-end, unarranged banging", noting that each track is dedicated to "each section of the riff, which is so precise that few black metal bands can pull off full-length releases". DJPaulsGimpArm, reviewing for the online music site Sputnikmusic, noted that "the overall sound is reminiscent of the raw 'Nordic' style that was prevalent in the early '90s, but done with a modern twist", giving the album a 3.5, while Kim Kelly of Vice called the album "incredible".

== Track listing ==
No.	Title	Length
1.	"Söngur heiftar"	4:54
2.	"…af þjáningu og þrá"	4:16
3.	"Endalokasálmar"	5:29
4.	"Frostauðn"	4:25
5.	"Er haustið ber að garði"	2:29
6.	"Friðþæging blýþungra hjartna"	6:49
7.	"Söngur uppljómunar"	3:56
8.	"Ég byggði dyr í eyðimörkinni"	7:34
9.	"Stjörnuþoka"	3:22
Total length:		43:14

== Personnel ==
- D. G. (Dagur Gíslason) – guitar, lead vocals, keyboards, bass
- H. R. H. (Helgi Rafn Hróðmarsson) – drums
