= The Thousandfold Epicentre =

Studio album by The Devil's Blood
- Released: 11 November 2011
- Recorded: Void Studios (Eindhoven)
- Genre: Occult rock, psychedelic rock, hard rock
- Length: 73:56
- Label: Metal Blade Records (US); VÁN Records (EU)
- Producer: Pieter Kloos

The Devil's Blood chronology
The Time Of No Time Evermore (2009)	The Thousandfold Epicentre (2011)	III: Tabula Rasa or Death and the Seven Pillars (2013)

Professional ratings
Aggregate scores
Source	Rating
Metacritic	79/100
Review scores
Source	Rating
About.com	4/5 stars
Allmusic	3.5/5 stars
Blistering	8.5/10 stars
Exclaim	unfavorable
PopMatters	8/10 stars
Revolver	3.5/5 stars
Sputnikmusic	3.5/5 stars

The Thousandfold Epicentre is the second and final full-length studio album by Dutch occult-themed rock group The Devil's Blood.

== Writing and recording ==
The album was reportedly composed over a period of eleven months from January 2010 to November 2010 before it was recorded over a period of two months at Void Studios with longtime producer, engineer, and mixer Pieter Kloos. Several songs were ultimately shortened by a few minutes so that the album length would not exceed the length of a CD.

== Release and promotion ==
The album was first released in Europe on 11 November 2011 through VÁN Records and later in the United States through Metal Blade Records on 17 January 2012. The album has been released by both labels in CD, LP, and digital download formats. A limited-edition version of the album, which includes a 36-page art book, has also been made available through VÁN Records.

On 9 December 2011 the track "Fire Burning" was featured on Pitchfork for streaming. And on 9 January 2012 the track "Die The Death" was featured on Decibel for streaming. A seven part video teaser series featuring song samples and album artwork were released by the band in the weeks leading up to the albums US release date.

== Critical reception ==
The album has received mainly positive reviews from music critics. Metacritic assigned an average score of 79 to the album based on 6 reviews, which indicates "generally favorable reviews". Noisecreep placed the album at No. 4 in their "Best Albums of 2011" list.

The album debuted at "76" in the Dutch Albums Top 100, remaining in that position for a period of one week.

== Track listing ==
All tracks are written by Selim Lemouchi, The Devil's Blood.

No.	Title	Length
1.	"Unending Singularity"	2:18
2.	"On the Wings of Gloria"	7:04
3.	"Die the Death"	3:53
4.	"Within the Charnel House of Love"	3:35
5.	"Cruel Lover"	7:26
6.	"She"	5:39
7.	"The Thousandfold Epicentre"	9:02
8.	"Fire Burning"	5:06
9.	"Everlasting Saturnalia"	6:13
10.	"The Madness of Serpents"	8:28
11.	"Feverdance"	15:15
Total length:		73:56

== Personnel ==
The Thousandfold Epicentre album personnel adapted from Allmusic.

- Farida Lemouchi "F. the Mouth of Satan" – vocals
- Selim Lemouchi "SL" – composer, lyrics, guitar
- Rob Oorthuis – composer, guitar
- Koen Lommers – effects, guitar, tape manipulation
- Ron van Herpen – Guitar
- Micha Haring – Drums
- Job van de Zande – bass
- Igor De Wit – percussion
- Arno Landsbergen – Clavinet, Fender Rhodes, Hammond B3, piano
- Tommie Eriksson – composer
- Hans Timmermans – orchestral arrangements
- Pieter Kloos – effects, engineering, mastering, mixing, production, tape manipulation, vocals
- Sitis Aeterna – artwork, design
- Nobody's Fool – artwork, design
