= III: Tabula Rasa or Death and the Seven Pillars =

Studio album by The Devil's Blood
- Released: 11 June 2013
- Genre: Occult rock, psychedelic rock, hard rock
- Length: 64:58
- Label: Metal Blade Records (US); VÁN Records (EU)

The Devil's Blood chronology
The Thousandfold Epicentre (2011)	III: Tabula Rasa or Death and the Seven Pillars (2013)

Professional ratings
Review scores
Source	Rating
AllMusic	4/5 stars

III: Tabula Rasa or Death and the Seven Pillars is the final release by Dutch occult-themed rock group The Devil's Blood. The album is made of unfinished demos recorded at the home studio of Selim Lemouchi.

== Track listing ==
All tracks are written by Selim Lemouchi, The Devil's Blood.

No.	Title	Length
1.	"I Was Promised a Hunt": I. "...and the holy cunt spewed forth abomination..."; II. "...wielding the hammer of the dead..."; III. "...upon the aimless path...""	22:01
2.	"The Lullaby of the Burning Boy"	4:11
3.	"...If Not a Vessel?"	4:47
4.	"In the Loving Arms of Lunacy's Secret Demons"	5:55
5.	"Dance of the Elements"	9:39
6.	"White Storm of Teeth"	10:01
7.	"Tabula Rasa"	8:24
Total length:		64:58

== Personnel ==
Album personnel adapted from Allmusic.

- Selim Lemouchi "SL" – composer, bass, guitar, engineering, programming
- Farida Lemouchi "F. the Mouth of Satan" – vocals
