= Hour of 13 =

American doom metal band

- Origin: Hickory, North Carolina, United States
- Genres: Doom metal; heavy metal
- Years active: 2006–2013 (hiatus)
- Labels: Shadow Kingdom Records; Eyes Like Snow; Svart Records; Yersinia Pestis; Earache Records
- Members: Chad Davis
- Past members: Luc Valcourt; Corey Leonard; Robb Pritchard; Ben Hogg; John Mode; Brandon Munday; Mark Eles; Chris Taylor; Dave Easter; Ryan Adams; Emile Quigley; Anaïs Chareyre; Lar Bowler
- Website: Official Myspace

Hour of 13 is an American doom metal band that formed in Hickory, North Carolina in 2006 and is currently signed to Shadow Kingdom Records. Taking their name from the film titled City of the Dead. The band combines doom metal with a traditional heavy metal sound.

== Biography ==
In 2007 the band released their self-titled debut album on Shadow Kingdom Records. In 2009 Swanson left the band leaving Davis to form a new line up. However, Swanson returned later in the year, and the band became a duo once again. In 2010, the second album titled The Ritualist was released on Eyes Like Snow. In 2011 Swanson left again and Ben Hogg was found as his replacement. But in November, Swanson rejoined the band for a second time working with Davis on a new album which was released in May 2012 via Earache Records. In late 2012 Who's to Blame? was released as the band's debut music video.

== Status ==
Hour of 13 - Statement - 10-1-2016

In late 2006, multi-instrumentalist Chad Davis and vocalist Philip Swanson formed Hour of 13 in North Carolina, initially composing material influenced by classic heavy metal and traditional doom metal. The project subsequently signed with Shadow Kingdom Records in August 2007 to release their self-titled debut album. Following the debut's reception within the underground metal community, the band experienced a series of lineup changes and periodic hiatuses, with Davis remaining the principal songwriter alongside recurrent departures and returns by Swanson.

Due to a professional ordeal that was both good and bad, along with the passing of some of its closest friends, the idea to lay it to rest until the right time was evident and heeded. Coupled with all of the problems, departures and returns, backlash and all around trash talk, the ideals were continued under the NIGHT MAGIC name. The slumber for Ho13 in its name had been thought to be eternal. Forever. But, as we all know, NOTHING is forever..

As of 10-1-2016, I am pleased to announce the chains of past problems have been broken, and with the aid and support of the following gained within its initial unveiling, HOUR OF 13 have resumed exactly where it was laid to rest. To be honest, I myself have been waiting, and waiting, and waiting for the day this could be. All I have wanted was to feel the fires of creation rise, and I am more than excited to be able to continue the original intent of HOUR OF 13. Complete details as to the current incarnation of this rebirth is unknown at the moment. However, to be able to bring to you, the supporters, this return is very much my namesake.

With this return also comes the announcement of an HOUR OF 13 retrospect double LP/CD/Cassette release coming later this year. Titled "Salt The Dead: Rare and Unreleased", this collection contains material from the beginning up until its rest. Shadow Kingdom Records, who gave Ho13 its initial push with the release of the debut album, will release this collection. More info will be announced when the release dates are known.

Hails to each and every one of you. I honor your support til the end of the Earth. In His name we praise the fires of Hell!

Regards, Chad Davis - Hour of 13"

== Discography ==
- Hour of 13 (2007)
- The Ritualist (2010)
- Possession / Darkness (2010) - Single
- The Rites of Samhain (2010) - EP
- 333 (2012)
- Lucky Bones (2012) - EP
- "Black Magick Rites" (2021)

== Lineup ==
=== Current members ===
- Chad Davis – guitars/bass/drums/vocals (2006–present)

=== Former members ===
- Laura Nelson - vocals and drums (2023–2024)
- Manny Rodriguez - bass (2024)
- Phil Swanson - vocals (2006–09, 2009–11, 2011–13)
- Brandon Munday - guitars (2010–13)
- Ben Hogg - vocals (2011)
- Emile Quigley - bass (2012)
- Anaïs Chareyre - drums (2012)
- Lar Bowler - guitars (2012)
- Luc Valcourt - drums
- Corey Leonard - guitars
- Robb Pritchard - vocals
- John Mode - bass
- Mark Eles - bass
- Chris Taylor - drums
- Dave Easter - drums
- Ryan Adams - guitars
