= Svartidauði =

Icelandic band

- Origin: Kópavogur, Iceland
- Genres: Black metal
- Years active: 2002–2022
- Labels: Ván Records, Terratur Possessions, Daemon Worship Productions
- Members: Magnús; Þórir; Sturla Viðar
- Past members: Gunnar; Egill Þór; Birkir; Hafþór; Næturfrost; Nökkvi

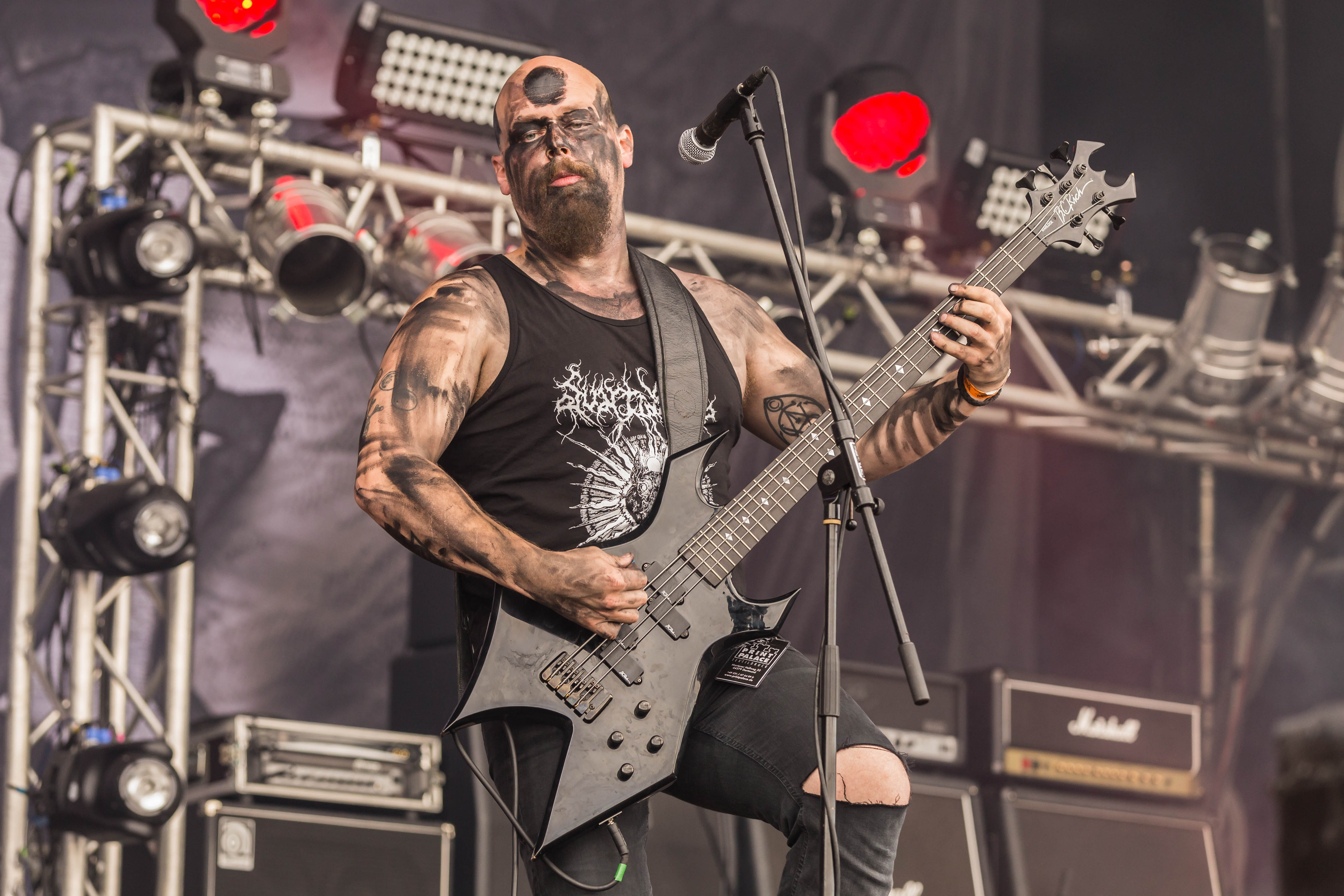
Svartidauði Party.San Metal Open Air 2019 05

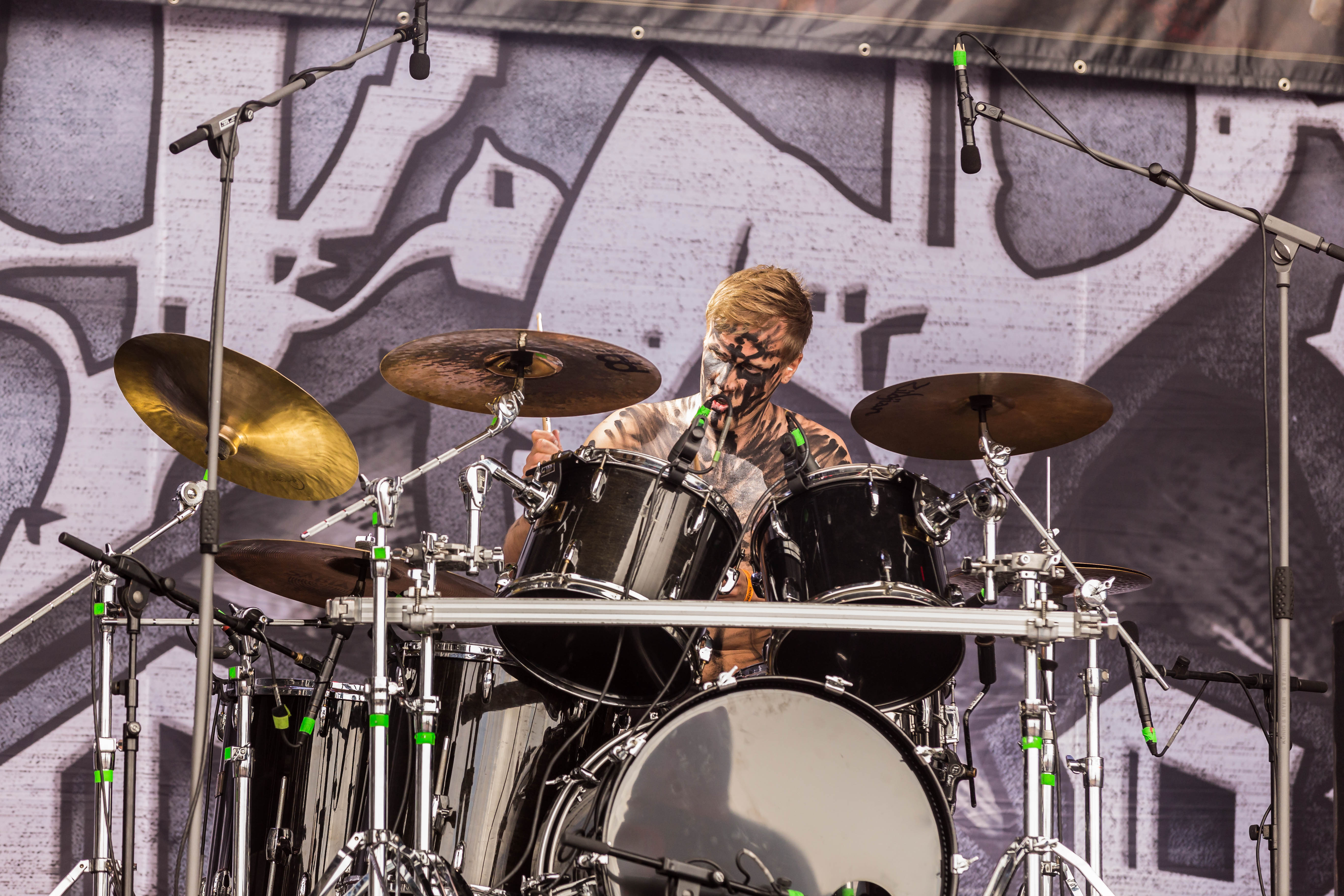
Svartidauði Party.San Metal Open Air 2019 03

Svartidauði were an Icelandic black metal band from Kópavogur that formed in 2002 and disbanded in 2022. The name 'Svarti Dauði' is Icelandic for "Black Death". They released three demos before they released their debut album Flesh Cathedral on Terratur Possessions in 2012, as well as a split EP with the Chilean black metal band 'Perdition'. Flesh Cathedral was received well by the metal press, gaining positive reviews from websites such as Metal-Fi, Lurker's Path, Metal Ireland, and LA Music Blog. Iceland Music Export writes that the band is "Already infamous for their chaotic and often violent live shows in their native Iceland..."

== History ==
On 3 March 2014 Svartidauði announced the release of a new EP titled The Synthesis of Whore and Beast, due out on 30 April 2014 through Terratur Possessions and Daemon Worship Productions. The EP was produced by Stephen Lockhart at Studio Emissary and was available on CD and 12-inch vinyl. Reviewing the EP, Lords of Metal gave it 95/100 and wrote that "you are left broken, your twisted finger going for the play button and full of joy you dive back into the hell only Svartidauði can deliver."

On 5 March 2014 the band played at the Kings of Black Metal Festival 2014 alongside famous black metal bands such as Mayhem, Hate, and Behexen.

On 7 March 2014 Svartidauði headlined on a European tour called 'Untamed and Unchained 2014' with Mgła, A Thousand Lost Civilizations, and One Tail, One Head. which covered Poland, Italy, Switzerland, The United Kingdom, Belgium and more. The band also took part in the Speyer Grey Mass festival in Germany on 15 March 2014, alongside such bands as Ofermod, Archgoat, Pseudogod, and Funeral Winds.

On 23 March 2014 the band confirmed that they would be performing at Aurora Infernalis in the Netherlands on 25 October 2014, alongside Sapientia and Mortuus from Sweden, and Cult of Fire from Czech Republic.

On 6 September 2017 it was announced that guitarist Nökkvi Gylfgason had departed from the band. On 7 September the band announced that they would be releasing a new 7-inch EP during their 2017 'Continental Crucifixion' tour with Bölzer, Archgoat, and Eggs of Gomorrh. On 15 September the band announced that they had entered the studio to begin the recording process for a second full-length album titled Revelations of the Red Sword which was released through Ván Records on 3 December 2018.

On 15 December 2022, in an interview for Bardo Methodology, D.G. from Misþyrming confirmed that Svartidauði had split up. Drummer Magnús moved to Misþyrming.

== Discography ==
=== Albums ===
- Flesh Cathedral (2012, Terratur Possessions)
- Revelations of the Red Sword (2018, Ván Records)

=== EPs ===
- Perdition / Svartidauði Split (2012, World Terror Committee)
- The Synthesis of Whore and Beast (2014, Terratur Possessions/Daemon Worship Productions)
- Hideous Silhouettes of Lynched Gods (2016, Terrarur Possessions)
- Untitled (2017, Ván Records)

=== Demos ===
- The Temple of Deformation (2006, self-released, re-issued on CD 2010)
- Adorned With Fire (2009, self-released)
- Those Who Crawl and Slither Shall Again Inherit the Earth (2010, self-released)

== Band members ==
=== Last known members ===
- Magnús – Drums
- Þórir – Guitars
- Sturla Viðar – Bass, vocals

=== Live members ===
- Gústaf "G.E." Evensen – Guitars (2017–2022)

=== Former members ===
- Gunnar – Bass
- Egill Þór – Bass
- Birkir – Bass
- Hafþór – Drums
- Næturfrost – Guitars
- Nökkvi – Guitars (2002–2017)
