= The Ruins of Beverast =

German blackened doom metal band

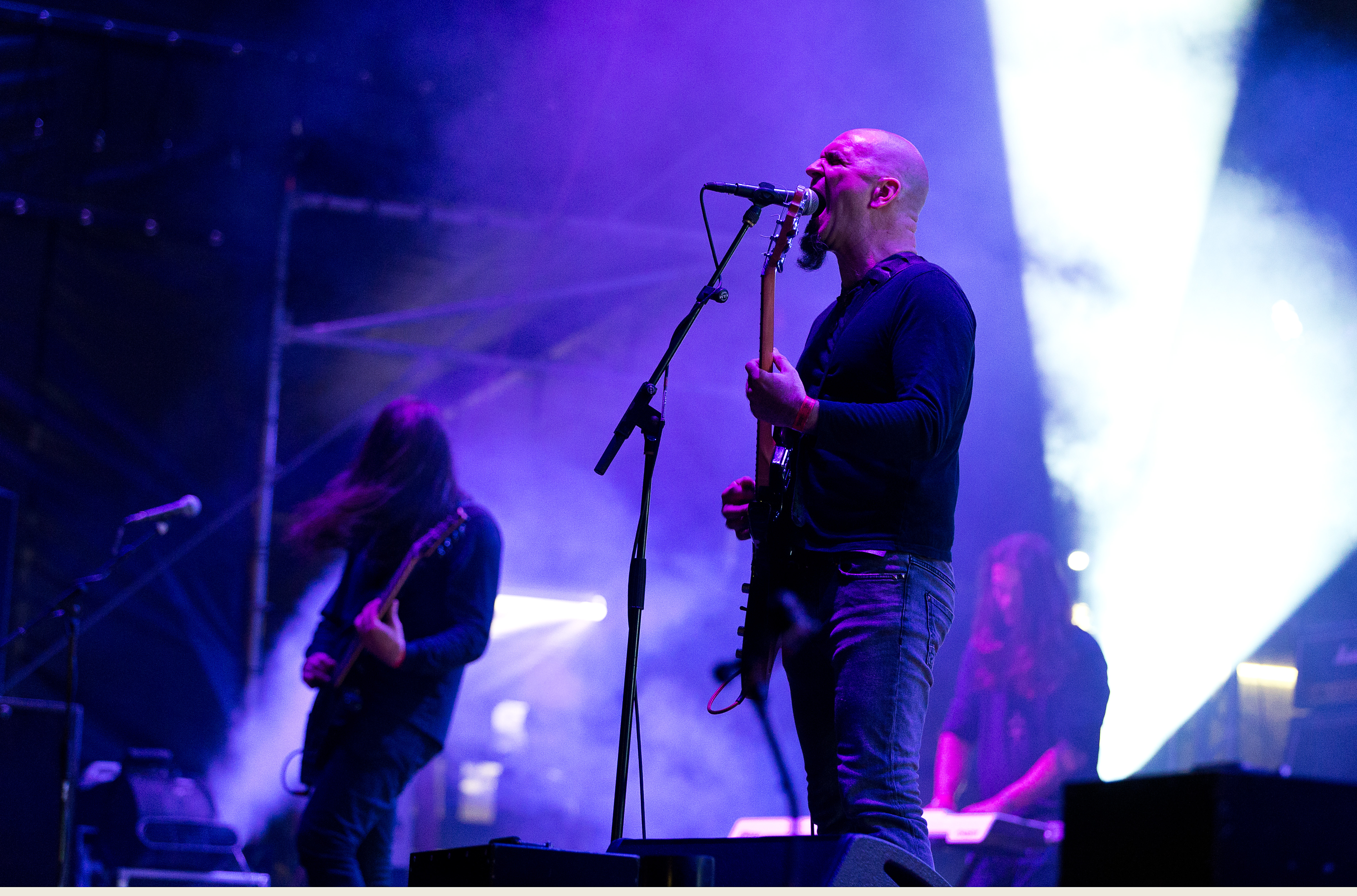
- The Ruins of Beverast at Party.San 2015

Background information
- Origin: Aachen, Germany
- Genres: Atmospheric black metal; doom metal
- Years active: 2003–present
- Label: Ván
- Members: Alexander von Meilenwald

The Ruins of Beverast is a German blackened doom metal project formed by Alexander von Meilenwald in 2003 after the disbandment of his previous band Nagelfar. "Beverast" is Meilenwald's own derivation of the word "Bifröst", the old Norse term for the bridge between Midgard and Asgard.

Six albums have been released under the moniker through Ván Records. Since 2013, von Meilenwald has also performed live with an expanded line-up under the band's name. Apart from occasional appearances by session musicians, he continues to perform all instruments and vocals on the band's studio material. Der Spiegel called the third album Foulest Semen of a Sheltered Elite a "highly complex" album and rated it 8 out of 10. The album Exuvia was released in 2017. It was well received by the metal press. Metal Hammer Germany rated it 6 out of 7, Metal.de 9 out of 10.

== Discography ==
=== Albums ===
- Unlock the Shrine (2004)
- Rain Upon the Impure (2006)
- Foulest Semen of a Sheltered Elite (2009)
- Blood Vaults – The Blazing Gospel of Heinrich Kramer (2013)
- Exuvia (2017)
- The Thule Grimoires (2021)
- Tempelschlaf (2026)

=== EPs ===
- Takitum Tootem! (2016)

=== Compilations ===
- Enchanted by Gravemould I (2011)
- Untitled split with Almyrkvi (2020)

=== Limited editions ===
- The Furious Waves of Damnation (2003)
- Gott in uns (2007) (split with Deathgate Arkanum, Nihil Nocturne and Anti)
- Hours of the Aequinox (2007)
- Untitled split with Urfaust (2007)
