= Alexander von Meilenwald =

German musician

Alexander von Meilenwald (German: [ˈmaɪlənvalt]; born 1978) is a German multi-instrumentalist and vocalist known for his former band Nagelfar and his project The Ruins of Beverast.

== Biography ==
Meilenwald was born in Aachen. At the age of 15, he read an interview with Darkthrone member Nocturno Culto which fascinated him, after he had realised the supposedly extreme band Cannibal Corpse were "just normal metalheads". He then bought Darkthrone's A Blaze in the Northern Sky and believed "that this must be music made by deranged people". He got to know Sveinn Hackelnberg and founded Nagelfar with him and two other members.

In April 2002, Nagelfar disbanded, a decision that surprised the scene. Years later, Meilenwald explained that Zorn had told Nagelfar vocalist Zingultus and him that he lacked the energy and motivation he would have needed for Nagelfar, and Zorn and Meilenwald had decided that the band would not exist without one of them. Nagelfar refuse any offers for reunion concerts.

After the band's breakup, Meilenwald went on to form the one-man band The Ruins of Beverast and became the drummer of Heemat and a session member of Kermania (whose leader Weigand is influenced by early Nagelfar) and Truppensturm. He, Zingultus and Hackelnberg founded the Wòd-Ván, a group of black metal fans mainly (but not exclusively) from the region around Aachen.

A 2009 article by Rock Hard journalist Wolf-Rüdiger Mühlmann mentions that Meilenwald is age 31 and a student of history, linguistics and psychology.
