= Kristian Wåhlin =

Swedish musician and artist (born 1971)

- Also known as: Necrolord, Chris Steele
- Born: 4 December 1971 (age 54); Gothenburg, Västra Götaland County, Sweden
- Genres: Death metal, melodic death metal, black metal, gothic metal, power metal, doom metal
- Occupations: Musician, graphic designer
- Instruments: Guitar, vocals, drums (early)
- Years active: 1988–present
- Website: kristianwahlin.com

Kristian Wåhlin (born 4 December 1971) is a Swedish musician, singer, graphic designer and album cover artist for many bands in the extreme metal scene worldwide. He is often credited under his pseudonym Necrolord.

== Biography ==
Wåhlin's interest in art began while attending Schillerska Grammar School, a secondary educational institution in central Gothenburg. He has referenced Romantic and Renaissance painters like Caspar David Friedrich, Albrecht Dürer and Hieronymus Bosch as early influences. This interest also coincided with the time in which he studied music.

At the age of 17, Wåhlin formed Grotesque (as guitarist) with school friend Tomas Lindberg on vocals, Alf Svensson on guitar, and Tomas Eriksson on drums. The 1990 break-up of Grotesque would lead to the formation of At the Gates, who would be credited as instigators of the "Gothenburg melodic death metal sound". Wåhlin would collaborate with Lindberg and other At the Gates members a short time additionally in the death metal band Liers in Wait, and would go on to design the "Russian icon" cover-art of At the Gates' cornerstone release, Slaughter of the Soul.

Dissection, who shared practice quarters with At the Gates, would display illustrations by Wåhlin on the cover of The Somberlain and also Storm of the Light's Bane; the latter featuring the infamous scene of the "grim reaper horseman" in the middle of a snow-covered forest-tundra. In the Nightside Eclipse, the debut of seminal Norwegian black metal band Emperor, also featured his work on the cover. Wåhlin would continue as an album artist for several other bands in the European death, black, doom, power and gothic metal collective throughout the 2000s.

Liers in Wait and Decollation would feature musical contribution by Wåhlin before both groups folded in the mid-1990s. In 1995 he started gothic metal band Diabolique, where he was joined by some musicians from bands in which he had previously participated. Diabolique's latest release was The Green Goddess in 2001. They are currently writing material for an upcoming 2010 album. Wåhlin also collaborated with longtime friend Lindberg in the hardcore band The Great Deceiver.

His art studio is located in Höganäs municipality, Sweden.

== Discography ==
Artist	Year	Album	Credit
Grotesque	1996	In the Embrace of Evil (Compilation)	Guitar
Liers in Wait	1992	Spiritually Uncontrolled Art (EP)	Guitar
Decollation	1993	Cursed Lands (EP)	Drums
Diabolique	1996	The Diabolique (EP)	Vocals and guitar
Diabolique	1997	Wedding the Grotesque	Vocals and guitar
Diabolique	1999	The Black Flower	Vocals and guitar
Diabolique	2000	Butterflies (EP)	Vocals and guitar
Diabolique	2001	The Green Goddess	Vocals and guitar
The Great Deceiver	1999	Cave In (EP)	Guitar
The Great Deceiver	2000	Jet Black Art (2000)	Guitar
The Great Deceiver	2002	A Venom Well Designed	Guitar
The Great Deceiver	2004	Terra Incognito	Guitar
The Great Deceiver	2007	Life Is Wasted on the Living	Guitar

== Album covers ==
Artist	Year	Album
Ablaze My Sorrow	1996	If Emotions Still Burn
Aeon	2012	Aeons Black
Amorphis	1996	Elegy
Amorphis	2010	Magic & Mayhem – Tales from the Early Years
Antestor	2000	Martyrium
Antestor	2004	Det tapte liv (EP)
Antestor	2005	The Forsaken
Apostasy	2004	Cell 666
At the Gates	1995	Slaughter of the Soul
Atheist	1993	Elements
Auberon	1998	The Tale of Black
Bathory	1996	Blood on Ice
Bathory	2002	Nordland I
Bathory	2003	Nordland II
Bathory	2006	In Memory of Quorthon (Compilation)
Becoming the Archetype	2008	Dichotomy
Benediction	2001	Organised Chaos
The Black Dahlia Murder	2007	Nocturnal
The Black Dahlia Murder	2017	Nightbringers
Bloodwork	2014	World Without End
Blut aus Nord	2014	Memoria Vetusta III: Saturnian Poetry
Cemetary	1992	An Evil Shade of Grey
Cemetary	1996	Sundown
Cemetary	1997	Last Confession
Cemetary	2000	The Beast Divine (as Cemetary 1213)
Cemetary	2005	Phantasma
Crimson Midwinter	1998	Random Chaos
Crown of Thorns	1995	The Burning
Crown of Thorns	1997	Eternal Death
Crystal Age	1995	Far Beyond Divine Horizons
Crystal Eyes	2000	In Silence They March
Crystal Eyes	2003	Vengeance Descending
Dark Funeral	1996	The Secrets of the Black Arts
Dark Funeral	2005	In the Sign... (EP) (reissue of Dark Funeral)
Dark Funeral	2016	Where Shadows Forever Reign
Dark Tranquillity	1995	The Gallery
Decollation	1992	Cursed Lands (EP)
Desecrator	1990	Black Sermons (EP)
Desultory	1994	Bitterness
Diabolique	1997	Wedding the Grotesque
Diabolique	1998	The Diabolique (EP)
Diabolique	1999	Black Flower
Diabolique	2000	Butterflies (EP)
Diabolique	2001	The Green Goddess
Dismember	1995	Massive Killing Capacity
Dissection	1991	The Grief Prophecy (EP)
Dissection	1991	Into Infinite Obscurity (EP)
Dissection	1993	The Somberlain
Dissection	1995	Storm of the Light's Bane
Dissection	1996	Where Dead Angels Lie (EP)
Dissection	2003	Live Legacy (Live album)
Dissection	2004	Maha Kali (Single)
Dreams of Damnation	2000	Let the Violence Begin
Earth Flight	2011	Blue Hour Confessions
Ebony Tears	1997	Tortura Insomniae
Edge of Sanity	1994	Purgatory Afterglow
Edge of Sanity	2003	Crimson II
Emperor	1994	In the Nightside Eclipse
The End	1996	The End (EP) (logo)
Ensiferum	2001	Ensiferum
Ensiferum	2004	Iron
Ensiferum	2007	Victory Songs
Ensiferum	2009	From Afar
Ensiferum	2012	Unsung Heroes
Epitaph	1993	Seeming Salvation
Epitaph	2016	Sinner Waketh
The Equinox ov the Gods	1996	Images of Forgotten Memories
The Equinox ov the Gods	1997	Fruits and Flowers of the Spectral Garden
Evergrey	1998	The Dark Discovery (logo)
Evergrey	1999	Solitude, Dominance, Tragedy
Evocation	2007	Tales from the Tomb (logo)
Evocation	2008	Dead Calm Chaos (logo)
Evocation	2010	Apocalyptic (logo)
Evocation	2012	Illusions of Grandeur (logo)
Excruciate	1993	Passage of Life
Exempt	1992	Ill Health (EP)
Extol	1998	Burial
Extol	1999	Mesmerized (EP)
Firewind	2002	Between Heaven and Hell
The Generals	2009	Stand Up Straight
Godgory	1999	Resurrection
Godgory	2001	Way Beyond
Grand Magus	2010	Hammer of the North
Graveworm	2003	Engraved in Black
The Great Deceiver	2000	Jet Black Art (EP)
The Great Deceiver	2002	A Venom Well Designed
The Great Deceiver	2004	Terra Incognito
The Great Deceiver	2007	Life Is Wasted on the Living (collaboration with Jacob Bannon of Converge)
Grotesque	1996	In the Embrace of Evil (Compilation)
Heads or Tales	1995	Eternity Becomes a Lie
Heavenly	2000	Coming from the Sky
Hexen	2012	Being and Nothingness
Hexenhaus	1997	Dejavoodoo
Hollow	1998	Modern Cathedral
Hollow	1999	Architect of the Mind
Hypocrisy	2009	A Taste of Extreme Divinity
Hypocrisy	2011	Hell Over Sofia: 20 Years of Chaos and Confusion (Live DVD)
I Am the Night	2022	While the Gods Are Sleeping
Impious	1998	Evilized
In Aeternum	1999	Forever Blasphemy
In Aeternum	2000	The Pestilent Plague
In Mourning	2012	The Weight of Oceans
In Mourning	2016	Afterglow
In Mourning	2019	Garden of Storms
Incrave	2008	Dead End
Incubus	1996	Serpent Temptation (re-recorded issue)
Infinity	2013	Non de Hac Terra
Iron Fire	2000	Thunderstorm
Jennie Tebler's Out of Oblivion	2008	Till Death Tear Us Part
Keen Hue	1993	Juicy Fruit Lucy
King Diamond	1998	Voodoo
Lake of Tears	1994	Greater Art
Lake of Tears	1995	Headstones
Lake of Tears	1997	A Crimson Cosmos
Lake of Tears	2002	The Neonai
Lake of Tears	2004	Greatest Tears Vol I (Compilation)
Lake of Tears	2004	Greatest Tears Vol II (Compilation)
Laudamus	2003	Lost in Vain
Liers in Wait	1996	Spiritually Uncontrolled Art (EP)
Light This City	2008	Stormchaser
Luciferion	1994	Demonication (The Manifest)
The Man from the Moon	2007	Rocket Attack
Meduza	2002	Now and Forever
Memento Mori	1996	La Danse Macabre
Memento Mori	1997	Songs for the Apocalypse Vol. IV
Memory Garden	1995	Forever (EP)
Memory Garden	1999	Verdict of Posterity
Memory Garden	2000	Mirage
Merciless	1994	Unbound
Mercyful Fate	1998	Dead Again
The Moaning	1997	Blood From Stone
Morbid	2000	December Moon (EP, reissue)
Morgana Lefay	1993	Knowing Just as I
Morgana Lefay	1993	The Secret Doctrine
Morgana Lefay	1995	Sanctified
Morgana Lefay	1996	Maleficium
Morgana Lefay	1999	The Seventh Seal (as Lefay)
Morgana Lefay	2000	...---... (SOS) (as Lefay)
Morgana Lefay	2005	Grand Materia
Morgana Lefay	2007	Aberrations of the Mind
Narnia	1998	Awakening
Narnia	1999	Long Live the King
Narnia	2001	Desert Land
Necrophobic	1997	Darkside
Necrophobic	2018	Mark of the Necrogram
Necrophobic	2020	Dawn of the Damned
Netherbird	2010	Monument Black Colossal
Nifelheim	1995	Nifelheim
Nifelheim	1998	Devil's Force
Nirvana 2002	2009	Recordings 89-91 (Compilation) (logo)
Nokturnal Mortum	2017	Істина (Istyna, Verity)
Opprobrium	2000	Discerning Forces
Opus Irae	2015	The Burden of Man (EP)
Phlebotomized	1993	Preach Eternal Gospels (EP)
Protector	2013	Reanimated Homunculus
Protector	2016	Cursed and Coronated
Raise Hell	1998	Holy Target
Rosicrucian	1992	Silence
Rosicrucian	1994	No Cause for Celebration
Sacramentum	1996	Far Away from the Sun
Sacrilege	1996	Lost in the Beauty You Slay
Sacrilege	1997	The Fifth Season
Sathanas	2007	Crowned Infernal
Scum	1995	Purple Dreams and Magic Poems
Setherial	2003	Endtime Divine
Shattered	2004	Wrapped in Plastic
Sins of Omission	1999	The Creation
Soul Reaper	2003	Life Erazer
Stortregn	2013	Evocation of Light
Suicidal Angels	2009	Sanctify the Darkness
Tad Morose	1993	Leaving the Past Behind
Tad Morose	1995	Sender of Thoughts
Tad Morose	1995	Paradigma (EP)
Therion	1992	Beyond Sanctorum
Therion	1993	Symphony Masses: Ho Drakon Ho Megas
Therion	1995	Lepaca Kliffoth
Thulcandra	2010	Fallen Angel's Dominion
Thulcandra	2011	Under a Frozen Sun
Thulcandra	2015	Ascension Lost
Thundersteel	1994	Thundersteel
Tiamat	1990	Sumerian Cry
Tiamat	1990	A Winter Shadow (Single)
Tiamat	1991	The Astral Sleep
Tiamat	1992	Clouds
Tiamat	1994	The Sleeping Beauty: Live in Israel (Live EP)
Tiamat	1994	Wildhoney
Utumno	1993	Across the Horizon
Vicious Art	2004	Fire Falls and the Waiting Waters
Wintersun	2004	Wintersun
Wisdom Call	2001	Wisdom Call
Witchery	1998	Restless & Dead
Witchery	1999	Witchburner (EP)
Witchery	1999	Dead, Hot & Ready
Witchery	2001	Symphony for the Devil
Witherfall	2017	Nocturnes and Requiems
Witherfall	2018	A Prelude to Sorrow
Witherfall	2019	Vintage
Witherfall	2021	Curse of Autumn
Woods of Infinity	2011	Förlåt
Wuthering Heights	1999	Within
Various Artists	1996	Beauty in Darkness
Various Artists	1997	Beauty in Darkness, Vol. 2
Various Artists	1999	Beauty in Darkness, Vol. 3
Various Artists	2000	Black Sun Records Catalog 2000
Various Artists	2003	Come Armageddon: Endtime Productions V Years
Various Artists	1994	Death ... Is Just the Beginning III
Various Artists	1997	Death ... Is Just the Beginning IV
Various Artists	1999	Death ... Is Just the Beginning V
Various Artists	2000	Death ... Is Just the Beginning VI
Various Artists	2002	Death ... Is Just the Beginning Classics (DVD)
Various Artists	2006	December Songs: A Tribute to Katatonia
Various Artists	2002	King Diamond Tribute
Various Artists	2006	Maximum Metal Vol. 100 (DVD)
Various Artists	2006	Maximum Metal Vol. 104 (DVD)
Various Artists	2006	Maximum Metal Vol. 111 (DVD)
Various Artists	2007	Maximum Metal Vol. 114 (DVD)
Various Artists	2007	Maximum Metal Vol. 117 (DVD)
Various Artists	2007	Maximum Metal Vol. 120 (DVD)
Various Artists	2008	Maximum Metal Vol. 123 (DVD)
Various Artists	2008	Maximum Metal Vol. 126 (DVD)
Various Artists	2008	Maximum Metal Vol. 129 (DVD)
Various Artists	2008	Maximum Metal Vol. 132 (DVD)
Various Artists	2008	Maximum Metal Vol. 135 (DVD)
Various Artists	2009	Maximum Metal Vol. 138 (DVD)
Various Artists	1999	Metal Dreams
Various Artists	2000	Metal Dreams Vol. 2
Various Artists	2001	Metal Dreams Vol. 3
Various Artists	2002	Metal Dreams Vol. 4
Various Artists	2003	Metal Dreams Vol. 5
Various Artists	2005	Metal Message Vol. II
Various Artists	2005	Monsters of Death (DVD)
Various Artists	2007	Monsters of Death Vol. 2 (DVD)
Various Artists	2003	Monsters of Metal - The Ultimate Metal Compilation (DVD)
Various Artists	2004	Monsters of Metal - The Ultimate Metal Compilation Vol. 2 (DVD)
Various Artists	2004	Monsters of Metal - The Ultimate Metal Compilation Vol. 3 (DVD)
Various Artists	2005	Monsters of Metal - The Ultimate Metal Compilation Vol. 4 (DVD)
Various Artists	2006	Monsters of Metal - The Ultimate Metal Compilation Vol. 5 (DVD)
Various Artists	2008	Monsters of Metal - The Ultimate Metal Compilation Vol. 6 (DVD)
Various Artists	2009	Monsters of Metal - The Ultimate Metal Compilation Vol. 7 (DVD)
Various Artists	1995	Slatanic Slaughter: A Tribute to Slayer
Various Artists	1996	Slatanic Slaughter II: A Tribute to Slayer
Various Artists	1998	Sepulchral Feast: A Tribute to Sepultura (can also be found as "Sepultural Feast")
Various Artists	2002	Tyrants of the Abyss: A Tribute to Morbid Angel
