= A Crimson Cosmos =

Studio album by Lake of Tears
- Released: 13 May 1997
- Recorded: January 1997 at Soundtrade Studios, Stockholm
- Genre: Gothic metal, psychedelic rock
- Length: 39:43
- Label: Black Mark
- Producer: Ronny Lahti, Lake of Tears

Lake of Tears chronology
Headstones (1995)	A Crimson Cosmos (1997)	Forever Autumn (1999)

A Crimson Cosmos is the third studio album by the Swedish gothic metal band Lake of Tears. It was released in 1997. Its melodic sound with psychedelic influences reappeared in most of the band's later releases. The song "Lady Rosenred" was released as a single, also in 1997, with "Devil's Diner" and "A Crimson Cosmos" as B-sides. A video for "Devil's Diner" appeared on the Black Mark DVD Metal by Metal, released in 2003.

== Critical reception ==
Professional ratings
Review scores
Source	Rating
Rock Hard	9/10

In 2005, A Crimson Cosmos was ranked number 347 in Rock Hard magazine's book The 500 Greatest Rock & Metal Albums of All Time.

== Track listing ==
All songs written by Daniel Brennare.

No.	Title	Length
1.	"Boogie Bubble"	4:51
2.	"Cosmic Weed"	3:51
3.	"When My Sun Comes Down"	4:59
4.	"Devil's Diner"	3:43
5.	"The Four Strings of Mourning"	5:40
6.	"To Die Is to Wake"	3:48
7.	"Lady Rosenred"	2:34
8.	"Raistlin and the Rose"	5:23
9.	"A Crimson Cosmos"	4:54
Total length:		39:43

== Personnel ==
- Daniel Brennare – vocals, guitar
- Mikael Larsson – bass
- Johan Oudhuis – drums

=== Additional personnel ===
- Jennie Tebler – vocals
- Magnus Sahlgren – guitars on tracks 1, 5–7, 9
- Ronny Lahti – keyboards, guitars, producer, engineering
- Pelle Hogbring – keyboards
- Kristian Wåhlin – cover art, layout
- Stig Börje Forsberg – producer
- Peter in de Betou – mastering
- M. Kumpe – executive design, typography
