= The Coming of Chaos =

Studio album by Sacramentum
- Released: 4 November 1997
- Genre: Melodic black metal
- Length: 50:06
- Label: Century Media Records (1997, 2024); Cosmic Key Creations (2017, 2020)
- Producer: Sacramentum, Andy LaRocque

Sacramentum chronology
Far Away from the Sun (1996)	The Coming of Chaos (1997)	Thy Black Destiny (1999)

The Coming of Chaos is the second studio album by Swedish black metal band Sacramentum, released in 1997 through Century Media Records.

It was produced by Andy LaRocque and the band.

The album was later re-released several times. In 2024, it was mixed and remastered by Dan Swanö and also got new artwork by Kristian Wåhlin.

== Critical reception ==
In a very short review, Allmusic's Steve Huey noted that it was "the best Sacramentum release available", being worth 4 stars. Rock Hard gave an 8 out of 10 score.

Chronicles of Chaos only gave 6 out of 10, finding that the band failed to reach "top class" except for the production value. "Though technically impressive, this fruit salad of riffs doesn't lead to very good songs. The lack of variation in the vocals, which change only to deliver brief speeches, doesn't compliment the music at all. On the whole: some songs are good and some are boring; none are awful, but similarly none are brilliant".

Metal.de went all the way up to 10 out of 10. As opposed to several other bands in the same genre, "Sacramentum understands something about creativity and compelling execution", leading to every song being of high value. "None of the nine songs on this album sound alike; each has its own atmosphere, charisma, and melody, and they immediately captivate me", wrote the reviewer. Powermetal.de was not far behind, giving a 9.5 score to the 2024 reissue. The original release was described as "their magnum opus" and a "masterpiece". It was also "criminally neglected" in its time, making the re-release relevant. Ox-Fanzine gave 4.5 of 5. Musically, the band showed "incredible playing finesse" in incorporating "sometimes more, sometimes less obvious" hints of death metal. The reviewer was satisfied with the new artwork, the booklet, and the remastering that made the record sound "considerably more powerful than the first edition".

== Track listing ==
All tracks are written by Sacramentum.

No.	Title	Length
1.	"Dream Death"	5:34
2.	"...As Obsidian"	5:06
3.	"Awaken Chaos"	4:55
4.	"Burning Lust"	4:52
5.	"Abyss of Time"	2:32
6.	"Portal of Blood"	4:21
7.	"Black Destiny"	4:28
8.	"To the Sound of Storms"	4:57
9.	"The Coming of Chaos"	13:21
Total length:		50:06
