= The Neonai =

Studio album by Lake of Tears
- Released: September 2, 2002
- Recorded: April/May 2002 at XTC Studios, Stockholm
- Genres: Gothic metal, electronic rock
- Length: 41:40
- Label: Black Mark
- Producers: Ulf Wahlberg, Lake of Tears

Lake of Tears chronology
Forever Autumn (1999)	The Neonai (2002)	Black Brick Road (2004)

Singles from The Neonai
- 1. "Sorcerers/Nathalie and the Fireflies" Released: 2002

The Neonai is the fifth studio album by the gothic metal band Lake of Tears. It was released in 2002, being finished off by Daniel Brennare alone, with little help from the other band members. The album was hastily completed to honor the band's contract with Black Mark Production. Practically, the band had been on a temporary hiatus since 2000 and Brennare focused on the songs he thought would be most easily produced and mastered. As a result, unlike earlier work by Lake of Tears, the album features a drum machine, a minimal guitar approach, and heavy use of keyboards and electronic equipment. Ironically, it featured some of the band's more memorable tunes, although they differ from the "classic" Lake of Tears sound and feel. A remixed version of the song "Sorcerers" was released as a single, with "Nathalie and the Fireflies" as a B-side.

== Track listing ==
All songs written by Daniel Brennare and arranged by Ulf Wahlberg and Lake of Tears.

No.	Title	Length
1.	"Intro"	01:11
2.	"Return of Ravens"	03:31
3.	"The Shadowshires"	04:09
4.	"Solitude"	05:26
5.	"Leave a Room"	04:12
6.	"Sorcerers"	03:51
7.	"Can Die No More"	03:44
8.	"Nathalie and the Fireflies"	03:31
9.	"Let Us Go as They Do"	04:20
10.	"Down the Nile"	04:24
11.	"Outro"	03:21
Total length:		41:40

== Personnel ==
- Daniel Brennare - vocals, guitar
- Mikael Larsson - bass
- Johan Oudhuis - drums

=== Additional personnel ===
- Jennie Tebler - additional vocals
- Ulf Wahlberg - keyboards, producer, engineering
- Magnus Sahlgren - guitars
- Necrolord - cover art
- Claes Persson - mastering
- Stig Börje Forsberg - producer
