= Excised and Anatomised =

EP by Evocation
- Released: 3 September 2013 (North America)
- Recorded: Recorded at Evocation Studios, mixed and mastered at Unisound Studios
- Genre: Death metal,
- Length: 20:48
- Label: Century Media
- Producer: Evocation, Dan Swanö

Evocation chronology
Illusions of Grandeur (2012)	Excised and Anatomised (2013)

Excised and anatomised is an EP by Swedish death metal band Evocation. The EP contains covers of songs by Bolt Thrower, Carcass, Napalm Death, Edge of Sanity and At The Gates. It was released on 3 September 2013 in North America through iTunes and CMDistro on vinyl.

== Track listing ==
No.	Title	Length
1.	"...For Victory" (originally by Bolt Thrower)	4:38
2.	"Corporal Jigsore Quandary" (originally by Carcass)	5:30
3.	"You Suffer" (originally by Napalm Death)	0:04
4.	"Enigma" (originally by Edge of Sanity)	6:51
5.	"Terminal Spirit Disease" (originally by At The Gates)	3:45
Total length:		20:48

== Personnel ==
Evocation

- Janne K. Bodén - drums
- Vesa Kenttäkumpu - guitars
- Marko Palmén - guitars
- Thomas Josefsson - vocals
- Gustaf Jorde - bass

Miscellaneous staff

- Dan Swanö - mixing, mastering, producer
- Michał "Xaay" Loranc - cover art, layout
