= Black Brick Road =

Studio album by Lake of Tears
- Released: August 30, 2004
- Recorded: February/April 2004 at Studio Mega
- Genres: Gothic metal, progressive rock
- Length: 39:09
- Label: Noise
- Producers: Christian Silver, Lake of Tears

Lake of Tears chronology
The Neonai (2002)	Black Brick Road (2004)	Moons and Mushrooms (2007)

Black Brick Road is the sixth studio release by the gothic metal band Lake of Tears. It was released in 2004, after the band's reunion and signing to Noise Records. The album brought back the gothic sound of their earlier work, combined with some progressive elements.

Christopher J. Kelter of Rough Edge rated the album a three out of four.

== Track listing ==
All songs written by Lake of Tears, except "Sister Sinister" written by Lake of Tears and Stina Rebelius. All lead guitar composed by Magnus Sahlgren.

No.	Title	Length
1.	"The Greymen"	04:45
2.	"Making Evenings"	04:22
3.	"Black Brick Road"	04:01
4.	"Dystopia"	03:48
5.	"The Organ"	04:41
6.	"A Trip with the Moon"	03:56
7.	"Sister Sinister"	04:11
8.	"Rainy Day Away"	04:44
9.	"Crazyman"	04:41
Total length:		39:09

== Personnel ==
- Daniel Brennare - vocals, guitar
- Mikael Larsson - bass
- Johan Oudhuis - drums

=== Additional personnel ===
- Jörgen Cremonese - guitars
- Ulrika Silver - vocals
- Stina Rebelius - vocals
- Dan Helgeson - organ
- Magnus Sahlgren - guitars
- Björn Engelmann - mastering
- Henrik Lycknert - engineering, mixing (assistant)
- Manne Engström - engineering, mixing
- Christian Silver - producer, engineering, mixing
- Björn Gustaffson - artwork, layout
- Anton Hedberg - photography
