= Vengeance Descending =

Vengeance Descending may refer to:

- Vengeance Descending (Crystal Eyes album), 2003
- Vengeance Descending (Nightrage album), 2010
