= Forever Autumn (album) =

Studio album by Lake of Tears
- Released: July 20, 1999
- Recorded: January/March 1999 at XTC-Studios, Stockholm
- Genres: Gothic metal, gothic rock
- Length: 45:25
- Label: Black Mark
- Producers: Ulf Wahlberg, Lake of Tears

Lake of Tears chronology
A Crimson Cosmos (1997)	Forever Autumn (1999)	The Neonai (2002)

Forever Autumn is the fourth studio album by the Swedish doom/gothic metal band Lake of Tears. It is dedicated to the memory of Juha Saarinen--who died four years prior to the album's release. Forever Autumn was released with a bonus track: a radio- edited version of the title track in South Korea by East Rock Records.

== Track listing ==
All songs written by Daniel Brennare.

No.	Title	Length
1.	"So Fell Autumn Rain"	05:22
2.	"Hold On Tight"	04:06
3.	"Forever Autumn"	05:56
4.	"Pagan Wish"	04:23
5.	"Otherwheres"	03:55
6.	"The Homecoming"	05:16
7.	"Come Night I Reign"	03:51
8.	"Demon You/Lily Anne"	04:21
9.	"To Blossom Blue"	08:15
Total length:		45:25

== Personnel ==
- Daniel Brennare - vocals, guitar, lyrics
- Mikael Larsson - bass
- Johan Oudhuis - drums
- Christian Saarinen - keyboards

=== Additional musicians ===
- Henriette Schack - cello
- Bo Hülpheres - flute, accordion
- Magnus Sahlgren - guitars
- Christer Johansson - photography
- Stig Börje Forsberg - producer
- Anders Forsberg - producer, layout
- Tom Müller - mastering
- Ulf Wahlberg - producer, engineering
- Michael Semprevivo - layout
