= Illwill (album) =

Studio album by Lake of Tears
- Released: April 29, 2011
- Genre: Gothic metal
- Length: 40:23
- Label: AFM
- Producers: Lake of Tears, Johan Örnborg

Lake of Tears chronology
Moons and Mushrooms (2007)	Illwill (2011)	Ominous (2021)

Illwill is the eighth studio album by the Swedish band Lake of Tears. It was released in 2011.

== Critical reception ==
Fotis Giakoub of Metal Temple Magazine rated it a 9 out of 10.

== Track listing ==
No.	Title	Length
1.	"Floating in Darkness"	03:14
2.	"Illwill"	04:19
3.	"The Hating"	04:37
4.	"U.N.S.A.N.E."	04:51
5.	"House of the Setting Sun"	05:37
6.	"Behind the Green Door"	03:58
7.	"Parasites"	02:55
8.	"Out of Control"	02:55
9.	"Taste of Hell"	03:46
10.	"Midnight Madness"	04:11
Total length:		40:23

Japanese edition bonus tracks
No.	Title	Length
11.	"Last Purple Sky"	06:02
12.	"Children of the Grey"	04:35
13.	"Planet of the Penguins"	06:26
Total length:		57:26

== Personnel ==
- Daniel Brennare - vocals, guitars
- Fredrik Jordanius - bass, guitars, vocals
- Johan Oudhuis - drums

=== Additional personnel ===
- Mathias Lodmalm - vocals
- Johan Örnborg - guitars, producer, engineering, mixing
- Freddy Zielinsky - bass
- Jens Bogren - mastering
- Anton Hedberg - photography
- Björn Gustaffson - artwork, layout
