= Dead Calm Chaos =

Studio album by Evocation
- Released: 31 October 2008
- Recorded: Recorded and mixed at Evocation Studios, November 2007–August 2008; mastered at Studio Mega in September 2008
- Genre: Death metal, melodic death metal
- Length: 44:07
- Label: Cyclone Empire Records
- Producer: Vesa Kenttäkumpu

Evocation chronology
Tales from the Tomb (2007)	Dead Calm Chaos (2008)	Apocalyptic (2010)

Professional ratings
Review scores
Source	Rating
AllMusic	3.5/5 stars
Metal Temple	8/10 stars
Metal Underground	3.5/5 stars

Dead Calm Chaos is the second studio album by Swedish death metal band Evocation. It was released on 31 October 2008 through Cyclone Empire Records.

== Track listing ==
No.	Title	Length
1.	"In the Reign of Chaos"	02:48
2.	"Silence Sleep"	03:50
3.	"Angel of Torment"	04:45
4.	"Boundead"	03:03
5.	"Dead Calm Chaos"	03:24
6.	"Truth Will Come Clear"	03:02
7.	"Dust"	04:50
8.	"Protected by What Gods"	03:40
9.	"Antidote"	03:55
10.	"Tomorrow Has No Sunrise"	02:54
11.	"Astray Masquerade"	03:11
12.	"Razored to the Bone"	04:45
Total length:		44:07

== Personnel ==
=== Evocation ===
- Janne Kenttäkumpu Bodén – drums, backing vocals
- Martin Toresson – bass
- Thomas Josefsson – vocals
- Vesa Kenttäkumpu – guitars
- Marko Palmén – guitars

=== Guest musicians ===
- Dan Swanö – additional vocals on "Antidote"
- Anders Björler – lead guitars on "Angel of Torment" and "Razored to the Bone"

=== Miscellaneous staff ===
- Robert Elmengård – photography
- Janne Aspenfelt – drum technician
- Kristian Wåhlin – logo
- Travis Smith – cover art, layout, artwork
- Johan Örnborg – mastering
- Christian Silver – mastering
- Vesa Kenttäkumpu – recording, mixing, production, engineering
- Anton Hedberg – photography
