= Envoy of Lucifer =

Studio album by Nifelheim
- Released: 19 November 2007
- Recorded: 4–28 May 2007, Ace Tone Studios in Stockholm, Sweden
- Genre: Black metal, speed metal
- Length: 44:18
- Label: Regain
- Producer: Nifelheim & Micke Borg

Nifelheim chronology
Servants of Darkness (2000)	Envoy of Lucifer (2007)

Professional ratings
Review scores
Source	Rating
AllMusic	3.5/5 stars

Envoy of Lucifer is the fourth full-length studio album from Swedish black metal band Nifelheim. Released in 2007, it is their first (and so far, only) album for Regain Records after they switched from Black Sun following the release of Servants of Darkness in 2000.

For the recording, the band enlisted some special guests; Erik Danielsson from the black metal band Watain co-wrote two songs here, while Set Teitan provided lyrics for one song here and handled additional screaming.

== Track listing ==
- All songs written by Hellbutcher and Tyrant, except where noted.
1. "Infernal Flame of Destruction" - 4:14
2. "Evocation of the End" - 2:18
3. "Open the Gates of Damnation" - 4:31
4. "Claws of Death" (Hellbutcher, Tyrant, Erik Danielsson) - 5:02
5. "Storm of the Reaper" (Hellbutcher, Tyrant, Danielsson) - 4:15
6. "Envoy of Lucifer" (Hellbutcher, Tyrant, Set Teitan) - 3:27
7. "Evil Is Eternal" - 3:59
8. "Raging Flames" - 4:18
9. "Belial's Prey" - 4:23
10. "No More Life" - 7:33

== Personnel ==
=== Nifelheim ===
- Per "Hellbutcher" Gustavsson: Vocals (Satanic Ritual Proclamation)
- Sebastian "Vengeance From Beyond" Ramstedt: Lead & rhythm guitars (Raging Death)
- Johan "Apocalyptic Devastator" Bergebäck: Lead & rhythm guitars (Savage Violation)
- Eric "Tyrant" Gustavsson: Bass
- Peter "Insulter of Jesus Christ!" Stjärnvind: Drums, percussion

=== Additional personnel ===
- Set Teitan: Additional screaming and vocal backing

== Production ==
- Arranged by Nifelheim
- Produced by Nifelheim and Micke Borg
- Engineered by Micke Borg
- Mixed by Micke Borg, Hellbutcher and Tyrant
- Mastered by Peter in de Betou at Tailor Maid Studios (4 August 2007 in Stockholm)
