= Far Away from the Sun =

Studio album by Sacramentum
- Released: 15 May 1996
- Recorded: June–July 1995
- Studios: Unisound Studios, Finspång, Sweden
- Genre: Melodic black metal
- Length: 45:59
- Labels: Adipocere Records (1996); Century Media Records (2013)
- Producer: Sacramentum

Sacramentum chronology
Finis Malorum (1994)	Far Away from the Sun (1996)	The Coming of Chaos (1997)

Far Away from the Sun is the debut studio album by Swedish black metal band Sacramentum, released through Adipocere Records on 15 May 1996.

The album's musical style has been compared to melodic black metal contemporaries such as Dissection and Unanimated, and it is frequently cited as an overlooked classic in the genre.

== Background ==
Following the release of their demo EP Finis Malorum (later reissued on Adipocere Records, to whom the band had signed in 1994), bassist Freddy Andersson and drummer Mikael Rydén left the band, "unwilling to go on after Brolycke and Karlén had decided to move to Gothenburg." Following this, Karlén switched to bass to allow himself to focus more on vocals. After moving to Gothenburg they got in touch with Johan Norman (Decameron, Satanized). Sacramentum asked him to join the band, and Norman offered to bring Nicklas "Terror" Rudolfsson with him. "Ironically, Norman stayed in the band less than six months, before quitting to join Dissection. However, "Terror" did stick around and proved to be "a perfect match"." Thus the lineup that recorded the album was Brolycke, Karlén, and Rudolfsson.

== Style ==
The album's style has been frequently compared to fellow Swedish black metal band Dissection. However, Chronicles of Chaos wrote that "Their style is less aggressive than Dissection, but more intricate" and "their melodic parts are usually either harmonized or have countermelodies". According to Rudolfsson, "When I entered the picture, most of the album was already written and ready to be rehearsed, but I still helped with some riffs, lyrics and arrangements." It has also been described as "cold, raw and epic", and "For most of the record tremolo guitars, blast beats and an oversaturated vocal dominate. There is a touch of gothic metal that a lot of the mid nineties black metal releases incorporated."

== Artwork ==
The artwork was created by Kristian "Necrolord" Wåhlin, a friend of the band at the time and who lived in the same city. Karlén later purchased the original painting from Wåhlin, and is therefore one of only three he has ever agreed to sell, along with Tiamat's albums "Wildhoney" and "Clouds". According to guitarist Anders Brolycke,

"Nisse had this vision about this special place out there for him, as he felt he didn't belong to this world and Kristian perfectly reproduced it for him." This will explain then, why, when you look closely, you realise there are no lights emanating from this ominous looking castle, hidden in some god-forsaken land. "No, and this was intentional as light means life. And there's no life to be found here."

== Release, promotion, marketing ==
The album was released in May 1996, almost a year after the album had been recorded. "For Anders, apart from a lack of promotion and decent distribution, this is one of the main reasons why they've not been positioned as one of the top pioneers in the Swedish scene:

"It's all about timing in the music business as to if you will succeed or not. The basic rule is the earlier the better and people count the release date rather than when the songs were made. This is why it was so unfortunate that it took so long to get the album out. Maybe everything would have been different if it was released one year earlier. But it's one of those 'what if' questions we'll never have the answers to."

The album was reissued by Century Media Records in 2013. For this reissue, the album was remastered by Dan Swanö in November 2012, with a new CD and booklet layout by Nora Dorkling, rescanned high quality album artwork by Necrolord, as well as an in-depth interview with band by Olivier 'Zoltar' Badin. A music video for "Fog's Kiss" was created to promote the album but was never used until the band provided Century Media with it to promote the reissue.

== Critical reception ==
Professional ratings
Review scores
Source	Rating
Chronicles of Chaos	8/10
Sputnikmusic	4/5 stars
Metal Temple	8/10

The album has received positive reviews from music critics, and is widely considered an often-overlooked classic in the genre. Chronicles of Chaos wrote that "On their first full-length offering, Sacramentum fix most of the mistakes they made on Finis Malorum. They praised the "intricacy" of the album, as well as the variety, noting that "the songs on this offering vary often, switching riffs every couple of times that they're played. In some cases, this amounts to nothing more than a change of key or a different drum beat, but it does help to keep the album from getting boring too quickly. Overall, I was a little disappointed by this album, but I did have high hopes for it, and it nearly delivered. I'd recommended it for Dissection and melodic black metal fans." Writing for Sputnikmusic, Adam Thomas praised the album, and lamented that the band is frequently overlooked. Thomas particularly praised Niklas Rudolfsson's drumming, writing that "his breakneck drumming is the focal point of all the songs from the get go. His frenetic yet inventive style melds perfectly into the spiderweb-like arrangements." He also added that "The speed and precision of the guitarists along with their knack for harmonic structures conveys more than the desolate mood that is reflected by most bands of the era, it creates the forceful state of anger and discourse that makes Far Away From the Sun unique", calling it "a shining example of the genre". Metal Crypt wrote that "this album in particular has an unexplainable aura about it, not dissimilar to the aura of either of the classic Dissection albums, intangible and inexplicable, but most certainly there. Almost as if some vast dark presence was present during the album recording sessions (no; not Barry White) and captured forevermore in sonic form. This, when coupled with some truly incredible music played by talented musicians, gives them the edge over the multitude of lifeless pastiches wanting nothing more but to be the next big thing." Metal Temple wrote that "Fog’s Kiss" is "one of the reasons "Far Away From The Sun" is looked upon as a legendary release, truly monumental."

== Legacy ==
Metal Injection named them as one of the most important bands in 'blackened melodic death metal' history, writing that – along with Dawn, Unanimated, and Vinterland – "these bands embody all the best things about metal: catchy riffs and great songwriting, effective use of melody to create a narrative structure, vocals soaked in reverb, and all the brutality one needs without resorting to cheesiness or self-parody." When the album was reissued in 2012, Steffen Kummerer of Obscura named it his fourth favourite album of the year.

== Track listing ==
All tracks are written by Sacramentum.

No.	Title	Length
1.	"Fog's Kiss"	4:47
2.	"Far Away from the Sun"	5:13
3.	"Blood Shall Be Spilled"	4:42
4.	"When Night Surrounds Me"	6:04
5.	"Cries from a Restless Soul"	5:10
6.	"Obsolete Tears"	4:40
7.	"Beyond All Horizons"	6:32
8.	"The Vision and the Voice"	4:41
9.	"Outro – Darkness Falls for Me / Far Away from the Sun (Part Two)"	4:10
Total length:		45:59

== Credits ==
- Nisse Karlén – vocals, bass, lyrics
- Anders Brolyke – guitars, lyrics (track 5)
- Nicklas Rudolfsson – drums, lyrics (track 3)
- Kristian Wåhlin (Necrolord) – cover artwork
- Dan Swanö – engineering, remastering
- Nora Dirkling – reissue layout
