= Confessions of the Maker =

Studio album by Crystal Eyes
- Released: 2005
- Genre: Power metal
- Label: Heavy Fidelity

Crystal Eyes chronology
Vengeance Descending (2003)	Confessions of the Maker (2005)	Dead City Dreaming (2006)

Confessions of the Maker is the fourth studio album by Swedish band Crystal Eyes, released in 2005 by Heavy Fidelity. It is their first album to not have Mikael Dahl on vocals.

== Track listing ==
No.	Title	Length
1.	"The Charioteer"	4:30
2.	"Confessions of the Maker"	5:50
3.	"Northern Rage"	4:49
4.	"The Fools' Ballet"	3:44
5.	"The Terror"	7:43
6.	"Panic"	3:44
7.	"White Wolves"	4:30
8.	"The Burning Vision"	5:03
9.	"Revolution in the Shadowland"	4:30
10.	"Terminal Voyage"	4:47
11.	"Silent Angel"	5:25
Total length:		54:35

== Personnel ==
- Daniel Heiman - Vocals
- Mikael Dahl - Guitar
- Jonathan Nyberg - Guitar
- Claes Wikander - Bass Guitar
- Stefan Svantesson - Drums

=== Credits ===
- Production, recording, and mixing by Mikael Dahl and Claes Wikander at Crystal Sounds
- Drums recorded by Andy LaRocque
- Mastering by Dragan Tanaskovic
- Cover artwork and logotype by Mattias Norén
