= Dead City Dreaming =

Studio album by Crystal Eyes
- Released: 2006
- Genre: Heavy metal
- Label: Heavy Fidelity

Crystal Eyes chronology
| Confessions of the Maker (2003) | Dead City Dreaming (2006) | Chained (2008) |

Dead City Dreaming is Crystal Eyes' fifth album released in 2006 by Heavy Fidelity. The first track, Dead City Dreaming, concerns the Cthulhu Mythos.

== Track listing ==
1. "Dead City Dreaming" – 4:43
2. "Into the Light" – 3:42
3. "The Narrow Mind" – 4:06
4. "Wall of Stars" – 4:58
5. "Battlefield" – 4:14
6. "The Quest Remains" – 3:28
7. "Dawn Dancer" – 4:27
8. "Roads of Loneliness" – 3:55
9. "Temple of Immortal Shame" – 4:23
10. "The Halls of Valhalla" – 7:19

== Credits ==
- Søren Nico Adamsen – Vocals
- Mikael Dahl – Guitar
- Niclas Karsson – Guitar
- Claes Wikander – Bass Guitar
- Stefan Svantesson – Drums
- Production and recording by Mikael Dahl at Crystal Sounds
- Mixing by Fredrik Nordström
- Mastering by Göran Finnberg
- Cover artwork by Mattias Norén

== Reception ==
Metal Reviews gave the album a positive review, saying "Without a doubt, this is the best material that I've heard from the band to date." Last Rites was similarly positive, praising the album as "the perfect escape for those looking for some toe-tapping, uplifting heavy metal". However, the website was critical of some of its songs, stating that they "feature[d] the kind of cringe-worthy lyrics that really make you wish some of these bands would sing in their native tongues".
