= Grotesque (band) =

Swedish death metal/black metal band

- Origin: Gothenburg, Sweden
- Genres: Death metal, black metal
- Years active: 1988–1990, 1996, 2007
- Past members: Tomas Lindberg; Kristian Wåhlin (Necrolord); Insultor; Per Nordgren; Offensor; Alf Svensson; Nuctemeron; Shamaatae

Grotesque was a Swedish death metal/black metal band.

== History ==
Former members of Conquest, Kristian Wåhlin (Necrolord) and Per Nordgren (Virgintaker), formed the band in Gothenburg, Sweden in September 1988, with the addition of Tomas Lindberg (Goatspell). The band was short-lived and recorded a few demos and an EP. The band's original drummer, Shamaatae, formed black metal band Arckanum in 1993. After the demise of Grotesque, Lindberg and Svensson started At the Gates. Necrolord founded the band Liers in Wait and focused on creating artwork for several bands, including Dissection and Emperor. In 1996, Goatspell, Necrolord, and Offensor reunited and recorded two songs for a compilation album, which was later re-released as a split album with At the Gates EP Gardens of Grief.

Grotesque reformed in 2007 for a single, invite-only concert on January 26 in Stockholm, to celebrate Daniel Ekeroth's book, Swedish Death Metal. Nirvana 2002 and Interment also reunited for the concert.

== Members ==
- Tomas Lindberg (Goatspell) - Vocals (1988–1990, 1996, 2007, died 2025)
- Kristian Wåhlin (Necrolord) - Guitar (1988–1990, 1996, 2007)
- Insultor - Guitar (2007)
- Per Nordgren (Virgintaker) - Bass (1988, 2007)
- Tomas Eriksson (Offensor) - Drums (1989–1990, 1996, 2007)
- Alf Svensson - Guitar (1990)
- Nuctemeron - Bass (1988–1989)
- Shamaatae - Drums (1988–1989)

== Discography ==
- Ripped from the Cross (demo, 1988)
- The Black Gate Is Closed (demo, 1989)
- Incantation (EP, 1990)
- In the Embrace of Evil (compilation, 1996)
