= Servants of Darkness =

Studio album by Nifelheim
- Released: 2000
- Recorded: 11–25 March 2000 at Maestro Musik in Gothenburg, Sweden
- Genre: Black metal; speed metal
- Label: Black Sun
- Producer: Christoffer Wallin

Nifelheim chronology
Devil's Force (1997)	Servants of Darkness (2000)	Envoy of Lucifer (2007)

Servants of Darkness is the third album by Swedish black metal band Nifelheim. It was released in 2000 on CD (first 1000 came with a slipcase), LP (only 1000 copies, 200 on golden vinyl) and on cassette by Rockor Disc in Romania.

== Track listing ==
1. "Evil Blasphemies" – 3:17
2. "Sadistic Blood Massacre" – 2:50
3. "Black Evil" – 2:16
4. "The Bestial Avenger" – 5:17
5. "War of Doom (Armageddon)" – 4:16
6. "Servants of Darkness" – 3:50
7. "Infernal Desolation" – 3:27
8. "Into the Morbid Black" – 5:07
9. "Sacrifice to the Lord of Darkness" – 4:20

== Personnel ==
- Hellbutcher: vocals
- Demon: lead and rhythm guitars
- Tyrant: lead, rhythm and bass guitars
- Devastator: drums, percussion
