= Moons and Mushrooms =

Studio album by Lake of Tears
- Released: April 26, 2007
- Recorded: November 2006 – February 2007 at Studiomega and Greenfields Studios
- Genre: Gothic metal
- Length: 40:28
- Label: Dockyard 1
- Producers: Christian Silver, Lake of Tears

Lake of Tears chronology
Black Brick Road (2004)	Moons and Mushrooms (2007)	Illwill (2011)

Moons and Mushrooms is the seventh studio album by the gothic metal band Lake of Tears. It was released in 2007, and was the first Lake of Tears recording to feature Magnus Sahlgren as an official member of the band (although he had played guitar with Lake of Tears as a guest artist since 1999). Unlike the band's previous two albums, Moons and Mushrooms made heavy use of guitars, having a less electronic sound. A limited edition digipack version of the album was released alongside the standard version, featuring a cover of the Status Quo song "Is There a Better Way?" as a bonus track.

== Critical reception ==
Kostas Sarampalis of Chronicles of Chaos rated it a 9 out of 10.

== Track listing ==
All songs written by Lake of Tears, except "Head on Phantom", written by Christian Silver and Lake of Tears, and "Is There a Better Way" by Francis Rossi and Alan Lancaster.

No.	Title	Length
1.	"Last Purple Sky"	06:02
2.	"You Better Breathe While There's Still Time"	04:12
3.	"Waiting Counting"	04:39
4.	"Like a Leaf"	05:05
5.	"Children of the Grey"	04:33
6.	"Head on Phantom"	04:28
7.	"Island Earth"	05:04
8.	"Planet of the Penguins"	06:25
9.	"Is There a Better Way" (Status Quo cover) (digipack edition bonus track)	03:50
Total length:		44:18

== Personnel ==
- Daniel Brennare - vocals, guitar
- Mikael Larsson - bass
- Johan Oudhuis - drums
- Magnus Sahlgren - lead guitar

=== Additional personnel ===
- Andreas Olavi - guitars
- Dan Helgeson - organ, keyboards
- Christian Silver - producer, engineering
- Felipe Machado Franco - cover art, artwork
- Fredrik Olsson - photography
- Anton Hedberg - photography
- Johan Örnborg - engineering
