= In Silence They March =

Studio album by Crystal Eyes
- Released: 1999
- Genre: Power metal
- Label: Heavy Fidelity

Crystal Eyes chronology
World of Black and Silver (1999)	In Silence They March (1999)	Vengeance Descending (2003)

In Silence They March is Swedish power metal band Crystal Eyes' second album, released in 2000 by Crazy Life Music. It was released again in 2005 under Crystal Eyes' new label, Heavy Fidelity.

== Critical reception ==
A review in MetalReviews.com said: "I think Crystal Eyes are talented enough to make much better than the 2 albums that they've done so far.... unfortunately something is missing."

A review in Vampster described tha album as "a perfectly executed CD, sung at a high level".

== Track listing ==
1. "Time Flight" - 6:17
2. "Cursed and Damned" - 4:44
3. "Sons of Odin" - 6:22
4. "The Grim Reaper's Fate" - 5:10
5. "The Undead King" - 1:32
6. "In Silence They March" - 5:49
7. "Adrian Blackwood" - 5:15
8. "Witch Hunter" - 6:16
9. "The Rising" - 4:25
10. "Knights of Prey" - 5:12
11. "Somewhere Over the Sun" - 4:55
12. "Winternight" - 6:20

== Personnel ==
- Mikael Dahl – vocals, guitar
- Jonathan Nyberg – guitar
- Claes Wikander – bass guitar
- Kujtim Gashi – drums

Production, recording, mixing, and mastering by Crystal Eyes and Detlef Mohrmann.
