= In the Embrace of Evil =

Compilation album by Grotesque
- Released: 1996
- Recorded: Pagan Studios (November 1989); Sunlight Studios (August 1990); Berno Studio (March 1996)
- Genre: Death metal, black metal
- Length: 48:57
- Label: Black Sun

Grotesque chronology
Incantation (1990)	In the Embrace of Evil (1996)

In the Embrace of Evil is a compilation album by Swedish death metal band Grotesque. The album was re-released as a split CD with At the Gates' Gardens of Grief EP by Century Media in 2001. It was given a rating of three and a half stars by AllMusic.

Tracks 2, 3, 7, 8, and 9 are remixed songs taken from the Incantation EP. Tracks 1, 4, 5, and 6 are remastered songs from the never released In the Embrace of Evil demo. Tracks 10 and 11 were recorded by Tomas Lindberg, Alf Svensson, and Kristian Wåhlin in 1996 specially for this release.

== Track listing ==
1. "Thirteen Bells of Doom" (2:25)
2. "Blood Runs from the Altar" (4:26)
3. "Submit to Death" (3:28)
4. "Fall into Decay" (4:47)
5. "Seven Gates" (2:04)
6. "Angels Blood" (7:36)
7. "Nocturnal Blasphemies" (4:37)
8. "Spawn of Azathoth" (2:38)
9. "Incantation" (7:21)
10. "Church of the Pentagram" (5:25)
11. "Ripped from the Cross" (4:14)
