= World of Black and Silver =

Studio album by Crystal Eyes
- Released: 1999
- Genre: Power metal
- Label: Heavy Fidelity

Crystal Eyes chronology
World of Black and Silver (1999)	In Silence They March (2000)

World of Black and Silver is Crystal Eyes' first album released in 1999 by Crazy Life Music. Released again in 2005 under Crystal Eyes' new label, Heavy Fidelity.

== Track listing ==
1. "Interstellar War" - 4:59
2. "Gods of the World" - 3:55
3. "Winds of the Free" - 4:49
4. "The Power Behind the Throne" - 6:18
5. "The Dragon's Lair" - 4:59
6. "Eyes of the Forest Gloom" - 7:11
7. "Rage on the Sea" - 7:01
8. "Victims of the Frozen Hate" - 5:30
9. "Extreme Paranoia" - 3:31
10. "Glory Ride" - 5:06
11. "World of Black and Silver" - 5:24

== Credits ==
- Mikael Dahl - Vocals and Guitar
- Jonathan Nyberg - Guitar
- Claes Wikander - Bass Guitar
- Kujtim Gashi - Drums

Production, recording, mixing, and mastering by Crystal Eyes and Detlef Mohrmann.
