= Thulcandra (band) =

German black metal band

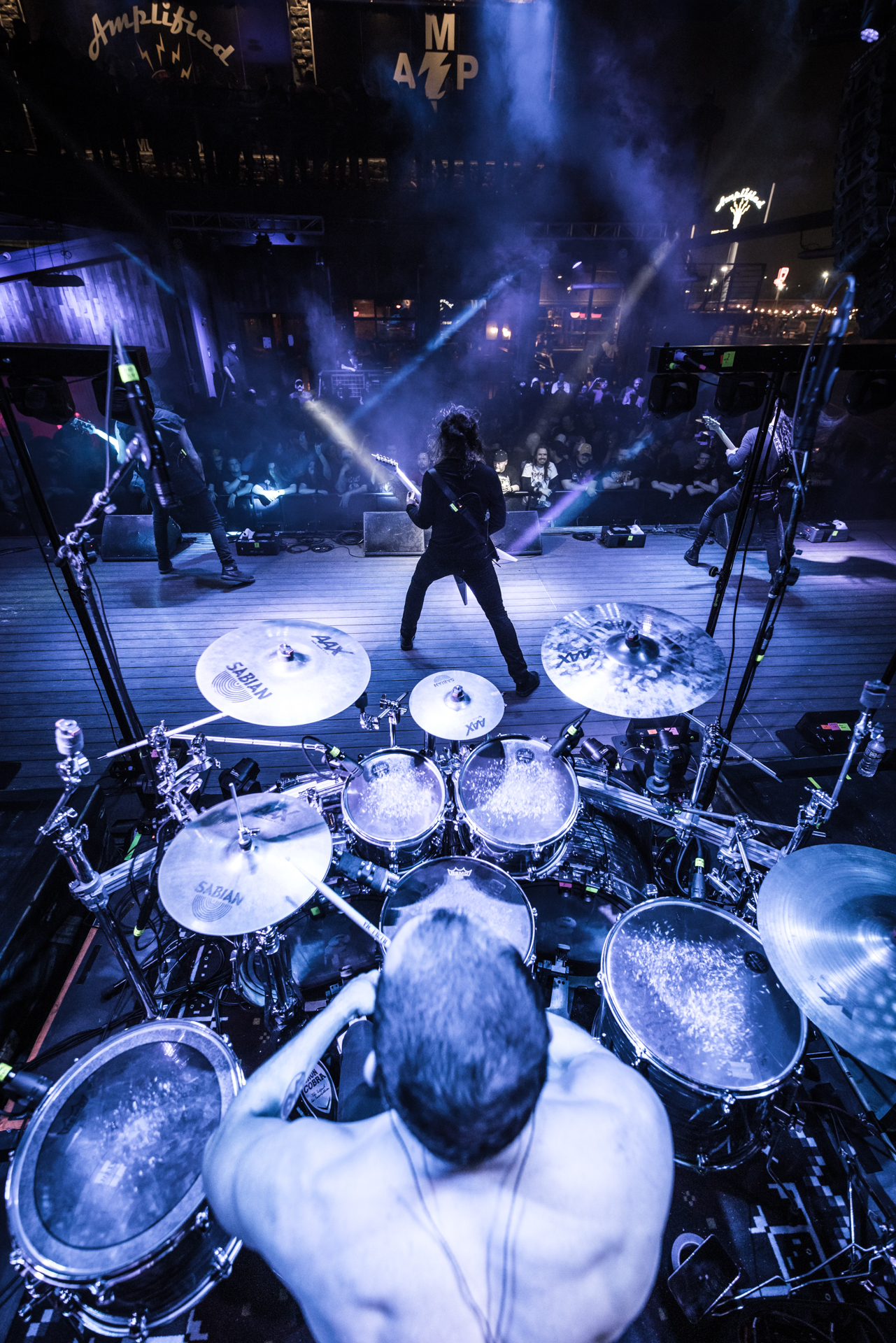
- Thulcandra performing in Dallas, Texas, USA 11.03.2023

Background information
- Origin: Munich, Germany
- Genre: Melodic black-death
- Years active: 2003–2005; 2008–present
- Label: Napalm Records
- Spinoff of: Obscura
- Members: Steffen Kummerer; Alessandro Delastik; Mariano Delastik; Carsten Schorn
- Website: thetruethulcandra.com

Thulcandra is a German melodic black/death metal band from Munich. They have released five full-length studio albums, one demo, one EP, three books and six music videos to date. Their latest album Hail the Abyss was released in 2023 through Napalm Records. The band's style is described as melodic black metal and inspired by bands such as Dissection, Sacramentum, and Unanimated.

== History ==
Thulcandra's rise to power ignited when the Germany-based outfit unleashed their debut album, Fallen Angel's Dominion, upon metaldom in 2010. The group, still fronted by founding member and visionary Steffen Kummerer (also of Obscura fame), have only tightened their hibernal grip on blackened death metal since. The desolate melodic emanations in follow-up albums Under a Frozen Sun (2011), Ascension Lost (2015), A Dying Wish (2021) and Hail The Abyss (2023) solidified Thulcandra as a superior force, expertly thrusting the magic and mystery of mid-'90s Nordic black-death metal into the modern era.

Founded by Kummerer, Jürgen Zintz (guitars), and Jonas Baumgartl (drums) in Landshut in 2003, Thulcandra's mandate was clear. The trio's affinity for dark, aggressive, and mellifluent metal had to come out. Two years later, the first and only demo Perishness Around Us emerged, with tracks like "Frozen Kingdom" and "Immortality" demonstrating Thulcandra's intrinsic potentiality. However, tragedy inside the band forced the Germans to go on a three-year hiatus. Only when Kummerer, who was also emergent with Obscura, revisited Perishness Around Us did he realize that Thulcandra needn't be on ice. He restored Thulcandra, enlisting twin brothers Tobias and Sebastian Ludwig on bass and guitar, respectively. Indeed, the black horizons of Thulcandra's new material served as the perfect foil for Kummerer's progressive metal predilections in Obscura.

The name of the band is taken from a 1989 demo of the Norwegian act Darkthrone, coming from the 1938 science fiction novel Out of the Silent Planet by C. S. Lewis, where Thulcandra is the name for the silent planet, Earth.

Fallen Angel's Dominion (2010)

A multi-album deal with Austrian label Napalm Records was struck after Kummerer served up a promo containing "Night Eternal," "Fallen Angel's Dominion," and "Frozen Kingdom." From there, Thulcandra wrote four more tracks, including the lighthouse track "Spirit of the Night," to complete the record, Fallen Angel's Dominion, co-produced by V. Santura (Obscura, Dark Fortress, Triptykon) and Kummerer at Woodshed Studios. Dark Fortress drummer Matthias "Seraph" Landes sat in for the recordings. At the same time, illustrator Kristian "Necrolord" Wåhlin (Dissection, Dark Tranquillity, Emperor) was on-boarded for his trademark downhearted blue cover art style. Martin Loga of Powermetal.de called Fallen Angel's Dominion "black metal with class."

Under A Frozen Sun (2011)

Kummerer and team took less than a year to return with Under a Frozen Sun. Written while receiving acclaim for Obscura's sophomore album, Cosmogenesis. Thulcandra's response was bleaker and more aggressive, but still musical, with Landes now firmly in the drum position full-time. The combo of Santura and Kummerer at the production helm returned, as did Wåhlin for another blue-hued album cover. When Under a Frozen Sun was released in the fall of 2011, fans and critics praised the album, with Rock Hard's Björn Thorsten Jaschinski extolling Thulcandra's craftsmanship. Tracks like "In Blood and Fire," "Aeon of Darkness," and video single "The Second Fall" proved the Germans were highlights.

Ascension Lost (2015)

Thulcandra spent time on the European festival circuit at shows such as Metal Invasion 2011 and Bavarian Battle Winter 2011. Confident of their live show, they embarked on their first-ever European tour with Abigail Williams in support of Under a Frozen Sun in 2012. Over the next several years, Thulcandra wrote surreptitiously and performed at the Baden in Blut Festival 2013, Dark Easter Metal Meeting 2014, and Party.San Metal Open Air 2014. Concurrently, Obscura was receiving worldwide attention, leaving Kummerer to put Thulcandra on temporary hold. When Obscura's tour commitments dwindled, the trio — Landes returned in a session capacity — could finally focus on Thulcandra's much-anticipated third album.

Ascension Lost was, by and large, a different from its predecessors. Very much in the spirit of the movements that influenced Thulcandra, the album — spearheaded by "The First Rebellion", "The Second Fall", and lead single "Exalted Resistance" — featured a more refined approach. The riffs and solos of Kummerer were strong, but it's the foundation that offered up more groove, a learned trait from ally Tom G. Warrior (Triptykon, Celtic Frost). "Throne of Will" exemplified Ascension Lost's newly concentrated form. Produced by Kummerer at his Klangfabrik Landshut studio, Thulcandra's third opus was then mixed and mastered by Santura. Not one to break tradition, Wåhlin wielded the cover art again in blue. Metal Hammer's Martin Wickler called Ascension Lost, "A flawless homage to the Swedish legends of the early nineties."

Thulcandra toured hard in support of Ascension Lost. In Europe, the group appeared in prime slots at prestigious festivals such as Metal Embrace Festival 2015, Ragnarök Festival 2015, Kaltenbach Open Air 2016, and Schlachtfest XVIII while crossing the continent with Secrets of the Moon, Dødheimsgard, and Hellsaw to widespread acclaim. In 2017, Sebastian and Tobias Ludwig departed after nearly a decade with Thulcandra. Kummerer replaced the duo with brothers Mariano "M." Delastik (guitars) and Alessandro "Erebor" Delastik (drums), both of black metallers Haradwaith. The newly reconfigured three-piece ensconced on Thulcandra's first European headline tour with death metallers Nailed to Obscurity.

A Dying Wish (2021)

Thulcandra found a permanent bassist in Hailstone guitarist Chris Kratzer. The group then commenced work on the follow-up to Ascension Lost. To keep the band's sound tight, they plunged into a successful 21-date European tour with Obscura, God Dethroned, and Fractal Universe in early 2020. Months later, disaster struck Thulcandra again, however. Kratzer, who had been in the band for less than a year, was killed in an accident. Gutted and with the global pandemic raging, Kummerer tried to pick up the pieces. In Kratzer's honor, Kummerer and the Delastik brothers continued on, completing A Dying Wish in 2021.

Front-lined by singles "Funeral Pyre," "Nocturnal Heresy," "Scarred Grandeur," and the title track, A Dying Wish signified Thulcandra's latest chapter, one marked by an increased infusion of traditional heavy metal against a backdrop of melodic blackened death metal. The group changed up the artwork — this time illustrated by German artist Herbert Lochner — and pulled in famed producer Dan Swanö (Dissection, Bloodbath, Opeth) and his studio, Unisound, to get something new out of their fourth album. A Dying Wish was also recorded at FiveLakes Tonstudio (Lunar Aurora, Craven Idol) and Kummerer's Klangfabrik Landshut. Thulcandra's approachc was to create something distinctly old-school but without the trappings of it. From opener "Funeral Pyre" and to the mid-album rager "The Slivering Silver" to "Scarred Grandeur" and the epic title track, Thulcandra showed their craftsmanship, as the group's entry into the Official German Album Charts at #94 confirmed. Writer Dom Lawson of Blabbermouth stated A Dying Wish "rips and terrorizes with the intensity of a debut."

In support of A Dying Wish, Thulcandra toured Europe with fellow death metallers, The Spirit, in early 2021, followed by North America on their first-ever tour with Fleshgod Apocalypse, Obscura, and Wolfheart in the winter of 2023.

Hail The Abyss (2023)

Meanwhile, Thulcandra were also readying their follow-up to A Dying Wish titled, Hail the Abyss. They again worked with Swanö, who handled the mix, as well as Lochner for the cover art. Fans saw Hail the Abyss released by long-time partner Napalm Records in spring 2023. In July 2024, Thulcandra announced their first headlining tour within the United Kingdom. In January 2025, the band went on a 13 date lasting co-headlining tour along Swedish Black Metal band Sacramentum within the European Union. Additionally, Thulcandra announced their first headlining Mexican tour, called "Hail The Mexican Abyss Tour 2025", covering four major cities in the country within March 2025. Furthermore, the band announced an Asian tour, covering Japan, Indonesia, Singapore and more shows in South East Asia for July 2025. The tour was named "Hail The Abyss Asia 2025", and began in July 2025.

== Members ==
=== Current members ===
- Steffen Kummerer – vocals, guitars (2003–2005, 2008–present); bass (2003–2005)
- Alessandro Delastik – drums (2014–present)
- Mariano Delastik – guitars (2018–present)
- Carsten Schorn – bass (2020–present)

=== Former members ===
- Jürgen Zintz – guitars (2003–2005; died 2005)
- Jonas Baumgartl – drums (2003–2005)
- Seraph – drums (2008–2015)
- Sebastian Ludwig – guitars (2008–2017)
- Tobias Ludwig – bass (2008–2017)
- Christian Kratzer – bass (2018–2020; died 2020)

== Discography ==
=== Studio albums ===
- Fallen Angel's Dominion (2010)
- Under a Frozen Sun (2011)
- Ascension Lost (2015)
- A Dying Wish (2021)
- Hail the Abyss (2023)

=== Demo ===
- Perishness Around Us (2005)

=== Live albums ===
- Live Demise (2024)

=== Music videos ===
- "The Second Fall" (2015)
- "Funeral Pyre" (2021)
- "Nocturnal Heresy" (2021)
- "A Dying Wish" (2021)
- "As I Walk Through The Gateway" (2023)
- "Hail The Abyss" (2023)

=== Books ===
- The Essentials of Thulcandra - Official Tablature Book (2023)
- Fallen Angel's Dominion - The Complete Guitar & Bass Transcriptions (2024)
- Under a Frozen Sun - The Complete Guitar & Bass Transcriptions (2024)
- A Dying Wish - The Complete Guitar & Bass Transcriptions (2026)
