= Apocalyptic (album) =

Studio album by Evocation
- Released: 29 October 2010, 9 November 2010 (North America)
- Recorded: Recorded at Evocation Studio
- Genres: Death metal, Melodic Death Metal
- Length: 39:24
- Labels: Metal Blade Records, Cyclone Empire Records
- Producer: Vesa Kenttäkumpu

Evocation chronology
Dead Calm Chaos (2008)	Apocalyptic (2010)	Illusions of Grandeur (2012)

Professional ratings
Review scores
Source	Rating
AllMusic	3.5/5 stars
About.com	4.5/5 stars
Blistering	7.5/10 stars
Metal Storm	8.5/10 stars
Metal Underground	3/5 stars
Metal Temple	9/10 stars

Apocalyptic is the third studio album by Swedish death metal band Evocation. It was released on 29 October 2010 through Cyclone Empire Records and in North America on 9 November 2010 through Metal Blade Records.

== Track listing ==
No.	Title	Length
1.	"Sweet Obsession"	4:23
2.	"We Are Unified Insane"	3:41
3.	"Infamy"	4:48
4.	"Parasites"	3:27
5.	"Reunion In War"	3:49
6.	"Psychosis Warfare"	3:19
7.	"Murder In Passion"	3:48
8.	"It Is All Your Fault"	3:27
9.	"Curse on the Creature"	4:14
10.	"Apocalyptic"	4:28
Total length:		39:24

== Personnel ==
=== Evocation ===
- Janne Kenttäkumpu Bodén – drums, backing vocals
- Martin Toresson – bass
- Thomas Josefsson – vocals
- Vesa Kenttäkumpu – guitars
- Marko Palmén – guitars

=== Miscellaneous staff ===
- Anton Hedberg – photography
- Michael Xaay Loranc – cover art, layout, artwork
- Kristian Wåhlin – logo
- Christian Silver – mastering
- Vesa Kenttäkumpu – recording, mixing, production, engineering
- Roberto Laghi – production (drums)
