= Mystifier =

Brazilian black metal band

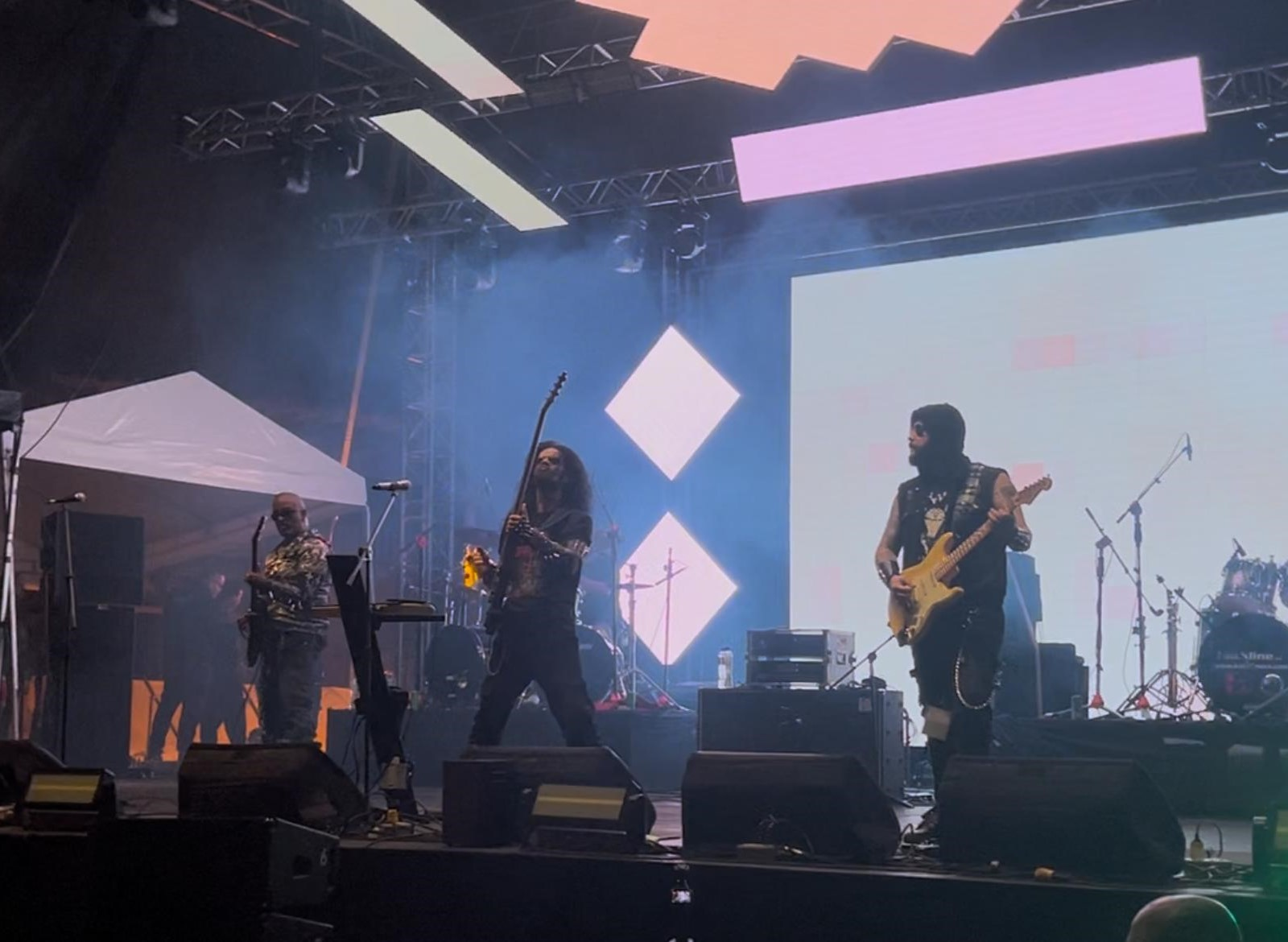
- Mystifier concert in El Carmen de Viboral, Antioquia, Colombia

Background information
- Origin: Salvador, Brazil
- Genres: Black metal, death metal
- Years active: 1989 - Present
- Labels: Osmose Productions, Season of Mist
- Members: Beelzeebubth; Sorcerer Do'Urden; Betto Apophis; Kaverna
- Website: www.mystifier.com.br

Mystifier is a Brazilian black metal band from Salvador, Bahia, formed in 1989.

== History ==
Mystifier released two demos and an EP between 1989 and 1991, and in 1992, signed with the record label Heavy Metal Maniac Records. Their debut album was also released by Osmose Productions. While their early albums were published by both Heavy Metal Maniac and Osmose Productions, their most recent album, Protogoni Mavri Magiki Dynasteia, was released through the French label Season of Mist.

Mystifier's 1996 track "Give the Human Devil His Due" is featured on the soundtrack to the 1997 movie Gummo.

== Musical style ==
AllMusic described the sound as "corrosive, hyper-speed, symphonic-tinged black metal."

== Discography ==
- Tormenting The Holy Trinity - 1989 (Demo)
- T.E.A.R. (The Evil Ascension Returns) - 1990 (EP, Maniac Records)
- Aleister Crowley – 1991 (Demo)
- Wicca – 1992 (LP, Heavy Metal Maniac Records)
- Göetia – 1993 (LP, Osmose Productions)
- The World Is So Good That Who Made It Doesn't Live Here – 1996 (LP, Osmose Productions)
- Demystifying The Mystified Ones For A Decade In The Earthly Paradise – 1999 (EP, Demise Records)
- The Fourth Evil Calling From The Abyss (Tormenting The Holy Trinity) – 2000 (Compilation, Eldritch Music)
- Profanus – 2001 (LP, Encore Records)
- Goëtia & Wicca – 2001 (Compilation, Osmose Productions)
- Baphometic Goat Worship – 2008 (Compilation, Nuclear War Now! Productions)
- 25 Years Of Blasphemy and War – 2014 (Compilation, Dunkelheit Produktionen)
- Protogoni Mavri Magiki Dynasteia – 2019 (LP, Season of Mist)
- The Sign Of The Unholy Baphomet – 2020 (Compilation, Urtod Void)
- T.E.A.R. (The Evil Ascension Returns) / Tormenting the Holy Trinity – 2021 (Compilation, Nuclear War Now! Productions)

== Members ==
- Beelzeebubth – Guitar, Vocals
- Sorcerer Do'Urden – Bass, Vocals, Keyboards
- Betto Apophis – Drums
- Kaverna – Guitar, Vocals

=== Past members ===
- Lucifuge Rofocale – Drums
- Behemoth – Guitar
- Meugninousouan – Vocals
- Astaroth – Guitar
- Arnaldo Asmoodeus – Vocals, Keyboards
- Zé Luiz – Keyboards
- Paulo Lisboa – Guitar
- Louis Bear – Drums
- Thony D'Assys – Guitar
- Brunno Rheys – Bass
- Leandro Kastyphas – Keyboards
- Sathanael – Vocals
- Alex Rocha – Drums
- Bhruno Brittus – Guitar
- Thiago Nogueira – Drums
- Leviathan – Vocals
- Tiago Shade – Drums
- Yuri Hamayano – Drums
- Renato Corpse – Drums
- Eduardo "Warmonger" Amoris – Drums
