= Arckanum =

Swedish black metal band

- Origin: Dalarna, Sweden
- Genre: Black metal
- Years active: 1992–2018, 2026–present
- Spinoff of: Grotesque
- Members: Johan "Shamaatae" Lahger
- Past members: Sataros; Loke Svarteld

Arckanum is a Swedish black metal band formed in 1992 by Johan Lahger, who is the only constant member. Arckanum is influential and popular in the Swedish black metal scene.

Lahger writes occult literature as Vexior/Ekortu. His first published work, Panparadox, was released 13 July 2009 by Ixaxaar. His second book, Gullveigarbók, was released in December 2010 by Fall of Man. His third book, Þursakyngi, was published on 21 December 2014. It is said to be a "book series", with each book dedicated to the Thursatru tradition. As of 2018, he has published multiple books with more to come. He put the band on hold to write. He reformed the band in 2026.

== History ==
Lahger's his first band, Conquest, evolved into Grotesque. After leaving Grotesque, Lahger formed technical death metal band Disinterment, which recorded one demo and played a few shows before splitting up. At the end of 1992, Lahger returned to black metal and started Arckanum. Initially a full band, it became a solo project after six months. After several releases, by 1998 Lahger had discontinued working with Necropolis Records and turned to writing books about Pan, Old Norse traditions, runic witchcraft and anti-cosmic Satanism/chaos-gnosticism.

He remained involved in music, working with Arckanum and playing drums with The Hearsemen. Arckanum's album ÞÞÞÞÞÞÞÞÞÞÞ was released on 1 June 2009. Antikosmos and ÞÞÞÞÞÞÞÞÞÞÞ featured the guest appearance by Set Teitan of Dissection and Watain. Lahger released three more full lengths and several EPs and splits before recording Arckanum's final album, Den förstfödde, released on 29 September 2017 through Folter Records, who re-released the band's entire catalogue.

Arckanum split up in 2018. Lahger focused on writing. On 26 April 2019, Folter Records released Första trulen, an EP containing the remixed and remastered recordings that were supposed to be the 1994 demo Trulen. Lahger was unhappy with the original recordings and kept the material unreleased until after he disbanded Arckanum.

== Lyrics ==
Arckanum's lyrics deal with the worship of Chaos, as well as anti-cosmic Satanism. Lahger writes lyrics resembling Old Swedish, and has stated that he tries to write his lyrics as grammatically correct possible. In his latest three albums, the language is meant to resemble Old East Norse.

== Discography ==
=== Albums ===
- Fran marder (15 May 1995) Necropolis Records
- Kostogher (20 February 1997) Necropolis
- Kampen (1998) Necropolis
- Antikosmos (21 June 2008) Debemur Morti/Moribund Records
- ÞÞÞÞÞÞÞÞÞÞÞ (29 May 2009) Debemur Morti
- Sviga læ (18 October 2010) Regain Records
- Helvítismyrkr (16 September 2011) Season of Mist
- Fenris Kindir (10 May 2013) Season of Mist
- Den förstfödde (29 September 2017) Folter Records
- Beswærilsin (2026)

=== Demos ===
- Demo '93 (1993)
- Trulen (1994)

=== EPs ===
- Boka vm Kaos (Feb. 2002)
- Kosmos wardhin dræpas om sin / Emptiness Enthralls (Feb. 2003) (split release with Contamino)
- Kaos svarta mar / Skinning the Lambs (14 June 2004) Carnal (split release with Svartsyn)
- Grimalkinz skaldi (13 June 2008)
- Antikosmos (11 April 2008)
- Hadelik (7 September 2008) (split release with Sataros Grief)
- Þyrmir (30 October 2009)
- Första trulen (26 April 2019)
- Motestandarin (22 June 2026)

=== Compilations ===
- Arckanum – The 11 Year Anniversary Album (2004)
- Gava fran trulen (The Demo Years) (2025)
