= Gummo (soundtrack) =

Soundtrack album by various artists
- Released: November 7, 1997
- Genre: Experimental, extreme metal, folk, noise
- Length: 73:44
- Label: Domino; London; Innerstate
- Producer: Randall Poster

Gummo is the soundtrack album to the 1997 film of the same name and contains songs that were recorded specifically for the film or were featured in the film.

The album is mostly made up of various genres of metal, ranging from black metal to grindcore and doom/sludge metal. The soundtrack also includes a few eccentric selections of music which include industrial metal, power electronics, powerviolence, drum and bass, bluegrass, classical and folk selections.

== Track listing ==
1. Absu - "The Gold Torques of Ulaid"
2. Eyehategod - "Serving Time in the Middle of Nowhere"
3. The Electric Hellfire Club - "D.W.S.O.B. (Devil-Worshipping Son of a Bitch)"
4. Spazz - "Gummo Love Theme"
5. Bethlehem - "Schuld Uns'res Knoch'rigen Faltpferd"
6. Burzum - "Rundtgåing av den transcendentale egenhetens støtte"
7. Bathory - "Equimanthorn"
8. Dark Noerd - "Smokin' Husks"
9. Sleep - "Dragonaut"
10. Brujeria - "Matando Güeros 97"
11. Namanax - "The Medicined Man"
12. Nifelheim - "Hellish Blasphemy"
13. Mortician - "Skin Peeler"
14. Mystifier - "Give the Human Devil His Due"
15. Destroy All Monsters - "Mom's and Dad's Pussy"
16. Bethlehem - "Verschleierte Irreligiosität"
17. Mischa Maisky - "Suite No. 2 for Solo Cello in D Minor (Prelude)"
18. Sleep - "Some Grass"
19. Rose Shepherd & Ellen M. Smith - "Jesus Loves Me"

== Other songs included in the film ==
- Burzum - "Rite of Cleansure"
- Almeda Riddle - "My Little Rooster"
- Buddy Holly - "Everyday"
- Madonna - "Like a Prayer"
- Brighter Death Now - "Little Baby"
- Roy Orbison - "Crying"
- Flesh-n-Bone - "Nothing But Da Bone in Me"
- The Hoosier Hotshots - "My Bonnie"
- Ben Webster & Coleman Hawkins - "La Rosita"
