= Nifelheim =

Swedish black metal band

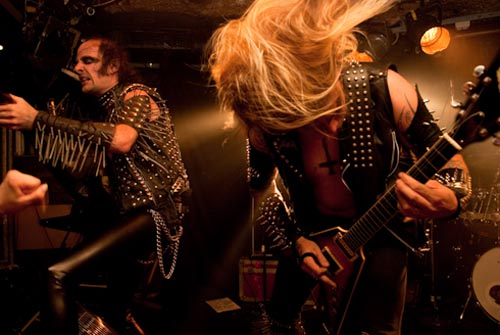
- Nifelheim performing live in 2009

Background information
- Origin: Dals Långed, Sweden
- Genres: Black metal, thrash metal
- Years active: 1990–2022
- Labels: Necropolis, Black Sun, I Hate, Regain
- Members: Hellbutcher; Tyrant; Blackosh; Savage Aggressor
- Past members: Demon (1991–1999); Adrian Erlandsson; Devastator (Martin Axenrot) (1999–2000); Mika “Sadist” Leppänen Apocalyptic Desolator; Vengeance from Beyond; Insulter of Jesus Christ!

Nifelheim was a Swedish black metal band formed in 1990 by twins Erik and Per Gustavsson, under the stage names Tyrant and Hellbutcher. The band is known for their "old school" style of black metal.

== History ==
Nifelheim was founded in 1990 and recorded the demo tape Unholy Death between 1992 and 1993. The band signed to Necropolis Records and recorded the debut album Nifelheim at Studio Fredman. During this period, the band fired guitarist "Morbid Slaughter" for having a girlfriend. After that, John Zwetsloot and Jon Nödtveidt of Dissection joined on guitars. The studio banned the band.

In 1996, the band recorded the Vulcano cover "Witches Sabbat" with guest vocalist Goat (ex-Satanized) for the second Headbangers Against Disco split EP, which also featured Usurper (de) and Unpure, and "Hellish Blasphemy" for the Gummo soundtrack. The latter was re-recorded for the band's second album, Devil's Force, featuring Zweetsloot and Nödtveidt.

After a documentary about heavy metal fans aired in Sweden in 1998, Tyrant and Hellbutcher were nicknamed "Bröderna Hårdrock", which translates to 'The Heavy Metal Brothers' in English.

In 1998, Nifelheim contributed "Die in Fire" to Bathory tribute album In Conspiracy with Satan – A Tribute to Bathory (de). The band left Necropolis Records and recorded Servants of Darkness in March 2000, released through Black Sun Records. In 2001, the band headlined their first concert, at the 2heavy4you festival in Sweden, followed by other concerts in Europe.

== Musical style and ideology ==
Nifelheim plays old-school black metal inspired by bands like Venom, Bathory, Brazilian thrash metal bands Vulcano, Holocausto and Sarcófago and Czech Master's Hammer. The influence of Iron Maiden is also evident in some arrangements.

Niflheim (Old Norse: Niflheimr), in ancient Norse religion, represents the icy realm of the world in the north. It sometimes used metaphorically to refer to the underworld.

The band's lyrics treat Satanism and other topics typical for black metal. Nifelheim believe in traditional metal culture and have expressed disdain for those metal bands who listen to mainstream music or alternative rock. Meanwhile Hellbutcher has been quoted as saying "Just standing there with oily, filthy and torn jeans, looking like old men. I think that’s black metal.", somewhat differentiating his view on what black metal is, in contrast whats commonly considered to be traditional black metal imagery, and their hard-line stance on tradition in metal in general.

== Controversy ==
In a 2008 interview with Sweden Rock magazine, Tyrant was quoted as making derogatory remarks about deceased Metallica bassist Cliff Burton as well as deceased Pantera guitarist Dimebag Darrell Abbott; he stated "I laughed and pissed on a photo of him", and "Too bad Phil Anselmo didn't die too; that was probably the only time I wished Pantera had actually played", about Burton and Abbott, respectively. In a statement released to Blabbermouth.net, the band later verified that they had made and approved the statements before the issue was published.

In a 2010 interview published in Metalion's Slayer (de) fanzine, Tyrant stated that "this 'Dimebag/Burton' fuss... was spammed out as some 'statement' on the internet", and that it disturbed him "more then [sic] ever". Further, he stated that he is "not hating either of these musicians", nor did he intend to "put any disgrace upon their memory". It is unclear if Tyrant was saying the statement was taken out of context, or denying that the statement was ever made. Apparently due to the controversy, that interview has been their last to date. They also mentioned people labeling them as "non-serious" as another reason to not give interviews anymore.

== Members ==
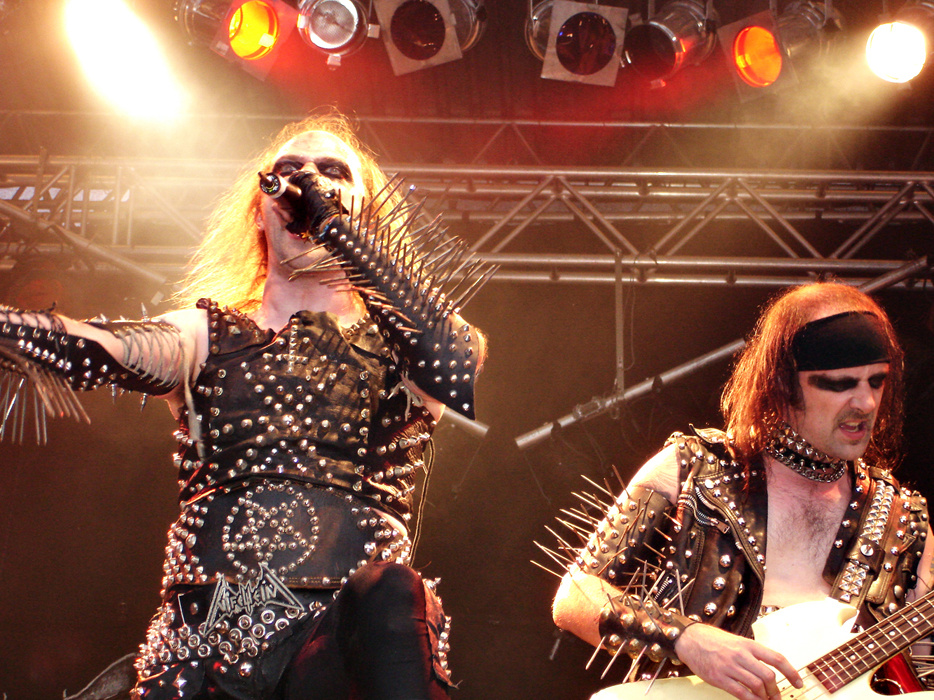
Nifelheim live in 2006

- Hellbutcher (Per "Pelle" Gustavsson) - vocals
- Tyrant (Erik Gustavsson) - bass
- Blackosh (Petr Hošek) - guitar
- Savage Aggressor (Felipe Plaza Kutzbach) - guitar
- Disintegrator (Eric Ljung) - drums

== Discography ==
- 1993 - Unholy Death (demo)
- 1995 - Nifelheim
- 1998 - Devil's Force
- 1997 - Headbangers Against Disco Vol. 2 (split EP with Usurper [de] and Unpure)
- 1997 - "Hellish Blasphemy" on Gummo
- 1998 - "Die in Fire" on In Conspiracy with Satan – A Tribute to Bathory (de)
- 2000 - Servants of Darkness
- 2000 - Unholy Death (EP)
- 2003 - 13 Years (compilation)
- 2006 - Tribute to Slayer Magazine (split EP with Sadistik Exekution)
- 2006 - Thunder Metal (split EP with Vulcano)
- 2007 - Envoy of Lucifer
- 2014 - Satanatas (Vinyl EP)
- 2019 - The Burning Warpath to Hell (Vinyl EP)
