= Tales from the Tomb =

Studio album by Evocation
- Released: 27 April 2007
- Recorded: Recorded, mixed, produced, and engineered in Boras 2006 by Vesa Kenttäkumpu and Evocation. Mastered at Studio Mega in December 2006.
- Genre: Death metal
- Length: 48:02
- Label: Cyclone Empire Records
- Producer: Vesa Kenttäkumpu

Evocation chronology
Evocation (2004)	Tales from the Tomb (2007)	Dead Calm Chaos (2008)

Professional ratings
Review scores
Source	Rating
Metal Underground	4/5 stars
Metal Temple	7/10 stars
Metal.de	8/10 stars

Tales from the Tomb is the first studio album by Swedish death metal band Evocation. It was released on 27 April 2007 through Cyclone Empire Records. The album was made available on CD and vinyl.

== Track listing ==
No.	Title	Length
1.	"Eternal Lie"	00:47
2.	"The Dead"	03:35
3.	"Chronic Hell"	04:07
4.	"Greed"	04:23
5.	"From Menace to Mayhem"	03:38
6.	"Blessed Upon the Altar"	04:01
7.	"Feed the Fire"	05:10
8.	"The Symbols of Sins"	03:44
9.	"Phase of Fear"	04:32
10.	"Veils Were Blown"	04:21
11.	"But Life Goes On"	03:24
12.	"The More We Bleed"	06:20
Total length:		48:02

== Personnel ==
Evocation

- Martin Toresson – bass
- Thomas Josefsson – vocals
- Marko Palmén – guitars
- Vesa Kenttäkumpu – guitars
- Janne Kenttäkumpu Bodén – drums, backing vocals

Guest musicians

- Gustaf Jorde – backing vocals on "Veils Were Blown"

Miscellaneous staff

- Dan Seagrave – artwork, cover art
- Karl-Heinz Schuster – layout
- Kristian Wåhlin – logo
- Johan Örnborg – mastering
- Christian Silver – mastering
- Vesa Kenttäkumpu – production, recording, engineering, mixing
- Anton Hedberg – photography
