= Evocation (band) =

Swedish death metal band

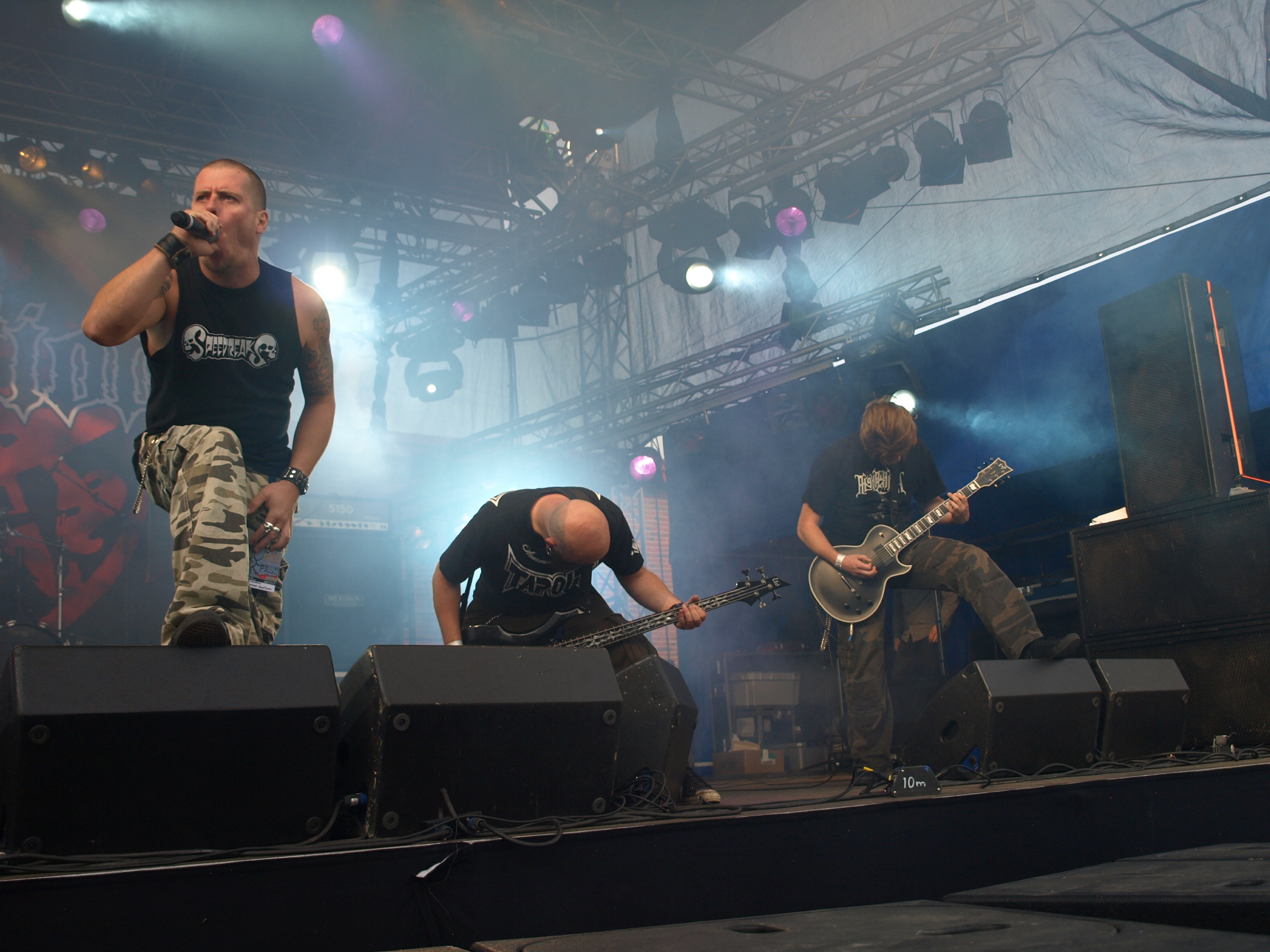
- Evocation in 2008

Background information
- Origin: Borås, Sweden
- Genres: Melodic death metal, death metal (early)
- Years active: 1991–1993, 2005–2019
- Labels: Century Media, Metal Blade, Cyclone Empire
- Members: Marko Palmén; Thomas "Tjompe" Josefsson; Gustaf Jorde; Simon Exner; Janne "Jalomaah" Jaloma
- Past members: Janne Kenttäkumpu Bodén; Vesa Kenttäkumpu; Jani Karvola; Christian "Kricke" Saarinen; Martin "Tore" Toresson; Per Möller-Jensen
- Website: evocation.se

Evocation is a Swedish death metal band from Borås.

== History ==
=== Foundation (1991–1992) ===
Evocation was formed in the autumn of 1991 in Borås by bassist Thomas Josefsson, vocalist Jani Karvola, guitarist Marko Palmén, drummer Janne K. Bodén and guitarist Vesa Kenttäkumpu. A few months later, Evocation parted ways with vocalist Jani Karvola. Thomas Josefsson filled the empty spot as vocalist but stopped playing bass. In 1992, two demos were recorded. The first was recorded at Sunlight Studio with producer Tomas Skogsberg. It resulted in a three track and intro demo limited to 500 copies entitled "The Ancient Gate". Later, in an interview, Skogsberg named Evocation as "the best demo band he ever had recorded". Before the sound recording, Christian "Kricke" Saarinen filled the role as bassist. The second demo contained four tracks and was recorded in a local studio. Both demos gathered cult status within tape trader communities and are now considered true gems from the early years of the Swedish Death Metal scene. After the recordings, Evocation played shows with other death metal bands such as Ceremonial Oath, Dark Tranquillity, Dismember, and Liars in Wait.

=== Breakup (1993–2004) ===
In the beginning of 1993, Evocation had gained a reputation as a ferocious live band and was considered to be one of the most interesting death metal acts from Sweden. Creating their own unique mix of the Gothenburg and Stockholm death metal sound made waves in the death metal scene. Despite the fact that several labels contacted the band, Evocation was put on indefinite hiatus in the autumn of 1993 due to musical differences. In 2001, the band was contacted by Breath of Night Records, and in November 2004, Evocation reformed and the two demos were released worldwide as a full length, self-titled compilation.

=== Tales From the Tomb (2005–2008) ===
In the summer of 2005, Evocation were due to start rehearsing again. Before the reunion, bass player Kricke parted ways with the band, since he "neither had time or energy" to start playing again. Martin "Tore" Toresson was recruited as his replacement in the summer of 2005. After recording a three track demo in 2006, Evocation signed a multi album deal with the German label Cyclone Empire Records in the beginning of 2007. In April 2007, Tales from the Tomb was released. Tales from the Tomb earned massive appraisal all over Europe and was also voted as the 4th "Best album of the year" in 2007 by all journalists of Metal Hammer Germany. In support of the album, Evocation played numerous summer festivals including Wacken Open Air in Finland and Jalometalli Metal Music Festival in Finland.

=== Dead Calm Chaos (2008–2009) ===
In October 2008, Evocation released their second full-length album, Dead Calm Chaos. It was recorded and mixed in the newly built Evocation Studio. Dead Calm Chaos saw guest appearances of Anders Björler, from At The Gates and The Haunted, and Dan Swanö from Bloodbath and Edge of Sanity. The artwork and layout was done by Travis Smith. The album was hailed all over Europe and earned the number 1 position on sound checks in Germany (Legacy Mag) and Sweden (Close-Up). The success also secured Evocation a European tour with Cannibal Corpse, Dying Fetus and Obscura and major summer festival shows such as Summer Breeze Open Air in Germany, Party. San Open Air in Germany, Rock Hard Open Air in Germany & Kaltenbach Open Air in Austria. Evocation also signed with international booking agency Continental Concerts.

=== Apocalyptic (2010–2012) ===
In early 2010, Evocation started to record their third full-length album titled Apocalyptic. For the production of the album the band had been working in Evocation Studio. Drums were produced with Roberto Laghi. Mastering was done at Studio Mega. The cover artwork and layout were done by the Polish artist Xaay. The album was promoted by the band with several touring and festival shows. The European release was scheduled for 29 October through Cyclone Empire Records. Apocalyptic was also licensed in the US & Canada by Metal Blade Records and in Russia by Fono Ltd.

=== Second compilation, Illusions of Grandeur and EP (2012–2019) ===
2012 saw the release of the band's second compilation, Evoked from Demonic Depths – The Early Years, and the band's fourth studio album, Illusions of Grandeur, released in North America on 23 September 2012, and on 24 September 2012 in Europe. An EP containing covers of tracks by Bolt Thrower, Carcass, Napalm Death, Edge of Sanity and At the Gates, titled Excised and Anatomised, was released on 19 August 2013.

=== Indefinite Hiatus (2020–present) ===
On 29 November 2019, the band released a statement via social media announcing that they would be going on an indefinite hiatus at the end of 2019.

== Band members ==
Current

- Marko Palmén – guitars (1991–1993, 2005–present)
- Thomas "Tjompe" Josefsson – vocals (1991–1993, 2005-present)
- Gustaf Jorde – bass (2012–present)
- Simon Exner – guitars (2013–present)
- Janne "Jalomaah" Jaloma – drums (2017–present)

Former

- Janne Kenttäkumpu Bodén – drums (1991–1993, 2005–2013)
- Vesa Kenttäkumpu – guitars (1991–1993, 2005–2013)
- Jani Karvola – vocals (1991)
- Christian "Kricke" Saarinen – bass (1992–1993)
- Martin "Tore" Toresson – bass (2005–2012)
- Per Möller-Jensen – session drums (2016)

== Discography ==
=== Studio albums ===
- Tales from the Tomb (2007)
- Dead Calm Chaos (2008)
- Apocalyptic (2010)
- Illusions of Grandeur (2012)
- The Shadow Archetype (2017)

=== Compilations ===
- Evocation (2004)
- Evoked from Demonic Depths – The Early Years (2012)

=== EPs ===
- Excised and Anatomised (2013)

Demos

- The Ancient Gate (1992)
- Promo 1992 (1992)
- Demo 2006 (2006)
