= Greater Art =

Studio album by Lake of Tears
- Released: September 30, 1994
- Recorded: December 1993 – January 1994
- Studio: Sunlight Studio
- Genres: Doom metal, death-doom
- Length: 34:48
- Label: Black Mark
- Producers: T. Skogsberg, M. Lodmalm, Lake of Tears

Lake of Tears chronology
Greater Art (1994)	Headstones (1995)

Greater Art is the first studio album by the Swedish metal band Lake of Tears. It was released in 1994 with a straightforward doom metal and death metal sound.

== Track listing ==
No.	Title	Length
1.	"Under the Crescent"	3:42
2.	"Eyes of the Sky"	3:44
3.	"Upon the Highest Mountain"	7:08
4.	"As Daylight Yields"	4:00
5.	"Greater Art"	4:51
6.	"Evil Inside"	3:04
7.	"Netherworld"	3:36
8.	"Tears"	4:43
Total length:		34:48

== Personnel ==
- Daniel Brennare - vocals, lead guitar
- Mikael Larsson - bass
- Johan Oudhuis - drums

=== Additional personnel ===
- Tomas Skogsberg - production, mixing, keyboards, guitar solo on "Greater Art"
- Mathias Lodmalm - production, mixing, guitar solo on "Greater Art"
- Börje Forsberg - executive production
- Kristian Wåhlin - cover art
