= Headstones (album) =

Studio album by Lake of Tears
- Released: October 17, 1995
- Recorded: March–April 1995
- Studio: Wavestation
- Genre: Gothic metal, doom metal, acoustic rock
- Length: 48:23
- Label: Black Mark
- Producer: Ulf Petterson

Lake of Tears chronology
Greater Art (1994)	Headstones (1995)	A Crimson Cosmos (1997)

Headstones is the second studio album by the gothic metal band Lake of Tears. Released in 1995, the album showed the band abandoning the death/doom of the previous work in favor of "a mixture of Gothic, Doom, Acoustic and Melancholy."

== Track listing ==
No.	Title	Length
1.	"A Foreign Road"	4:07
2.	"Raven Land"	5:42
3.	"Dreamdemons"	5:14
4.	"Sweetwater"	4:33
5.	"Life's But a Dream"	1:25
6.	"Headstones"	5:16
7.	"Twilight"	4:58
8.	"Burn Fire Burn"	3:39
9.	"The Path of the Gods (Upon the Highest Mountain, Part 2)"	13:29
Total length:		48:23

Professional ratings
Review scores
Source	Rating
Allmusic	3/5 stars
Chronicles of Chaos	7/10
Metal Storm	10/10

== Personnel ==
- Johan Oudhuis - drums
- Mikael Larsson - bass
- Jonas Eriksson - guitars
- Daniel Brennare - vocals, guitars

== Additional personnel ==
- Annica Karlsson - female vocals
- Mikael Hult - acoustic guitar on "Headstones"
- Ulf Petterson - keyboards, producer, recording, mixing
- Kristian Wåhlin - cover art
- Anton Hedberg - photography
- Börje Forsberg - producer
