= Devil's Force =

Studio album by Nifelheim
- Released: June 1998
- Recorded: 1997
- Genre: Black metal, speed metal
- Label: Necropolis
- Producer: Nifelheim & Isak Edh

Nifelheim chronology
Nifelheim (1994)	Devil's Force (1998)	Servants of Darkness (2000)

Professional ratings
Review scores
Source	Rating
Allmusic	3.5/5.0 stars

Devil's Force is the second album of Swedish black metal band Nifelheim. It was released in 1998 on CD and LP. The final track "Hellish Blasphemy" was featured on the Gummo soundtrack.

== Track listing ==
1. "Deathstrike from Hell" – 3:48
2. "The Final Slaughter" – 4:45
3. "Desecration of the Dead" – 4:48
4. "Demonic Evil" – 3:16
5. "Satanic Mass" – 4:49
6. "Soldier of Satan" – 3:54
7. "Devil's Force" – 3:43
8. "Hellish Blasphemy" – 3:02

== Personnel ==
- Hellbutcher (Per Gustavsson) – vocals
- Tyrant (Erik Gustavsson) – bass, guitar
- John Zwetsloot – guitar
- Jon Nödtveidt – guitar
- Demon (??) – drums
