= Lake of Tears =

Swedish band

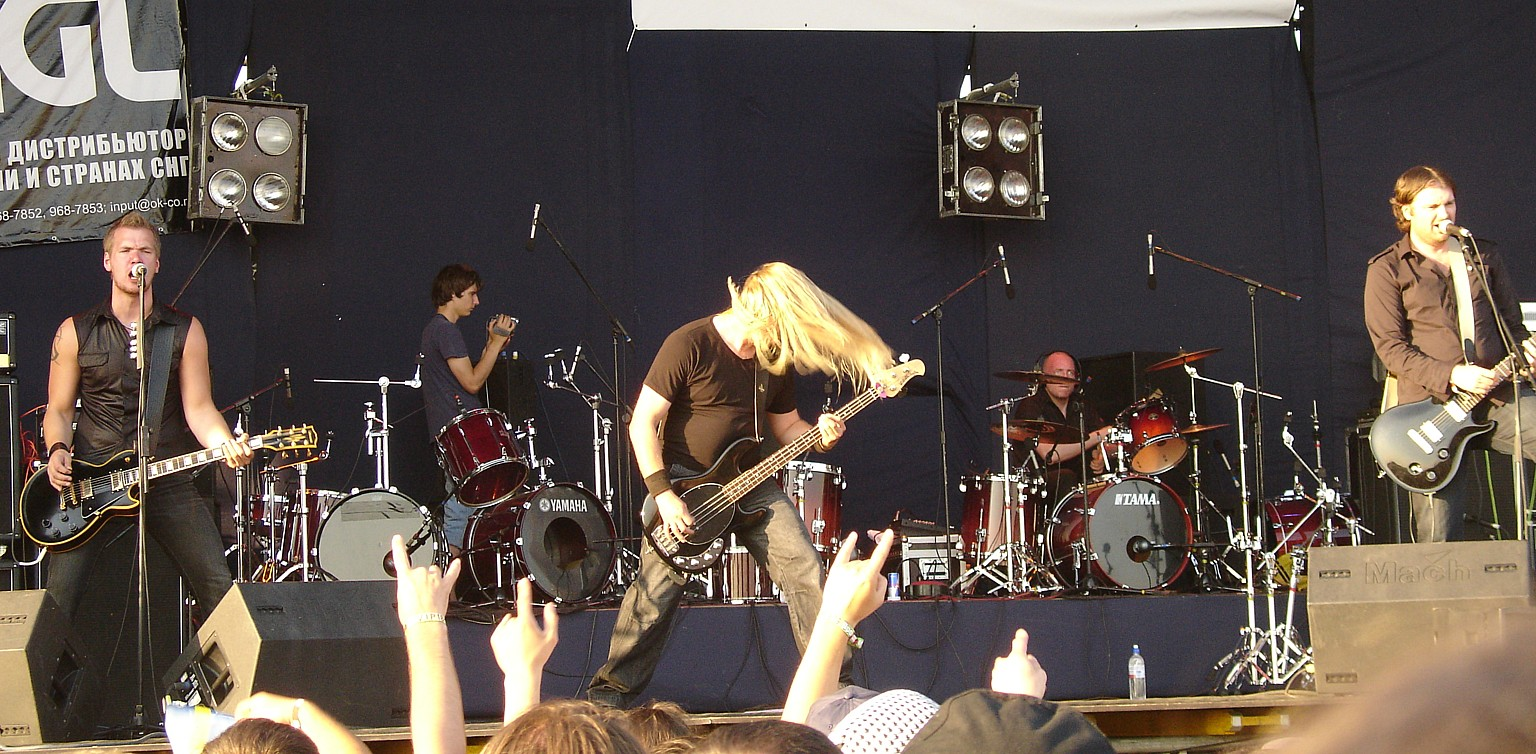
- Lake of Tears at ProRock 2009 in Ukraine. From left to right: Fredrik Jordanius, Mikael Larsson, Johan Oudhuis and Daniel Brennare.

Background information
- Origin: Borås, Sweden
- Genres: Gothic metal; doom metal; progressive metal; gothic rock; death-doom (early)
- Years active: 1994–2000, 2003–present
- Labels: AFM; Beverina; Black Mark; Casus Belli; Century Media; Circle of the 111 Vinyl Saviours; Dockyard1; East Rock; Icarus; Irond; Locomotive; Moon; Morbid Noizz; Night of the Vinyl Dead; Noise; Sanctuary; Scarecrow; Seoul; Soyuz; Sweetwater; The Circle; Victor
- Members: Daniel Brennare; Mikael Larsson; Johan Oudhuis; Fredrik Jordanius
- Past members: Jonas Eriksson; Christian Saarinen; Ulrik Lindblom; Magnus Sahlgren
- Website: lakeoftears.net

Lake of Tears is a Swedish heavy metal band formed in 1994, generally considered to play gothic metal/gothic rock and doom metal. However, their sound has expanded to include psychedelic rock and progressive rock elements. The band broke up in 2000 amid creative differences, but reunited in late 2003, releasing the acclaimed album Black Brick Road. They released their eighth studio album, Illwill, in April 2011. In 2014 they released their first live album, By the Black Sea. The band's newest album, titled Ominous, was released on 18 February 2021.

== History ==
=== Early years ===
Lake of Tears was founded in the early 1990s by Daniel Brennare, Jonas Eriksson, Mikael Larsson and Johan Oudhuis. Their first album, entitled Greater Art, was released through the record label Black Mark Production in 1994. The album is doom metal featuring coarse, ragged vocals and crushing guitars. The band would subsequently steer away from such a directly categorized style, only revisiting it on their 2011 release Illwill.

Lake of Tears wowed critics and fans alike with their second recording, Headstones, released in 1995. The music underwent important changes, expanding on the riff-base of doom metal to achieve a more melodic and melancholic sound. The lyrics also explored new territory, intensely mournful and psychedelic fantasy imagery enhancing the album's heavy, autumnal soundscapes.

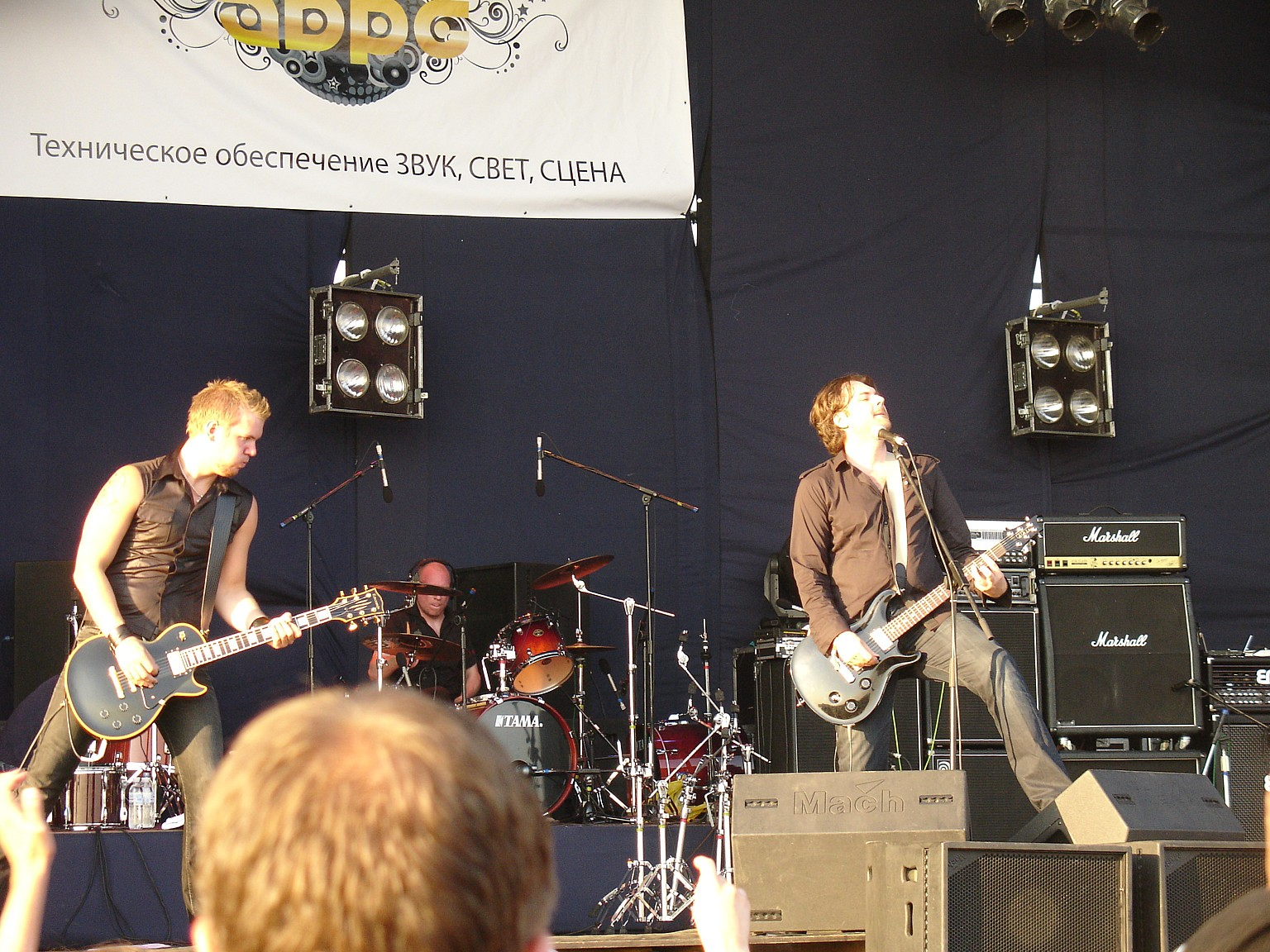
Lake of Tears during ProRock-2009 festival LTR: Fredrik Jordanius, Johan Oudhuis, Daniel Brennare

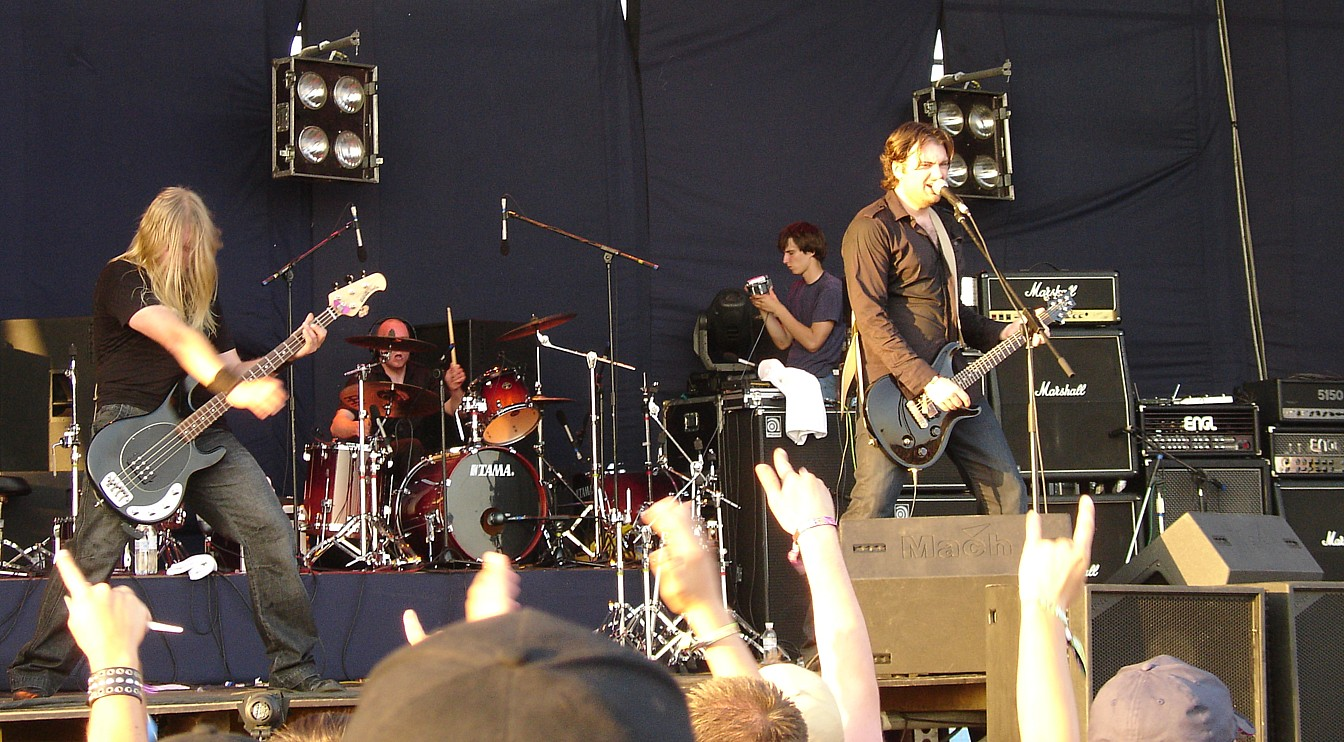
Lake of Tears during ProRock-2009 festival LTR: Mikael Larsson, Johan Oudhuis, Daniel Brennare

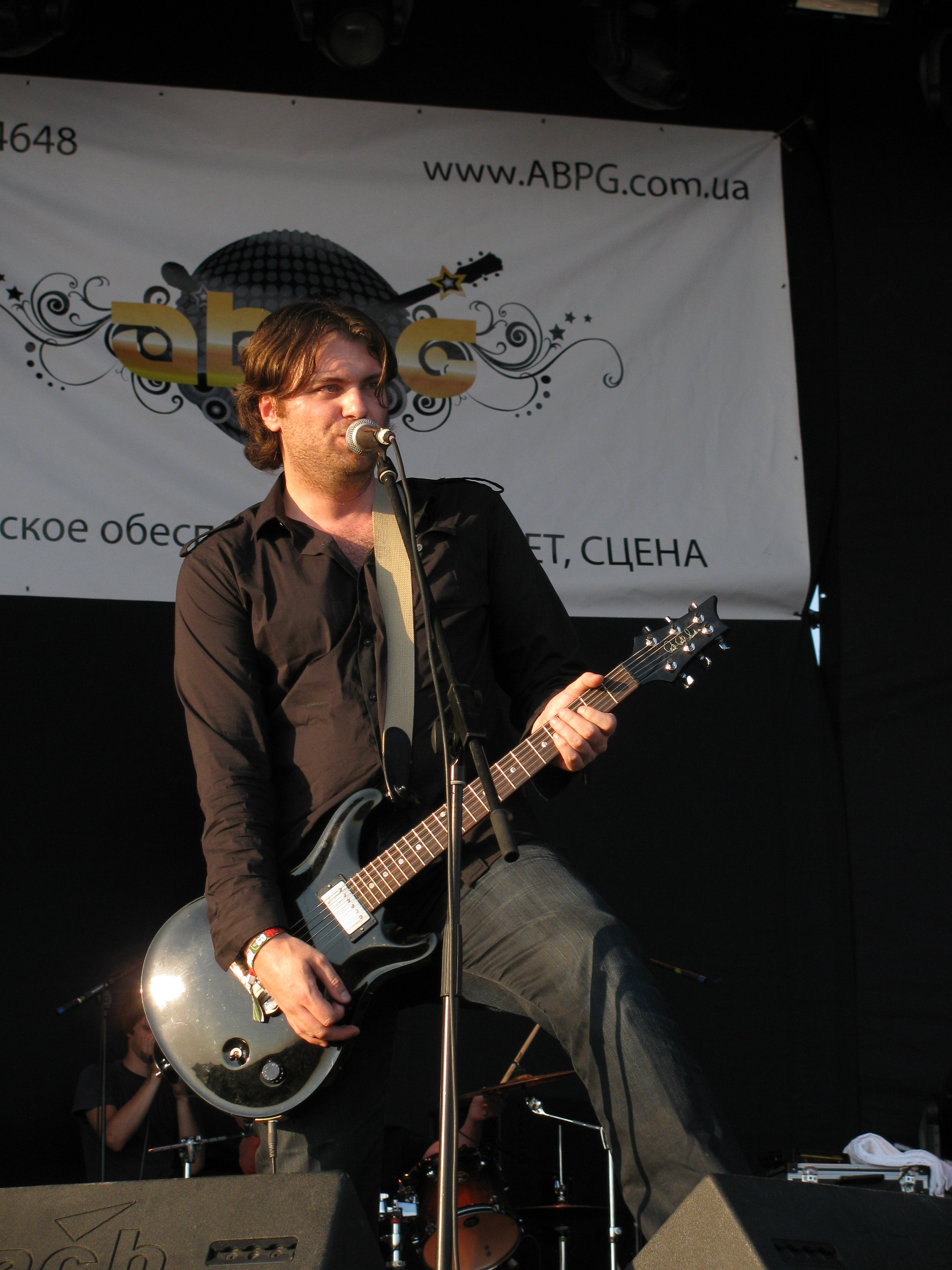
Daniel Brennare at ProRock 2009 festival

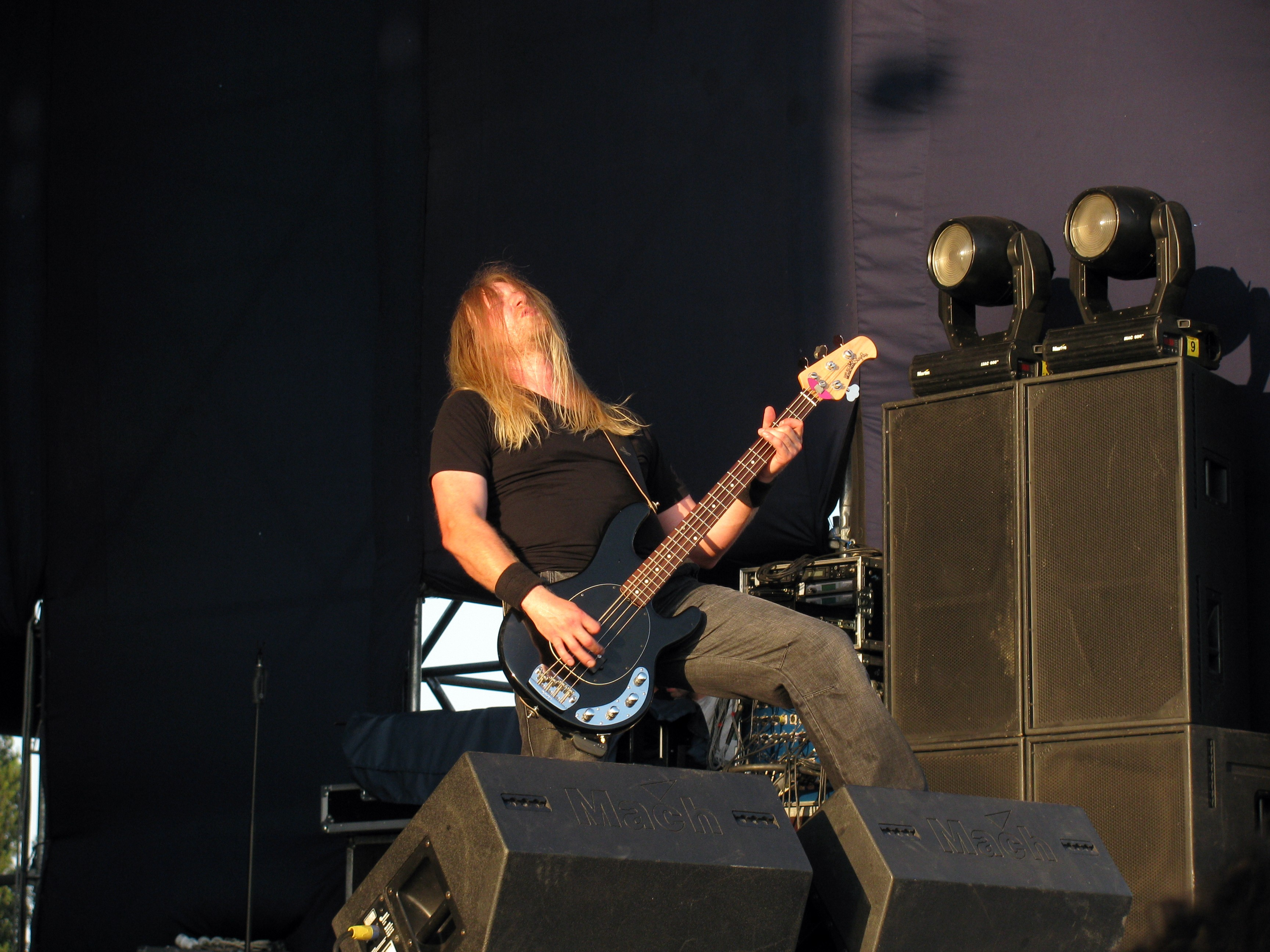
Mikael Larsson at ProRock 2009 festival

=== Mid-career success: A Crimson Cosmos ===
1997 brought the release of the band's most popular studio effort until then, A Crimson Cosmos. If Headstones had been a revision of their earlier sound, A Crimson Cosmos was a complete rebirth, being a hypnotically melodic album. The release's closing track, "A Crimson Cosmos", reflected a marked influence by progressive/psychedelic luminaries Pink Floyd, while other tracks, such as Lady Rosenred and Raistlin and the Rose reflected popular fantasy themes. Rhythm guitarist Jonas Eriksson had left the band before the release, being replaced by guitarist Ulrik Lindblom. After recording A Crimson Cosmos and touring with Lake of Tears until 1999, he also left the band and had to be substituted by Magnus Sahlgren, who played as lead guitarist, but only as a guest artist. Although he played on Forever Autumn and every subsequent Lake of Tears album, often composing the majority of lead guitar riffs, Sahlgren was only formally accepted as a band member following the release of 2004's Black Brick Road.

Lake of Tears' 1999 album, Forever Autumn, did not follow the trend settled by Headstones and A Crimson Cosmos, resulting an intensely quiet and introspective album. Keyboardist Christian Saarinen was briefly included as an official band member, adding an extra layer to the band's sound. Fantasy imagery was rife and the album's overall effect was sedate and sorrowful.

=== The breakup ===
Because of personal and creative differences, but also (and perhaps more-so) because of the lack of attention the band received from their label, the band went their separate ways shortly after the release of Forever Autumn, though they were still contractually bound to deliver one more album for Black Mark Production. This being the case, Brennare and Sahlgren retreated to the studio to record The Neonai, an electronica-influenced album relying on drum machines and uncharacteristically slick production values. The resulting album was released in 2002, and featured some of the band's most inspired songwriting and memorable melodies, regardless of the hasty manner in which it was composed and recorded.

=== The reunion and recent activity ===
In 2003, following a period of inactivity after the release of The Neonai (2002), Lake of Tears reunited and began rehearsing and jamming together again. Interviews with band members describe the reunion as informal at first, with the group gradually resuming collaboration and beginning to develop new material.

The material developed during this period eventually formed the basis of their 2004 album Black Brick Road. The band later stated that the reunion marked a renewed creative phase after the break, leading to new songwriting sessions and studio preparation.

Following the end of their contract with Black Mark Production, the band expressed dissatisfaction with the label’s handling of their previous releases and began seeking a new record deal. They subsequently signed with Noise Records prior to the release of Black Brick Road.

Moons and Mushrooms was released on 26 April 2007 as the band’s seventh studio album. Reviews described it as a stylistic shift toward a more guitar-driven and hard rock-oriented sound compared to its predecessor Black Brick Road, with reduced emphasis on electronic and keyboard-based arrangements.

The album was also noted for having been developed in a more collaborative and performance-oriented writing process, with songs shaped directly through band rehearsal and jamming rather than relying heavily on pre-programmed or studio-based composition methods.

Despite the shift in instrumentation, reviewers observed that the album retained the band’s characteristic melancholic atmosphere, particularly in its vocal delivery and lyrical tone.

Illwill was released on 29 April 2011 as the band's eighth studio album. Reviews described the album as a stylistic shift toward a heavier and more guitar-driven sound compared to previous releases, with stronger influences from hard rock and heavy metal and reduced emphasis on the band's earlier atmospheric and gothic doom elements.

Contemporary reviews further noted a darker and more aggressive tone in both instrumentation and vocal delivery, with several critics highlighting a shift toward more forceful, riff-driven compositions and a less melancholic atmosphere than the band's earlier work.

Lake of Tears released their first-ever live album on 31 January 2014. The album is titled By the Black Sea, and includes a full concert with 16 songs recorded earlier this year in Bucharest, Romania. It is also available as DVD/CD set.

On 13 July 2020, Daniel Brennare publicly disclosed that he had been diagnosed with chronic leukemia, and that Illwill was "maybe a more obscure way" of dealing with it The same post suggests the name of the next album is "Ominous".

== Current line-up ==
- Daniel Brennare — guitars, vocals, additional keyboards (1994—present)

=== Former members ===
- Jonas Eriksson — rhythm guitar (1994–1997)
- Christian Saarinen — keyboards (1999–2000)
- Ulrik Lindblom — guitar (1997–1999)
- Magnus Sahlgren — lead guitar (as a guest artist: 1999 / officially: 2004–2009)
- Mikael Larsson — bass (1994–2015)
- Johan Oudhuis — drums (1994–2017)
- Fredrik Jordanius — lead guitar (2009–2015)

== Discography ==
=== Full length ===
- Greater Art (1994)
- Headstones (1995)
- A Crimson Cosmos (1997)
- Forever Autumn (1999)
- The Neonai (2002)
- Black Brick Road (2004)
- Moons and Mushrooms (2007)
- Illwill (2011)
- Ominous (2021)

=== EPs and singles ===
- Demo 1 (1993)
- Lady Rosenred (1997)
- Sorcerers / Nathalie and the Fireflies (2002)
- Wyverns (2014)

=== Compilation albums ===
- Greatest Tears Vol. I (2004)
- Greatest Tears Vol. II (2004)

=== Live albums ===
- By the Black Sea (2014)
