= Morbid (band) =

Swedish extreme metal band

- Origin: Stockholm, Sweden
- Genres: Death metal; thrash metal; black metal
- Years active: 1986–1988; 2022–present
- Past members: Pelle Ohlin; John Hagström; TG; Jens Näsström; Lars-Göran Petrov; Ulf Cederlund; John Scarisbrick

Morbid is a Swedish extreme metal band from Stockholm that formed in 1986.

== History ==
Morbid was formed in Stockholm at the end of 1986. With Per "Dead" Ohlin as the group's founder and leader, there were a number of members before the band settled on the line-up of John "John Lennart" Hagström, "TG" on guitars, Jens Näsström on bass and Lars-Göran Petrov on drums. When "TG" left the band, Ulf Cederlund replaced him. The band recorded their debut demo, December Moon, at Thunderload Studios in Stockholm on 5 and 6 December 1987. This was the only recording with this line-up, as Hagström quit and Ohlin left for Norway to join black metal band Mayhem. The remains of the band brought in photographer John Scarisbrick as a new vocalist. Scarisbrick lived near a recording studio named Sunlight, which would gain notoriety in death metal circles, recording bands like Entombed and Dismember. There, the band recorded their last release, a demo titled The Last Supper, in September 1988. The band faded as Petrov and Cederlund started Nihilist, which turned into Entombed. Näsström continued in the bands Contras and Skull.

== Legacy ==
Although Morbid only officially released two demos, they gained a certain cult status after their break-up, in part likely to Ohlin's efforts with Mayhem. The demo recordings and various live and rehearsal tracks were later published on vinyl and CD, on official and bootleg releases. After Ohlin left the band to move to Kråkstad, he was replaced by the former singer, John Scarisbrick.

== Members ==
=== Current members ===
- John Hagström (as Gehenna) – guitars (1986–1988, 2022–present)
- Jens Näsström (as Dr. Schitz) – bass (1986–1988, 2022–present)
- Torbjörn Gräslund (as TG) – guitars (1987, 2022–present)
- Ulf "Uffe" Cederlund (as Napoleon Pukes) – guitars (1987–1988, 2022–present)
- Daniel Ohlin (as Necrobird) – vocals (2022–present)
- Erik Danielsson (as Rötan) – drums (2022–present)

=== Former members ===
- Per "Dead" Ohlin – vocals (1986–1988; died 1991)
- Slator – bass (1986)
- Francesco Sandro Lauri Cajander – drums (1986)
- Marcus Klack (as Klacke) – guitars (1986–1987)
- Lars-Göran Petrov (as Drutten) – drums (1987–1988; died 2021)
- Johan Scarisbrick – vocals (1988)
- Zoran Jovanovic – guitars (1988)

== Discography ==
- Rehearsal 07/08/1987 (demo, 1987)
- December Moon (demo, 1987)
- Last Supper... (demo, 1988)
- Death Execution (compilation, 1995, bootleg)
- Live in Stockholm (LP, Reaper, 2000, bootleg)
- Death Execution II (7", Reaper, 2001, bootleg)
- Year of the Goat (live-compilation, Century Media, 2011)

== Works cited ==
- Ekeroth, Daniel (2007). Swedish Death Metal. Tamara Press. ISBN 978-91-974334-2-6.
