= Nifelheim (album) =

Studio album by Nifelheim
- Released: 1995
- Recorded: 8–14 December 1994 at Studio Fredman
- Genre: Black metal
- Label: Necropolis
- Producers: Nifelheim & Fredrik Nordström

Nifelheim chronology
| Nifelheim (1995) | Devil's Force (1997) |

Nifelheim is the self-titled debut album by Swedish black metal band Nifelheim. In 2013, Decibel ranked it at number 53 on its list of the Top 100 Black Metal Albums of All Time.

== Track listing ==
1. "The Devastation" - 3:00
2. "Black Curse" - 4:56
3. "Unholy Death" - 2:02
4. "Possessed by Evil" - 3:53
5. "Sodomizer" - 5:07
6. "Satanic Sacrifice" - 3:14
7. "Storm of Satan's Fire" - 4:33
8. "Witchfuck" - 3:03
