= Illusions of Grandeur =

Studio album by Evocation
- Released: September 24, 2012 (Europe); November 13, 2012 (North America)
- Recorded: Recorded at Evocation Studios & recorded and mixed at IF Studios. Mastered at Bohus Sound Studios.
- Genre: Melodic Death Metal
- Label: Century Media
- Producer: Roberto Laghi

Evocation chronology
Apocalyptic (2010)	Illusions of Grandeur (2012)	The Shadow Archetype (2017)

Professional ratings
Review scores
Source	Rating
About.com	3/5 stars
Blistering	8/10 stars
Metal Temple	7/10 stars

Illusions of Grandeur is the fourth studio album by Swedish death metal band Evocation. It was released on 24 September 2012 through Century Media Records. It was released on CD and vinyl.

== Track listing ==
No.	Title	Length
1.	"Illusions of Grandeur"	04:08
2.	"Well of Despair"	04:26
3.	"Divide and Conquer"	05:20
4.	"Perception of Reality"	04:26
5.	"Metus Odium"	04:24
6.	"I'll Be Your Suicide"	02:57
7.	"Crimson Skies"	04:07
8.	"Into Submission"	03:35
9.	"The Seven Faces of God"	04:53
10.	"Final Disclosure"	03:52
Total length:		42:08

Limited Edition Bonus Tracks
No.	Title	Length
11.	"Shades of Shame"	03:57
12.	"Dark Day Dawn"	02:48
13.	"Dead Without a Trace"	04:28
Total length:		53:21

== Personnel ==
Evocation

- Janne Kenttäkumpu Bodén - drums, backing vocals
- Vesa Kenttäkumpu - guitars
- Marko Palmén - guitars
- Thomas Josefsson - vocals
- Gustaf Jorde - bass

Guest musicians

- Johan Hegg - additional vocals on "Into Submission"

Miscellaneous staff

- Michał "Xaay" Loranc - artwork, cover art
- Roberto Laghi - production, mixing
- Dragan Tanasković - mastering
