= December Moon =

Demo album by Morbid
- Released: December 1987; Reissued in 1994 and 2000
- Recorded: 5–6 December 1987
- Genre: Death metal, black metal, thrash metal
- Length: 17:45
- Label: Reaper

Morbid chronology
Rehearsal 07/08/1987 (1987)	December Moon (1987)	Last Supper (1988)

December Moon is the debut demo tape by Swedish metal band Morbid. The album was recorded at Thunderload Studios in Stockholm on 5 and 6 December 1987. With this demo, Morbid became notorious and had a great impact upon the Swedish death metal scene. December Moon was reissued in 1994 and 2000.

== Track listing ==
1. "My Dark Subconscious" – 4:41
2. "Wings of Funeral" – 3:47
3. "From the Dark" – 6:00
4. "Disgusting Semla" – 3:17

2000 reissue

5. "My Dark Subconscious"
6. "Wings of Funeral" (rehearsal)
7. "Tragic Dream / From the Dark" (rehearsal)
8. "Citythrasher" (rehearsal)
9. "Deathexecution" (rehearsal)
10. "Disgusting Semla" (rehearsal)

== Credits ==
- Dead – vocals
- Napolean Pukes – guitar, backing vocals
- John Lennart – guitar, backing vocals
- Dr. Schitz – bass
- Drutten – drums, additional vocals
