= Vengeance Descending (Crystal Eyes album) =

Studio album by Crystal Eyes
- Released: 2003
- Genre: Power metal
- Label: Heavy Fidelity

Crystal Eyes chronology
In Silence They March (2000)	Vengeance Descending (2003)	Confessions of the Maker (2005)

Vengeance Descending is Crystal Eyes' third album released in 2003 by Heavy Fidelity.

The album was rated a 4 out of 5 by The Metal Crypt.

== Track listing ==
1. "Vengeance Descending" - 5:52
2. "Highland Revenge" - 5:02
3. "Child of Rock" - 6:17
4. "Mr. Failure" - 5:32
5. "Dream Chaser" - 6:43
6. "The Wizard's Apprentice" - 7:11
7. "Metal Crusade" - 5:12
8. "The Beast in Velvet" - 5:29
9. "Heart of the Mountain" - 5:43
10. "Oblivion in the Visionary World" - 5:54

== Credits ==
Mikael Dahl - Vocals and Guitar
Jonathan Nyberg - Guitar
Claes Wikander - Bass Guitar
Stefan Svantesson - Drums
Daniel Heiman - Vocals on "The Wizard's Apprentice"

Production and mixing by Mikael Dahl and Claes Wikander at Crystal Sounds
Mastering by Tobias Lindell
Cover artwork by Kristian Wåhlin
