= Crystal Eyes =

Swedish band

- Origin: Borås, Sweden
- Genres: Power metal Heavy Metal
- Years active: 1992–present
- Label: Metal Heaven
- Members: Mikael Dahl; Niclas Karlsson; Claes Wikander; Stefan Svantesson
- Website: crystaleyes.net

Crystal Eyes is a Swedish power metal band formed in 1992. Singer, guitarist and songwriter Mikael Dahl is the only constant member in their line-up. It was announced in 2009 that vocalist Søren Nico Adamsen would be leaving the band and that Mikael Dahl would be resuming vocal duties. In 2012, guitarist Paul Petterson left the band and was replaced by former guitarist Nicolas Karlsson. On 11 May 2012 the band celebrated its 20th anniversary with a special concert featuring songs from all of their albums.

== Discography ==
- World of Black and Silver (1999)
- In Silence They March (2000)
- Vengeance Descending (2003)
- Confessions of the Maker (2005)
- Dead City Dreaming (2006)
- Chained (2008)
- Killer (2014)
- Starbourne Traveler (2019)

== Line-up ==
- Mikael Dahl – Vocals, Guitar
- Niclas Karlsson – Guitar
- Claes Wikander – Bass
- Stefan Svantesson – Drums

== Former members ==
=== Vocals ===
- Søren Nico Adamsen (2006–2009)

=== Guitar ===
- Paul Petterson (2006–2012)
- Jukka Kaupaamaa (1995–1997)
- Jonathan Nyberg (1997–2006)

=== Bass ===
- Christian Gunnarsson (1992–1993)
- Mikael Blohm (1993–1995)
- Kim Koivo (1995–1996)
- Marko Nicolaidis (1996–1997)

=== Drums ===
- Fredrik Gröndahl (1993–1994)
- Martin Tilander (1994–1995)
- Kujtim Gashi (1995–2001)

=== Session vocals ===
- Daniel Heiman (2005)
