= Sacramentum (band) =

Swedish melodic black metal band

- Sacramentum in 2023, Athens, Greece

Background information
- Also known as: Tumulus (1990–1992)
- Origin: Falköping, Sweden
- Genres: Melodic black metal; melodic black/death
- Years active: 1992–2001, 2019–present
- Labels: Century Media, Adipocere
- Members: Anders Brolycke; Calle Anderson; Patrick Dagland
- Past members: Nisse Karlén; Niklas Andersson; Pär Åhag; Freddy Andersson; Mikael Rydén; Nicklas Rudolfsson
- Website: sacramentum.se

Sacramentum is a melodic black metal band from Falköping, Sweden, formed by Nisse Karlén (vocals/guitar) in the summer of 1990 as Tumulus. The band released three full-length studio albums and two demos.

== History ==
Shortly thereafter, Anders Brolycke joined as a second guitarist. The group's first official recordings were made in the end of 1992. Before the release of the demo tape Sedes Impiorum, the band changed name to Sacramentum. In February 1994, Sacramentum recorded the self-financed, five-track EP Finis Malorumwent at Unisound Studio. Adipocere Records released it a year later. Following the EP, Nicklas Rudolfsson joined in on drums, and Karlén shifted to bass. According to Karlén,

When we started it was just because we wanted to make extreme music, violent music. We had no ambitions whatsoever. Then thing started to happen. A lot of people liked the stuff we made. So we became more serious and after we had recorded the MCD “Finis Malorum” we realized that we could really achieve something. So we kicked out the unserious members and started rehearse more often and that’s the way it is. I think that everything we could dream about then has been fulfilled but we will carry on for many years to spread our message of hatred.

—

This three-piece line-up returned to Unisound Studio in June 1995 to record their full-length debut, Far Away from the Sun. Released in June 1996, some circles praised the album. The band toured Europe with Ancient Rites, Bewitched and Enthroned.

In the spring 1997, Sacramentum signed with Century Media. They recorded the second full-length album, The Coming of Chaos, in June 1997 in King Diamond guitarist Andy LaRocque's studio, Los Angered Recordings in Gothenburg, Sweden, and released it in September 1997 on Century Media Records. It showcased a blackened death metal direction. AllMusic's Steve Huey wrote, "Thanks to improved production, as well as the band's musical development, The Coming of Chaos is the best Sacramentum release available, not to mention their first domestic album." The band toured Europe with Old Man's Child and Rotting Christ.

Sacramentum recorded their final album, Thy Black Destiny, in September 1998 at Los Angered Recordings, and released it on 13 April 1999. Nicklas Andersson of Lord Belial joined the group as a permanent guitarist. The band apparently split up sometime later. "Employing classic death metal sounds, Sacramentum strip their sound down to the basics on Thy Black Destiny, recalling old-school thrash yet still mixing it up with enough modern black metal to stay contemporary."

In 2008, Century Media reissued their last two albums, The Coming of Chaos and Thy Black Destiny, in the compilation Abyss of Time.

As of 2012, Anders Brolycke played guitar with Swedish black metal band Likblek, who released their self-titled debut full-length album in 2010.

In 2013, Century Media reissued the band's debut album, Far Away from the Sun, in CD, vinyl, and picture disc. Necrolord rescanned the album art. Dan Swanö remastered the music. Nora Dirkling provided a new layout.

Nisse, Anders and Nicklas reformed the band reunited in 2019. Sacramentum played their first live performance shortly before the COVID-19 pandemic. They resumed live activities in 2022 with a new line-up.

On 25 August 2025, it was announced that lead vocalist Nisse Karlén had died by suicide. He was 50.

== Musical style and influences ==
On the band's first album they performed a style of melodic black metal that has been compared to bands such as Dissection and Unanimated, which involved "a mixture of Black Metal's atmosphere and speed with the technicality and arrangement normally found in Death Metal". Over time the band began to move towards the kind of melodic death metal sound many of their contemporaries in Gothenburg were pioneering. Nisse Karlén has said that "Our influences comes mostly from old heavy Metal bands and a lot of speed and thrash bands where we have our roots. A lot also comes from within ourselves, moods and so on." Anders Brolycke has cited Bathory, Destruction, Coroner, Slayer, Autopsy, Death, and Metallica as influences. He also said that "The lyrics are held on a personal level and deal with thoughts and reflections about life and death. They are often about a longing away from this earthly prison."

== Band members ==
=== Current ===
- Anders Brolycke – guitars (1990-2001, 2019-present)
- Calle Andersson - guitars (2021-present)
- Patrick Dagland – drums (2022-present)

=== Former ===
- Nisse Karlén – lead vocals (1990-2001, 2019-2025; his death), guitar (1990-1994), bass (1994-2001)
- Nicklas Rudolfsson - drums (1994-2001, 2019-2021)
- Johan Norman - guitar (1994-1995)
- Niclas Andersson – guitars (1998-2001)
- Freddy Andersson – bass guitar (1990-1994)
- Mikael Rydén – drums (1990-1994)

=== Live/session ===
- Thomas Backelin - guitar (2000)
- Tobias Kellgren – drums (2000-2001, 2021-2022)
- Jonas Blom - guitar (2019-2021)
- Robert Axelsson - bass (2019-2024)
- Julia von Krusenstjerna - bass (2023-2024)
- Andreas "Heljarmadr" Vingbäck - vocals (2025-present)

== Discography ==
- 1993: Sedes Impiorum (demo)
- 1994: Finis Malorum (EP)
- 1996: Far Away from the Sun (album)
- 1997: The Coming of Chaos (album)
- 1998: "13 Candles" on In Conspiracy with Satan – A Tribute to Bathory
- 1998: "The Curse/Antichrist" on A Tribute to Sepultura
- 1998: "Black Masses" on Tribute to Mercyful Fate
- 1999: Thy Black Destiny (album)
- 2008: Abyss of Time (compilation consisting of The Coming of Chaos and Thy Black Destiny)
- TBA: Shadow of Oblivion (album)
