= Magnus Sahlgren =

Swedish musician and computational linguist

Magnus Sahlgren (born 1 January 1973) is a Swedish computational linguist and guitarist.

== Academic career ==
Magnus Sahlgren is known for his work on Random indexing applied to distributional semantics published through research projects at the Swedish Institute of Computer Science and later at Gavagai AB, the research company he co-founded in 2008. Sahlgren's dissertation The Word-Space Model was awarded the prize for the most prominent scholarly achievement of 2006 at the Stockholm University Faculty of Humanities.

== Musical career ==
Sahlgren was the lead guitarist of the metal band Lake of Tears, whom his name is most associated with, until 2009. He also played with Dismember from 1998 to 2003 and with Tiamat during the recording of the acclaimed Wildhoney album in 1994. He helped the band achieve technical proficiency by helping with the songwriting and solos when he was a session artist. In 2004, he was accepted as a full-time member of Lake of Tears and since then his influences have been even more visible, notably on the album Moons and Mushrooms, on which he performs solos on every track.
