= Destroyer of Worlds (album) =

Studio album by Bathory
- Released: 9 October 2001
- Recorded: June 2001
- Genres: Viking metal; thrash metal
- Length: 65:57
- Label: Black Mark
- Producers: Borje Forsberg, Quorthon

Bathory chronology
Blood on Ice (1996)	Destroyer of Worlds (2001)	Nordland I (2002)

Destroyer of Worlds is the tenth studio album by Swedish extreme metal band Bathory. It was released on 9 October 2001 through Black Mark Production, over five years after the previous album Blood on Ice (1996), marking the longest period between studio albums by Bathory. Quorthon performs all instruments on this album, similarly to how he did on Twilight of the Gods and all albums after Destroyer of Worlds.

== Background ==
Quorthon was working on another Bathory album, which had a "rather progressive" sound to it; fans were sending in mail from 1999 until 2000 talking about how they wanted the new album to sound like older Bathory material. 25 songs were scrapped as a result.

The title of the album was originally Nemesis, but it was renamed after the band Grip Inc. released an album of the same name. The album's title is taken from a famous quote by J. Robert Oppenheimer about the atomic bomb: "I am become death, destroyer of worlds".

Stylistically, Destroyer of Worlds is a cross between the Viking metal of Bathory's 1988–1991 period and the thrash metal style of Requiem and Octagon. It is Bathory's longest studio album.

== Reception ==
Professional ratings
Review scores
Source	Rating
Chronicles of Chaos	7.5/10

Quorthon noted in a 2003 interview that the new direction of the album was "a mistake."

== Track listing ==
All tracks are written by Quorthon.

No.	Title	Length
1.	"Lake of Fire"	5:43
2.	"Destroyer of Worlds"	4:51
3.	"Ode"	6:27
4.	"Bleeding"	3:55
5.	"Pestilence"	6:50
6.	"109"	3:36
7.	"Death from Above"	4:35
8.	"Krom"	2:50
9.	"Liberty & Justice"	3:52
10.	"Kill Kill Kill"	3:09
11.	"Sudden Death"	3:19
12.	"White Bones"	8:35
13.	"Day of Wrath"	8:15
Total length:		65:57

== Personnel ==
- Quorthon – All instruments
