= Ibanez Destroyer =

Model of electric guitar

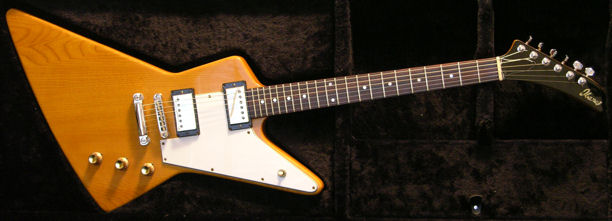
1975 pre-serial number Model 2459 (Korina Destroyer)

The Destroyer is an Ibanez brand electric guitar model (originally) manufactured at the FujiGen musical instrument factory for the Hoshino Gakki Company. The Destroyer model was first introduced by Hoshino Gakki in 1975 and was based on the Gibson Explorer design. The Destroyer has since undergone several design and line changes and has been available in both 6-string and bass versions.

The star-shape variant was one of the first eccentrically-shaped guitars at the time with a floating tremolo system, making it a popular choice for the heavy metal and shred musicians of the 1980s.

== Notable Ibanez Destroyer players ==
- Eddie Van Halen (1955–2020) guitarist and founder of the American hard rock band Van Halen, used a Model 2459 Korina Destroyer for the recording of its first album Van Halen, which is also featured (in heavily modified "Shark guitar" form) on the cover of their third album, Women and Children First.
- Adrian Smith (born 1957) guitarist of Iron Maiden played a Japanese version of the DT300 during The Number of the Beast tour in the early '80s and still owns it.
- Paul Stanley played a black DT300 and used it as his primary guitar during the Unmasked Tour in 1980. Before that Ace Frehley played a tan model whilst making the Destroyer album (of no connection in title) in 1976.
- Phil Collen (born 1957) lead guitarist of Def Leppard played a DT555 as his main guitar from 1981 until the end of the Pyromania World Tour in 1984. He still has three more copies of this guitar.
- Dave Mustaine (born 1961) (Megadeth) played a Destroyer in his Metallica years (1981–1983)
- Jay Jay French (born 1952) and Eddie "Fingers" Ojeda of the American heavy metal band Twisted Sister both played modified mid-70's Korina Destroyers.
- Conrad Lant (born 1963) also known by the stage name of Cronos, bass player of Venom played a Destroyer bass guitar.
- Tom Angelripper (born 1963) bassist for Sodom used an Ibanez Destroyer Bass
- Quorthon (1966–2004) Swedish metal musician and founder of black/viking metal band Bathory. He used Destroyer model D-10 guitars on every Bathory album until 1995's album Octagon.
- Kid Congo Powers (born 1961) used a Destroyer in his tenure with The Cramps (1980–1983)
- Dave Keuning (born 1975) primarily used a Destroyer on stage and recordings with The Killers
- Nick Hipa (born 1982) as seen in As I Lay Dying music video's "Parallels" and various tour.
