= The Secret Doctrine (album) =

Studio album by Morgana Lefay
- Released: 1993
- Recorded: Wavestation L.A., Sweden
- Genre: Heavy metal, power metal, thrash metal
- Label: Black Mark Records
- Producer: Morgana Lefay & Ulf Peterson

Morgana Lefay chronology
Knowing Just as I (1993)	The Secret Doctrine (1993)	Sanctified (1995)

The Secret Doctrine is the third album for Swedish heavy metal band Morgana Lefay.

After the band released Knowing Just as I in 1993 and toured for three weeks on the basis of that album, the band managed to return to the studio where The Secret Doctrine was laid down in 28 days. Thus, they managed to release The Secret Doctrine only 9 months after the previous record came out.

== Reception ==
In Rock Hard Magazine, the reviewer stated that Morgana Lefay played in a traditional, but not old-fashioned, metal style. Morgana Lefay gave "the Clawfingers and other trend-setters of this world the middle finger" and "definitely [did] NOT contain any alternative/grunge sequences". While Morgana Lefay built upon the work of outfits such as Iced Earth and Metal Church, the reviewer praised the stylistic variation on the album, from power ballads via mid-tempo to high-tempo songs. Whereas the guitarists were "outstanding", the vocalist had improved the most since Knowing Just as I. With a clear and powerful sound and "beautiful cover artwork" too, the reviewer landed on a 9 out of 10 score. Norway's Scream gave 5 out of 6, stating that The Secret Doctrine was more consistent than the previous one, but "I miss a few of the 'killer songs' we found on the first one". The album was also reviewed by Metal Hammer Germany.

== Track listing ==
All music & lyrics written by: Morgana Lefay

1. "Rooms of Sleep" - 4:57
2. "What Am I" - 5:31
3. "Alley of Oaks" - 5:29
4. "Soldiers of the Holy Empire" - 4:01
5. "Paradise Lost" - 3:56
6. "Nowhere Island" - 5:47
7. "The Mirror" - 5:44
8. "State of Intoxication" - 4:51
9. "Cold World" - 3:57
10. "Lord of the Rings" - 4:25
11. "Last Rites" - 6:26
12. "Dying Evolution" - 3:57
13. "The Secret Doctrine" - 4:16

== Lyrical notes ==
- The lyrics for "Paradise Lost" is based upon the poem Paradise Lost, written by the poet John Milton.
- The lyrics for "Lord of the Rings" is based upon the novel The Lord of the Rings, written by J. R. R. Tolkien.

== Credits ==
- Charles Rytkönen - Vocals
- Tony Eriksson - Guitars
- Tommi Karppanen - Guitars
- Joakim Heder - Bass
- Jonas Söderlind - Drums
