= Blood Fire Death =

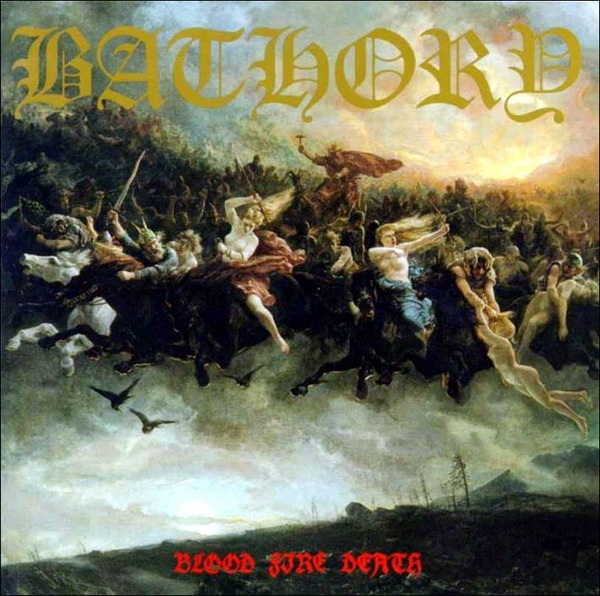

Studio album by Bathory
- Released: 17 October 1988
- Recorded: February 1988
- Studios: Heavenshore Studio, Stockholm, Sweden
- Genres: Black metal; Viking metal
- Length: 45:41
- Labels: Black Mark/Tyfon (Sweden and Germany); Under One Flag (UK); Kraze (US)
- Producers: Boss Forsberg and Quorthon

Bathory chronology
| Under the Sign of the Black Mark (1987) | Blood Fire Death (1988) | Hammerheart (1990) |

Blood Fire Death is the fourth studio album by Swedish extreme metal band Bathory. It was released in October 1988, through Music for Nations sublabel, Under One Flag. This is the first Bathory album that would use anonymous session musicians (credited under the Satanic pseudonyms "Kothaar" and "Vvornth") until Blood on Ice released in 1996.

The album, although mostly black metal, includes some of the first examples of Viking metal. According to the book Black Metal: Evolution of the Cult by Dayal Patterson, Blood Fire Death began a second trilogy, an era Quorthon described as the "pre-Christian Swedish Viking Era".

== Background and recording ==
The lyrics to "For All Those Who Died" were taken from a poem by Erica Jong, first published in her book Witches (1981), while the first three verses of "A Fine Day to Die" are taken from "Cassilda's Song" of Robert W. Chambers' The King in Yellow.

The front cover comes from the painting The Wild Hunt of Odin (1872) by Peter Nicolai Arbo. The painting as well as the opening track "Oden's Ride Over Nordland" use the Wild Hunt motif from folklore. Blood Fire Death established this motif in metal culture, where it since has become popular with a number of bands and event organizers.

Quorthon did not include any explicitly Satanic lyrics, though the songs "The Golden Walls of Heaven" and "Dies Irae" included acrostic poems with Satanic and anti-Christian references.

== Critical reception ==
Professional ratings
Review scores
| Source | Rating |
|---|---|
| AllMusic | 4/5 stars |
| Collector's Guide to Heavy Metal | 6/10 |

Eduardo Rivadavia of AllMusic gave the album a score of four stars out of five. He wrote: "Simply put, Blood Fire Death's lasting legacy of influence cannot be underestimated, and its courageous experiments set the stage for what many consider Bathory's finest hour, the magnificent Hammerheart." In 2009, IGN included Blood Fire Death in their "10 Great Black Metal Albums" list.

In 2013, Decibel ranked Blood Fire Death at number 14 on its list of the Top 100 Black Metal Albums of All Time. In 2023, Rolling Stone listed "A Fine Day to Die" as the 76th-best metal song of all time.

== Track listing ==
All tracks are written by Quorthon.

Side one
| No. | Title | Length |
|---|---|---|
| 1. | "Odens Ride Over Nordland" | 2:59 |
| 2. | "A Fine Day to Die" | 8:35 |
| 3. | "The Golden Walls of Heaven" | 5:22 |
| 4. | "Pace 'Till Death" | 3:39 |
| 5. | "Holocaust" | 3:25 |

Side two
| No. | Title | Length |
|---|---|---|
| 6. | "For All Those Who Died" | 4:57 |
| 7. | "Dies Irae" | 5:11 |
| 8. | "Blood Fire Death" | 10:28 |
| 9. | "Outro" | 0:58 |

Note: The "Outro" is not listed on the cover and is not included on the cassette release.

== Personnel ==
Bathory

- Quorthon – guitars, vocals, percussion, effects, producer, engineer, mixing
- Vvornth – drums
- Kothaar – bass

Production

- Boss (Börje Forsberg) – producer, engineer, mixing
- Peter Nicolai Arbo – album cover painting, The Wild Hunt of Odin (Åsgårdsreien)
- Pelle Matteus – sleeve photography
