= Under the Sign of the Black Mark =

Studio album by Bathory
- Released: 11 May 1987
- Recorded: September 1986
- Studios: Heavenshore Studio, Stockholm
- Genre: Black metal
- Length: 35:56
- Labels: Black Mark/Tyfon (Sweden and Germany); Under One Flag (UK); New Renaissance (US)
- Producers: Boss Forsberg; Quorthon

Bathory chronology
The Return...... (1985)	Under the Sign of the Black Mark (1987)	Blood Fire Death (1988)

Under the Sign of the Black Mark is the third studio album by Swedish extreme metal band Bathory. It was recorded in September 1986 and released on 11 May 1987 through New Renaissance Records and Under One Flag. It was a key album in the development of the black metal genre, and greatly influenced the Norwegian black metal scene that emerged in the early 1990s.

== Background and recording ==
The photograph on the cover was by Gunnar Silins, taken at the Royal Swedish Opera in Stockholm. The model used was Leif Ehrnborg, a then-top class Swedish bodybuilder.

The cover was originally intended to show four women who "sold their soul to the devil"; however, the women did not want to be on the album cover bare-breasted, so their images were removed, which resulted in a "narrowed" cover.

The song "Woman of Dark Desires" is a tribute to the band's namesake, Elizabeth Báthory. "Enter the Eternal Fire" was the band's first epic, reaching nearly seven minutes in length, with lyrics referring to a deal with the Devil. The song "Equimanthorn" makes references to Hell as well as to Norse mythology, including Odin's "eight-legged black stallion" Sleipnir.

"Call from the Grave" was originally written during the Okkulta sessions under the title "The Call From The Grave", but was renamed and used on the album.

== Critical reception and legacy ==
Professional ratings
Review scores
Source	Rating
AllMusic	4.5/5 stars
Kerrang!	4/5 stars
Metal Forces	9.1/10

In 2003, Under the Sign of the Black Mark was named one of "The Best 25 Heavy Metal Albums of All Time" in Sound of the Beast: The Complete Headbanging History of Heavy Metal, by Ian Christe.

Eduardo Rivadavia of AllMusic wrote that the album "remains a career highlight for Bathory, and a crucial LP for all lovers of extreme metal." Fenriz of Darkthrone called it "the quintessential black metal album". He also cited it as a musical inspiration for the 1995 Darkthrone album Panzerfaust, besides Celtic Frost's Morbid Tales and Vader's Necrolust demo.

On the album's impact, Daniel Ekeroth, author of the book Swedish Death Metal, commented in an interview with Decibel magazine in 2012: "Even by Bathory's standards, this was a masterpiece, on par with both Bonded by Blood and Reign in Blood. The songs were perfected, and the sound more atmospheric and uncanny than before. Bathory were now the most extreme and one of the very best metal bands out there."

The song "Call from the Grave" was featured in the 2009 expansions to Grand Theft Auto IV, Grand Theft Auto IV: The Lost and Damned and Grand Theft Auto: The Ballad of Gay Tony.

In 2013, Decibel crowned Under the Sign of the Black Mark as the greatest black metal album of all time. In 2017, Rolling Stone ranked Under the Sign of the Black Mark at number 81 on their list of 'The 100 Greatest Metal Albums of All Time.'

Phil Anselmo of Pantera covered the song "Massacre" with his side project Scour.

== Track listing ==
All tracks are written by Quorthon.

Side Darkness
No.	Title	Length
1.	"Nocternal Obeisance"	1:28
2.	"Massacre"	2:38
3.	"Woman of Dark Desires"	4:06
4.	"Call from the Grave"	4:53
5.	"Equimanthorn"	3:41

Side Evil
No.	Title	Length
6.	"Enter the Eternal Fire"	6:57
7.	"Chariots of Fire"	2:46
8.	"13 Candles"	5:17
9.	"Of Doom......"	3:45
10.	"Outro"	0:25
Total length:		35:56

Outro track introduced on 2003 remastered edition.

== Personnel ==
Bathory

- Quorthon – guitar, vocals, bass guitar, drums, synthesizer, producer, mixing, cover design
- Christer Sandström – additional bass guitar
- Paul Pålle Lundberg – drums (Note: While Quorthon mentions his name in some interviews, his father Boss has stated that this person is nonexistent and Quorthon played the drums himself.)

Production

- Boss (Börje Forsberg) – producer, engineer, mixing
