= Call From The Grave =

Call From the Grave may refer to:

- Call From the Grave, an act from The Threepenny Opera
- Call from the Grave, a song by Bathory, from the album Under the Sign of the Black Mark
