= Nordland II =

Studio album by Bathory
- Released: 31 March 2003
- Recorded: July–September 2002
- Genre: Viking metal
- Length: 63:23
- Label: Black Mark
- Producer: Borje Forsberg, Quorthon

Bathory chronology
| Nordland I (2002) | Nordland II (2003) |

Professional ratings
Review scores
| Source | Rating |
|---|---|
| AllMusic | 3/5 stars |
| Chronicles of Chaos | 5/10 |

Nordland II is the twelfth and final studio album by Swedish extreme metal band Bathory. It is the successor to Nordland I. It was released on 31 March 2003 (just over a year before Quorthon's unexpected death), through Black Mark Production.

It was also released as a limited digipak.

== Track listing ==
All tracks are written by Quorthon.

| No. | Title | Length |
|---|---|---|
| 1. | "Fanfare" | 3:37 |
| 2. | "Blooded Shore" | 5:46 |
| 3. | "Sea Wolf" | 5:26 |
| 4. | "Vinland" | 6:39 |
| 5. | "The Land" | 6:23 |
| 6. | "Death and Resurrection of a Northern Son" | 8:30 |
| 7. | "The Messenger" | 10:02 |
| 8. | "Flash of the Silverhammer" | 4:09 |
| 9. | "The Wheel of Sun" | 12:27 |
| 10. | "Outro" | 0:24 |
| Total length: | | 63:23 |

== Personnel ==
- Quorthon – vocals, all instruments
- Kristian Wåhlin – album cover artwork
