= Aberrations of the Mind =

Studio album by Morgana Lefay
- Released: 19 March 2007
- Recorded: Studio Soundcreation, Bollnäs
- Genres: Thrash metal, heavy metal, power metal
- Label: Black Mark Records
- Producers: Morgana Lefay and Per Ryberg

Morgana Lefay chronology
Grand Materia (2005)	Aberrations of the Mind (2007)

Aberrations of the Mind is the tenth and final album by Swedish heavy metal band Morgana Lefay, released 19 March 2007. It was their first album with Pelle Åkerlind on drums.

The original name was Primal Chaos, which was changed to Aberrations of the Mind during the winter of 2007.

The album received reviews of 8/10 from Rockhard.de, as well as reviews from Terrorverlag and Powermetal.de.

== Track listing ==
All music and lyrics written by Morgana Lefay.

1. "Delusions" – 3:14
2. "Make a Wish" – 3:18
3. "The Rush of Possession" – 3:57
4. "Depression" – 4:18
5. "Caught in the Treadwheel" – 3:55
6. "Reflections of War" – 3:46
7. "Face of Fear" – 3:23
8. "Where I Rule" – 3:36
9. "In Shadows I Reign" – 4:31
10. "Aberration of Mind" – 4:00
11. "Vultures Devouring" – 3:34
12. "Over and Over Again" – 5:54

The digipak version of the album has the song "Nightmares Are Made in Hell" as a bonus track.

== Credits ==
- Charles Rytkönen – vocals
- Tony Eriksson – guitars
- Peter Grehn – guitars
- Fredrik Lundberg – bass
- Pelle Åkerlind – drums
