= Scour (band) =

American extreme metal band

- Origin: United States
- Genres: Black metal; death metal; grindcore
- Years active: 2015–present
- Labels: Housecore; Nuclear Blast
- Members: Philip H. Anselmo; John Jarvis; Derek Engemann; Mark Kloeppel; Adam Jarvis
- Past members: Jesse Schobel; Chase Fraser
- Website: scourofficial.com

Scour is an American black metal supergroup formed in 2015. It features vocalist Phil Anselmo (Pantera, Down), guitarists Derek Engemann (ex-Cattle Decapitation) and Mark Kloeppel (Misery Index), bassist John Jarvis (Agoraphobic Nosebleed, Nest, ex-Pig Destroyer), and drummer Adam Jarvis (Pig Destroyer, Misery Index, Nailbomb).

== History ==
Scour's original lineup featured Anselmo, guitarist Derek Engemann, guitarist Chase Fraser, bassist John Jarvis, and drummer Jesse Schobel.

The band debuted with the single "Dispatched" in 2016. That year, they released their first EP, The Grey EP, through Anselmo's Housecore Records. The group's second extended play, The Red EP, followed in 2017. The title track and the song "Piles" were available for streaming ahead of the EP release.

After a hiatus, Scour returned in 2020 with The Black EP on Housecore Records and Nuclear Blast. Released on November 27, 2020, the EP featured guest appearances from Erik Rutan (Hate Eternal, Cannibal Corpse), Pat O'Brien (ex-Cannibal Corpse), and actor Jason Momoa guesting vocals on one track. Ahead of the EP's release, Scour released the Bathory cover "Massacre" as a single.

In 2024, the band announced their first full-length album, Gold, including a guest solo by Gary Holt (Slayer, Exodus) on "Coin". They began recording in February 2023 at Anselmo's Nodferatu's Lair studio, and released the album on February 21, 2025. Gold received positive reviews in the metal press, which called it "an absolute black metal masterpiece" (Metal Injection), "an authentic vision for modern American Black Metal" (This is Black Metal), and "a masterclass in sonic annihilation" (Antihero).

Scour has performed at Roskilde, Hellfest, Tecate Metal Fest, and Maryland Deathfest.

== Musical style ==
Scour is stylistically black metal, with the exception of Phil Anselmo's use of lower growling instead of the higher, raspier vocals commonly associated with the genre. Anselmo called the group's sound "modern, thrashy black metal", saying that he wants to "put [his] own spin on it" and that he does not "have to sound like [Infernus] from Gorgoroth to get the point across. There's other ways of singing over that style of music". James Christopher Monger of AllMusic described the band's sound as a "punishing mix of black metal, grindcore, and thrash". Metal Insider called Scour a death metal band.

== Members ==
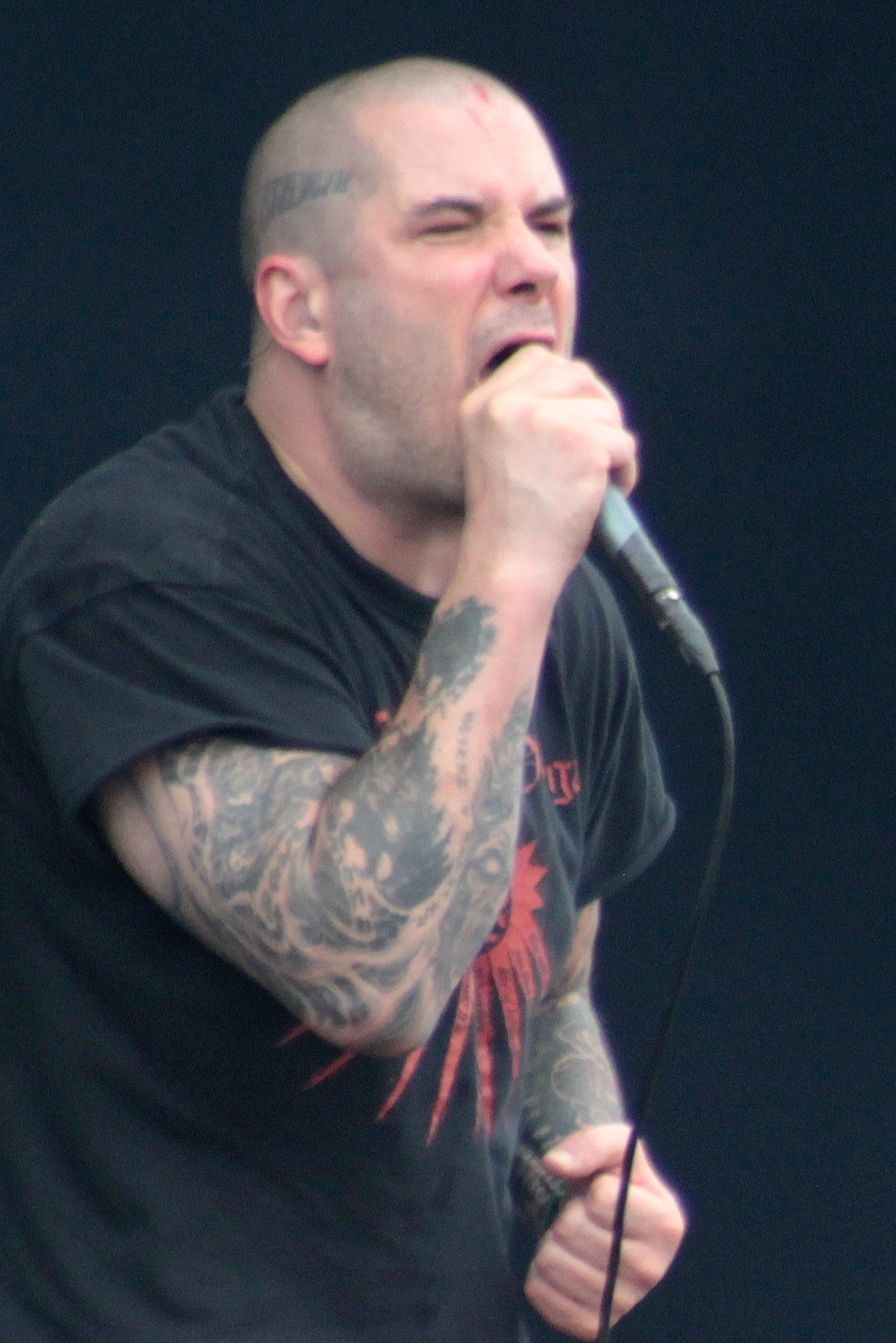
Phil Anselmo

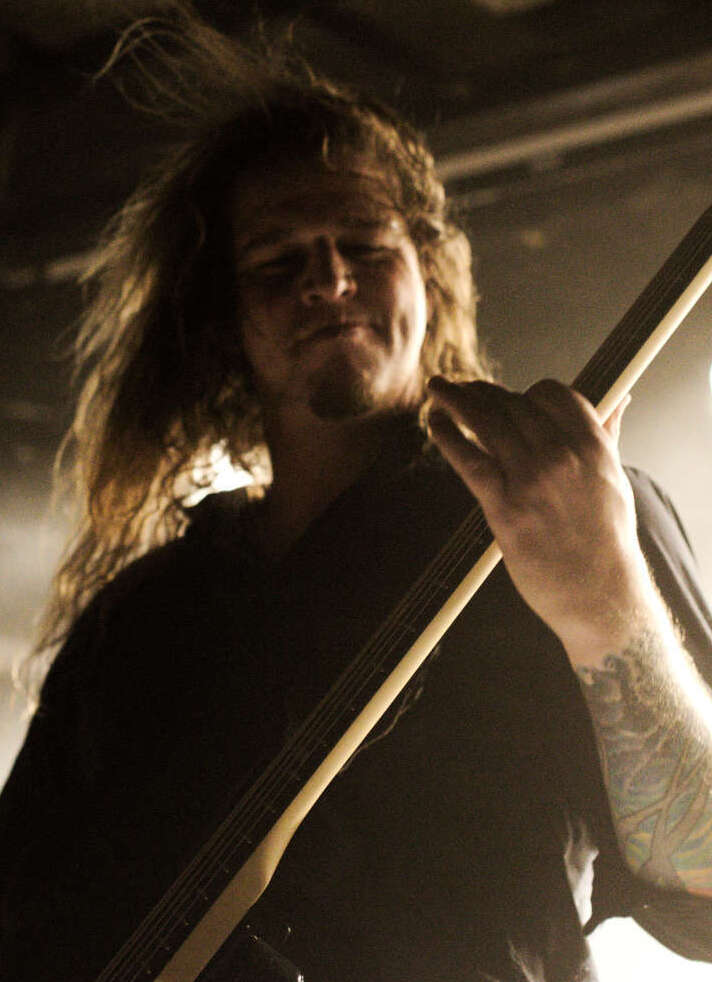
Derek Engemann

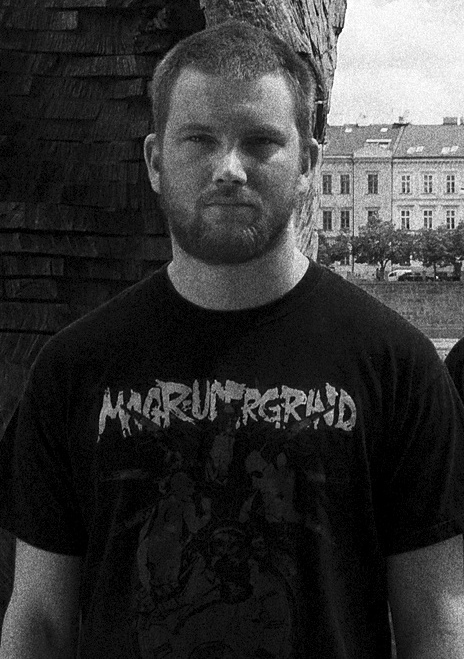
Mark Kloeppel

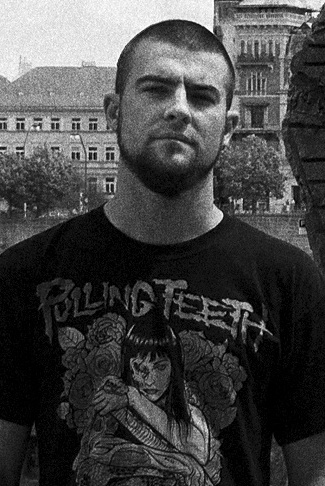
Adam Jarvis

=== Current ===
- Philip H. Anselmo – lead vocals (2015–present)
- John Jarvis – bass, backing vocals (2015–present)
- Derek Engemann – guitars, backing vocals (2015–present)
- Mark Kloeppel – guitars, backing vocals (2017–present)
- Adam Jarvis – drums (2017–present)

=== Former ===
- Jesse Schobel – drums (2015–2017)
- Chase Fraser – guitars (2015–2017)

== Discography ==
Studio albums

- Gold (2025, Nuclear Blast)

EPs

- Grey EP (2016, Housecore)
- Red EP (2017, Housecore)
- Black EP (2020, Housecore, Nuclear Blast)

Singles

- "Massacre" (Bathory cover, 2019)
