= Nordland I =

Studio album by Bathory
- Released: 18 November 2002
- Recorded: July–September 2002
- Genre: Viking metal
- Length: 59:21
- Label: Black Mark
- Producer: Borje Forsberg, Quorthon

Bathory chronology
| Destroyer of Worlds (2001) | Nordland I (2002) | Nordland II (2003) |

Professional ratings
Review scores
| Source | Rating |
|---|---|
| AllMusic | 3/5 stars |
| Chronicles of Chaos | 6/10 |

Nordland I is the eleventh studio album by Swedish extreme metal band Bathory. It was released on 18 November 2002 through Black Mark Production. It is a return to the Viking metal of Bathory's middle period, and features songs mainly concerning Norse mythology.

== Track listing ==
All tracks are written by Quorthon.

| No. | Title | Length |
|---|---|---|
| 1. | "Prelude" | 2:35 |
| 2. | "Nordland" | 9:21 |
| 3. | "Vinterblot" | 5:17 |
| 4. | "Dragons Breath" | 6:45 |
| 5. | "Ring of Gold" | 5:35 |
| 6. | "Foreverdark Woods" | 8:06 |
| 7. | "Broken Sword" | 5:35 |
| 8. | "Great Hall Awaits a Fallen Brother" | 8:17 |
| 9. | "Mother Earth Father Thunder" | 5:38 |
| 10. | "Heimfard" | 2:12 |
| Total length: | | 59:21 |

== Personnel ==
- Quorthon – vocals, all instruments
- Kristian Wåhlin – album cover artwork
