= Hammerheart =

Studio album by Bathory
- Released: 23 April 1990
- Recorded: June – August 1989
- Studios: Heavenshore Studio in Stockholm, Sweden
- Genre: Viking metal
- Length: 55:46
- Label: Noise
- Producers: Boss Forsberg and Quorthon

Bathory chronology
Blood Fire Death (1988)	Hammerheart (1990)	Twilight of the Gods (1991)

Hammerheart is the fifth studio album by Swedish extreme metal band Bathory. Regarded one of the band's most progressive works, it continued the previous album Blood Fire Death's transition away from black metal to what became recognized as Viking metal, and is considered a cornerstone work of the genre. A music video was made for "One Rode to Asa Bay."

== Background and composition ==
Quorthon dedicated the song "One Rode to Asa Bay", about the Christianization of Scandinavia, to C. Dean Andersson, who had earlier sent some of his books to Quorthon. The village's name in the song, Asa Bay, comes from the pseudonym Asa Drake which Andersson used in some of his books.

Quorthon was dissatisfied with the music video for the song, as the band had recorded "14 hours of film" and were only given a rough mix of the music video. One of the songs on the album, "Valhalla", was originally written during the sessions for a double album that had the tentative title of the same name, with one album featuring Viking metal and another in the speed metal style.

== Reception ==
Professional ratings
Review scores
Source	Rating
AllMusic	4/5 stars
Collector's Guide to Heavy Metal	8/10

AllMusic called the album an "unqualified triumph for the pioneering Swedish act." In 2013, Decibel ranked Hammerheart at number 30 on its list of the Top 100 Black Metal Albums of All Time.

== Track listing ==
All tracks are written by Quorthon.

No.	Title	Length
1.	"Shores in Flames"	11:07
2.	"Valhalla"	9:33
3.	"Baptised in Fire and Ice"	7:57
4.	"Father to Son"	6:28
5.	"Song to Hall Up High"	2:30
6.	"Home of Once Brave"	6:43
7.	"One Rode to Asa Bay"	9:09
8.	"Outro"	0:23

The 2003 remastered edition combines tracks 5 and 6.

== Personnel ==
Bathory

- Quorthon – lead and backing vocals, electric and acoustic guitars, keyboards, synthesizers, special effects
- Kothaar – bass guitar (Note: Quorthon stated in a 2003 interview that he believed that he played the bass on the album)
- Vvornth – drums, percussion

Note:

The credited names "Kothaar" and "Vvornth" are pseudonyms used by various guest studio musicians, who played anonymously on several Bathory albums from 1988 to 1996.

Production

- Black Mark Production – executive production
- Quorthon – arrangement
- Quorthon and Tomas "Boss" Forsberg – production, recording, mixing
- Black Mark Production – publishing
- Julia Schechner – album design
- Sir Frank Dicksee – cover artwork, The Funeral of a Viking (provided by Manchester City Art Gallery)

== Cultural impact ==
HammerHeart Brewing Co. is a brewery located in Lino Lakes, Minnesota whose name and branding was influenced by the album. According to co-founder Nathaniel Chapman, “All of our beer names are inspired by Norwegian lore and we want to keep that attitude.” The themes of the brewery and its beer are focused on Norse and Celtic mythology, and heavy metal music.
