= Blood on Ice =

Studio album by Bathory
- Released: 10 June 1996
- Recorded: February 1988 – June 1989 (demo tape); June–July 1995
- Genre: Viking metal
- Length: 53:40
- Label: Black Mark
- Producer: Quorthon, "Boss" Forsberg

Bathory chronology
Octagon (1995)	Blood on Ice (1996)	Destroyer of Worlds (2001)

Blood on Ice is the ninth studio album by Swedish extreme metal band Bathory. It was released in June 1996, through Black Mark Production. It is a concept album. This is the final Bathory album that would use anonymous session musicians (credited under the Satanic pseudonyms "Kothaar" and "Vvornth" since Blood Fire Death released in 1988), as Quorthon would track all instruments on the following albums.

Professional ratings
Review scores
Source	Rating
AllMusic	4/5 stars
Chronicles of Chaos	9/10
Collector's Guide to Heavy Metal	8/10

== Background ==
The master tapes were recorded in 1989, but the album was not immediately released, both because the album was never properly finished, and because founder and songwriter Quorthon was worried that it presented too drastic a departure from the band's previous black metal sound. It was eventually released, after remastering and re-editing on more advanced studio equipment, in 1996, partly through fan pressure resulting from his mentioning of the project in an interview. Quorthon expands on this, as well as more specific matters about the recording of Blood on Ice and many of the other early Bathory albums in his liner notes for this release. The album's plot follows ideas and formats typical of the sagas, but was written by Quorthon himself. The album cover is drawn by Kristian Wåhlin.

== Storyline ==
The anonymous central character, aged ten when the tale begins, is the sole survivor of a raid by twenty black-clad horsemen bearing the banner of the 'twin-headed Beast' against his village. All the men are slain, and the women and children carried off to the far North, whilst the central character survives by hiding in a tree. He spends fifteen years alone in the wilderness, where he grows strong and learns the ways of the forest, the memories of the atrocities he has witnessed galvanising him. Then, one day, he meets a one-eyed old man (most probably Odin, although the tale always refers to him merely as 'One-Eyed Old Man') who tells him that he has foreseen his coming for a thousand years, and that he has been chosen as a champion of the Gods to fight their battle in the shadows beyond his world. To this end he will be granted a number of mighty artifacts and abilities, and be trained for a hundred days and nights by the old man. The first of these artifacts is a mighty sword (probably Tyrfing), forged in the dawn of the world, and the second given in a song is a mighty, eight-legged stallion ridden by 'his father's God' (Sleipnir, Odin's steed).

He will also be guided by two ravens (Huginn and Muninn), and is granted a number of supernatural powers: first, the woodwoman, a witch, takes his heart, for which price he can withstand any cut or slit. Then he travels to the bottomless lake in which all the knowledge of the worlds, old and new, is stored. The old man cast his left eye into the lake in order to give him his powers of wisdom and foresight (making the lake roughly analogous to Mimir's well), and the central character casts both his eyes into the lake, which not only means he gains all its powers of knowledge and vision, but also that he will not have to stare down the Beast during his final battle. He rides North, guided by the ravens and by the ancient Gods, to confront his destiny. He charges down the gates of Hel and defeats the Beast in combat, as well as freeing the souls of those that had been held captive here, riding with them to Valhalla.

== Track listing ==
All tracks are written by Quorthon.

No.	Title	Length
1.	"Intro"	1:45
2.	"Blood on Ice"	5:41
3.	"Man of Iron"	2:48
4.	"One Eyed Old Man"	4:21
5.	"The Sword"	4:08
6.	"The Stallion"	5:13
7.	"The Woodwoman"	6:18
8.	"The Lake"	6:42
9.	"Gods of Thunder of Wind and of Rain"	5:42
10.	"The Ravens"	1:09
11.	"The Revenge of the Blood on Ice"	9:53
Total length:		53:40

== Personnel ==
Bathory

- Quorthon – vocals, guitar
- Kothaar – bass guitar
- Vvornth – drums

Art

- Kristian Wåhlin – album cover artwork
