= The Return...... =

Second studio album by Bathory

The Return……

Studio album by Bathory
- Released: 27 May 1985
- Recorded: February 1985
- Studios: Electra Studios, Stockholm, Sweden
- Genre: Black metal
- Length: 36:41
- Label: Black Mark
- Producers: Quorthon, Boss

Bathory chronology
Bathory (1984)	The Return…… (1985)	Under the Sign of the Black Mark (1987)

The Return…… (full title The Return of the Darkness and Evil) is the second studio album by Swedish extreme metal band Bathory. It was released on 27 May 1985, through Black Mark in Sweden and Combat Records in the US. The Return…… had a significant influence on developing the black metal and death metal genres.

== Background and recording ==
Quorthon explained the album title as such: "We wanted people to just read out The Return…… – as in a second album or a follow-up – and then flip the album over to look for a tracking list. Not finding one, what they got was this apocalyptic poem with the song titles woven into it. Only after listening through the album to the end would you get the full title of the album, The Return of the Darkness and Evil". The initial bassist, Andreas Johansson, was let go during the recording sessions, as Quorthon found him doing speed. Quorthon played the rest of the basslines himself.

One of the songs from the album, Born for Burning, was a reworked version of one of the earliest Bathory songs, Live in Sin.

== Music ==
The staff of Invisible Oranges described the sound on The Return as "100% pure Venom worship, with everything from lyrics to riffs to titles swiped in part to make up the whole of the contents."

== Reception ==
Professional ratings
Review scores
Source	Rating
AllMusic	3.5/5 stars
Collector's Guide to Heavy Metal	5/10

Since its release, the album has received acclaim as a landmark of the first wave of black metal, along with their self titled-debut and third album, Under the Sign of the Black Mark. Eduardo Rivadavia of AllMusic wrote of the album, "Like their eponymous debut of a year before, Bathory's 1985 sophomore effort, The Return......, was an unbelievably coarse proto-black metal album influenced almost exclusively by the earlier works of Venom. But make no mistake: such was the genre's state of infancy at the time that, even though it was once again recorded under the most inadequate of circumstances at the auto repair garage Quorthon sympathetically baptized Heavenshore Studios, the album's impact still proved nothing short of revolutionary."

In various interviews, Fenriz of Darkthrone praised the album and defined it as "the essence of black metal".

According to the staff of Invisible Oranges: "The Return features some of the absolute worst drumming ever released by a legitimate record label. The fast middle section of 'The Rite of Darkness' even surpasses Mike Sus’ horrid timekeeping on Possessed’s debut. Legend has it that Bathory mastermind Quorthon was so drunk during the recording of this record that he couldn’t remember even doing it. It definitely sounds like a blackout drunk performed the pedestrian plodding and manic flailing to be found all over this record."

In 2013, Decibel ranked it at number 39 on its list of the Top 100 Black Metal Albums of All Time.

== Track listing ==
All tracks are written by Quorthon.

Side 'Darkness'
No.	Title	Length
1.	"Revelation of Doom"	3:27
2.	"Total Destruction"	3:50
3.	"Born for Burning"	5:13
4.	"The Wind of Mayhem"	3:13
5.	"Bestial Lust (Bitch)"	2:41

Side 'Evil'
No.	Title	Length
6.	"Possessed"	2:42
7.	"The Rite of Darkness"	2:05
8.	"Reap of Evil"	3:28
9.	"Son of the Damned"	2:48
10.	"Sadist (Tormentor)"	3:00
11.	"The Return of the Darkness and Evil"	3:49
12.	"Outro"	0:25
Total length:		36:41

The 2003 remastered edition combines tracks 1 and 2, and tracks 7 and 8, as well as adds the final Outro track.

== Personnel ==
=== Bathory ===
- Quorthon (Thomas Börje Forsberg) – guitars, vocals, additional bass, production, cover design, back cover photography
- Andreas Johansson – bass, back cover photography
- Stefan Larsson – drums, back cover photography

=== Production ===
- Boss (Börje Forsberg) – production, recording, mixing
- Gunnar Silins – front cover photography
