= Destroyer of Worlds =

Destroyer of Worlds may refer to:

- Destroyer of Worlds (album), a 2001 album by Swedish extreme metal band Bathory
- Destroyer of Worlds (novel), a 2009 science fiction novel by Larry Niven and Edward M. Lerner
- Destroyer of Worlds, a 2020 fantasy novel by Larry Correia
- Destroyer of Worlds (3 Body Problem), a TV episode
- "Destroyer of Worlds", a character from Regular Show
- "Now I am become Death, the destroyer of worlds.", a variant translation of verse 11.32 of the Bhagavad Gita
  - quoted by J. Robert Oppenheimer in a 1965 television documentary about the atomic bomb
