= The Wild Hunt of Odin =

Painting by Peter Nicolai Arbo

- Åsgårdsreien (Norwegian)
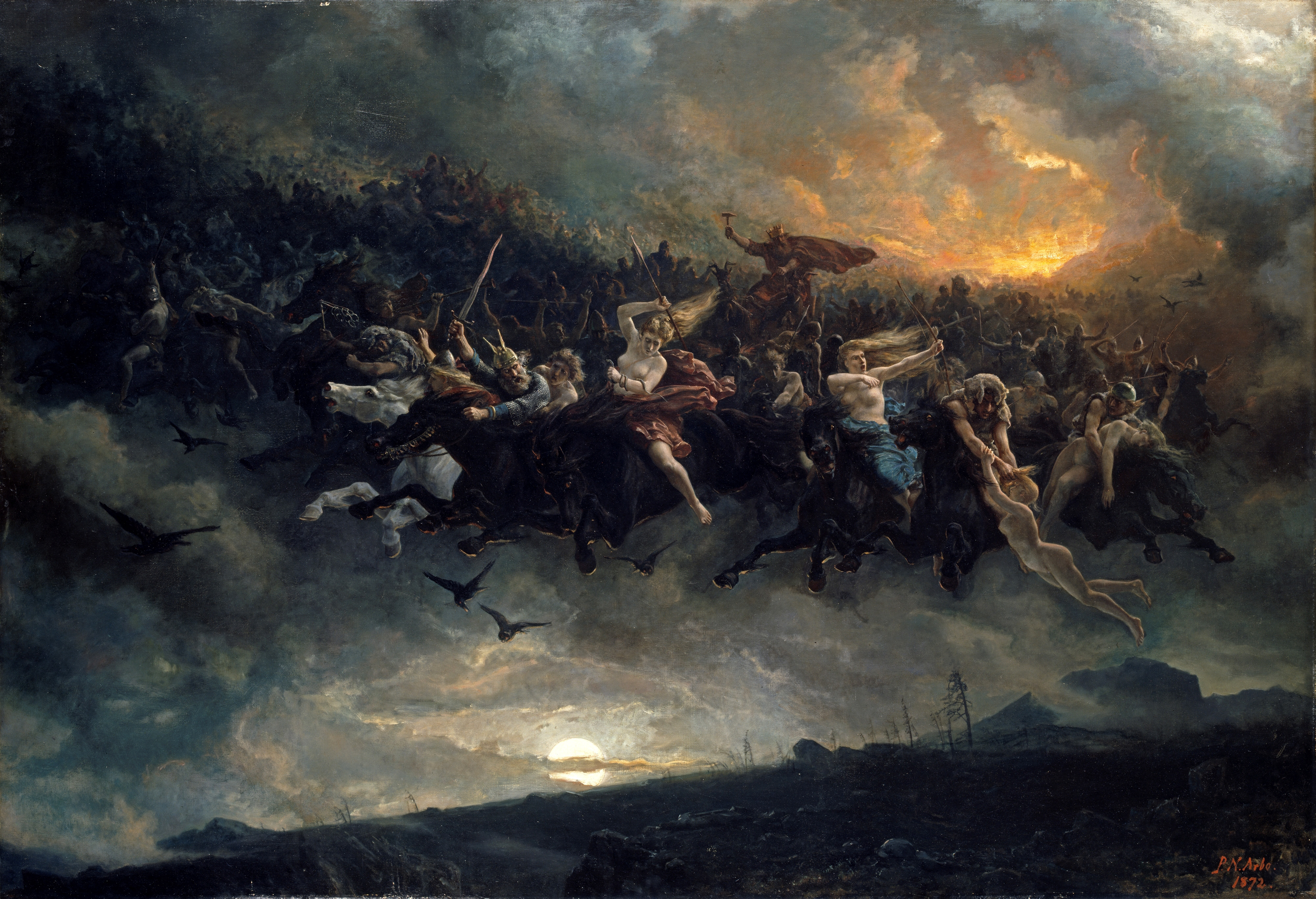
- Artist: Peter Nicolai Arbo
- Year: 1872
- Medium: Oil on canvas
- Dimensions: 166 cm × 240.5 cm (65 in × 94.7 in)
- Location: National Museum of Art, Architecture and Design, Oslo
- Website: Nasjonalmuseet Collection online

The Wild Hunt of Odin (Norwegian: Åsgårdsreien, lit. 'The Ride of Asgard') is an 1872 painting by Peter Nicolai Arbo. It depicts the Wild Hunt from Scandinavian folklore and is based on a poem by Johan Sebastian Welhaven. The painting is in the collection of the National Museum of Art, Architecture and Design in Oslo.

== Background ==
The Wild Hunt of Odin is based on the Wild Hunt motif from folklore. In the Scandinavian tradition, the Wild Hunt is often associated with the god Odin. It consists of a terrifying procession that hurl across the sky during midwinter and abduct unfortunate people who have failed to find a hiding place. In the Norwegian material, figures other than Odin who have been named as leaders of the hunt include Guro Rysserova, a supernatural female being with a mysterious male companion. The folklorist Christine N. F. Eike has argued that the motif might have its origin in European traditions where young, unmarried men wear masks and move in processions during Christmastide.

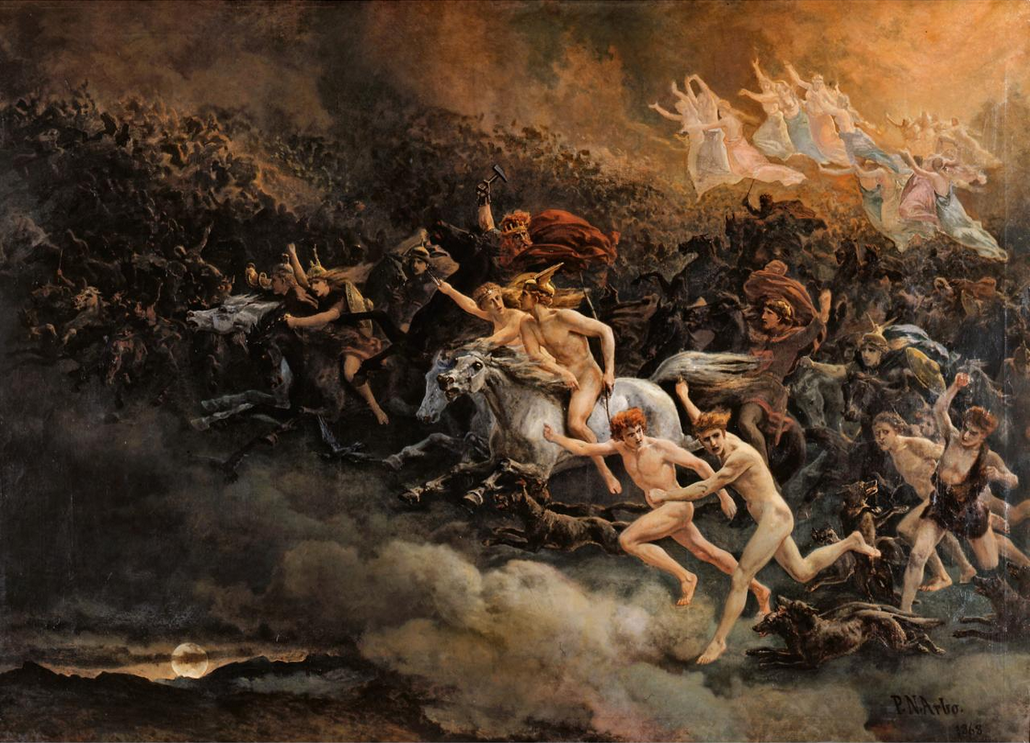
The Wild Hunt of Odin, 1868. Oil on canvas, 169 × 241 cm.

Peter Nicolai Arbo (1831 – 1892) belonged to a group of Late Romantic Scandinavian painters who had inherited an interest in Norse mythology from the early 19th-century Romantics. The most prominent painters in this group were the Norwegian Arbo and the Swedes Mårten Eskil Winge (1825 – 1896) and August Malmström (1829 – 1901). In accordance with writers like Adam Oehlenschläger and N. F. S. Grundtvig, they viewed their mythological paintings as ethical allegories and not as representations of real deities. In modern culture, the Wild Hunt had been popularized by Jacob Grimm, who in Deutsche Mythologie (1835) presented it as a pagan element that survived into Christian times, where it had been adapted into a demonic phenomenon. It had been used by 19th-century continental painters such as Joseph von Führich and Rudolf Henneberg, whose works Arbo was familiar with. It is also likely that Arbo was familiar with writings about the Wild Hunt by the Norwegian folklorist Peter Christen Asbjørnsen. Arbo depicted the Wild Hunt several times and made a first oil painting of it in 1868. The 1868 version, which shows the hunters in profile, is owned by the Drammen Museum and is on a long-term loan to Nordnorsk Kunstmuseum in Tromsø.

== Subject and composition ==
The Wild Hunt of Odin shows a hunting party of airborne horsemen who move across a dark sky. They are accompanied by ravens and owls and seem to emerge from clouds in the background. All horses are black except for one white horse at the front. Spearheading the hunt is a helmeted man, possibly Sigurd, and two bare-breasted valkyries. The rest of the hunters appear to be men, with the addition of three captured nude women. The party members are armed with spears and other weapons. Two men at the front wear pelts over their heads, indicating they are berserkers. Behind the immediate frontline, the hunt is led by the god Thor, who towers above the rest in his chariot pulled by two goats, raising his war hammer and wearing a crown.

The Wild Hunt of Odin was painted in Paris in 1872. Most directly, it is based on Johan Sebastian Welhaven's poem Asgaardsreien, with the opening "Through the nightly air stampedes a train of frothing black horses". The poem is about a Christmas wedding that turns violent and is visited by the Wild Hunt. The painting's compositional arrangement, with its diagonal movements, is close to Arbo's Kunstakademie Düsseldorf work Saint Olav at the Battle of Stiklestad (1859). Another visual influence was Bråvallaslaget (1860–62) by Malmström, which depicts the Norse gods in the sky above a battlefield. The way the mythological subjects are treated aligns with Johann Joachim Winckelmann's position, which stated that Germanic deities should be depicted according to the conventions of Greco-Roman subjects. As a consequence, Arbo's Thor wears a crown, and his hammer looks different from historical Scandinavian depictions. The valkyries are half nude and have untamed hair, whereas in Old Norse poetry they are described as wearing their hair pulled back and carrying horns of ale.

== Reception ==
The Wild Hunt of Odin was first shown in public at Copenhagen's Nordic Exhibition of 1872, where it was presented along with Thor's Fight with the Giants by Winge. The National Museum in Oslo bought Arbo's painting the same year.

By 1872, the depiction of Norse myths was largely out of fashion among art critics, who had more enthusiasm for Realism. In his review from the Nordic Exhibition, the critic Julius Lange dismissed Arbo's and Winge's mythological works as "ghosts and bogeymen".

Over time, The Wild Hunt of Odin has been among Arbo's most celebrated works. Norsk kunstnerleksikon described it in 2013 as his "chief work" and complimented its "true, dramatic pathos" and "rich and imaginative composition".

== Legacy ==
The Swedish black metal band Bathory used The Wild Hunt of Odin on the cover of the album Blood Fire Death (1988). This established the Wild Hunt as a popular motif in metal music in general and black metal and pagan metal in particular.

== See also ==
- Düsseldorf school of painting
