= Grand Materia =

Studio album by Morgana Lefay
- Released: April 2005
- Recorded: Studio Soundcreation, Bollnäs
- Genres: Heavy metal, thrash metal, power metal
- Length: 60:18
- Label: Black Mark Records
- Producers: Peter Grehn, Per Ryberg

Morgana Lefay chronology
S.O.S (2000)	Grand Materia (2005)	Aberrations of the Mind (2007)

Grand Materia is the ninth studio album by Swedish heavy metal band Morgana Lefay, released in 2005.

In Norway, Scream gave the record the highest grade, 6 out of 6. Grand Materia was a "knockout of everything they have done so far", "consummate", "mighty", "solid" and a "masterpiece" that set Morgana Lefay apart in "the history of Scandinavian music". Charles Rytkönen was "one of the decidedly best vocalists in Europe", and the new songwriter Peter Grehn had done "magnificent work. The album received reviews of 8.5 from Rockhard.de 8/10 from the Swedish webzine Metal Central, as well as reviews from Terrorverlag and Powermetal.de.

== Track listing ==
All songs composed by Morgana Lefay. Lyrical concept by Charles Rytkönen.

1. Grand Materia – 5:47
2. My Funeral Is Calling – 6:25
3. Only Endless Time Remains – 4:24
4. Hollow – 4:07
5. Edge of Mind – 3:54
6. On the Other Side – 5:08
7. I Roam – 3:39
8. Emotional Sanctuary – 6:17
9. Angel's Deceit – 4:48
10. The Operation of the Sun – 4:27
11. Blind – 4:24
12. My Task Is Done – 6:19

The double vinyl version of the album has the song "Sangreal" as a bonus track.

== Credits ==
- Charles Rytkönen – vocals
- Tony Eriksson – guitar
- Peter Grehn – guitar & backing vocals
- Fredrik Lundberg – bass & backing vocals
- Robin Engström – drums
