= Maleficium (album) =

Studio album by Morgana Lefay
- Released: 5 November 1996
- Recorded: Wavestation L.A., Sweden
- Genre: Heavy metal, power metal, thrash metal, groove metal
- Length: 64:43
- Label: Black Mark Records
- Producer: Morgana Lefay and Ulf Peterson

Morgana Lefay chronology
Sanctified (1995)	Maleficium (1996)	Fata Morgana (1998)

Maleficium is the fifth studio album by Swedish heavy metal band Morgana Lefay.

The album received reviews of 4/5 from AllMusic, 8/10 from Metal Storm, 88/100 from Metallized.it, and 9/10 from Rockhard.de. In the Swedish mainstream press, the album got 3/5 in Aftonbladet and a score of "3 wasps" in Expressen.

== Track listing ==
All music and lyrics by Morgana Lefay, except "Nemesis" by Thomas Persson.

1. The Chamber of Confession – 2:15
2. The Source of Pain – 5:26
3. Victim of the Inquisition – 4:55
4. Madness – 6:58
5. A Final Farewell – 6:35
6. Maleficium – 5:37
7. It – 1:29
8. Master of the Masquerade – 4:39
9. Witches Garden – 4:31
10. Dragons Lair – 4:16
11. The Devil in Me – 6:34
12. Where Fallen Angels Rule – 4:00
13. Creatures of the Hierarchy – 5:08
14. Nemesis – 2:20

Total length = 64:43

== Credits ==
- Charles Rytkönen – vocals
- Tony Eriksson – guitar
- Daniel Persson – guitar
- Joakim Heder – bass
- Jonas Söderlind – drums
