= Knowing Just as I =

Knowing Just As I

Studio album by Morgana Lefay
- Released: 1993
- Recorded: FS-Studio, Söderhamn, Sweden
- Genre: Heavy metal Power metal
- Label: Black Mark Records
- Producer: Morgana Lefay & Bror Törnell

Morgana Lefay chronology
Symphony of the Damned (1990)	Knowing Just As I (1993)	The Secret Doctrine (1993)

Knowing Just As I is the second album for Swedish heavy metal band Morgana Lefay.

Morgana Lefay self-released the demo Rumours of Rain. This was picked up by Black Mark Records and released as-is, except for one new song, "Knowing Just as I", which also became the album title.

The cover was painted by Kristian Wåhlin. The cover for Knowing Just as I was among the pieced exhibited in Bollnäs in 2015.

== Reception ==
In Sweden, Expressen gave the album 4 out of 5. This "untrendy, dark, beautiful metal of high class" utilized the horror of King Diamond, the melancholy of Queensrÿche, technique of Testament and heaviness of Metallica, wrote the reviewer. The album was also included on the "Best Right Now" list together with Clawfinger and Rage Against the Machine.

In Rock Hard Magazine, the reviewer called Knowing Just As I "a really nice, traditional speed album" and likened it to the music of Artillery, Iced Earth and Heathen. The reviewer further stated that Knowing Just As I filled a gap that had been forming since Heathen released Victims of Deception. At the same time, Morgana Lefay managed to employ "their own touch", wrote varied songs as to tempo and mood, and were "extremely good at playing their instruments". The low point of the album was the Nazareth cover "Razamanaz", which was "rather botched". Nonetheless, the reviewer gave an 8.5 out of 10 score. It was also reviewed by Metal Hammer Germany.

== Track listing ==
All music & lyrics written by Morgana Lefay except "Razamanaz" by: McCafferty/Sweet/Charlton/Agnew.

1. Enter the Oblivion - 5:22
2. Red Moon - 6:16
3. Salute the Sage - 3:36
4. Rumours of Rain - 7:25
5. Excalibur - 5:03
6. Modern Devil - 3:23
7. Wonderland - 5:10
8. Razamanaz (Nazareth cover) - 2:44
9. Battle of EverMore - 4:56
10. Knowing Just as I - 1:35

== Credits ==
- Charles Rytkönen: Vocals
- Tony Eriksson: Guitars
- Tommi Karppanen: Guitars
- Joakim Heder: Bass
- Jonas Söderlind: Drums
- Joakim Lundberg: Bass on tracks 2, 3, 7, 9
