= Sanctified =

Sanctified may refer to:

- Sanctification, the process of making holy

== Music ==
=== Albums ===
- Sanctified, by the Rance Allen Group, 1975
- Sanctified (album), by Morgana Lefay, 1995

=== Songs ===
- "Sanctified", by Nine Inch Nails from Pretty Hate Machine, 1989
- "Sanctified", by the Communards from Communards, 2012 reissue
- "Sanctified" (song), by Rick Ross featuring Big Sean and Kanye West, 2014
- "Sanctified", by the Veronicas from The Veronicas, 2014

== Other uses ==
- "Sanctified" (Ozark), a television episode
