= The Seventh Seal (Morgana Lefay album) =

- Cover art by Kristian Wåhlin

Studio album by Lefay
- Released: 20 July 1999
- Recorded: Wavestation L.A., Sweden
- Genres: Heavy metal, power metal, progressive metal
- Length: 53:48
- Label: Noise
- Producers: Lefay & Ulf Peterson

Lefay chronology
Fata Morgana (1998)	The Seventh Seal (1999)	Symphony of the Damned, Re-symphonised (1999)

The Seventh Seal is the seventh album for Swedish heavy metal band Morgana Lefay, at the time named Lefay.

Rock Hard praised the album in a 9 out of 10-point review. Technically, the members performed "highly imaginative guitar work and sophisticated vocal lines", combining into a "truly impressive performance". The band steered clear of clichés and managed to write varied songs "encompassing all the shades of" the power metal genre.

Steve Huey of AllMusic stated that the album is "stylistically similar to the original band's blend of British power-metal, orchestrated progressive metal, and Gothic sensibility; while it doesn't stand head and shoulders above the Morgana Lefay back catalog, it's still up to that level, and fans will be satisfied".

Sweden's Göteborgs-Posten opined that despite the name change, Lefay still played "pompous technical metal", the kind that "doesn't last throughout the playtime in eight out of ten cases". The grading was 2 out of 5. Norway's Jærbladet stated that the album was "power, without sounding of the 80s" and compared the band to Savatage. The Seventh Seal sounded better with each listen. Lollipop Magazine drew the same comparison to Savatage and singer Jon Oliva, but more importantly, Lefay was "a less ragged type of Nevermore", and with this "further step", the band was ready to "rightfully assume the throne alongside Nevermore as state-of-the-art new power metallers anchored to bottom-end quakewaves".

== Songs ==
All music and lyrics written by Lefay

1. "End of Living" - 5:51
2. "The Seventh Seal" - 5:20
3. "I Am" - 5:03
4. "The Boon He Gives" - 5:03
5. "Moonlit Night" - 6:00
6. "Child of Time" - 4:33
7. "Hårga" - 6:48
8. "So Strange" - 5:38
9. "As Far as I Can Go" - 5:33
10. "Shadow Empire" - 3:59

== Personnel ==
- Charles Rytkönen - Vocals
- Tony Eriksson - Guitars
- Peter Grehn - Guitars
- Micke Åsentorp - Bass
- Robin Engström - Drums
