= Requiem (Bathory album) =

Studio album by Bathory
- Released: 17 October 1994
- Recorded: June 1994 at Montezuma Studio, Stockholm, Sweden
- Genre: Thrash metal
- Length: 33:21
- Label: Black Mark
- Producer: Börje Forsberg, Quorthon

Bathory chronology
Twilight of the Gods (1991)	Requiem (1994)	Octagon (1995)

Professional ratings
Review scores
Source	Rating
AllMusic	3/5 stars
Collector's Guide to Heavy Metal	7/10

Requiem is the seventh studio album by Swedish extreme metal band Bathory. It eschews the Viking metal style of Bathory's three previous releases for a thrash metal style that recalls many of the bands that initially influenced Bathory. This album marks the return of Bathory after Quorthon put the band on hold to record his first solo album.

== Track listing ==
All tracks are written by Quorthon.

No.	Title	Length
1.	"Requiem"	5:00
2.	"Crosstitution"	3:16
3.	"Necroticus"	3:19
4.	"War Machine"	3:18
5.	"Blood and Soil"	3:34
6.	"Pax Vobiscum"	4:13
7.	"Suffocate"	3:36
8.	"Distinguish to Kill"	3:16
9.	"Apocalypse"	3:49
Total length:		33:21

== Personnel ==
- Quorthon – guitar, vocals
- Kothaar – bass guitar
- Vvornth – percussion, drums
