= S.O.S (Morgana Lefay album) =

- Cover art by Kristian Wåhlin

Studio album by Lefay
- Released: 21 March 2000
- Recorded: Studio Soundcreation, Bollnäs, Sweden
- Genres: Heavy metal, power metal, thrash metal
- Length: 52:24
- Label: Noise
- Producers: Lefay & Per Ryberg

Lefay chronology
Symphony of the Damned, Re-symphonised (1999)	S.O.S (2000)	Grand Materia (2005)

Professional ratings
Review scores
Source	Rating
Rock Hard	9.5/10

S.O.S is the eighth album by Swedish heavy metal band Morgana Lefay (under the name Lefay). It was released on 21 March 2000.

== Reception ==
In 2005, the album was ranked number 417 in Rock Hard magazine's book The 500 Greatest Rock & Metal Albums of All Time.

== Track listing ==
1. "Save Our Souls" – 4:36
2. "Cimmerian Dream" – 4:57
3. "Sleepwalker" – 4:52
4. "Epicedium" – 6:01
5. "When Gargoyles Fly" – 4:32
6. "What Dreams Forbode" – 5:05
7. "Bloodred Sky" – 6:04
8. "Help Me Out of Here" – 4:55
9. "The Quest for Reality" – 3:44
10. "The Choice" – 7:47

== Personnel ==
- Charles Rytkönen – vocals
- Tony Eriksson – guitars
- Peter Grehn – guitars
- Micke Åsentorp – bass
- Robin Engström – drums
