= Morgana Lefay =

Swedish heavy metal band

- Also known as: Damage (1986–1989); Lefay (1999–2001)
- Origin: Bollnäs, Sweden
- Genres: Heavy metal; power metal; thrash metal; groove metal; progressive metal
- Years active: 1989–1997; 1999–2001; 2004–2007; 2012–present
- Labels: Black Mark; Noise
- Website: morganalefay.se

Morgana Lefay (known as Damage from 1986 to 1989 and Lefay from 1999 to 2001) is a Swedish power/thrash metal band from Bollnäs. They are named after Morgan Le Fay of the Arthurian cycle.

== History ==
Morgana Lefay independently released their first album, Symphony of the Damned, in 1990. The success of the album allowed the band to tour and eventually landed them with Black Mark Records.

In 1997, Morgana Lefay disbanded. Persson, Heder and Söderlind kept the name. Meantime, Rytkönen and Eriksson were joined by drummer Robin Engström (formerly of M.I.D., Dark Tranquillity and Fantasmagoria) and continued under the name Lefay, changing their record label to Noise Records. After releasing three albums, they got back the name Morgana Lefay when they returned to Black Mark Records. The albums The Seventh Seal, Symphony of the Damned Re-symphonised, and S.O.S were made when the band was called Lefay. In 1999, a self-titled album was made with Thomas Persson on guitar.

In May 2006, drummer Robin Engström left the band because of personal differences. Later that month, Pelle Åkerlind became the new permanent drummer. In late August 2006, the band went into Studio Soundcreation to record a new album, titled Aberrations of the Mind. It was released in March 2007 and was the first album with Åkerlind on drums.

== Members ==
=== Current ===
- Charles Rytkönen – vocals (1989–present)
- Tony Eriksson – guitars (1989–present)
- Peter Grehn – guitars, backing vocals (1998–present)
- Fredrik Lundberg – bass, backing vocals (2003–present)
- Pelle Åkerlind – drums, backing vocals (2006–present)

=== Former ===
- Stefan Jonsson – guitars (1986–1989)
- Tommi Karppanen – guitars (1989–1994)
- Daniel Persson – guitars (1994–1997)
- Joakim Lundberg – bass (1986–1991)
- Joakim Heder – bass (1991–1997)
- Micke Åsentorp – bass [The "Lefay" years] (1997–2003)
- Jonas Söderlind – drums (1986–1997)
- Robin Engström – drums (1998–2006)

== Discography ==
=== Studio albums ===
Title	Released	Label
Symphony of the Damned	1990	Self-released
Knowing Just as I	1993	Black Mark Records
The Secret Doctrine	1993	Black Mark Records
Sanctified	1995	Black Mark Records
Maleficium	1996	Black Mark Records
Morgana Lefay	1999	Black Mark Records
The Seventh Seal	1999	Noise Records
Symphony of the Damned, Re-symphonised	1999	Noise Records
S.O.S.	2000	Noise Records
Grand Materia	2005	Black Mark Records
Aberrations of the Mind	2007	Black Mark Records

=== Singles and demos ===
Title	Released	Label
"Rumors of Rain" (demo)	1992	Self-released
"Over and Over Again"	2007	Black Mark Records

=== Compilations ===
Title	Released	Label
Past, Present, Future	1995	Black Mark Records
Fata Morgana	1998	Black Mark Records

== See also ==
- Morgan le Fay in modern culture
