= Bathory (album) =

Studio album by Bathory
- Released: 2 October 1984
- Recorded: June 1984
- Studio: Heavenshore Studio (Stockholm)
- Genres: Black metal; thrash metal
- Length: 26:58
- Label: Black Mark/Tyfon (Note: Black Mark Production did not exist as a company; it was created to diffentiate Bathory.)
- Producers: Quorthon; The Boss

Bathory chronology
Bathory (1984)	The Return...... (1985)

Alternate cover
- Cover of all subsequent releases of Bathory following the original pressing.

Bathory is the debut studio album by Swedish extreme metal band Bathory. It was released on 2 October 1984, through Tyfon Grammofon. It is considered by fans and critics to be a contender for one of the first black metal records.

== Background and recording ==
Bathory was formed in 1983. The band's frontman, Quorthon, worked part-time at the small record label Tyfon. In late 1983 and early 1984, the label was putting together a compilation of songs by Scandinavian metal bands. However, at the last minute, one of the bands backed out. Tyfon agreed to let Bathory appear on the record as a replacement, and the band recorded two songs for the compilation—"Sacrifice" and "The Return of the Darkness and Evil"—in January. The album, Scandinavian Metal Attack, was released in March 1984 and was Bathory's first appearance on record. To everyone's surprise, over 95 percent of fan mail sent to the label after the record's release was dedicated to Bathory. Tyfon asked the band to record a full-length album. His bandmates having moved away, Quorthon recruited Rickard Bergman as bassist and Stefan Larsson as drummer. On 22 May 1984, they had their first and only rehearsal together before recording the album. Here they recorded the songs "Satan My Master" and "Witchcraft", which would later appear on the compilation album Jubileum Volume III.

On 14 June the band entered Heavenshore Studio in Stockholm—a converted garage—to record the debut. The studio had a homemade eight-channel tape recorder. Due to the band's tight budget, they ran the recorder at half-speed to fit everything on one master tape. They also had to work quickly – the recording and mixing were done in somewhere between 32 and 56 hours.

The song "Reaper" was a re-recorded version of "Witchcraft."

== Release ==
Bathory was released in October 1984 and sold out its subsequent pressing of 1000 in two weeks. The album has since gained a cult notoriety. Bathory was reissued in 1990 through Black Mark Production.

== Music and lyrics ==
According to the staff of Revolver, Bathory "took the lo-fi shittiness of Venom and added icy Norse paganism to the garbled mix." Rob Ferrier of AllMusic described the music on the album as "eerie" and "inaccessible." Additionally, he called the lyrics "uncomfortable." Daniel Ekeroth, author of the book Swedish Death Metal, described the album's style as "basically a mix of the Satanic party rock of Venom and the energy of San Francisco thrash metal". While Bathory leader Quorthon claimed to have not heard Venom before making the album and to be inspired by Black Sabbath, Motörhead, Sex Pistols, and GBH, former drummer Jonas Åkerlund claimed that Bathory was "exclusively" inspired by Venom during these days.

== Artwork and packaging ==
The album was originally to be named Pentagrammaton and to have a pentagram on the cover, but this name was scrapped when several people misread it as Pentagon. The pentagram was moved to the back and replaced with a re-touched portion of a drawing made by Joseph A. Smith in 1981 for the book Witches by Erica Jong. For the writing on the back cover, Quorthon bought a set of rub-on letters in the Old English font; however, he was one letter short ('C'), and as a result, the second 'C' in "Necromancy" was replaced with an 'S'. The introduction, "Storm of Damnation", and the outro was also mistakenly left off the track listing.

The goat that appears on the cover, taken from a drawing by Joseph Smith, was originally meant to be printed in gold. However, this was too expensive to use, so Quorthon asked for it to be as near to gold as possible; the result was a bright yellow color. According to Swedish Death Metal, Quorthon thought it looked "awful", and after the first 1000 pressings it was switched to black-and-white. The yellow cover has become a collector's item, and is now well known as "Gula Geten" ("The Yellow Goat").

The album's sleeve erroneously states that the album was recorded at Elektra Studios instead of Heavenshore Studio. Additionally, the track "Storm Of Damnation" was not listed on the track listing for the album's original pressing due to an error on the band's part.

== Reception and legacy ==
Professional ratings
Review scores
Source	Rating
AllMusic	3/5 stars
Collector's Guide to Heavy Metal	4/10

Bathory is considered by some to be the first black metal album.

AllMusic critic Rob Ferrier wrote: "The music itself has a certain lo-fi charm, and if you're into this sort of thing the raw power of this debut cannot be ignored." Also writing for AllMusic, Eduardo Rivadavia has stated that the record and its follow-up The Return...... were "so inaccessible, so unprecedented in their abrasive anti-commercialism, as to be ahead of their time, carving a niche all their own within this quickly developing subgenre." Canadian journalist Martin Popoff called the album "a cruel joke but a historically poignant one" and remarked how, despite striving "to be the leading edge of repellent extreme", Quorthon's debut is very musical "versus the black-hearted Norwegian acts" that would cite him as a main influence.

In 2013, Decibel ranked Bathory at number 11 on its list of the Top 100 Black Metal Albums of All Time.

== Track listing ==
All tracks are written by Quorthon.

Side 'Darkness'
No.	Title	Length
1.	"Storm of Damnation (Intro)"	3:06
2.	"Hades"	2:45
3.	"Reaper"	2:44
4.	"Necromansy (Note: The track title is misspelled, as Quorthon ran out of the letter "c" while using Letraset to create the track list on the back cover.)"	3:40
5.	"Sacrifice"	3:16

Side 'Evil'
No.	Title	Length
6.	"In Conspirasy with Satan"	2:29
7.	"Armageddon"	2:31
8.	"Raise the Dead"	3:41
9.	"War"	2:15
10.	"Outro"	0:22
Total length:		26:52

== Personnel ==
Bathory

- Quorthon (Thomas Börje Forsberg) – vocals, guitar, production
- Stefan Larsson – drums
- Rickard Bergman – bass guitar

Production

- The Boss (Börje Forsberg) – engineering, production

== Sources ==
- Ekeroth, Daniel (29 July 2008). "Swedish Metal Gets Brutalized". Swedish Death Metal. Bazillion Points Books. p. 31. ISBN 978-0979616310.
