= C. Dean Andersson =

American writer

Cloyce Dean Andersson
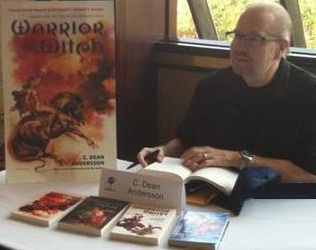
- C. Dean Andersson signs books at FenCon in Dallas, Texas, September 2012 (photographed by Christopher Fulbright)
- Born: Cloyce Dean Andersson; March 20, 1946; Little River, Kansas, U.S.
- Died: July 5, 2021 (aged 75); Dallas, Texas, U.S.
- Occupations: Writer, artist, musician
- Spouse: Nina Romberg
- Writing career
- Pen name: Asa Drake; C. Dean Andersson
- Language: English language
- Period: 1981–2021
- Genres: Fantasy, Science Fiction, Horror
- Website: www.cdeanandersson.com

C. Dean Andersson (March 20, 1946 - July 5, 2021) was an American writer of fantasy fiction and horror novels since 1981, both under his own name and under the pseudonym Asa Drake. He was best known as a writer of fiction in the science fiction, fantasy, and horror genres.

== Biography ==
Andsersson was born on March 20, 1946, in Kansas. His upbringing in Kansas inspired the setting for his novel Buried Screams and for several scenes in Raw Pain Max.

A childhood encounter with Dracula in a small Kansas movie theater led to a fascination with the character and with vampires more broadly, which inspired two novels, Crimson Kisses and I Am Dracula. Having a Swedish-American father led to an interest in Scandinavian mythology and Viking Age history, used for the Bloodsong Saga Warrior series, including Witch of Hel, Death Riders of Hel, Werebeasts of Hel, and Valkyries of Hel.

Andsersson also worked as a television graphic artist, professional musician in United States Air Force bands, robotics computer programmer, and a technical writer specializing in software documentation for mainframe relational database management systems.

His familiarity with Dallas, Texas provided background for the Dallas Horror Trilogy, Torture Tomb, Raw Pain Max, and Fiend. A childhood fear of Witches caused by Disney's Snow White and the Seven Dwarfs drew him to researching historical witchcraft persecutions, modern Neo Pagan religions, and Goddess Spirituality which influenced thematic elements in many of his novels.

Andersson was a veteran of the U.S. Air Force. He held a Bachelor of Science in astrophysics and a Bachelor of Arts in art. He was a member of the Science Fiction and Fantasy Writers of America and was a Bram Stoker Award nominee.

=== Prizes, honors, awards, tributes ===
Andersson was elected to Sigma Pi Sigma (Physics Honor Society), Beta Gamma Sigma (Business Honor Society), Phi Kappa Phi (National Honor Society). He was the Horror Writers Association (HWA) Bram Stoker Award 2007 Short Fiction Finalist for "The Death Wagon Rolls on By," which featured a very close encounter with Hel, Norse Goddess of the Underworld.

The Swedish Black Metal band Bathory dedicated the song "One Rode to Asa Bay" to Andersson, as a tribute to his Scandinavian mythos Bloodsong Saga, originally written under the pen name of Asa Drake.

=== Illness and death ===
Andersson died in his sleep July 5, 2021 at home in Richardson, Texas after a long illness. He was 75.

== Bibliography ==
=== Hel Trilogy aka Bloodsong Saga ===
As C. Dean Andersson: (definitive edition of whole trilogy, revised and expanded)

- Bloodsong! HEL X 3 (2013) includes Warrior Witch of Hel, Death Riders of Hel, Werebeasts of Hel

As C. Dean Andersson: (reprints of original trilogy)

1. Warrior Witch (2000), Russian language edition (2002)
2. Warrior Rebel (2000), Russian language edition (2002)
3. Warrior Beast (2000), Russian language edition (2002)

As Asa Drake: (original trilogy)

1. Warrior Witch of Hel (1985)
2. Death Riders of Hel (1986)
3. Werebeasts of Hel (1986)

=== Single novels ===
As C. Dean Andersson:

- Torture Tomb (1987)
- Raw Pain Max (1988)
- Buried Screams (1992)
- I Am Dracula (1993)
- Fiend (1994)
- I am Frankenstein (1996)

Note: 2 novels set in the Mortal Kombat universe were written but never released by the publisher (1996)

As Asa Drake:

- Crimson Kisses (1981)
- The Lair of Ancient Dreams (1982)

=== Short stories ===
As C. Dean Andersson

- "Night Watch" in SCARE CARE (1989)
- "Horror Heaven" in DARK SEDUCTIONS (1993)
- "Small Brown Bags of Blood" in DARK DESTINY (1995)
- "My Greatest Fear" in SONS OF DARKNESS (1996)
- "Troll Story" in THE SPLENDOUR FALLS (1996)
- "The Blood of Othinn" in DARK DESTINY III: CHILDREN OF DRACULA (1996)
- "The War Skull of Hel" in PAWN OF CHAOS: TALES OF THE ETERNAL CHAMPION (1996)
- "Barbed Wire Machete" in PERSONAL DEMONS
- "Dust Bowl" in THE BOOK OF ALL FLESH (2001)
- "Hang Tuff," "Daddy's Dinner," and "Odin's Swallow" in SMALL BITES (2004)
- "The Tomb of Fog and Flowers" in THE MANY FACES OF VAN HELSING (2004)
- "Slim and Swede and the Damned Dead Horse" in CROSS PLAINS UNIVERSE (2006)
- "The Death Wagon Rolls On By" in CEMETERY DANCE #57 (2007)
- "Mama Strangelove's Remedies for Afterlife Disorders or, How I Learned to Stop Worrying and Love Mother Death" in THE BRUTARIAN #52 (2008)
- "The Testament of Tuff" in WHAT SCARES THE BOOGEY MAN? horror anthology edited by John Manning (Perseid Publishing, 2013)
