= Sanctified (album) =

Studio album by Morgana Lefay
- Released: 17 October 1995
- Recorded: Wavestation L.A., Sweden
- Genre: Heavy metal, power metal, thrash metal, groove metal
- Length: 57:40
- Label: Black Mark Records
- Producer: Morgana Lefay and Ulf Peterson

Morgana Lefay chronology
Past, Present, Future (1995)	Sanctified (1995)	Maleficium (1996)

Sanctified is the fourth studio album by Swedish heavy metal band Morgana Lefay, released in 1995.

== Reception ==
The album received a review of 9/10 from Rockhard.de. In the Swedish mainstream press, the album got short reviews in Dagens Nyheter, Svenska Dagbladet, Aftonbladet and Helsingborgs Dagblad. Critics thought the album lacked innovation, but Aftonbladet noted that "If every song were as good as 'To Isengard', I could not shut off the record". Expressen compared Morgana Lefay to "a bleak Pantera". I Norway, Scream called the record "well above average" in the current time, but two or three songs were not up to par and the album received a 4 out of 6 score.

== Track listing ==
All music and lyrics written and arranged by Morgana Lefay.

1. Out in the Silence – 4:05
2. Time Is God – 5:09
3. To Isengard – 5:17
4. Why? - 5:03
5. Mad Messiah – 5:04
6. Another Dawn – 4:43
7. In the Court of the Crimson King – 3:51
8. Sorrow Calls – 8:21
9. Where Insanity Rules – 4:15
10. Shadows of God – 4:13
11. Gil-Galad (The Sanctified) – 7:34

(4:06 minutes into "Gil-Galad (The Sanctified)" there's a "hidden" bonus track)

== Credits ==
- Charles Rytkönen – vocals
- Tony Eriksson – guitars
- Daniel Persson – guitars
- Joakim Heder – bass
- Jonas Söderlind – drums
