= Octagon (Bathory album) =

Studio album by Bathory
- Released: 5 June 1995
- Recorded: 30 January – 23 March 1995
- Studio: Hellhole Studios (Stockholm, Sweden)
- Genre: Thrash metal
- Length: 39:40
- Label: Black Mark
- Producer: Borje Forsberg, Quorthon

Bathory chronology
Requiem (1994)	Octagon (1995)	Blood on Ice (1996)

Octagon is the eighth studio album by Swedish extreme metal band Bathory. It was released on 5 June 1995 through Black Mark Production. It continues the retro thrash metal style of the previous album, Requiem. It was reissued in 2003, with the first two tracks combined and "Winds of Mayhem" outro added.

== Background ==
Two songs that were intended for the album, Resolution Greed, and Genocide, were not released on it and were included on the Jubileum, Vol. 3 compilation, which was released in 1998. The two tracks were removed at the request of the label. A cover of the Kiss song Deuce was "hastily recorded" weeks before the albums release, to fill the gap. Quorthon called the track "truly disastrous" in retrospect.

== Track listing ==
All tracks are written by Quorthon, except "Deuce", written by Gene Simmons.

No.	Title	Length
1.	"Immaculate Pinetreeroad #930"	2:46
2.	"Born to Die"	3:58
3.	"Psychopath"	3:19
4.	"Sociopath"	3:09
5.	"Grey"	1:14
6.	"Century"	4:08
7.	"33 Something"	3:16
8.	"War Supply"	4:41
9.	"Schizianity"	4:17
10.	"Judgement of Posterity"	5:11
11.	"Deuce" (Kiss cover)	3:42
Total length:		39:40

=== 2003 reissue ===
All tracks are written by Quorthon, except "Deuce", written by Gene Simmons.

No.	Title	Length
1.	"Immaculate Pinetreeroad #930 / Born to Die"	6:45
2.	"Psychopath"	3:19
3.	"Sociopath"	3:09
4.	"Grey"	1:14
5.	"Century"	4:08
6.	"33 Something"	3:16
7.	"War Supply"	4:41
8.	"Schizianity"	4:17
9.	"Judgement of Posterity"	5:11
10.	"Deuce" (Kiss cover)	3:42
11.	"Winds of Mayhem (Outro)"	0:23
Total length:		40:03

== Critical reception ==
Professional ratings
Review scores
Source	Rating
AllMusic	2/5 stars
Chronicles of Chaos	8/10
Collector's Guide to Heavy Metal	8/10

Spin Magazine said it was one of the worst heavy metal albums of all time.

== Personnel ==
- Quorthon – vocals, guitar
- Kothaar – bass guitar
- Vvornth – percussion, drums
