= Bruzaholm =

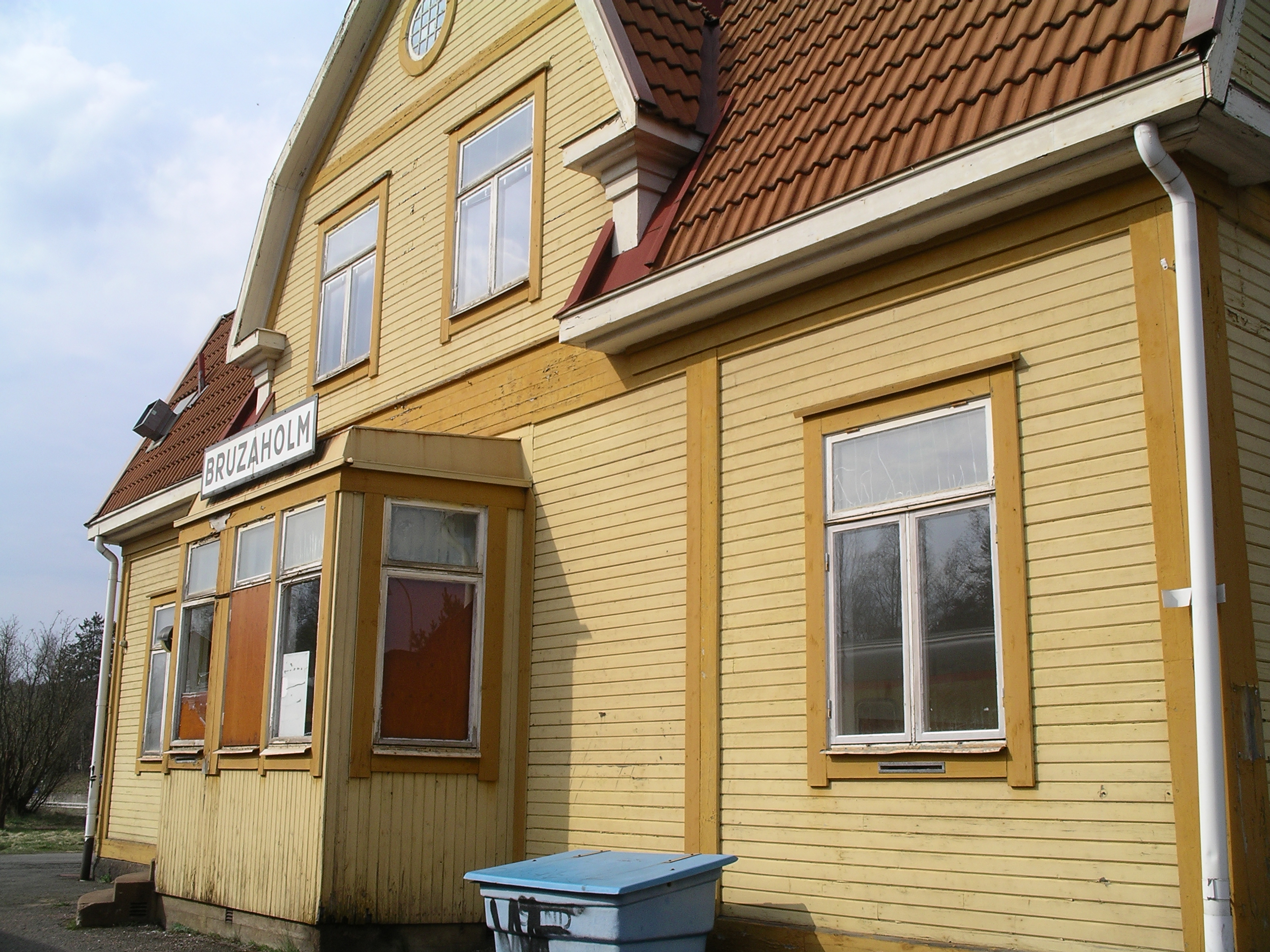

- Location within Jönköping Location within Sweden
- Coordinates: 57°38′N 15°16′E
- Country: Sweden
- Province: Småland
- County: Jönköping County
- Municipality: Eksjö Municipality

Area
  - Total: 0.64 km^{2} (0.25 sq mi)

Population (31 December 2010)
  - Total: 250
  - Density: 392/km^{2} (1,020/sq mi)
- Time zone: UTC+1 (CET)
  - Summer (DST): UTC+2 (CEST)
- Climate: Cfb

Bruzaholm is a locality situated in Eksjö Municipality, Jönköping County, Sweden with 250 inhabitants in 2010. It is one of only two inhabited localities in Sweden whose name contain the letter z; the name comes from "Brusan", a name for a nearby river, and the suffix "-holm". It has been spelled in several ways from the 18th century to the early 20th, including "Brysaholm" and "Brusaholm". The current spelling was recommended by Harry Ståhl in 1948.
