= Twilight of the Gods (album) =

Studio album by Bathory
- Released: 29 June 1991
- Recorded: April 1991 at Montezuma Studio, Stockholm, Sweden
- Genre: Viking metal; doom metal
- Length: 56:50
- Label: Black Mark
- Producer: Borje Forsberg, Quorthon

Bathory chronology
Hammerheart (1990)	Twilight of the Gods (1991)	Requiem (1994)

Professional ratings
Review scores
Source	Rating
AllMusic	3/5 stars
Collector's Guide to Heavy Metal	7/10

Twilight of the Gods is the sixth studio album by Swedish extreme metal band Bathory. It continues the exploration of the newly created Viking metal style, and also displays heavy epic doom, progressive and classical influences.

The song "Hammerheart" is based on Gustav Holst's Jupiter from his 1918 The Planets suite. The back cover features a 3x3 metre structure designed by Quorthon himself to represent Yggdrasil, the world tree.

== Recording ==
Atypically, Quorthon practiced the leads for about a month, noting in a 1996 interview that he would typically improvise and would either use the first or second take, but that on the album, "you can hear that the leads are arranged" and they sounded better.

Quorthon noted in a 2003 interview that the song "Bond of Blood" was "recycled" from a song that was recorded during the Valhalla sessions. The original track, "In Nomine Satanas", was included on the Jubileum Volume III compilation.

== Track listing ==
All tracks are written by Quorthon, except "Hammerheart", music by Gustav Holst (excerpt of Jupiter, The Bringer of Jollity) with lyrics by Quorthon.

No.	Title	Length
1.	"Prologue/Twilight of the Gods/Epilogue"	14:02
2.	"Through Blood by Thunder"	6:16
3.	"Blood and Iron"	10:25
4.	"Under the Runes"	5:59
5.	"To Enter Your Mountain"	7:38
6.	"Bond of Blood"	7:35
7.	"Hammerheart"	4:57
Total length:		56:50

The 2003 remastered edition combines tracks 1–3 as one track.

== Personnel ==
- Quorthon – vocals, guitar, bass guitar, keyboards, drums, production, engineering, mixing
- Boss Forsberg – production, engineering, mixing
