= Quorthon =

Swedish musician (1966–2004)

- Quorthon in 1990 during the Hammerheart promo tour

Background information
- Also known as: Ace Shoot; Black Spade
- Born: Thomas Börje Forsberg; 17 February 1966; Stockholm, Sweden
- Died: 3 June 2004 (aged 38) Stockholm, Sweden
- Genres: Black metal; Viking metal; thrash metal; alternative rock; Oi!
- Occupations: Musician; singer; songwriter; multi-instrumentalist
- Instruments: Vocals; guitar; bass; drum machine; percussion
- Years active: c. 1980 – 2004
- Formerly of: Bathory

Thomas Börje Forsberg (17 February 1966 – 3 June 2004), better known by the stage name Quorthon, was a Swedish musician. He was one of the founders, as well as the sole songwriter, of the band Bathory, which pioneered the black metal genre and is credited with creating the Viking metal style. A multi-instrumentalist, Quorthon wrote the music and lyrics on all of Bathory's albums and performed vocals and guitars.

== Career ==
Quorthon briefly played in the Oi! band Stridskuk, which also featured drummer Johan "Jolle" Elvén and bass player Rickard "Ribban" Bergman.

Quorthon formed Bathory in 1983 when he was 17 years old; Elvén and Bergman would later play on early Bathory demos and, in Bergman's case, albums. Early Bathory member Jonas Åkerlund has stated that he and his cousin Frederick Melander were the original members of Bathory; Ace, as Quorthon was known at the time, was recruited into the band when they were looking for a new vocalist/guitarist. He recorded his early albums together with the help of his father Stig Börje "Boss" Forsberg (1944-2017) who was also the head of the Swedish record label Tyfon Grammofon that would go on to release most of Bathory's albums through the subsidiary Black Mark Production. The first album, Bathory, was recorded in the garage of schlager writer Peter Himmelstrand, dubbed Studio Heavenshore.

During the mid-1980s, live performances by Bathory were rare; in 1985, Bathory quit doing live appearances entirely. Albums from this period contributed to the then-burgeoning black metal subgenre, and rare photographs of the band helped in part to define its image. Beginning in the 1990s, Quorthon took full control of Bathory, still choosing to avoid performing live in order to spend more time recording music with hired musicians; he also changed style from the black metal of the 1980s to a slower, heavier style which eventually became the founding of the Viking metal genre, due to its lyrics being focused on Norse mythology.

Quorthon also personally paid for the production of Bathory's only music video, for the song "One Rode to Asa Bay", taken from their fifth studio album, Hammerheart. The video was shown on MTV, though Quorthon had not seen it.

In January 1994, Quorthon set Bathory aside and recorded a solo album, called Album, which was released that September. He recorded Purity of Essence in August 1996. His solo albums were released to "write and record something that was as far away from Bathory as possible". The albums released under the Quorthon moniker drew more influence from alternative rock than Bathory's black/Viking metal style, with Quorthon noting that it sounded similar to Oasis. While working on these albums he found new inspiration to continue composing music for Bathory, writing the album Requiem in two weeks.

Bathory's following album, Octagon, was also in a retro-thrash metal style, before he shifted towards his Viking metal style once again, especially on the Nordland saga.

== Death and tributes ==
On 3 June 2004, Quorthon was found dead in his apartment in Stockholm. The cause of his death was a congenital heart defect. He was 38 years old.

The month following his death, several members of the Norwegian black metal scene gathered to perform Bathory songs in a set titled A Tribute to Quorthon at the Hole in the Sky festival in Bergen, Norway. The lineup included Abbath (Immortal), Apollyon (Aura Noir), Faust and Samoth (Emperor and Zyklon), Gaahl (Gorgoroth), Grutle Kjellson and Ivar Bjørnson (Enslaved), Nocturno Culto (Darkthrone) and Satyr (Satyricon).

The black metal supergroup I featuring Abbath, Ice Dale of Enslaved, King ov Hell of Gorgoroth and former Immortal drummer Armagedda dedicated the song "Far Beyond the Quiet" from their 2006 album Between Two Worlds to Quorthon.

Blood Fire Death – A Tribute to Quorthon and the music of Bathory is a music project dedicated to honouring the music of Quorthon and Bathory. The project started in 2024 for the 20th anniversary of Quorthon's death. The project has been appearing live since the start, having played at a variety of festivals, the largest being Beyond the Gates and Brutal Assault. They are also set to play at Tons of Rock in 2026.

== Legacy ==
In 2015, Alex Distefano of OC Weekly referred to him as "one of the most mysterious figures in extreme metal." In 2023, Andy O'Connor of Spin wrote: "Though other acts have gone on to more visible success, no one still looms quite as large in Swedish metal as Quorthon, the man behind Bathory. He was not only partially responsible for inventing black metal, he reinvented it a few times prior to black metal’s explosion in the early to mid-’90s."

== Discography ==
=== As Bathory ===
- Bathory (1984)
- The Return...... (1985)
- Under the Sign of the Black Mark (1987)
- Blood Fire Death (1988)
- Hammerheart (1990)
- Twilight of the Gods (1991)
- Jubileum Volume I (1992)
- Jubileum Volume II (1993)
- Requiem (1994)
- Octagon (1995)
- Blood on Ice (1996)
- Jubileum Volume III (1998)
- Destroyer of Worlds (2001)
- Nordland I (2002)
- Nordland II (2003)

=== As Quorthon ===
- Album (1994)
- When Our Day Is Through EP (1997)
- Purity of Essence (1997)
