= Under One Flag =

British record label

- Parent company: Music for Nations (which was parented by Zomba Music Group)
- Founded: 1986
- Defunct: 1994
- Distributor: Zomba Music Group
- Genre: Heavy metal, speed metal, thrash metal, death metal
- Country of origin: United Kingdom
- Location: London

Under One Flag was a British record label from London, which catered to a heavy metal audience, particularly thrash metal. They were best known for re-releasing classic heavy metal albums, from the likes of Venom and Dark Angel, as well as some original releases from both bands and other heavy metal bands. Releases on vinyl by Under One Flag are sometimes still much desired collector's items.

== History ==
Under One Flag operated as a subsidiary label for Music for Nations, which later took over all Under One Flag's releases and most of the bands they signed. Music For Nations in turn is a subsidiary label of Zomba Music Group. The first official release Under One Flag published was "The Force", from English band Onslaught, in 1986. In this era the CD was making a shift entry in the music world. However, Under One Flag also kept on publishing heavy metal releases on vinyl and even cassette, besides on CD. They also published a number of compilation albums, under the name of "Speed Kills…", followed by any term that would relate to a then popular metal song.

In the meanwhile, they also released the third and fourth album of Swedish black metal band Bathory, which secured their status more and more. This enabled them to sign bands from the likes of Nuclear Assault and Forbidden. Under One Flag bought the rights to a number of previously released thrash metal albums, among which a significant part of the catalogue of Combat Records. They also re-released the compilation of Death’s Fate: The Best of Death.

In the early 1990s, the popularity of heavy metal rose to a new level. Cult bands reached bigger audiences in the mainstream and parent label Music For Nations took over all activities and pulled the plug on Under One Flag. The last album published by Under One Flag was ‘’Progress of Decadence’’ from Overdose, in 1994. A total number of 232 releases were published by Under One Flag with a span of thirty one titles.

== Catalogue ==
Artist	Title (Format)	Year	Serial number
Acid Drinkers	Strip Tease (CD, Album)	1992	CDFLAG 76
Acid Drinkers	Dirty Money Dirty Tricks (LP, Album)	1991	FLAG 59
Acid Drinkers	Dirty Money, Dirty Tricks (CD, Album)	1991	CD FLAG 59
Acid Drinkers	Are You A Rebel? (LP, Album)	1990	FLAG 45
Acid Drinkers	Are You A Rebel? (CD, Album)	1990	CD FLAG 45
Acid Reign	The Worst of Acid Reign (LP, Comp + 7")	1991	FLAG 60
Acid Reign	The Worst of Acid Reign (CD)	1991	CD FLAG 60
Acid Reign	Obnoxious (Album) (3 versions)	1990	FLAG 39
Acid Reign	Obnoxious (LP, Album)	1990	FLAG 39
Acid Reign	Obnoxious (LP, TP)	1990	FLAG 39
Acid Reign	Obnoxious (Cass)	1990	FLAG 39
Acid Reign	Obnoxious (CD, Album)	1990	CD FLAG 39
Acid Reign	Hangin' On The Telephone (Cass, EP)	1989	T FLAG 109
Acid Reign	The Fear (Cass)	1989	TFLAG 31
Acid Reign	Hangin' On The Telephone (7", Single)	1989	FLAG 109
Acid Reign	The Fear (Album) (2 versions)	1989	FLAG 31
Acid Reign	The Fear (LP, Album)	1989	FLAG 31
Acid Reign	The Fear / Moshkinstein (CD, Album)	1989	CD FLAG 31
Acid Reign	Hangin' On The Telephone (12", EP)	1989	12 FLAG 109
Acid Reign	Humanoia (EP) (2 versions)	1989	10 FLAG 106
Acid Reign	Humanoia (10", EP)	1989	10 FLAG 106
Acid Reign	Humanoia (10", EP)	1989	10 FLAG 106
Acid Reign	Moshkinstein (12", MiniAlbum)	1988	M FLAG 20
Acid Reign	Moshkinstein (12", EP)	1988	88561-8230-1
Agony	The First Defiance (LP, Album)	1988	FLAG 19
Agony	The First Defiance (CD, Album)	1988	CD FLAG 19
Agony	The First Defiance (LP, Album)	1988	88561-8229-1
Agony	The First Defiance (LP, Album)	1988	100871
Apocalypse	Apocalypse (Cass, Album)	1988	T FLAG 23
Apocalypse	Apocalypse (LP, Album)	1988	FLAG 23
Apocalypse	Apocalypse (CD, Album)	1988	CD FLAG 23
Bad Moon Rising	Blood (CD, Album)	1993	CDFLAG 79
Bad Moon Rising	Bad Moon Rising (CD, Album)	1993	CDFLAG 78
Bathory	The Return...... (LP, Album)		FLAG 9
Bathory	Bathory (LP, Album)		FLAG 8
Bathory	Blood Fire Death (CD, Album)	1990	MCD 1063
Bathory	Blood Fire Death (Cass, Album)	1988	T FLAG 26
Bathory	Blood Fire Death (LP, Album, Pic)	1988	FLAG 26P
Bathory	Blood Fire Death (LP, Album, Gat)	1988	FLAG 26
Bathory	Blood Fire Death (CD, Album)	1988	CDFLAG 26
Bathory	Blood Fire Death (LP, Album)	1988	102261
Bathory	Under The Sign of the Black Mark (Cass, Album)	1987	T FLAG 11
Bathory	Under The Sign of the Black Mark (LP, Album)	1987	FLAG 11
Bathory	Under The Sign of the Black Mark (LP, Album)	1987	2370
Blind Illusion	The Sane Asylum (LP, Album)	1988	FLAG 18
Blind Illusion	The Sane Asylum (CD, Album)	1988	CD FLAG 18
Blind Illusion	The Sane Asylum (LP, Album)	1988	88561-8226-1
Blind Illusion	The Sane Asylum (LP)	1988	100812
Blind Illusion	The Sane Asylum (CD, Album)	1988	25DP 5346
C.I.A.	In The Red (CD, Album)		CD FLAG 40
C.I.A.	Attitude (LP)	1992	FLAG 68
C.I.A.	Attitude (CD, Album)	1992	CDFLAG 68
C.I.A.	In The Red (LP, Album)	1990	FLAG 40
Cerebral Fix	Death Erotica (Cass, Album)	1992	TFLAG75
Cerebral Fix	Death Erotica (LP)	1992	FLAG75
Cerebral Fix	Death Erotica (CD, Album)	1992	CD FLAG 75
Creation of Death	Purify Your Soul (LP, Album)	1991	Flag 62
Creation of Death	Purify Your Soul (CD)	1991	CDFLAG 62
Dark Angel	Decade of Chaos – The Best Of (Cass, Comp)	1992	TMFLAG 70
Dark Angel	Decade of Chaos – The Best Of (LP, Comp)	1992	MFLAG 70
Dark Angel	Decade of Chaos – The Best Of (CD, Comp, RM)	1992	CDMFLAG 70
Dark Angel	Time Does Not Heal (2xLP, Album, Gat)	1991	FLAG 54DM
Dark Angel	Time Does Not Heal (CD, Album)	1991	CD FLAG 54
Dark Angel	Live Scars (LP, Album)	1990	M FLAG 42
Dark Angel	Live Scars (CD)	1990	CDMFLAG 42
Dark Angel	Leave Scars (LP, Album)	1989	FLAG 30
Dark Angel	Leave Scars (CD, Album)	1988	CD FLAG 30
Dark Angel	Darkness Descends (LP, Album)	1986	FLAG 6
Dark Angel	Darkness Descends (LP, Album)	1986	2356
Death	Fate (Cass, Comp)	1992	TMFLAG 71
Death	Fate (LP, Comp)	1992	M FLAG 71
Death	Fate (CD, Comp)	1992	CDMFLAG 71
Death	Spiritual Healing (Cass, Alb)	1990	T FLAG 38
Death	Spiritual Healing (LP, Pic, Album)	1990	FLAG 38 P
Death	Spiritual Healing (LP, Album)	1990	FLAG 38
Death	Spiritual Healing (CD, Album)	1990	CD FLAG 38
Death	Leprosy (Cass, Album)	1988	TFLAG24
Death	Leprosy (LP, Album, Pic)	1988	FLAG 24P
Death	Leprosy (LP, Album)	1988	FLAG 24
Death	Leprosy (CD, Album)	1988	CDFLAG24
Death	Scream Bloody Gore (LP, Album)	1987	FLAG 12
Death	Scream Bloody Gore (CD, Album)	1987	CD FLAG 12
Death	Scream Bloody Gore (LP, Album)	1987	2372
Death Angel	The Ultra-Violence (LP, Album)	1987	FLAG 14
Dethrone	Let The Day Begin (Album) (2 versions)	1989	FLAG 41
Dethrone	Let The Day Begin (LP, Album)	1989	FLAG 41
Dethrone	Let The Day Begin (LP, W/Lbl)	1989	FLAG 41
Dethrone	Let The Day Begin (CD, Album)	1989	CD FLAG 41
Detritus	Perpetual Defiance (Cass, Album)	1990	T FLAG 55
Detritus	Perpetual Defiance (LP, Album)	1990	FLAG 55
Detritus	Perpetual Defiance (CD, Album)	1990	CD FLAG 55
Devastation	Signs of Life (LP, Album)	1989	none
Devastation	Signs of Life (LP, Album)	1989	FLAG 44
Devastation	Signs of Life (CD, Album)	1989	CDFLAG 44
Dragon	Scream of Death (LP, Album)	1991	FLAG 58
Dragon	Scream of Death (CD, Album)	1991	CDFLAG 58
Dragon	Fallen Angel (LP, Album)	1990	FLAG 48
Dragon	Fallen Angel (CD, Album)	1990	CDFLAG 48
English Dogs	Where Legend Began (LP)	1987	2355
English Dogs	Where Legend Began (LP, Gat)	1986	FLAG4
English Dogs	Metalmorphosis (2 versions)	1986	12 FLAG 101
Faith Or Fear	Punishment Area (LP)	1989	FLAG 34
Faith Or Fear	Punishment Area (CD, Album)	1989	CD FLAG 34
Forbidden	Point of No Return (LP, Comp)	1992	MFLAG 73
Forbidden	Twisted into Form (LP, Album)	1990	FLAG 43
Forbidden	Twisted into Form (CD, Album)	1990	CD FLAG 43
Forbidden	Raw Evil – Live at the Dynamo (12")	1989	12 FLAG 108
Forbidden	Forbidden Evil (Album) (2 versions)	1988	FLAG 27
Forbidden	Forbidden Evil (LP, Album)	1988	FLAG 27
Forbidden	Forbidden Evil (LP)	1988	Flag 27
Forbidden	Forbidden Evil (CD, Album)	1988	CD FLAG 27
Forbidden	Forbidden Evil (LP, Album)	1988	102551
GBH	A Fridge Too Far (LP)	1990	?
Genitorturers	120 Days of Genitorture (CD, Album)	1993	CD FLAG 81
Hexx	Quest For Sanity (12", EP)	1988	M FLAG 22
Holy Terror	Mind Wars (Cass, Album)	1988	T FLAG 25
Holy Terror	Mind Wars (LP, Album)	1988	FLAG 25
Holy Terror	Mind Wars (CD, Album)	1988	CD FLAG 25
Holy Terror	Terror And Submission (LP)	1987	FLAG 10
Holy Terror	Terror And Submission (CD, Album, Unofficial)	1987	CD FLAG 10
Holy Terror	Terror And Submission (LP, Album)	1987	2371
Mortal Sin	Every Dog Has It's Day (LP, Album)	1991	FLAG 61
Mortal Sin	Every Dog Has It's Day (Album) (2 versions)	1991	CDFLAG 61
Mortal Sin	Every Dog Has It's Day (CD, Album)	1991	CDFLAG 61
Mortal Sin	Every Dog Has It's Day (CD, Album, Boo)	1991	CDFLAG 61
Nuclear Assault	Out of Order (Cass, Album)	1991	TFLAG 64
Nuclear Assault	Out of Order (LP, Album)	1991	Flag 64
Nuclear Assault	Out of Order (CD, Album)	1991	CD FLAG 64
Nuclear Assault	Handle With Care (LP, Album)	1989	FLAG 35
Nuclear Assault	Handle With Care (CD, Album)	1989	CD FLAG 35
Nuclear Assault	Survive (Cass, Album)	1988	TFLAG21
Nuclear Assault	Fight To Be Free (Cass, EP)	1988	T12Flag 105
Nuclear Assault	Fight To Be Free (12", EP, Ltd, Pos)	1988	PB 12 FLAG 105
Nuclear Assault	Survive (LP, Album, Pic)	1988	FLAG 21 P
Nuclear Assault	Survive (LP, Album)	1988	FLAG21
Nuclear Assault	Survive (CD, Album)	1988	CD FLAG 21
Nuclear Assault	Fight To Be Free (CD, EP)	1988	CD 12FLAG 105
Nuclear Assault	Good Times, Bad Times (12")	1988	12 FLAG 107
Nuclear Assault	Fight To Be Free (EP) (2 versions)	1988	12FLAG 105
Nuclear Assault	Fight To Be Free (12", EP, Ltd, Pos)	1988	12FLAG 105
Nuclear Assault	Fight To Be Free (12", EP)	1988	12 Flag 105
Nuclear Assault	The Plague (12", MiniAlbum)	1987	M FLAG 13
Nuclear Assault	Game Over (CD)	1987	CD FLAG 5
Nuclear Assault	The Plague (12", MiniAlbum)	1987	2382
Nuclear Assault	Game Over (LP, Album)	1986	FLAG 5
Nuclear Assault	Brain Death (12")	1986	12 FLAG 102
Onslaught	Power From Hell (CD, Album, RE)	1993	PCCY-00480
Onslaught	Let There Be Rock (12", Pic)	1987	P12FLAG 103
Onslaught	Let There Be Rock (7", Promo, S/Sided)	1987	FLAG 103 ADJ
Onslaught	Power From Hell (LP, Album, RE)	1987	88561-8173-1
Onslaught	Let There Be Rock (12")	1987	12FLAG 103
Onslaught	The Force (Cass, Alb)	1986	T FLAG 1
Onslaught	Power From Hell (LP, Album, RE)	1986	FLAG 7
Onslaught	The Force (LP, Album)	1986	FLAG 1
Onslaught	The Force (CD, Album)	1986	CD FLAG 1
Overdose	Progress of Decadence (CD, Album)	1994	CDFLAG 83
Overkill	!!!Fuck You!!! (12")	1987	12 FLAG 104
Possessed	The Eyes of Horror (12", EP)	1987	M FLAG 16
Possessed	Beyond The Gates / The Eyes of Horror (Comp) (2 versions)	1987	CD FLAG 3
Possessed	Beyond The Gates / The Eyes of Horror (CD, Comp)	1987	CD FLAG 3
Possessed	Beyond The Gates / The Eyes of Horror (CD, Comp, RE)	1988	CD FLAG 3
Possessed	Beyond The Gates (Album) (2 versions)	1986	FLAG 3
Possessed	Beyond The Gates (LP, Album)	1987	FLAG 3
Possessed	Beyond The Gates (LP, Album, Gat)	1986	FLAG 3
Praying Mantis	Predator in Disguise (CD, Album)	1993	CDFLAG 77
Raven	Nothing Exceeds Like Excess (LP, Album)	1988	FLAG 28
Raven	Nothing Exceeds Like Excess (CD, Album)	1988	CDFLAG 28
Raven	Nothing Exceeds Like Excess (LP, Album)	1988	102351
Re-Animator	That Was Then... This Is Now (Album) (2 versions)	1992	FLAG 67
Re-Animator	That Was Then... This Is Now (LP, Album)	1992	FLAG 67
Re-Animator	That Was Then... This Is Now (CD, Album)	1992	FLAG 67
Re-Animator	Laughing (LP)	1991	FLAG 53
Re-Animator	Laughing (CD, Album)	1991	CDFLAG 53
Re-Animator	Condemned To Eternity/Deny Reality (CD, Comp)	1990	MCD 1065-2
Re-Animator	Condemned To Eternity (LP, Album)	1990	FLAG 37
Re-Animator	Condemned To Eternity/Deny Reality (CD, Comp)	1990	CSCS 5261
Re-Animator	Condemned To Eternity/Deny Reality (CD, Comp)	1990	CD FLAG 37
Re-Animator	Deny Reality (LP, MiniAlbum)	1989	M FLAG 32
Re-Animator	Deny Reality (LP, MiniAlbum)	1989	103011
Ripping Corpse	Dreaming with the Dead (LP, Album)	1991	FLAG 57
Ripping Corpse	Dreaming with the Dead (CD, Album)	1991	CDFLAG 57
Sacrilege	Turn Back Trilobite (LP, Gat)	1989	FLAG 29
Sacrilege	Turn Back Trilobite (CD, Album)	1989	CD FLAG 29
Sacrilege	Within The Prophecy (12", Album, W/Lbl)	1987	FLAG 15
Sacrilege	Within The Prophecy (LP, Album)	1987	FLAG 15
Sarcofago	The Laws of Scourge (Cass, Album)	1992	MASS 0008
Sarcofago	The Laws of Scourge (CD, Album)	1992	CDFLAG 66
Sarcófago	The Laws of Scourge (Cass, Album)	1992	TMNF 66
Sarcófago	The Laws of Scourge (LP, Album)	1992	FLAG 66
Sarcófago	Rotting (Cass, MiniAlbum)	1989	TFLAG52
Sarcófago	Rotting (MiniAlbum) (2 versions)	1989	FLAG 52
Sarcófago	Rotting (12", MiniAlbum)	1989	FLAG 52
Sarcófago	Rotting (CD, MiniAlbum)	1989	CDFLAG 52
Sarcófago	Rotting (12", MiniAlbum, Promo, W/Lbl)	1991	FLAG 52
Seventh Angel	Lament for the Weary (Vinyl, Album)	1992	FLAG 65
Seventh Angel	Lament for the Weary (CD, Album)	1992	CDFLAG 65
Seventh Angel	The Torment (Cass, Album)	1990	TFLAG 51
Seventh Angel	The Torment (LP, Album)	1990	FLAG 51
Seventh Angel	The Torment (CD, Album)	1990	CDFLAG 51
Turbo	Dead End (LP, Album)	1990	FLAG 47
Turbo	Dead End (CD, Album)	1990	CDFLAG 47
Various	Speed Kills 6 – Violence of the Slams (2xLP, Comp)	1992	FLAG 69
Various	Speed Kills 6: Violence of the Slams (CD, Comp)	1992	CD FLAG 69
Various	Speed Kills 5: Head Crushing Metal (Cass, Comp)	1990	TFLAG 46
Various	Speed Kills 5 Head Crushing Metal (2xLP, Comp)	1990	FLAG 46
Various	Speed Kills 5: Head Crushing Metal (CD, Comp)	1990	CD FLAG 46
Various	Speed Kills...But Who's Dying? (2xLP, Comp)	1989	FLAG 33
Various	Speed Kills...But Who's Dying? (CD, Comp)	1989	CD FLAG 33
Various	Speed Kills III – A Catalogue of Destruction (LP)	1987	FLAG 17
Various	Speed Kills II – The Mayhem Continues... (LP)	1986	FLAG 2
Venom	The Waste Lands (LP, Album)	1992	FLAG 72
Venom	The Waste Lands (CD, Album)	1992	CD FLAG 72
Venom	Temples of Ice (LP)	1991	FLAG 56
Venom	Temples of Ice (CD, Album)	1991	CDFLAG 56
Venom	... Tear Your Soul Apart (12", EP)	1990	-
Venom	... Tear Your Soul Apart (CD, EP)	1990	CDMFLAG 50
Venom	Prime Evil (Cass, Album)	1989	TFLAG 36
Venom	Prime Evil (LP, Album, Pic, Ltd)	1989	-
Venom	Prime Evil (Album) (3 versions)	1989	FLAG 36
Venom	Prime Evil (LP, Album)	1989	FLAG 36
Venom	Prime Evil (LP, Album)	1990	-
Venom	Prime Evil (LP, Album, TP)	1989	FLAG 36
Venom	Prime Evil (Album) (2 versions)	1989	CD FLAG 36
Venom	Prime Evil (CD, Album)	1992	CD FLAG 36
Venom	Prime Evil (CD, Album)	1989	CD FLAG 36
Venom	Prime Evil (Cass, Album)	1989	104614
Venom	Prime Evil (LP, Album)	1989	104611
Wolf Spider	Drifting in the Sullen Sea (LP, Album)	1991	FLAG 63
Wolf Spider	Drifting in the Sullen Sea (CD, Album)	1991	CDFLAG 063
Wolf Spider	Kingdom of Paranoia (LP, Album)	1990	FLAG 49
Wolf Spider	Kingdom of Paranoia (CD, Album)	1990	CDFLAG 49

== See also ==
- List of record labels
