= Bathory (band) =

Swedish extreme metal band

- Quorthon in May 1987

Background information
- Origin: Vällingby, Sweden
- Genres: Black metal; Viking metal; thrash metal
- Years active: 1983–2004
- Labels: Tyfon Grammofon; Under One Flag; Black Mark Production; Noise International
- Past members: Quorthon; Frederick Melander (Freddan/Hanoi); Björn Kristensen (The Animal); Jonas Åkerlund; Ribban; Stefan Larsson; Adde; Christer Sandström; Christian "Witchhunter" Dudek; Paul Pålle Lundburg; Kothaar; Vvornth

Bathory was a Swedish extreme metal band formed in Vällingby in March 1983. Frontman and songwriter Thomas "Quorthon" Forsberg was the sole constant member, and at times responsible for all instruments.

Named after Hungarian countess Elizabeth Báthory, Bathory is considered a pioneer of black metal (alongside Venom, Hellhammer and Mercyful Fate) and Viking metal. The book Lords of Chaos described Bathory's first four albums (Note: Bathory (1984); The Return...... (1985); Under the Sign of the Black Mark (1987); Blood Fire Death (1988)) as "the blueprint for Scandinavian black metal."

The band stopped performing live early on and never toured. Bathory dissolved when Quorthon died from heart failure at age 38 in June 2004.

== History ==
=== Early years (1980s) ===
Bathory formed in Vällingby on 16 March 1983. 17-year old guitarist Quorthon (then known as "Ace Shoot", a name inspired by sex jokes, two Motörhead songs – "Ace of Spades" and "Sharpshooter" – and Ace Frehley of Kiss), was joined by bassist Frederick Melander ("Hanoi") and drummer Jonas Åkerlund ("Vans McBurger"). Åkerlund has stated that he and Melander were the original members and Quorthon joined later, when they were looking for a vocalist/guitarist.

Quorthon mentioned in a 1994 interview that previous band names included Satan, Death, and Nosferatu. According to Quorthon, he settled on Bathory after a visit to the London Dungeon, although Åkerlund says that it was inspired by the Venom song "Countess Bathory", based on alleged serial murderer Elizabeth Báthory.

The other members hired a singer in the winter of 1983–84, since the drummer was unsatisfied with Quorthon's vocals. Quorthon compared the new singer to a mix of Ian Gillan and Ronnie James Dio. The singer was interviewed in 2001, where his nickname, The Animal, was revealed.

Quorthon worked part-time at record label Tyfon Grammofon, owned by his father, Börje "Boss" Forsberg (1944-2017). In late 1983, the label was putting together a compilation of songs by Scandinavian metal bands. At the last minute, one of the bands backed out. Tyfon agreed to let Bathory appear on the record. The album, Scandinavian Metal Attack, was released in March 1984 and was Bathory's first appearance on record. The two Bathory tracks, "Sacrifice" and "The Return of Darkness and Evil", drew fan mail. Bob Muldowney gave the band a positive review in a July 1984 issue of Kick Ass magazine, saying the band's tracks showed "a very heavy sound [and] killer vocals."

Soon after, Tyfon asked Quorthon to record a full-length album. His bandmates having moved away, Quorthon recruited bassist Rickard Bergman from his former oi-punk band Stridskuk, and drummer Stefan Larsson from punk band Obsklass. On 22 May 1984, they had their only rehearsal together before recording the album. The songs "Witchcraft" and "Satan My Master" were recorded at the 22 May rehearsal and were the first recording by the debut album line-up. The two tracks were later released on the Jubileum Volume III album. The debut album, Bathory, was recorded in June at Heavenshore Studio in Stockholm and released in October that year. The band worked on an EP in early November, under the working titles Necronomicon and Maleficarum, though the release of the four-track album, which included "Children of the Beast", "Crown of Thorns one the Golden Throne", "Crucifix" and "Necronomicon", was cancelled because it didn't show enough progress from their earlier material, and the release date of December would have been difficult to meet.

Bathory released The Return...... in 1985 and stopped performing live that year. Quorthon deemed organizing concerts too much hassle.

The band began to record the album Okkulta following the release of their previous album, but decided not to continue with it after recording several songs, as the album did not develop their sound further. The songs "Black Leather Wings, Hellfire, Majestica Satanica, Circle of Blood, Wicca, The Call from the Grave ... and Undead" were recorded during the session.

Christian "Witchhunter" Dudek, of German thrash metal band Sodom, joined Bathory for several months in 1986.

The band recorded Under the Sign of the Black Mark in 1986 and released it the following year. The next album, Blood Fire Death, was recorded and released in 1988.

Quorthon began working on a double album, tentatively titled Valhalla. Some songs were Viking metal, while others were speed metal. The band recorded two Queen covers, "Now I'm Here" and "Ogre Battle", during the recording sessions. Several songs taken from those sessions, including Burnin' Leather and Rider at the Gate of Dawn, were later released on the Jubileum compilation albums.

=== Viking metal years (1990s) ===
Although Bathory's fourth album, Blood Fire Death (1988), followed in the style of the albums before it, some songs had a different style. These songs had a slower tempo, acoustic passages, choral background singing, and lyrics about Vikings and Norse mythology. Music critic Eduardo Rivadavia of AllMusic describes this style as "possibly the first true example" of Viking metal.

Quorthon worked on an album called Requiem, unrelated to the later album of the same name. He said in a 1998 interview that only two or three tracks from the Requiem album had progressed to the stage where vocals were added. The band felt that the Requiem sessions weren't "fresh or good enough."

After Blood Fire Death, the band shed its black metal style. Their fifth album, Hammerheart (1990), was the first "archetypical [sic] Viking metal album". This was said to be influenced by American power metal band Manowar, although Quorthon described this rumour as "another total misconception", but admitted that "heavy Manowar beat seemed to perfectly suit my new ideas for lyrics at the time". A music video was made for the song "One Rode to Asa Bay", which Quorthon regretted, partly because the released music video was "raw" rather than a proper mix. The style of Hammerheart continued on Twilight of the Gods (1991). Quorthon was unsure of what to do following the release of the album, describing it as "no exit except repeating ourselves", so the band took a break and released the Jubileum compilation albums, with the first release marking the tenth anniversary of the band.

Blood on Ice, recorded in 1989, was completed in 1996 and released that year.

=== Thrash metal years (mid to late 1990s) ===
With Requiem (1994) and Octagon (1995), Bathory changed style again, this time turning to retro Bay Area thrash.

=== Transitional and return to Viking metal (2000s) ===
The 2001 release Destroyer of Worlds was a transitional album. Quorthon remarked in a 2003 interview that the album was "a mistake", as people did not anticipate the band's new direction, singing about "Harley Davidsons [and] ice hockey." The album's poor reception led to a return to Viking metal with the releases of Nordland I (2002) and Nordland II (2003).

=== Quorthon's death ===
In June 2004, Quorthon was found dead in his home, apparently due to heart failure. On 3 June 2006, Black Mark Production released a box set in tribute to Quorthon, containing "three CDs, one DVD, a book and a poster."

Several Bathory tribute albums have been compiled by black metal artists, such as In Conspiracy with Satan – A Tribute to Bathory and Voices from Valhalla – A Tribute to Bathory. In August 2004, several members of the Norwegian black metal scene performed Bathory songs in a set titled A Tribute to Quorthon at the Hole in the Sky festival in Bergen, Norway. The lineup included Abbath (Immortal), Apollyon (Aura Noir), Faust and Samoth (Emperor and Zyklon), Gaahl (Gorgoroth), Grutle Kjellson and Ivar Bjørnson (Enslaved), Nocturno Culto (Darkthrone) and Satyr (Satyricon).

== Musical style ==
Bathory's early work was dark, fast, heavily distorted and raw recording (lo-fi). Quorthon's vocals were harsh, high-pitched and raspy with occasional shrieks and screams. The band's lyrics focused on 'dark' topics and included anti-Christian and 'Satanic' references. These traits came to define black metal and the band used this style on their first four albums. Quorthon said that the band were not Satanists but used 'Satanic' references to provoke and attack Christianity. With the third and fourth albums he began "attacking Christianity from a different angle", realizing that Satanism is a "Christian product" and seeing them both as "religious hocus-pocus".

Quorthon described Bathory's early sound as a "mixture" of Black Sabbath, Motörhead and GBH, singling out GBH's album City Baby Attacked by Rats and Motörhead's Ace of Spades and Iron Fist, and was also influenced by the Exploited, Sex Pistols, Disorder, Riot/Clone, Anti-Nowhere League, Kiss, Anti Cimex, Asocial, Mob 47 and Exciter. The term "black metal" came from Venom's 1982 album of that name. Many fans and reviewers have claimed Venom was an influence on Bathory, or even accused Bathory of copying Venom. Quorthon often denied being influenced by Venom and claimed that he "heard Venom for the first time in late 1984 or early 1985" and never owned a Venom album. However, he admitted in an interview for Metal Forces that he first listened to Venom's Black Metal in 1983 and considered it "one of the best albums ever made." Bathory's early sound has been associated with Slayer but Quorthon denied being influenced by them.

Bathory's music is described as "primitive, evil, fast and raw." Their music also contained references to Satanism, and according to Alex Distefano of OC Weekly, "the band drew in dark forces" with its approach. The band's music has drawn comparisons to Hellhammer, Celtic Frost, Venom and Mayhem.

Bathory had several stylistic changes throughout its career. Initially a black metal act, the band began to explore more progressive and experimental styles, starting with their fourth album Blood Fire Death (1988), which is regarded as a key influence in the early development of Viking metal. Subsequent albums, including Hammerheart (1990) and Twilight of the Gods (1991), saw Bathory move from the black metal style of their first four albums towards Viking metal with progressive textures, while the latter album also leaned towards epic doom and classical influences. The band continued in the style of Viking metal for most of their remaining existence, although they experimented with a thrash metal style on the albums Requiem (1994) and Octagon (1995). Eduardo Rivadavia of AllMusic wrote: "Bathory's development from the rawest form of embryonic black metal, to thrash, death, and back to its self-devised Viking-themed black metal, has mirrored and regularly defined the genre's very evolution."

== Legacy ==
The book Lords of Chaos described Bathory's first four albums as "the blueprint for Scandinavian black metal." Black metal acts influenced by Bathory's early records include Mayhem, Burzum, Darkthrone and Frost of Satyricon. Ambient rock band Vision Eternel also cited Bathory as influential, singling out the albums Hammerheart and Twilight of the Gods.

A Bathory box set was released in June 2006.

Swedish black metal band Watain played a live tribute to Quorthon and Bathory at the Sweden Rock Festival in 2010. The resulting recording was the limited-edition album Tonight We Raise Our Cups and Toast in Angels Blood: A Tribute to Bathory with 7 tracks, and was released on 23 February 2015. It was also released as on 12-inch vinyl album, the latter in 1300 numbered copies with four tracks, "A Fine Day to Die", "The Return of Darkness and Evil", "Rite of Darkness" and "Reaper" on Side A and three tracks "Enter the Eternal Fire", "Sacrifice" and "Born for Burning" on Side B. The release proved very popular with Swedish public, with the limited vinyl edition reaching number 1 on the vinyl chart. The album made it also to number 2 on the national Sverigetopplistan chart, the official Swedish Albums Chart in February 2015. In 2016, the staff of Loudwire ranked them 36th on their list of the greatest heavy metal bands of all time.

== Band members ==
Core member

- Quorthon (Thomas Börje Forsberg) – vocals, guitars, bass, occasional drums, songwriting (1983–2004)

Principal creative force of Bathory. He performed the majority of instruments on most studio recordings, often using pseudonyms in the early years. Quorthon remained the sole consistent member until his death in 2004.

Early members

- Vans McBurger (Jonas Åkerlund) – drums (1983–1984). Later became an acclaimed music video and film director.
- Frederick Melander (also known as "Freddan" or "Hanoi") – bass (1983–1984)
- The Animal (1983) – vocals
- Ribban (Rickard Bergman) – bass (1984)
- Stefan Larsson – drums (1984–1986)
- Andreas Johansson ("Adde") – bass (1985)
- Christer Sandström – bass (1986–1987)
- Christian "Witchhunter" Dudek – drums (1986)
- Paul Lundburg – drums (1986–1987)

Session / pseudonymous members

- Kothaar – credited as bass (1988–1996, studio only)
- Vvornth – credited as drums (1988–1996, studio only)

The identities behind these pseudonyms were never officially revealed; Quorthon stated in a 2003 interview that he believed that he played the bass on the Hammerheart album.

=== Timeline ===
Bathory’s line-up was unstable in its first years, but after the mid-1980s Quorthon largely worked alone. From Blood Fire Death (1988) onward, most recordings featured him performing nearly all instruments, with occasional use of anonymous session musicians.

== Lineups ==
Period	Members	Releases
1983	Vans McBurger – drums; Hanoi – bass	None
1983	Quorthon (Thomas Börje Forsberg) - vocals; Vans McBurger – drums; Hanoi – bass	None
1983	Quorthon - guitars; The Animal - vocals; Vans McBurger – drums; Hanoi – bass	None
June 1983	Quorthon - guitars, vocals; Johan Elven – drums; Rickard Bergman – bass	Die in Fire and You Don't Move Me demos
January 1984	Quorthon – vocals, guitar, production; Vans McBurger – drums	2 tracks (Sacrifice and The Return of Darkness and Evil) on Scandinavian Metal Attack (March 1984)
1984	Quorthon – vocals, guitar, production; Stefan Larsson – drums; Rickard Bergman – bass guitar	22 May rehearsal; Bathory (1984)
1985	Quorthon – guitars, vocals, additional bass, production, cover design, back cover photography; Andreas Johansson – bass, back cover photography; Stefan Larsson – drums, back cover photography	The Return...... (1985)
September 1986	Quorthon – guitar, vocals, bass guitar, drums, synthesizer, producer, mixing, cover design; Christer Sandström – additional bass guitar; Paul Pålle Lundberg – drums	Under the Sign of the Black Mark (1987)
1988 – 1990	Quorthon – vocals, guitar; Kothaar – bass; Vvornth – drums	Blood Fire Death (1988); Hammerheart (1990)
1991	Quorthon – vocals, all instruments	Twilight of the Gods (1991)
1994 – 1996	Quorthon – vocals, guitar; Kothaar – bass; Vvornth – drums	Requiem (1994); Octagon (1995); Blood on Ice (1996)
2001 – June 2004	Quorthon – vocals, all instruments	Destroyer of Worlds (2001); Nordland I (2002); Nordland II (2003)

== Discography ==
=== Studio albums ===
- Bathory (1984)
- The Return...... (1985)
- Under the Sign of the Black Mark (1987)
- Blood Fire Death (1988)
- Hammerheart (1990)
- Twilight of the Gods (1991)
- Requiem (1994)
- Octagon (1995)
- Blood on Ice (1996)
- Destroyer of Worlds (2001)
- Nordland I (2002)
- Nordland II (2003)

=== Compilation albums ===
- Jubileum Volume I (1992)
- Jubileum Volume II (1993)
- Jubileum Volume III (1998)
- Katalog (2001)
- In Memory of Quorthon (2006)

== Bibliography ==
- Ekeroth, Daniel (2008). Swedish Death Metal. Bazillion Points Books. ISBN 978-0-9796163-1-0.
- Johannesson, Ika; Klingberg, Jon Jefferson (2011). Blod Eld Död – En svensk metalhistoria. Alfabeta Bokförlag AB. ISBN 978-9-1501133-4-1.
