= Black Mark Production =

Independent record label

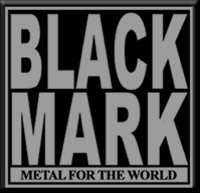
- Founded: 1991
- Distributor: Relapse Records (US)
- Genre: Heavy metal, extreme metal
- Country of origin: Sweden
- Location: Bruzaholm, Sweden
- Official website: www.blackmark.net

Black Mark Production (founded 1991) is an independent record label originally based in Berlin, later on with offices in Stockholm, Toronto and New York City.

Black Mark Production today is a worldwide operating business placed in Villa Hammerheart, Bruzaholm, Sweden, that specializes in extreme metal releases. It is perhaps best known for its close connection to Quorthon, leader of the defining black metal band Bathory until his death in 2004.

== History ==
Quorthon created the name Black Mark Production as an "imaginary label"; it was not until shortly before the release of the album Twilight of the Gods that the label itself was officially created. It incorrectly speculated that he was involved with the business and operation of Black Mark Production, though he did give the label its name. Quorthon received permission from the Tyfon Grammofon label (which was owned by Quorthon's father, Börje "Boss" Forsberg, and featured Bathory) to use his own proxy-label on all Bathory albums, along with a unique 666-X serial number, starting with the self-titled debut album from 1984.

== Roster ==
- 8 Foot Sativa
- Agressor
- Bathory
- Cemetary
- Dan Swanö
- Edge of Sanity
- Fleshcrawl
- Invocator
- Lake of Tears
- Memento Mori
- Morgana Lefay
- Necrophobic
- Nightingale
- Overload
- Quorthon
- Seance
- Stone

== See also ==
- List of record labels
