= Cultural influence of Holst's The Planets =

Seven-movement astrology-themed suite as featured in works of art

Gustav Holst's suite The Planets has been the subject of frequent adaptations and additions, and many later works, particularly in popular music, have been derived from it. There are numerous references to the suite in popular culture.

== Adaptations ==
=== Non-orchestral arrangements ===
- Piano duet (four hands) – an engraved copy of Holst's own piano duet arrangement was found by John York.
- Two pianos (duo) – Holst had originally sketched the work for two pianos, due to a need to compensate for the neuritis in his right arm. His two friends, Nora Day and Vally Lasker, had agreed to play the two-piano arrangement for him as he dictated the details of the orchestral score to them. This they wrote down themselves on the two-piano score, and used as a guide when it was time to create the full orchestral score. The two-piano arrangement was published in 1949. Holst's original manuscripts for it are now in the holdings of the Royal College of Music (Mars, Venus, Saturn, Uranus, Neptune), Royal Academy of Music (Mercury) and British Library (Jupiter, Saturn, Uranus).
- Pianola – In the early 1990s an arrangement was made for piano rolls by the English pianolist, Rex Lawson, and published on the Perforetur label.
- Organ – American harpsichordist and organist Peter Sykes transcribed The Planets for organ.
- Ensemble or Chamber Orchestra – English orchestrator George Morton transcribed The Planets for 15-piece ensemble or chamber orchestra.
- Moog – Isao Tomita adapted The Planets for a Moog and other synthesizers and electronic devices. The original LP release prompted legal action from Holst's estate. The composer's daughter, Imogen Holst, worked hard to prevent the recording being distributed in the UK.
- Brass instruments – Hungarian trombonist and arranger Áron Simon transcribed the Mars movement for 6 trombones, euphonium, tuba, timpani and percussion.
- Brass band – Stephen Roberts, associate conductor of the English Symphony Orchestra, transcribed the entire suite for brass band.
- Marching band – the movements Mars, Venus and Jupiter have all been arranged for marching band by Jay Bocook. Paul Murtha also arranged the chorale section of Jupiter for marching band., Kevin Shah and Tony Nunez created the work "Bringer of Joy", based on "Jupiter".
- Percussion ensemble – James Ancona arranged Mercury for a percussion ensemble. It consisted of 2 glockenspiels, 2 xylophones, 2 vibraphones, 2 marimbas, 5 timpani, a small suspended cymbal, and 2 triangles.
- Drum corps – selections from The Planets were performed by The Cavaliers as part of their 1985 repertoire, and as the entirety of their 1995 feature field show, as well as appearing in their 2017 production Men Are From Mars.
- Rock bands:
  - Death metal band Aeon recorded a version of "Neptune, the Mystic" for their album Aeons Black. Though much shorter than the original it was derived from a select few of the main melodies
  - Emerson, Lake & Powell recorded a version of "Mars, the Bringer of War" for their self-titled 1986 album. Cozy Powell, the band's drummer, joined Black Sabbath after Emerson, Lake & Powell disbanded and included samples from "Mars" in his drum solos on Black Sabbath's 1990 concert tour.
  - Manfred Mann's Earth Band used "Jupiter, bringer of joy" for his song "Joybringer".
  - The 1985 album Beyond the Planets, by Jeff Wayne, Rick Wakeman and Kevin Peek (with narration by Patrick Allen), is a rock arrangement of the entire suite.
- In 2020, the Jeremy Levy Jazz Orchestra released The Planets: Reimagined, recasting all seven movements into a jazz arrangement. Levy's arrangement of "Uranus: The Magician" received a Grammy nomination for 'Best Arrangement, Instrumental or A Cappella' at the 2021 Grammy Awards show.

=== "Thaxted" from Jupiter ===
The most-adapted part of The Planets is an anthemic melody found in the central section of Jupiter. In 1921, Holst was asked to write a melody for the poem "I Vow to Thee, My Country" by Sir Cecil Spring Rice. According to his daughter Imogen Holst, at the time he "was so over-worked and over-weary that he felt relieved to discover they 'fitted' the tune from Jupiter". The poem and hymn "I Vow to Thee, My Country" became known as a response to the human cost of World War I. The hymn was first performed in 1925 and quickly became a patriotic anthem. Imogen commented in 1968 that for more than half a century the hymn had been affecting the original Jupiter with "unwanted associations". In 1926, the melody was published on its own, as part of the hymnal Songs of Praise. Holst gave it the name "Thaxted", after Thaxted, Essex, the English village where he lived much of his life.

Other hymns that use the melody include "O God beyond all praising" and "We Praise You and Acknowledge You" with lyrics by the Rev. Stephen P. Starke.

Secular settings of the melody include:

- "World in Union" (1991), with lyrics by Charlie Skarbek, first recorded by Kiri Te Kanawa. The song is used as the theme song for the Rugby World Cup and appears in most television coverage and before matches.
- "Jupiter" (2003) by Japanese singer Ayaka Hirahara with lyrics by 吉元 由美 (Yoshimoto Yumi). It went to No. 2 on the Oricon charts and sold nearly a million copies, making it the third-best-selling single in the Japanese popular music market for 2004. It remained on the charts for over three years. The lyrics are in Japanese, except for "Every day I listen to my heart".

Uses of the wordless melody include the video games Cyber Troopers Virtual-On Force, Civilization V and Battlefield V. The English heavy metal band Saxon also used the melody as an introduction to their gigs in the late 1980s.

== In film and television ==
- The Quatermass Experiment, a 1953 BBC series, features "Mars" in its opening credits.
- The Man Who Fell to Earth features excerpts of Venus and Mars.
- The True Believers, a 1988 Australian historical political drama, used Jupiter as its title theme, as composer William Motzing thought it to be so fitting that he doubted he could compose anything better.
- Wallace and Gromit: The Curse of the Were-Rabbit (2005). While the suite was spoofed as The Plants, Venus was briefly heard when Gromit tucks his pillow on his melon just before going to bed.
- BoJack Horseman episode "That’s Too Much, Man!" features an extract from Venus near the end of the episode.
- The Simpsons episode "'Scuse Me While I Miss the Sky" features extracts of the beginning of Jupiter due to astronomy being the main subject of the episode.
- The Simpsons episode "The Regina Monologues" features an extract from Mars in a flashback scene to World War II.
- Mars is used as the opening and closing theme music for the 6-part 1958/1959 BBC TV science fiction serial Quatermass and the Pit.
- Mr. Robot features Neptune in the pre-credits sequence of season 2 episode 4.
- The Venture Bros. Season 2 Episode 2 "Hate Floats" features Henchmen 21 and 24 comedically singing the opening of Mars as they gear up to prepare to return to their duties as henchmen.
- An arrangement of a small excerpt of Jupiter appears in the game Persona 3 Portable under the filename "EVE_511". However, it was not released as part of the official soundtrack.
- Bluey episode "Sleepytime" quotes Jupiter extensively during a dream sequence set among the planets.
- Space: 1999 episode "Space Brain" features most of Mars (composer uncredited) near the end of the episode.
- The video game Ape Escape 3 features an arrangement of Mars as the theme for its final level, "TV Space Station".

== Music inspired by The Planets ==
- King Crimson's song "The Devil's Triangle" from the 1970 album In the Wake of Poseidon was adapted from "Mars". The band had begun playing "Mars" at their live shows in 1969.
- The main riff from the 1970 song "Black Sabbath" and the bridge from the 1971 song "Children of the Grave", both by Black Sabbath, are loosely based on "Mars."
- John Williams used the melodies and instrumentation of Mars as the inspiration for "The Imperial March" and "Imperial Attack" themes in his soundtrack for the Star Wars films.
- Bill Conti was strongly influenced by Neptune and Jupiter in his soundtrack for the 1983 film The Right Stuff.
- The Airship theme, a recurring theme since Super Mario Bros. 3, is based on Mars.
- Hans Zimmer closely used the melodies, instrumentation and orchestration of Mars as the inspiration for his soundtrack for the movie Gladiator to the extent that a lawsuit for copyright infringement was filed by the Holst foundation.
- Star Trek incorporates Elements from "Jupiter". Especially the ending of the piece is obviously the Inspiration for the Main Theme and the end credits.
- Technical death metal band Nile sampled Mars for the intro of their song "Ramses Bringer of War" from the 1998 album Amongst the Catacombs of Nephren-Ka.

== Additions by other composers ==
Two planets are notably not included in The Planets: Earth and Pluto. Holst had not wanted to include the Earth in his suite because the suite was based on astrology, and Earth has no astrological significance. Pluto was discovered in 1930, four years before Holst's death, and was hailed by astronomers as the ninth planet. (In 2006 it was redesignated as a dwarf planet.) Holst expressed no interest in writing a movement for the new planet as he had become disillusioned by the popularity of the suite, believing that it took too much attention away from his other works.

In the final broadcast of his Young People's Concerts series in March 1972, conductor and composer Leonard Bernstein led the New York Philharmonic through a fairly straight interpretation of the suite, though he discarded the Saturn movement because he thought the theme of old age was irrelevant to a concert for children. The broadcast concluded with an improvised performance he called "Pluto, the Unpredictable".

In 1999, the Hallé Orchestra commissioned English composer Colin Matthews, an authority on Holst, to write a new eighth movement, which he called "Pluto, the Renewer". Matthews also changed the ending of "Neptune" slightly so that the movement would lead directly into "Pluto". Matthews dedicated the addition to the late Imogen Holst, Gustav Holst's daughter, who had been an acquaintance of his. The new movement was first performed in Manchester on 11 May 2000, with Kent Nagano conducting the Hallé Orchestra. Matthews speculated that, the dedication notwithstanding, Imogen Holst "would have been both amused and dismayed by the venture."

In 2012, the Philharmonia Orchestra commissioned British composer Joby Talbot to write an ending movement to The Planets as part of their “Universe of Sound” project. Talbot called the piece “Worlds, Stars, Systems, Infinity”, and like Colin Matthews’s Pluto movement, this piece emerges from Neptune without a break, coming out of the final chords from the voices. It was premiered in an experimental fashion with Esa-Pekka Salonen conducting.

Japanese composer Jun Nagao arranged The Planets for the Trouvère Quartet in 2003, and added movements for both Earth and Pluto. He arranged the suite for concert band in 2014, and included in that arrangement other popular Holst melodies as well.

== Other influence ==
- Robert A. Heinlein's 1961 novel, Stranger in a Strange Land, references The Planets, using Mars, the Bringer of War as Mars' anthem to be played when Valentine Michael Smith visits the White House as an emissary from Mars.
- In 2014, Bell's Brewery released its "The Planets Series" of seven beers inspired by Holst's The Planets.

== Sources ==
- Holst, Imogen (1986). The Music of Gustav Holst. Oxford and New York: Oxford University Press. ISBN 978-0-19-315458-2.
