= House of Metal =

Annual music festival in Umeå, Sweden

- Genre: Metal
- Dates: February and March
- Years active: 2007–present
- Website: houseofmetal.se/en

House of Metal is a metal music festival in Umeå, Sweden, that was conducted for the first time on 16–17 February 2007.

HoM has three different stages for bands of varying size and as well as an additional stage for cover bands. Every year appear about 25 bands from Sweden and the rest of the world.

The 14th edition of House of Metal festival will be at Umeå Folkets Hus, 28-29 February 2020.

== Lineup ==
=== 2007 ===
- Dream Evil
- Entombed
- Satyricon
- Hardcore Superstar
- Soilwork
- Persuader
- Pain
- 6th Awakening
- Apostasy
- Assailant
- Daemonicus
- Destynation
- Enter the Hunt
- Freak Kitchen
- Grabbe & Volymen
- Heed
- Hellfueled
- Lesra
- Lethal
- Live Elephant
- Meltdown
- My Own Grave
- Savage Circus

=== 2008 ===
- Nocturnal Rites
- Candlemass
- Meshuggah
- Naglfar
- Freedom Call
- Sonic Syndicate
- Unleashed
- Caliber 69
- Dead End
- Decadense
- Easy Action
- Feral
- Ghamorian
- God Among Insects
- Grabbe & Volymen
- Heat
- Heel
- Plector
- Scar Symmetry
- The Final Crap
- The Manic Episode
- The Royal Jester
- Torn Apart
- X-bone Pirates

=== 2009 ===
- Amon Amarth
- Nifelheim
- Torture Division
- Opeth
- The Haunted
- Mustasch
- Stormwarrior
- April Divine
- Arized
- Danko Jones
- Dawn of Silence
- Death Maze
- Grabbe & Volymen
- Guillotine
- Hate Ammo
- Hellmasker
- Los Bastardos
- Misantropic
- Moloken
- Redlight Attraction
- Remasculate
- Saint Daemon
- Sanctification
- The Final Crap

=== 2010 ===
- 8-Point Rose
- Apocalyst
- August Burns Red
- Behemoth
- Between the Buried and Me
- Bonnie Lee
- Coldspell
- Cynical Hatred
- Dead By April
- Fatal Smile
- Helltrain
- Hypocrisy
- Job For a Cowboy
- Lamb of God
- Lesra
- Marduk
- Necrophobic
- One Arm Short
- Persuader
- Raging Steel
- ReinXeed
- Revolverdog
- Scar Symmetry
- Sons of Guns
- Three Minute Madness

=== 2011 ===
- Aeon
- Bullet
- Dark Tranquillity
- Engel
- F.K.Ü
- Ghost
- Impaled Nazarene
- Samael
- U.D.O.
- Bonnie Lee
- Crowdburn
- Godless Glenn and the Astro Zombies
- Hostile Reaction
- Iscaroth
- Katana
- Live Elephant
- RAM
- Ramin Kuntopolku
- Sad But True
- Scumkill
- Summoned Tide
- System Annihilated
- TNT
- Trident
- Triptykon
- Twins Crew

=== 2012 ===
- Adept
- Amon Amarth
- Amaranthe
- Entombed
- Immortal
- Nocturnal Rites
- Tiamat
- Hail of Bullets
- Krux
- Souldrainer
- A Wish For A Maniac
- Bonnie Lee
- Crave
- Deals Death
- Disorge
- Doktor Diesel
- Dr. Living Dead
- Hellbound
- In Solitude
- Ki
- Miasmic Theory
- Pray For Locust
- Provoke Your Enemy
- Revolverdog
- Stoneload
- The Kristet Utseende
- The Whyrus

=== 2013 ===
- Aeon
- Always War
- Amorphis
- Anaal Nathrakh
- Assaultery
- Aura Noir
- Chaos in Order
- Corroded
- Daemonicus
- Entombed
- Extrakt
- Festering Remains
- Grand Nation
- Griftefrid
- Lahey
- Maiden Norway
- Mayhem
- Miseration
- Rage Invest
- Seventribe
- Sodom
- Structural Disorder
- Supernaut
- Tankard
- Vengha
- Zonaria
- Nifelheim
- Naglfar

=== 2014 ===
- Avatarium
- Axenstar
- Belphegor
- Besserbitch
- Bombus
- Civil War
- Cursed 13
- Dogface
- Enemy Within
- Enforcer
- F.K.Ü
- Hatebreed
- Hypocrisy
- Immaculate
- Man.Machine.Industry
- Monoscream
- Mörbultad
- Napalm Death
- Random Agnostic
- Raubtier
- Skull Fist
- The Sanity Decadence
- Thyrfing
- Vanderbuyst

=== 2015 ===
- At the gates
- The Haunted
- Port Noir
- Hardcore superstar
- Grand Magus
- Baptism
- Rotten Sound
- The Duskfall
- Watain
- Walking with strangers
- Finntroll
- Candlemass
- Binary Creed
- Vampire
- Deathbreed
- Rawhide
- Night
- Constructions
- Mesolimbic
- Revolver Dogs
- Midnight Caine
- Vanity BLVD
- Ufofolket
- Apocalypse Orchestra
- Helldorado

=== 2016 ===
- Battle Beast
- Raubtier
- Firespawn
- Cut Up
- Naglfar
- Satyricon
- Destruction
- Moloken
- Defiatory
- Raised Fist
- Holy Moses
- Vanity Insanity
- Achilles
- Oro
- Helvegen
- Hypertension
- Ensiferum
- Ramin Kuntopolku
- Skeleton Birth
- Forgetting The Memories
- Eterno
- Ebrietor
- In This Grey

=== 2017 ===
- Asphyx
- Krisiun
- Vintersorg
- Dark Tranquility
- Ereb Altor
- Anthrax
- Pain
- Gloryhammer
- Wolf
- The Raven Age
- Scar Symmetry
- Grave
- Purgatorium
- Grid
- Gluttony
- Mesolimbic
- Hyperion
- Nekrodelirium
- Tragederia
- A Lethal Smile

=== 2018 ===
- Meshuggah
- Nocturnal Rites
- Unleashed
- Danko Jones
- Sólstafir
- Thunderstone
- Hulkoff
- Dead Kosmonaut
- Asagraum
- Vanhelgd
- Dreadful Fate
- Utmarken
- 99Plajo
- Zornheym
- Freakin' Lizard
- Black Bay
- Incised
- Creeping Flesh
- Shiver
- Bleeding Utopia
- Enemy Inside

=== 2019 ===
- The Haunted
- Necrophobic
- Taake
- Malakhim
- Tiamat
- At the Gates
- Ross the Boss
- Clawfinger
- Attic
- Rotting Christ
- LIK
- Persuader
- Sadauk
- Devil's Force
- Cosmic Overlord
- Godhead Machinery
- 偏執症者 (Paranoid)
- Deathheim
- Awake the Dreamer
- Zephyra
- Helldorado
- Freak Out

=== 2020 ===
- Freak Kitchen
- Vomitory
- Burning Witches
- Darkened Nocturn Slaughtercult
- Onslaught
- Bewitched
- Shrapnel
- Nervosa
- Feral
- Doro
- I Am Morbid
- Marduk
- Berzerker Legion
- Carcass
- Black Bay
- Curse
- Dead Sleep
- Sanity Assassin
- Siberian
- Suffer Yourself
