= TKU =

TKU may refer to:

== Universities ==
- Tamkang University, a private university in New Taipei, Taiwan
- Tokyo Keizai University, a private university in Kokubunji, Tokyo, Japan
- The King's University (Texas), a private university in Southlake, Texas, United States
- The King's University (Edmonton), a Christian university in Edmonton, Alberta, Canada

== Other uses ==
- Three Kings United, the New Zealand football club
- TV Kumamoto, a television station in Kumamoto Prefecture, Japan
- The Kristet Utseende, a Swedish punk/ metal group
- IATA code for Turku Airport, Finland
