= Hell Train =

Hell Train may refer to:

- Hell Train, by Christopher Fowler
- Hell Train (film) 1985 French film
- Hell Train (album) by Soltero
- Helltrain, band

== See also ==
- Train to Hell, 1984 book by Alexei Sayle and David Stafford
