= Aeons Black =

Studio album by Aeon
- Released: 20 November 2012
- Recorded: June 2012
- Studio: Empire Studio (Östersund, Sweden)
- Genre: Death metal
- Label: Metal Blade
- Producer: Aeon; Ronnie Björnström

Aeon chronology
Path of Fire (2010)	Aeons Black (2012)	God Ends Here (2021)

Singles from Aeons Black
- 1. "Aeons Black"

Professional ratings
Review scores
Source	Rating
Allmusic	3.5/5 stars

Aeons Black is the fourth studio album by Swedish band Aeon, released on 20 November 2012. It is the only Aeon record featuring bassist Marcus Edvardsson, who left the band in March 2013, and drummer Arttu Malkki, who left the band due to family reasons, as well as the last album to feature rhythm guitarist Daniel Dlimi until his return in 2019.

== Background ==
Commented Aeon founding guitarist Zeb Nilsson: "This is definitely our most varied album to date; it has heavier songs, yet it also has lots of fast blastbeats and double bass drumming. It's groovier this time, which I think we lacked on our last album, 'Path Of Fire', which was fast-paced almost all the way through. That, and the amazing mix by Ronnie Björnström, makes me feel pretty confident that this album will appeal to more people than our previous albums. And no, we have not gone softer in any aspect; it's just easier to catch with all this grooviness. It's metal right up your ass!"

== Track listing ==
All lyrics are written by Tommy Dahlström, except "Sacrificed" and "Maze of the Damned" written by Zeb Nilsson

No.	Title	Music	Length
1.	"Still They Pray"	Nilsson	3:50
2.	"The Glowing Hate"	Daniel Dlimi	4:12
3.	"The Voice of the Accuser" (instrumental)	Nilsson	0:51
4.	"I Wish You Death"	Nilsson	4:54
5.	"Garden of Sin"	Nilsson	3:49
6.	"Neptune, the Mystic" (cover; instrumental)	Gustav Holst	1:12
7.	"Nothing Left to Destroy"	Dlimi	5:24
8.	"Passage to Hell" (instrumental)	Dlimi	1:05
9.	"Aeons Black"	Dlimi	3:42
10.	"Dead Means Dead"	Nilsson	4:03
11.	"Sacrificed"	Dlimi	3:23
12.	"Aftermath" (instrumental)	Dlimi	1:20
13.	"Blessed by the Priest"	Nilsson	3:58
14.	"Maze of the Damned"	Nilsson	3:38
15.	"Die by My Hands"	Nilsson	5:22
Total length:			50:43

== Personnel ==
Credits are adapted from the album's liner notes.

Aeon

- Tommy Dahlström – vocals
- Zeb Nilsson – lead guitar
- Daniel Dlimi – rhythm guitar
- Marcus Edvardsson – bass
- Arttu Malkki – drums

Production and design

- Aeon − production, arrangement
- Ronnie Björnström − production, engineering, mixing, mastering
- Daniel Dlimi − engineering
- Markus Edvardsson − engineering
- Kristian "Necrolord" Wåhlin − artwork
- Fredrik Wallin − photography
