= Dark Order =

EP by Aeon
- Released: 1 May 2001
- Recorded: Courthouse Studios in Östersund, Sweden; Summer 2000
- Genre: Death metal
- Length: 21:23
- Label: Necropolis Records
- Producer: Johan Hjelm

Aeon chronology
Demo #1 (1999)	Dark Order (2001)	Bleeding the False (2005)

Professional ratings
Review scores
Source	Rating
Kerrang!	4/5 stars

"Dark Order" is the first EP by the Swedish death metal band Aeon. It was released in May 2001.

== Track listing ==
All lyrics are written by Tommy Dahlström; all music is composed by Zeb Nilsson.

No.	Title	Length
1.	"The Return of Apolluon"	3:01
2.	"Eternal Hate"	3:05
3.	"With Blood They Pay"	4:13
4.	"The Awakening"	3:33
5.	"Bloodlust"	3:26
6.	"Hell Unleashed"	4:05
Total length:		21:23

== Personnel ==
Aeon

- Tommy Dahlström – vocals
- Zeb Nilsson – guitars
- Johan Hjelm – bass
- Arttu Malkki – drums

Production

- Johan Hjelm – production, engineering, mixing and mastering
- Recorded and mixed at Courthouse Studios in Östersund, Sweden; Summer 2000
- Jose Montemayor – cover artwork and layout
