= Bleeding the False =

Studio album by Aeon
- Released: 20 September 2005
- Recorded: October 2003 – February 2004; Courthouse Studio in Östersund, Sweden
- Genre: Death metal
- Length: 48:01
- Label: Unique Leader Records
- Producer: Johan Hjelm and Aeon

Aeon chronology
Dark Order (2001)	Bleeding the False (2005)	Rise to Dominate (2007)

Bleeding the False is the debut full-length album by the Swedish death metal band Aeon. It was released on 20 September 2005.

== Track listing ==
All lyrics are written by Tommy Dahlström.

No.	Title	Music	Length
1.	"Cenobites"	Dlimi	1:04
2.	"Soulburner"	Nilsson	4:13
3.	"Morbid Desire to Burn"	Dlimi	3:12
4.	"Biblewhore"	Nilsson	4:32
5.	"Forever Nailed"	Nilsson	4:13
6.	"Satanic Victory"	Dlimi, Nilsson	3:21
7.	"Enchanter"	Dlimi, Nilsson	1:32
8.	"Bleeding the False"	Nilsson	3:36
9.	"Doorknocker"	Hjelm	2:42
10.	"Bow Your Head"	Dlimi, Hjelm, Nilsson	4:47
11.	"I Hate Your Existence"	Dlimi	2:58
12.	"God Gives Head in Heaven"	Dlimi, Nilsson	3:48
13.	"Hell Unleashed"	Nilsson	3:55
14.	"Outro"	Aeon	0:50
15.	"God Gives Head in Heaven" (bonus acoustic version)	Aeon	3:18
Total length:			48:01

== Personnel ==
Aeon

- Tommy Dahlström – vocals
- Zeb Nilsson – lead guitar
- Daniel Dlimi – rhythm guitar
- Nils Fjellström – drums
- Johan Hjelm – bass

Production

- Dan Swanö – mixing and mastering at Unisound
- Production – Johan Hjelm and Aeon
- Recorded at Courthouse Studio in Östersund, Sweden; October 2003 – February 2004
- Engineering – Johan Hjelm assisted by Daniel Dlimi
- Mixing and mastering – Johan Hjelm; Courthouse Studio; 2004/2005
- Cover artwork, cover concept, layout, layout concept – Daniel Dlimi
