= Rise to Dominate =

Studio album by Aeon
- Released: September 4, 2007 (U.S.); September 7, 2007 (Germany, Austria, Switzerland, Italy); September 10, 2007 (Europe)
- Recorded: Empire Studio in Östersund, Sweden; April 2007
- Genre: Death metal
- Length: 45:15
- Label: Metal Blade Records
- Producer: Aeon and Marcus Edvardsson

Aeon chronology
Bleeding the False (2005)	Rise to Dominate (2007)	Path of Fire (2010)

Professional ratings
Review scores
Source	Rating
About.com	3.5/5 stars
AllMusic	3.5/5 stars
Blabbermouth	8.5/10 stars

Rise to Dominate is the second studio album by the Swedish band Aeon, released on September 4, 2007.

== Track listing ==
All lyrics are written by Dahlström, except for "Godless", written by Carlberg

No.	Title	Music	Length
1.	"Helel Ben-Shachar"	Dlimi	3:28
2.	"Spreading Their Disease"	Dlimi	3:39
3.	"Living Sin"	Nilsson	3:08
4.	"Hate Them"	Nilsson	2:44
5.	"You Pray to Nothing"	Nilsson	4:30
6.	"Caressed by the Holy Man"	Dlimi, Nilsson	3:58
7.	"House of Greed"	Dlimi	4:47
8.	"Godless"	Nilsson	2:49
9.	"When the War Comes"	Nilsson	4:08
10.	"There Will Be No Heaven for Me"	Nilsson	4:41
11.	"Luke 4:5-7"	Dlimi	3:49
12.	"No One Escapes Us"	Nilsson	3:19
Total length:			45:15

== Personnel ==
Aeon

- Tommy Dahlström – vocals
- Zeb Nilsson – lead guitar
- Daniel Dlimi – rhythm guitar
- Nils Fjellstrom – drums
- Max Carlberg – bass

Production

- Production – Aeon and Marcus Edvardsson
- Recorded at Empire Studio in Östersund, Sweden; April 2007
- Engineering – Marcus Edvardsson, Joakim Staaf and Aeon
- Mixing/mastering – Dan Swanö at Unisound; May 2007
- Cover artwork and layout – Daniel Dlimi
