= Path of Fire =

Studio album by Aeon
- Released: 21/24 May 2010 (Europe); 25 May 2010 (U.S.)
- Recorded: Empire Studio in Östersund, Sweden; September 2009
- Genre: Death metal
- Length: 41:48
- Label: Metal Blade Records
- Producer: Aeon

Aeon chronology
Rise to Dominate (2007)	Path of Fire (2010)	Aeons Black (2012)

Professional ratings
Review scores
Source	Rating
Allmusic	3.5/5 stars
Blabbermouth	8.5/10 stars
About.com	3.5/5 stars

Path of Fire is the third studio album by the Swedish band Aeon. It was released on 21/24 May in Europe and 25 May in the U.S. via Metal Blade Records.

== Background ==
As former bassist Max Carlberg had left Aeon at the time of the album recording and studio sessions had already been booked, preventing replacement bassist Victor Brandt from learning the songs in time, the bass on Path of Fire is handled by Aeon's guitarists Zeb Nilsson and Daniel Dlimi.

Guitarist and the graphic artist of Aeon, Daniel Dlimi, commented the cover art: "I created this symbol/badge that for me reflects life, death and the path you have chosen to live your life by. It's about whatever you want to chain yourself to 10 commandments or live free after your own conscience and will."

On 19 April Aeon posted "Kill Them All" for streaming online and Nilsson commented: "This is kind of funny, 'cause I actually dreamt that we were performing this song live and it sounded so cool that I had to start working on it the day after I had the dream. Of course, all the details in it were not in my dream, but the whole concept and idea behind how it was gonna sound was all very realistic. This is a very fast song and it is easy to catch I think. It has some really heavy parts too, and the leads on it ended up really cool too. I think this song will be a good first sample of this album!"

In June, Aeon released a music video for "Forgiveness Denied".

== Track listing ==
No.	Title	Lyrics	Music	Length
1.	"Forgiveness Denied"	Dahlström	Nilsson	4:07
2.	"Kill Them All"	Dahlström	Nilsson	3:13
3.	"Inheritance"	Fjellström	Nilsson	3:41
4.	"Abomination to God"	Dahlström	Dlimi	3:46
5.	"Total Kristus Inversus"	Instrumental	Dlimi, Nilsson	1:38
6.	"Of Fire"	Dahlström	Nilsson	4:06
7.	"I Will Burn"	Dahlström	Dlimi	3:15
8.	"Suffer the Soul"	Dahlström	Nilsson	3:36
9.	"The Sacrament"	Dahlström	Nilsson	4:23
10.	"Liar in the Name of God"	Dahlström	Nilsson	4:17
11.	"God of War"	Nilsson	Nilsson	5:56
Total length:				41:48

== Personnel ==
Aeon

- Tommy Dahlström – vocals
- Zeb Nilsson – lead guitar, backing vocals, bass
- Daniel Dlimi – rhythm guitar, bass
- Nils Fjellström – drums

Production

- Producer – Aeon
- Recorded at Empire Studio in Östersund, Sweden; September 2009
- Mixing – Erik Rutan; Mana Recording Studios in St, Petersburg, Florida
- Mastering – Alan Douches; West West Side Music in New Windsor, New York
- Cover artwork and layout – Daniel Dlimi
- Photo – Jennie Grinde
