= I Vow to Thee, My Country =

British patriotic song created in 1921

- Genre: Hymn
- Written: 1921
- Text: Cecil Spring Rice
- Meter: 13.13.13.13.13.13
- Melody: "Thaxted" by Gustav Holst; "Abinger" by Ralph Vaughan Williams

"I Vow to Thee, My Country" is a British patriotic hymn, created in 1921 when Gustav Holst set words written earlier by Cecil Spring Rice. The music originated as a wordless melody, which Holst later named "Thaxted", taken from the "Jupiter" movement of his own 1917 suite The Planets.

== History ==
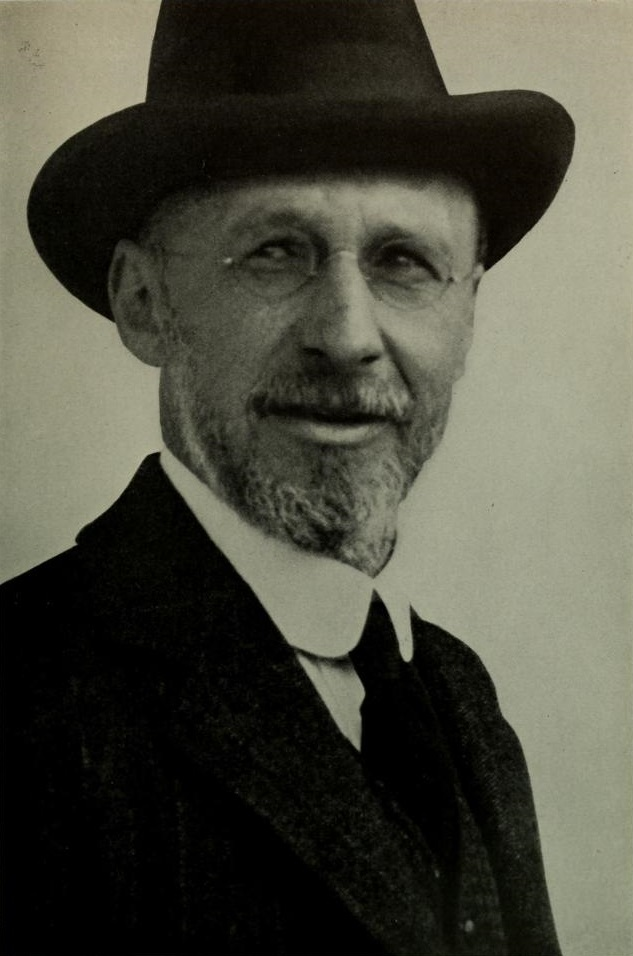
Sir Cecil Spring Rice

The origin of the hymn's text is a poem by diplomat Cecil Spring Rice, written in 1908 or 1912, titled "Urbs Dei" ("The City of God") or "The Two Fatherlands". The poem describes how a Christian owes his loyalties to his homeland and the heavenly kingdom.

In 1908, Spring Rice was posted to the British Embassy in Stockholm. In 1912, he was appointed as Ambassador to the United States, where he influenced the administration of Woodrow Wilson to abandon neutrality and join Britain in the war against Germany. After the United States entered the war, he was recalled to Britain. Shortly before he departed from the US in January 1918, he rewrote and renamed "Urbs Dei", significantly altering the first verse to concentrate on the themes of love and sacrifice rather than "the noise of battle" and "the thunder of her guns", creating a more sombre tone because of the loss of life suffered in the Great War. The first verse in both versions invokes Britain (in the 1912 version, anthropomorphised as Britannia with sword and shield; in the second version, simply called "my country"); the second verse, the Kingdom of Heaven.

According to Sir Cecil's granddaughter, the rewritten verse of 1918 was never intended to appear alongside the first verse of the original poem but was replacing it; the original first verse is nevertheless sometimes known as the "rarely sung middle verse". The text of the original poem was sent by Spring Rice to William Jennings Bryan in a letter shortly before his death in February 1918.

The poem circulated privately for a few years until it was set to music by Holst, to a tune he adapted from his Jupiter to fit the poem's words. It was first performed in 1921 at St Paul's Girls' School in London, where Holst taught at the time, and has since become the school's official hymn.

It was included in later hymnals, including:

Publication	Year	No.
Songs of praise: enlarged edition	1931	319
Methodist Hymn Book	1933	900
Songs of Praise for America	1938	43
The Book of Common Praise: being the hymn book of The Church of England in Canada	1939	805
Hymns Ancient & Modern, Revised	1950	579
Songs of Praise for Schools	1957	49
Church Hymnal, Fourth Edition	1960	312
Hymns Ancient & Modern, New Standard Edition	1983	295
Common Praise: A new edition of Hymns Ancient and Modern	2000	355
Church Hymnary (4th ed.)	2005	704

== Tune ==
The tune "Thaxted"
Gustav Holst's "Jupiter" theme from The Planets (Duration: 2 min 39 s)

Hymn version of Thaxted
Thaxted played on pipe organ (Duration: 1 min 34 s)

In 1921, Gustav Holst adapted the music from a section of Jupiter from his suite The Planets to create a setting for the poem. The music was extended slightly to fit the final two lines of the first verse. At the request of the publisher Curwen, Holst made a version as a unison song with orchestra (Curwen also published Sir Hubert Parry's unison song with orchestra, "Jerusalem"). This was probably first performed in 1921 and became a common element at Armistice memorial ceremonies, especially after it was published as a hymn in 1926.

In 1926, Holst harmonised the tune to make it usable as a hymn, which was included in the hymnal Songs of Praise. In that version, the lyrics were unchanged, but the tune was then called "Thaxted" (named after the village where Holst lived for many years). The editor of the new (1926) edition of Songs of Praise was Holst's close friend Ralph Vaughan Williams, which may have provided the stimulus for Holst's cooperation in producing the hymn. Vaughan Williams himself composed an alternative tune to the words, Abinger, which was included in the enlarged edition of Songs of Praise but is very rarely used.

Holst's daughter Imogen recorded that, at "the time when he was asked to set these words to music, Holst was so over-worked and over-weary that he felt relieved to discover they 'fitted' the tune from Jupiter".

== Lyrics ==
The hymn as printed in Songs of Praise (1925) consisted only of the two stanzas of the 1918 version, credited "Words: Cecil Spring-Rice, 1918; Music: Thaxted", as follows:

I vow to thee, my country, all earthly things above,
Entire and whole and perfect, the service of my love;
The love that asks no questions, the love that stands the test,
That lays upon the altar the dearest and the best;
The love that never falters, the love that pays the price,
The love that makes undaunted the final sacrifice.

And there's another country, I've heard of long ago,
Most dear to them that love her, most great to them that know;
We may not count her armies, we may not see her King;
Her fortress is a faithful heart, her pride is suffering;
And soul by soul and silently her shining bounds increase,
And her ways are ways of gentleness, and all her paths are peace.

The final line of the second stanza is based on Proverbs, "Her ways are ways of pleasantness, and all her paths are peace" (KJV), in the context of which the feminine pronoun refers to Wisdom.

The original first stanza of Spring-Rice's poem "Urbs Dei"/"The Two Father Lands" (1908–1912), never set to music, was as follows:

I heard my country calling, away across the sea,
Across the waste of waters, she calls and calls to me.
Her sword is girded at her side, her helmet on her head,
And around her feet are lying the dying and the dead;
I hear the noise of battle, the thunder of her guns;
I haste to thee, my mother, a son among thy sons.

== Contemporary use ==
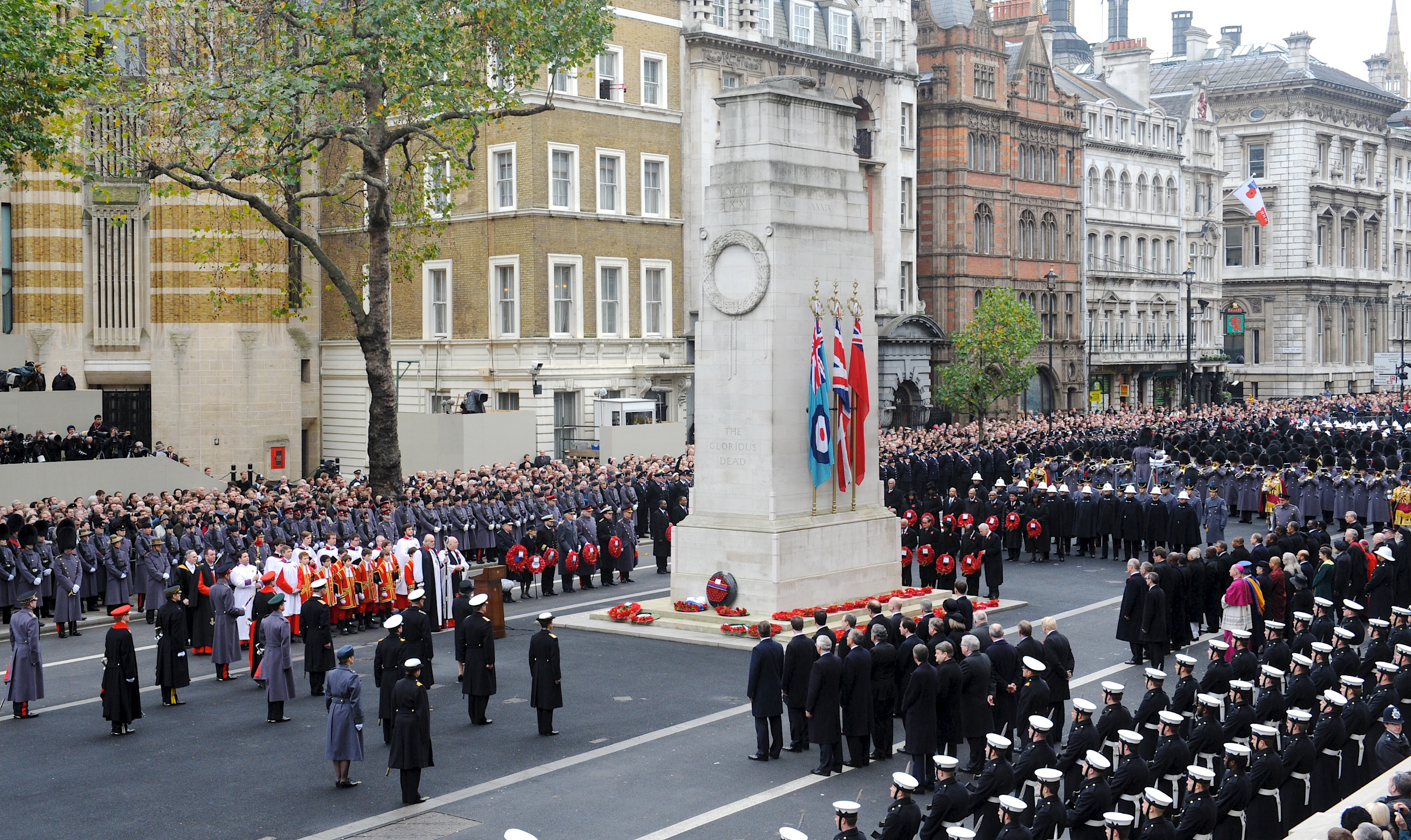
"I Vow to Thee, My Country" is popularly sung at Remembrance Day services

First performed in 1921, it is associated with Remembrance Day services all over the Commonwealth of Nations. The hymn was used at the funeral of Winston Churchill in 1965. Diana, Princess of Wales, requested that the hymn be sung at her wedding to Prince Charles in 1981, saying that it had "always been a favourite since schooldays". It was also sung at her funeral in 1997 and her tenth-year memorial service in 2007. It was sung at the funeral of Baroness Thatcher on 17 April 2013. Julian Mitchell's 1981 play Another Country and its 1984 film version derive their titles from the words of the second stanza.

The hymn was also used in the state funeral of Queen Elizabeth II on 19 September 2022, and for the funeral of Prince Phillip, Duke of Edinburgh on 9 April 2021.

== Reception ==
In 1988, Margaret Thatcher cited the hymn in the address popularly known as the Sermon on the Mound, building on it her theological argument for her vision of society.

In August 2004, Stephen Lowe, Bishop of Hulme criticised the hymn in a diocese newsletter, calling it "heretical" because of its nationalist overtones.

In November 2013, an Anglican vicar, Gordon Giles, said that the hymn could "give offence" because it references fighting for "a king as head of an empire, whose bounds need to be preserved for the benefit of subjects at home and abroad." Giles also said the song was still a cause of much pride for many military families who are "moved by doing so, and can become upset if they are prevented from singing it."

"I Vow to Thee, My Country" was voted as the UK's sixth favourite hymn in a 2019 poll by the BBC's Songs of Praise.
