= Aeon (band) =

Swedish death metal band

- Origin: Östersund, Sweden
- Genre: Death metal
- Years active: 1999−present
- Labels: Metal Blade, Unique Leader, Necropolis
- Members: Tommy Dahlström; Sebastian Nilsson; Daniel Dlimi; Tony Östman; Timo Häkkinen
- Past members: Johan Hjelm; Morgan Nordbakk; Nils Fjellström; Max Carlberg; Victor Brandt; Arttu Malkki; Marcus Edvardsson; Ronnie Björnström; Emil Wiksten
- Website: aeon.band

Aeon is a death metal band formed in Östersund, Sweden, in 1999. The band comprises vocalist Tommy Dahlström, guitarists Sebastian Nilsson and Daniel Dlimi, bassist Tony Östman, and drummer Timo Häkkinen. The band released its debut album, Bleeding the False, in 2005, and follow-up album Rise to Dominate in 2007, after signing a record deal with Metal Blade Records. The band's third album, Path of Fire, was released in 2010, and Aeons Black in 2012.

According to AllMusic, Aeon plays an "uncommonly intense, technically proficient, high-velocity brand of death metal".

== History ==
=== Formation and Bleeding the False (1999–2005) ===
Aeon was formed in the Swedish town of Östersund in 1999 by vocalist Tommy Dahlström, guitarists Sebastian Nilsson and Morgan Nordbakk, bassist Johan Hjelm, and drummer Arttu Malkki of the then-newly broken up band Defaced Creation, in order to play more modern death metal. They recorded a demo that year including the songs "Return of Apolluon", "Eternal Hate", "With Blood they Pay", "The Awakening", "Bloodlust" and "Hell Unleashed".

In 2001, Aeon released Dark Order EP, with the same track list as the demo, via Necropolis Records. That year, Nordbakk was replaced with Daniel Dlimi, who started to contribute as a songwriter. In 2002, after Malkki left the band, Nils Fjellström joined Aeon and they started to work on a studio album, which was recorded from October 2003 to February 2004 and released in September 2005 under the title Bleeding the False through Unique Leader record label.

=== Rise to Dominate and Path of Fire (2006–2011) ===
In April 2006, the band toured with Cannibal Corpse in Europe and signed a record deal with Metal Blade Records in July. Hjelm departed Aeon in mid-2006, but Max Carlberg filled his position in September. The second full-length album, Rise to Dominate, was recorded in April 2007 at Empire Studio, mixed and mastered by Dan Swanö at Unisound Studios and released in September 2007. Fjellström joined Dark Funeral on a tour in October 2007, but rejoined Aeon in February 2008.

During 2008, Aeon started to work on the next studio album. In January 2009, the band toured in Europe with Hate Eternal, Misery Index and See You Next Tuesday. In September, Carlberg departed and was replaced with Victor Brandt of Satyricon. The members said of Carlberg's departure, "Being on tour in a not-so-known death metal band like Aeon often means really tough conditions and bad economy. We totally understand that not everyone can put up with this way of life." The band recorded its third studio album, Path of Fire, at Empire Studio in Östersund, Sweden. Nilsson and Dlimi recorded the bass parts because Brandt did not have enough time to learn the songs. Erik Rutan mixed the album the following month at Mana Recording Studios in St, Petersburg, Florida. In January 2010, Brandt departed and was replaced with Marcus Edvardsson of Souldrainer and Sanctification.

Path of Fire was released on May 21/24 2010 in Europe and on May 25 in the U.S. via Metal Blade Records. In June, Aeon released a music video for "Forgiveness Denied." Dlimi commented on the theme of the song and video, "There have been a lot of scandals revealed lately, regarding priests (especially catholic ones) who have been abusing children sexually. In my world, there is nothing more innocent than a child, and the ones who abuse a child sexually will never be forgiven. In my opinion, they deserve to die a horrible, painful death. We want to dedicate this song/video to them, the filthy fucking priests who have laid a hand on a child sexually; we hate you, and want you dead."

In September 2010, Fjellström announced his departure from Aeon and Dark Funeral for personal reasons. The band started to seek a replacement. Malkki rejoined the band in November.

=== Aeons Black and God Ends Here (2012–present) ===
The band released Aeons Black in late 2012. In 2013, it was announced that drummer Malkki was expecting twins and decided to take a break from Aeon. Emil Wiksten temporarily filled his spot. As of January 28, 2013, Wiksten has replaced Malkki permanently. Later in 2013, it was announced that bassist Marcus Edvardsson had stepped down to focus on his other band, Souldrainer. His replacement is Tony Östman. In October 2013, Daniel Dlimi left the band. He was replaced with Ronnie Björnström, who had produced Aeons Black, in January 2014. Björnström, in turn, departed Aeon in March 2015, for health reasons. Dlimi returned to the band in September 2019. In late 2020, Dark Funeral drummer Janne Jaloma was announced as the session drummer who would perform on the band's then-upcoming album.

On August 17, 2021, the band announced their first album in nearly nine years, God Ends Here, released on October 15.

== Musical style and reception ==
Nilsson and Dlimi compose Aeon's music. Dahlström writes the lyrics. According to Allmusic, Aeon plays "uncommonly intense, technically proficient, high-velocity brand of death metal". Alex Webster of Cannibal Corpse stated, "Aeon's musicianship is among the best in death metal, but their songwriting is what truly sets them apart. It's rare to find a death metal band that is simultaneously crushingly brutal and infectiously catchy." Nilsson stated, "Tom [Dahlström] has had his problems with Jehovah's Witnesses who live[d] by him when he was a little younger. They actually were visiting him a lot, trying to convert him to Christian", which resulted in Aeon's anti-Christian lyrics.

Despite the band's Swedish nationality, Metal Hammer noted that the band's "brand of death metal just doesn’t sound that Swedish at all."

== Members ==
Current members

- Tommy Dahlström – lead vocals (1999–present)
- Sebastian "Zeb" Nilsson – lead guitar, backing vocals (1999–present), bass (2009–2010)
- Daniel Dlimi – rhythm guitar (2001–2013, 2019–present), bass (2009–2010)
- Tony Östman – bass (2013–present)

Session members

- Janne Jaloma – drums (2020–2021)

Former members

- Johan Hjelm – bass (1999–2006)
- Arttu Malkki – drums (1999–2002, 2010–2013)
- Morgan Nordbakk – rhythm guitar (1999–2001)
- Nils Fjellström – drums (2002–2010)
- Max Carlberg – bass (2006–2009)
- Victor Brandt – bass (2009–2010)
- Marcus Edvardsson – bass (2010–2013)
- Emil Wiksten – drums (2013–2016; live 2025)
- Ronnie Björnström – rhythm guitar (2013–2015)
- Timo Häkkinen – drums (2019–2020)

Timeline

== Discography ==
Studio albums

- Bleeding the False (2005)
- Rise to Dominate (2007)
- Path of Fire (2010)
- Aeons Black (2012)
- God Ends Here (2021)

EPs

- Dark Order (2001)
