= Thaxted (tune) =

English hymn tune by Gustav Holst

Song
- Written: 1921
- Published: 1925
- Genre: Hymn
- Composer: Gustav Holst

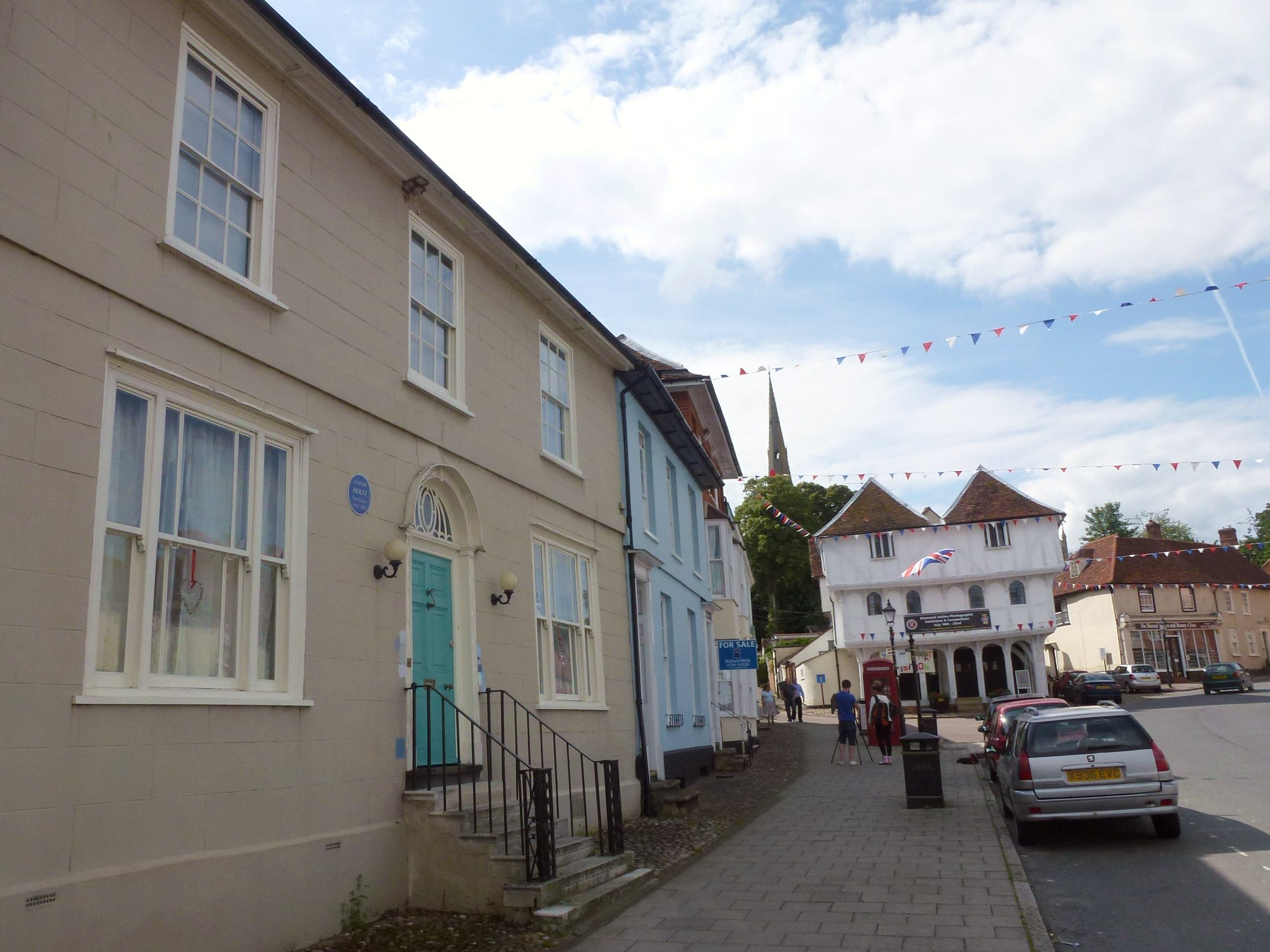
The Manse in Thaxted, where Gustav Holst lived from 1917 to 1925

"Thaxted" is a hymn tune by the English composer Gustav Holst, based on the stately theme from the middle section of the Jupiter movement of his orchestral suite The Planets and named after Thaxted, the English village where he lived much of his life. He adapted the theme in 1921 to fit the patriotic poem "I Vow to Thee, My Country" by Cecil Spring Rice but that was as a unison song with orchestra. It did not appear as a hymn-tune called "Thaxted" until his friend Ralph Vaughan Williams included it in Songs of Praise in 1925.

== Hymns written to the tune ==
Many Christian hymns have been written to the tune. Notable ones include:

The tune "Thaxted"
Thaxted, based on Gustav Holst's "Jupiter" theme from The Planets (Duration: 2 min 39 s)

Hymn version of "I vow to thee, my country"
Played on pipe organ by uploader, RD Wolff Duration: 1 min 34 s

- "I Vow to Thee, My Country" – Cecil Spring Rice, 1921.
- "O God Beyond All Praising" – Michael Perry, 1982.
- "The Iron Rod", performed by the Mormon Tabernacle Choir during the October 2005 General Conference of the Church of Jesus Christ of Latter-day Saints.
- "We Praise You and Acknowledge You, O God" – a paraphrase of the Te Deum Laudamus by Stephen P. Starke in the 2006 Lutheran Service Book
- "For the Splendor of Creation" – a hymn sung at Harvard University commencement ceremonies.
- "O Spirit All-Embracing" – Delores Dufner, 1995.

== Secular songs written to the tune ==
- "In the Quest for Understanding" – sesquicentennial anthem for Lawrence University in Appleton, Wisconsin
- "World in Union" – the anthem with lyrics by Charlie Skarbek, introduced at the 1991 Rugby World Cup
- The noise rock band Harvey Milk used Thaxted as a section in their song "The Anvil Will Fall".
- English folk trio Kerr Fagan Harbron used Thaxted as an introduction to the song "Leaving Old England".
- The Swedish extreme metal band Bathory used Thaxted as the basis for the song "Hammerheart" on the album Twilight of the Gods
- Japanese singer Ayaka Hirahara released the song "Jupiter", based on the melody, in December 2003.
- Sarah Brightman recorded the song "Running" in 2007. It was the theme song for the IAAF Championships.
- A choral adaptation of the tune for women's voices features prominently in the 2003 film Mona Lisa Smile.
- Maddy Prior includes the tune in two pieces of her 2003 album Lionhearts.

== Other uses of the melody ==
- The credits theme for the 2001 Sega video game Cyber Troopers Virtual-On Force.
- The Civilization V soundtrack as the theme of the English civilization.
- The South Korean television series Again My Life used the tune for its soundtrack.
- The children's show Bluey used the tune in a second season episode named "Sleepytime".
- The 1988 mini-series True Believers about the history of the Australian Labor Party uses the melody as its theme song.

A literary reference appears in "The Adventure of the Lost World", a Sherlock Holmes pastiche written by Dominic Green, where the tune is a major plot element, though the story contains a chronological error in that its Autumn 1918 setting would pre-date the publishing of the tune under the name "Thaxted".

== Uses at major events ==
The tune has been played at various major events:

=== In the United Kingdom ===
- The wedding of Prince Charles and Lady Diana Spencer in 1981.
- The funeral of Diana, Princess of Wales in 1997.
- The funeral of Margaret Thatcher in 2013.
- The funeral of Prince Philip, Duke of Edinburgh, in Windsor Castle on 17 April 2021.
- The funeral of Elizabeth II in 2022.
- The coronation of Charles III and Camilla in 2023.

=== In the United States ===
- The funeral service of US Senator John McCain at the Washington National Cathedral on 1 September 2018.
- The funeral Mass of Justice Antonin Scalia in the Basilica of the National Shrine of the Immaculate Conception.
