= The Kristet Utseende =

Swedish punk band

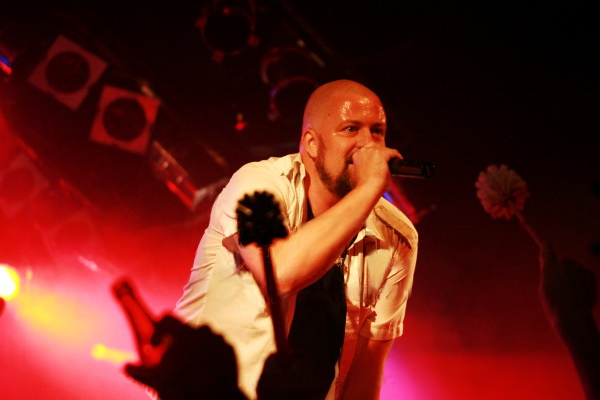
The Kristet Utseende performing in Malmö in 2008

The Kristet Utseende (The Christian Appearance) is a Swedish punk/metal-group with roots in parts around Gnarp between Sundsvall and Hudiksvall. The group themselves have said that their genre is "Narcotic Gay Metal".

The Kristet Utseendes music is inspired by bands such as Misfits, Metallica and Thomas Di Leva. Those influences began to show when they left their demo period and received a recording contract by the Swedish record company Eggtapes & records. On the old demo recordings there was an undistorted pop sound through and through. The lyrics deal with homosexuality, drug liberalism, Christianity and mysticism. The band managed to complete several tours and to release three full-length records and an EP-record before they split up after a final farewell gig on the Hultsfred Festival in 1999.

In 2005 the band reunited and performed on the Hultsfred Festival as well as on Augustibuller (literally: August noise), Piteå dansar och ler (literally: Piteå dances and smiles), Sundsvalls gatufest (literally: Sundsvall's street party), Arvika Festival and in Lund. This time there were no longer gigs in exchange for beer and distilled beverages; instead they had a well thought-out concept which they followed. This was because the band members had become more responsible individuals and that some of them had gotten their own families.

On 25 May 2006 The Kristet Utseende released their new album Sieg Hallelujah on the Black Lodge record company. The single Inferno Pervers landed in third place at the Swedish single charts.

== Members ==
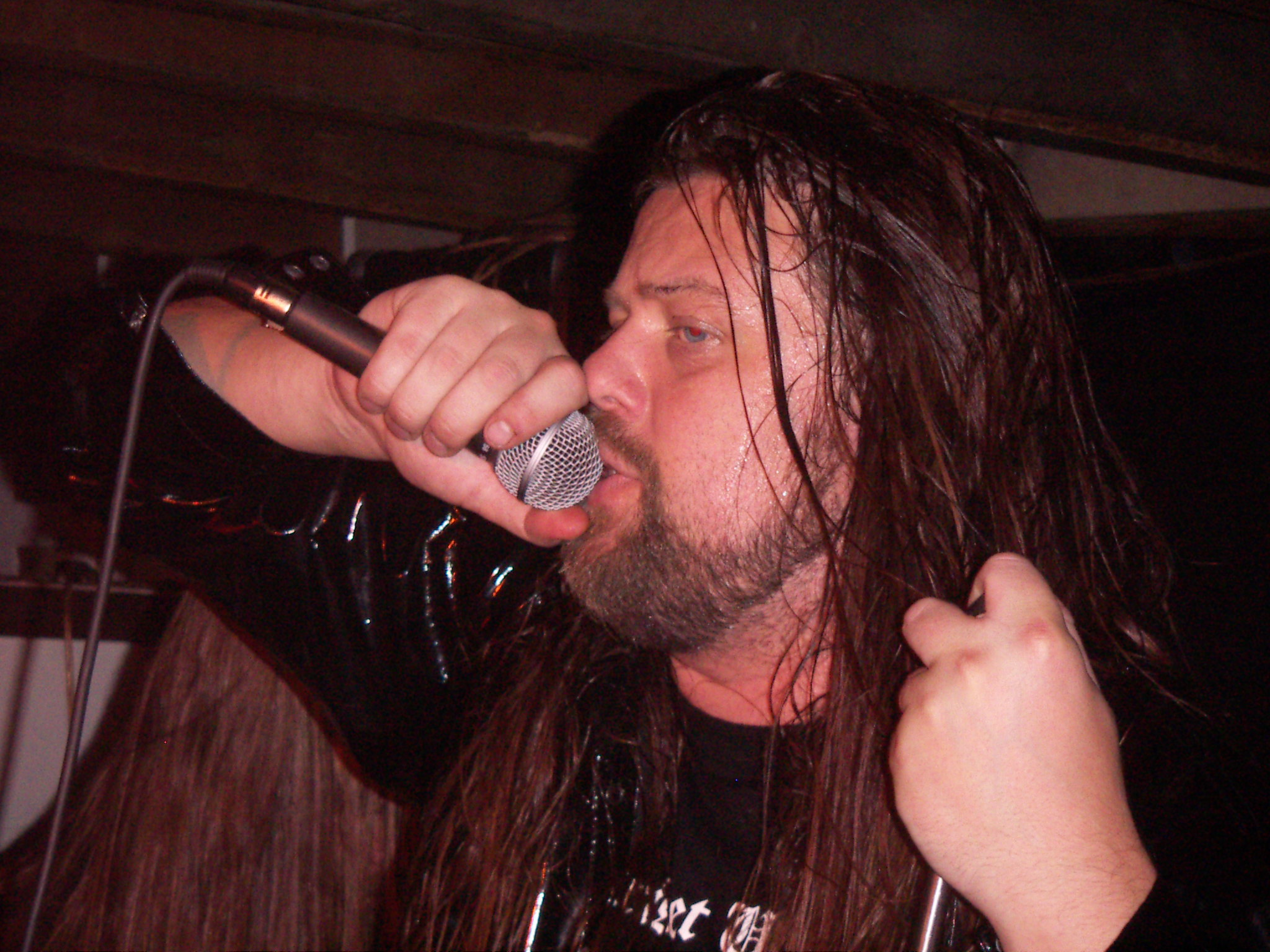
Jörgen Fahlberg

=== In the beginning ===
First line-up

- Jesper Forselius (drums)
- Mikael Höglund (bass)
- Jörgen Fahlberg (electric guitar / vocals)
- Michel Lansink (electric guitar)

Second line-up

- Peter Selin (drums)
- Janne Wiklund (bass)
- Jörgen Fahlberg (electric guitar / vocals)
- Michel Lansink (electric guitar)

=== After the reunion ===
- Jörgen Fahlberg (vocals)
- Janne Wiklund (electric guitar)
- Michel Lansink (electric guitar)
- Magnus Bergström (bass)
- Erik Barthold (drums)

== Discography ==
=== Albums ===
Year	Album	Literal translation	Peak positions
Year	Album	Literal translation	SWE
1994	Sug och fräls (Re-released in 1996)	Suck and redeem	–
1995	Transa i Transylvanien	Tranny in Transylvania	–
1996	Pang på pungen i Portugal	Slam on the scrotum in Portugal	43*
1998	Djävulsvingar över kapellet	Devil wings above the chapel	45*
2006	Sieg Hallelujah		18
2013	Frälsnigiös sextas: Psykosens gudomliga essens	"Salvational sexstasy": The divine essence of psychosis	28
2013	Pervogenesis		14

*Did not chart originally in its year of release. Charted in 2013 upon re-release.

Compilation albums

Year	Album	Literal translation	Peak positions
Year	Album	Literal translation	SWE
2002	Över dimmornas bro till Ankara	Over the bridge of mists to Ankara	–

=== Mini CDs ===
- 2006: Under kemiska änglars vingar (literally: Under the wings of chemical angels)

=== Live DVDs ===
- 2007: Frälsningsprocessens andliga Inferno (literally: The spiritual inferno of the salvation process)

=== Singles ===
Year	Album	Peak positions	Album
Year	Album	SWE	Album
2006	"Inferno Pervers"	3	
2007	"Dragon City Skaters"	4	

== Side projects ==
- Praetorian Platoon
- Sohr
- Left Hand Solution
- Mondo Gnarp
- Raptor
- Aftermath
- BLOD
