= Helltrain =

Swedish death 'n' roll band

- Origin: Luleå, Sweden
- Genres: Death 'n' roll; melodic death metal
- Years active: 2002–present
- Labels: Nuclear Blast; Jimmy Franks Recording Company; Universal Music Group
- Members: Pierre Törnkvist; Patrik Törnkvist; Mikael Sandorf; Fredrik Andersson; Markus Parkkila
- Past members: Oskar Karlsson; Mats Järnil

Helltrain is a Swedish death 'n' roll band formed in Luleå in 2002 by Pierre Törnkvist, Oscar Karlsson and Patrik Törnkvist. The current line-up consists of Pierre Törnkvist (vocals), Patrik Törnkvist (guitars, keyboards), Mikael Sandorf (guitars), Markus Parkkila (bass) and Fredrik Andersson (drums). Sandorf and Mats joined Helltrain after their original band, The Duskfall, disbanded in 2008. Helltrain has released one EP (The 666 EP) and three studio albums (Route 666, Rock n' Roll Devil, and Death Is Coming). Two singles ("Wolfnight" and "On Your Knees") were released in 2018. The single "Mischief" was released in 2023.

== History ==
In 2002, Helltrain recorded the songs "Route 666", "Rot n' roll" and Helltrain" for a demo that they sent to record label Nuclear Blast. Swedish underground label Heathendoom Music later released the demo as The 666 EP, limited to 500 copies.

The Jimmy Franks Recording Company/Universal Records released the Route 666 album (previously released in Europe in 2004) in the United States in late 2006. In 2007, the band quit Nuclear Blast and signed to Jimmy Franks Recording Company.

Helltrain's second album, Rock n' Roll Devil, was released on 9 September 2008.

Swedish TPL Records released Helltrain's third album, Death Is Coming, in May 2012. Metalism Records released a version for Russia/Ukraine/Baltic states. German DarkZone Music released a limited vinyl LP version.

Drummer Oscar Karlsson died in March 2016. After his death, the band returned with two singles in 2018, and made a live appearance headlining a festival in their Luleå hometown. Video footage of the song "Wolfnight" from this show is available on YouTube.

In May 2023, the band released the single "Mischief".

== Members ==
- Pierre Törnkvist – bass (2002–2009) guitar (2002–2003) vocals (2002–present)
- Patrik Törnkvist – bass (2002–2003) guitar, organ, piano (2002–present)
- Mikael Sandorf – guitars (2009–present)
- Fredrik Andersson – drums (2018–present)
- Markus Parkkila – bass (2018–present)

=== Former members ===
- Oskar Karlsson – drums (2002–2016) bass (2002–2003)
- Mats Järnil – bass (2009–2018)

== Discography ==
- The 666 EP (2003/2009)
- Route 666 (2004)
- Rock n' Roll Devil (2008)
- Death Is Сoming (2012)
- "Wolfnight" (2018 – single)
- "On Your Knees" (2018 – single)
- "Alive" (2021 – EP)
- "Mischief" (2023 – single)
