= Souldrainer =

Swedish death metal band

Souldrainer is a Swedish melodic death metal band.

Members of Souldrainer also appeared in other bands including Sanctification.

== Discography ==
- Reborn (2007)
- Heaven's Gate (2011)
- Architect (2014)
- Departure (2022)
