= The Planets =

Orchestral suite by Gustav Holst

- Orchestral suite by Gustav Holst
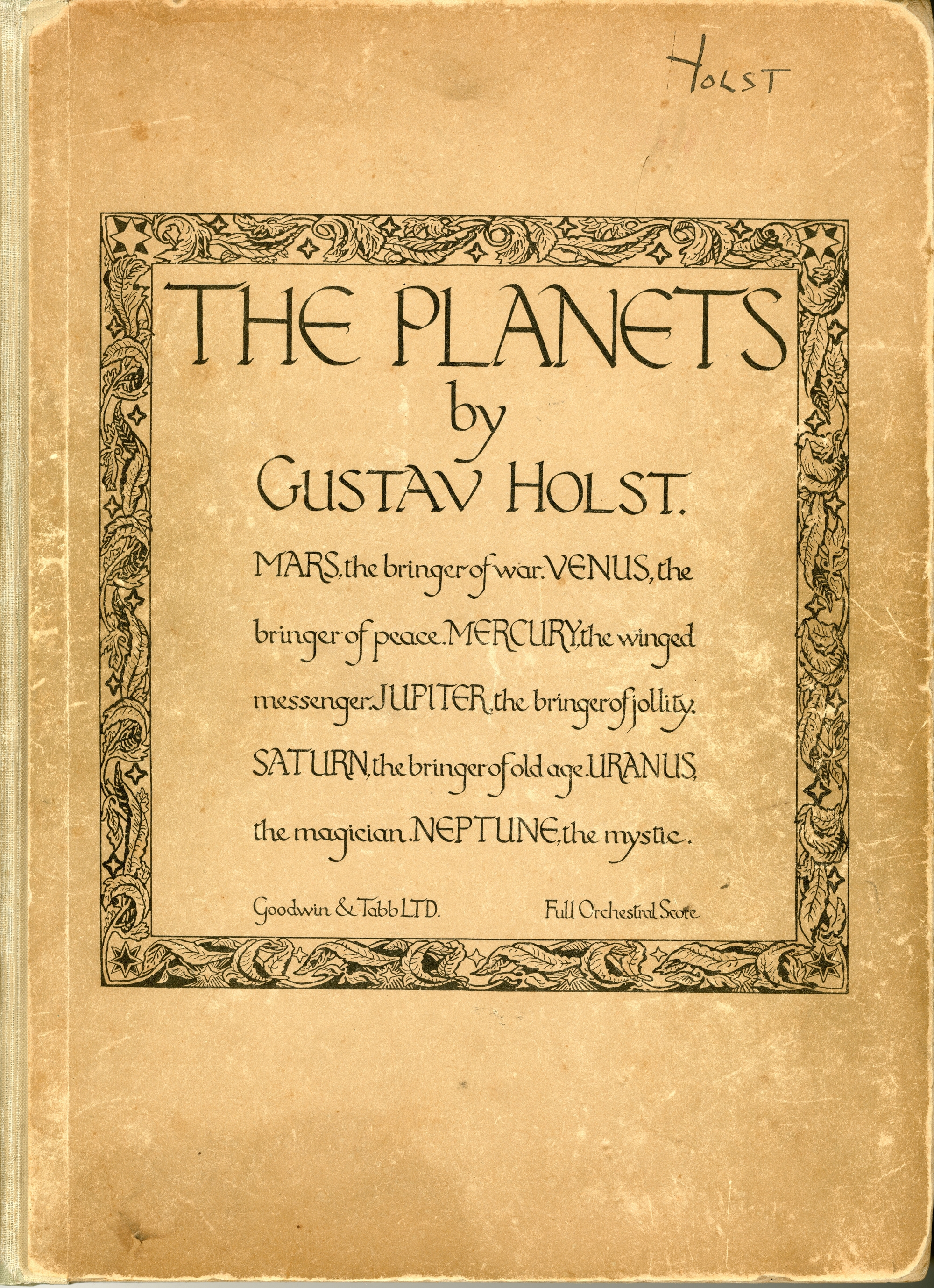
- Holst's copy of the first edition
- Opus: 32
- Based on: Astrology
- Composed: 1914–17
- Movements: Seven
- Scoring: Orchestra and female chorus

Premiere
- Date: 29 September 1918
- Location: Queen's Hall, London
- Conductor: Adrian Boult

The Planets, Op. 32, is a seven-movement orchestral suite by the English composer Gustav Holst, written between 1914 and 1917. In the last movement the orchestra is joined by a wordless female chorus. Each movement of the suite is named after a planet of the Solar System and reflects its astrological significance.

The premiere of The Planets was at the Queen's Hall, London, on 29 September 1918, conducted by Holst's friend Adrian Boult before an invited audience of about 250 people. Three concerts at which movements from the suite were played were given in 1919 and early 1920. The first complete performance at a public concert was given at the Queen's Hall on 15 November 1920 by the London Symphony Orchestra conducted by Albert Coates.

The innovative nature of Holst's music caused some initial hostility among a minority of critics, but the suite quickly became and has remained popular, influential and widely performed. The composer conducted two recordings of the work, and it has been recorded at least 80 times subsequently by conductors, choirs and orchestras from the UK and internationally.

== Background and composition ==
Holst c. 1921

The Planets was composed over nearly three years, between 1914 and 1917. The work had its origins in March and April 1913, when Gustav Holst and his friend and benefactor H. Balfour Gardiner holidayed in Spain with the composer Arnold Bax and his brother, the author Clifford Bax. A discussion about astrology piqued Holst's interest in the subject. Clifford later commented that Holst became "a remarkably skilled interpreter of horoscopes". Shortly after the holiday Holst wrote to a friend: "I only study things that suggest music to me. That's why I worried at Sanskrit. (Note: Holst's earlier interest in Sanskrit texts, particularly the Rig Veda hymns, had led him to study the language and to compose several works based on Sanskrit texts.) Then recently the character of each planet suggested lots to me, and I have been studying astrology fairly closely". He told Clifford in 1926 that The Planets:

... whether it’s good or bad, grew in my mind slowly—like a baby in a woman's womb ... For two years I had the intention of composing that cycle, and during those two years it seemed of itself more and more definitely to be taking form.

Imogen Holst, the composer's daughter, wrote that her father had difficulty with large-scale orchestral structures such as symphonies, and the idea of a suite with a separate character for each movement was an inspiration to him. Holst's biographer Michael Short and the musicologist Richard Greene both think it likely that another inspiration for the composer to write a suite for large orchestra was the example of Arnold Schoenberg's Five Pieces for Orchestra – in fact, Holst's original title for his suite was "Seven Pieces for Large Orchestra". That suite had been performed in London in 1912 and again in 1914; Holst was at one of the performances, and he is known to have owned a copy of the score.

Holst described The Planets as "a series of mood pictures", acting as "foils to one another", with "very little contrast in any one of them". Short writes that some of the characteristics the composer attributed to the planets may have been suggested by Alan Leo's booklet What Is a Horoscope?, which he was reading at the time. Holst took the title of two movements – "Mercury, the Winged Messenger" and "Neptune, the Mystic" – from Leo's books. But although astrology was Holst's starting point, he arranged the planets to suit his own plan:

... ignoring some important astrological factors such as the influence of the sun and the moon, and attributing certain non-astrological qualities to each planet. Nor is the order of movements the same as that of the planets' orbits round the sun; his only criterion being that of maximum musical effectiveness.

In an early sketch for the suite Holst listed Mercury as "no. 1", which Greene suggests raises the possibility that the composer's first idea was simply to depict the planets in the obvious order, from nearest the sun to the farthest. "However, opening with the more disturbing character of Mars allows a more dramatic and compelling working out of the musical material". Holst described his composition to a reporter:

The pieces were suggested by the astrological significance of the Planets; there is no programme music in them, neither have they any connection with the deities of classical mythology bearing the same names. If any guide to the music is required the sub-title of each piece will be found sufficient, especially if it be used in a broad sense. For instance, Jupiter brings jollity in the ordinary sense, and also the more ceremonial kind of rejoicing associated with religious or national festivities. Saturn brings not only physical decay, but also a vision of fulfilment. Mercury is the symbol of mind.

Holst had a heavy workload as head of music at St Paul's Girls' School in Hammersmith and director of music at Morley College, and had limited time for composing. Imogen Holst wrote, "Weekends and holidays were the only times when he could really get on with his own work, which is why it took him over two years to finish The Planets". She added that Holst's chronic neuritis in his right arm was troubling him considerably and he would have found it impossible to complete the 198 pages of the large full score without the help of two colleagues at St Paul's, Vally Lasker and Nora Day, whom he called his "scribes".

The first movement to be written was Mars in mid-1914, followed by Venus and Jupiter in the latter part of the year, Saturn and Uranus in mid-1915, Neptune later in 1915 and Mercury in early 1916. Holst completed the orchestration during 1917.

== First performances ==
Just before the Armistice, Gustav Holst burst into my office: "Adrian, the YMCA are sending me to Salonika quite soon and Balfour Gardiner, bless his heart, has given me a parting present consisting of the Queen's Hall, full of the Queen's Hall Orchestra for the whole of a Sunday morning. So we're going to do The Planets, and you've got to conduct."

— Adrian Boult

The premiere of The Planets, conducted at Holst's request by Adrian Boult, was held at short notice on 29 September 1918, during the last weeks of the First World War, in the Queen's Hall with the financial support of Gardiner. It was hastily rehearsed; the musicians of the Queen's Hall Orchestra first saw the complicated music only two hours before the performance, and the choir for Neptune was recruited from Holst's students at Morley College and St Paul's Girls' School. It was a comparatively intimate affair, attended by around 250 invited associates, but Holst regarded it as the public premiere, inscribing Boult's copy of the score, "This copy is the property of Adrian Boult who first caused the Planets to shine in public and thereby earned the gratitude of Gustav Holst."

Adrian Boult, "who first caused the Planets to shine in public"

At a Royal Philharmonic Society concert at the Queen's Hall on 27 February 1919 conducted by Boult, five of the seven movements were played in the order Mars, Mercury, Saturn, Uranus, and Jupiter. It was Boult's decision not to play all seven movements at this concert. Although Holst would have liked the suite to be played complete, Boult's view was that when the public were being presented with a completely new language of this kind, "half an hour of it was as much as they could take in". Imogen Holst recalled that her father "hated incomplete performances of The Planets, though on several occasions he had to agree to conduct three or four movements at Queen's Hall concerts. He particularly disliked having to finish with Jupiter, to make a 'happy ending', for, as he himself said, 'in the real work the end is not happy at all'".

At a Queen's Hall concert on 22 November 1919, Holst conducted Venus, Mercury and Jupiter. (Note: This was the first public performance of Venus.) There was another incomplete public performance, in Birmingham, on 10 October 1920, with five movements (Mars, Venus, Mercury, Saturn and Jupiter), conducted by the composer. The first complete performance of the suite at a public concert was on 15 November 1920; the London Symphony Orchestra was conducted by Albert Coates. (Note: This was the first time Neptune was heard in a public performance.) The first complete performance conducted by the composer was on 13 October 1923, with the Queen's Hall Orchestra.

== Instrumentation ==
The work is scored for a large orchestra. Holst's fellow composer Ralph Vaughan Williams wrote in 1920, "Holst uses a very large orchestra in the Planets not to make his score look impressive, but because he needs the extra tone colour and knows how to use it". The score calls for the following instrumentation. The movements vary in the combinations of instruments used.

- Woodwinds: four flutes (third doubling first piccolo and fourth doubling second piccolo and "bass flute in G", actually an alto flute), three oboes (third doubling bass oboe), one cor anglais, three clarinets in B♭ and A, one bass clarinet in B♭, three bassoons, one contrabassoon
- Brass: six horns in F, four trumpets in C, two trombones, one bass trombone, one tenor tuba in B♭ (often played on a euphonium), one tuba
- Percussion: six timpani (two players); triangle, snare drum, tambourine, cymbals, bass drum, tam-tam, tubular bells, glockenspiel, xylophone
- Keyboards: organ, celesta
- Strings: two harps, violins i, ii, violas, cellos, double basses (Low C appears in the score)

In Neptune, two three-part women's choruses (each comprising two soprano sections and one alto section) located in an adjoining room which is to be screened from the audience are added.

Source: Published score.

== Structure ==
=== I. Mars, the Bringer of War ===
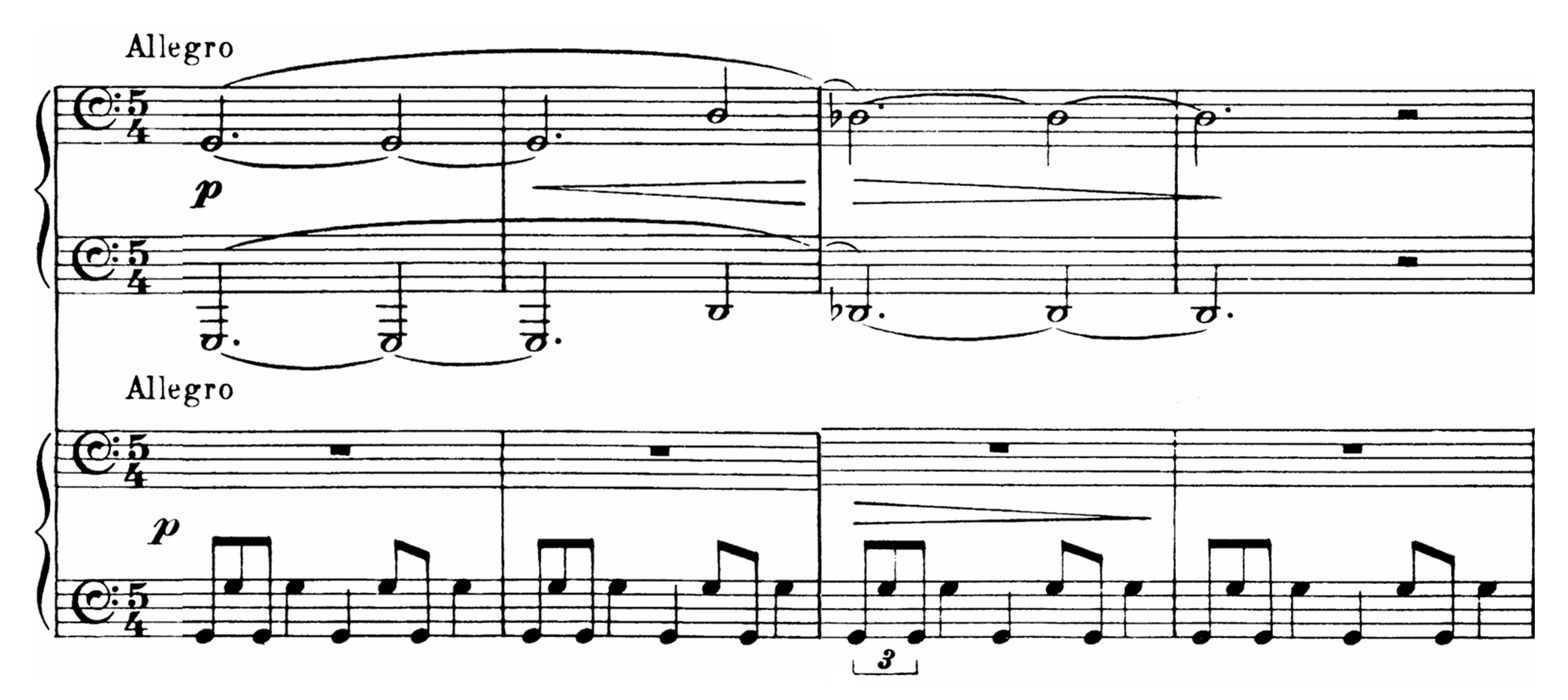
Opening bars

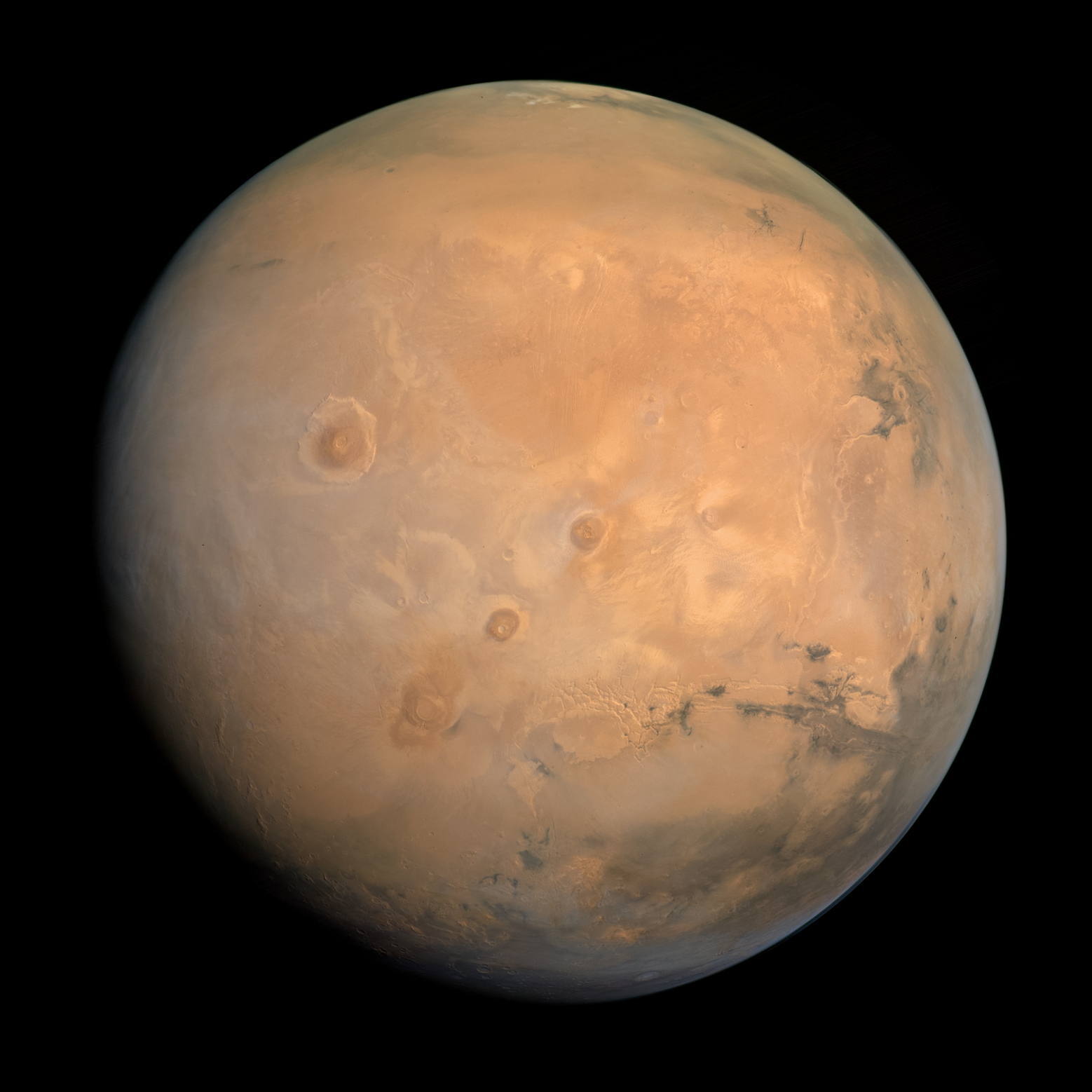
The planet

Its astrological symbol

Mars is marked allegro and is in a relentless 5/4 ostinato for most of its duration. It opens quietly, the first two bars played by percussion, harp and col legno strings. The music builds to a quadruple-forte, dissonant climax. Although Mars is often thought to portray the horrors of mechanised warfare, it was completed before the First World War started. The composer Colin Matthews writes that for Holst, Mars would have been "an experiment in rhythm and clashing keys", and its violence in performance "may have surprised him as much as it galvanised its first audiences". Short comments, "harmonic dissonances abound, often resulting from clashes between moving chords and static pedal-points", which he compares to a similar effect at the end of Igor Stravinsky's The Firebird, and adds that "although battle music had been written before, notably by Richard Strauss in Ein Heldenleben, it had never expressed such violence and sheer terror".

=== II. Venus, the Bringer of Peace ===
Opening bars

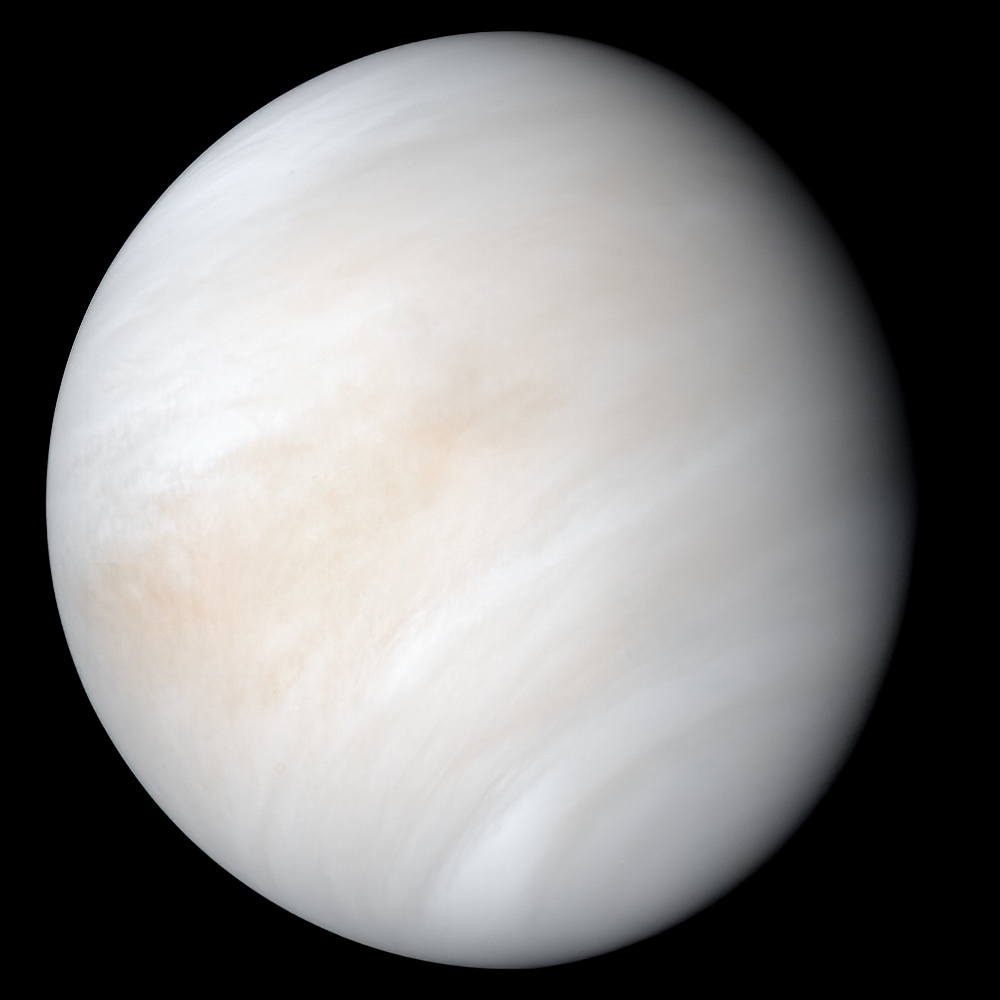

The second movement begins adagio in 4/4. According to Imogen Holst, Venus "has to try and bring the right answer to Mars". The movement opens with a solo horn theme answered quietly by the flutes and oboes. A second theme is given to solo violin. The music proceeds tranquilly with oscillating chords from flutes and harps, with decoration from the celesta. Between the opening adagio and the central largo there is a flowing andante section in 3/4 with a violin melody (solo then tutti) accompanied by gentle syncopation in the woodwind. The oboe solo in the central largo is one of the last romantic melodies Holst allowed himself before turning to a more austere manner in later works. Leo called the planet "the most fortunate star under which to be born"; Short calls Holst's Venus "one of the most sublime evocations of peace in music".

=== III. Mercury, the Winged Messenger ===
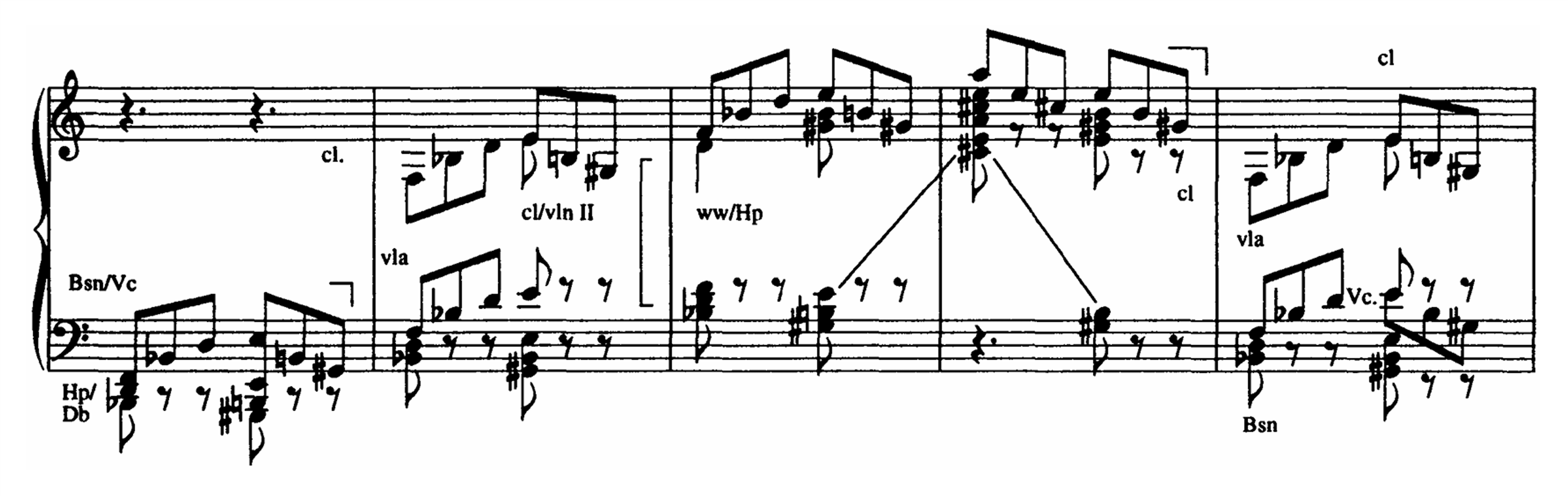
Opening bars

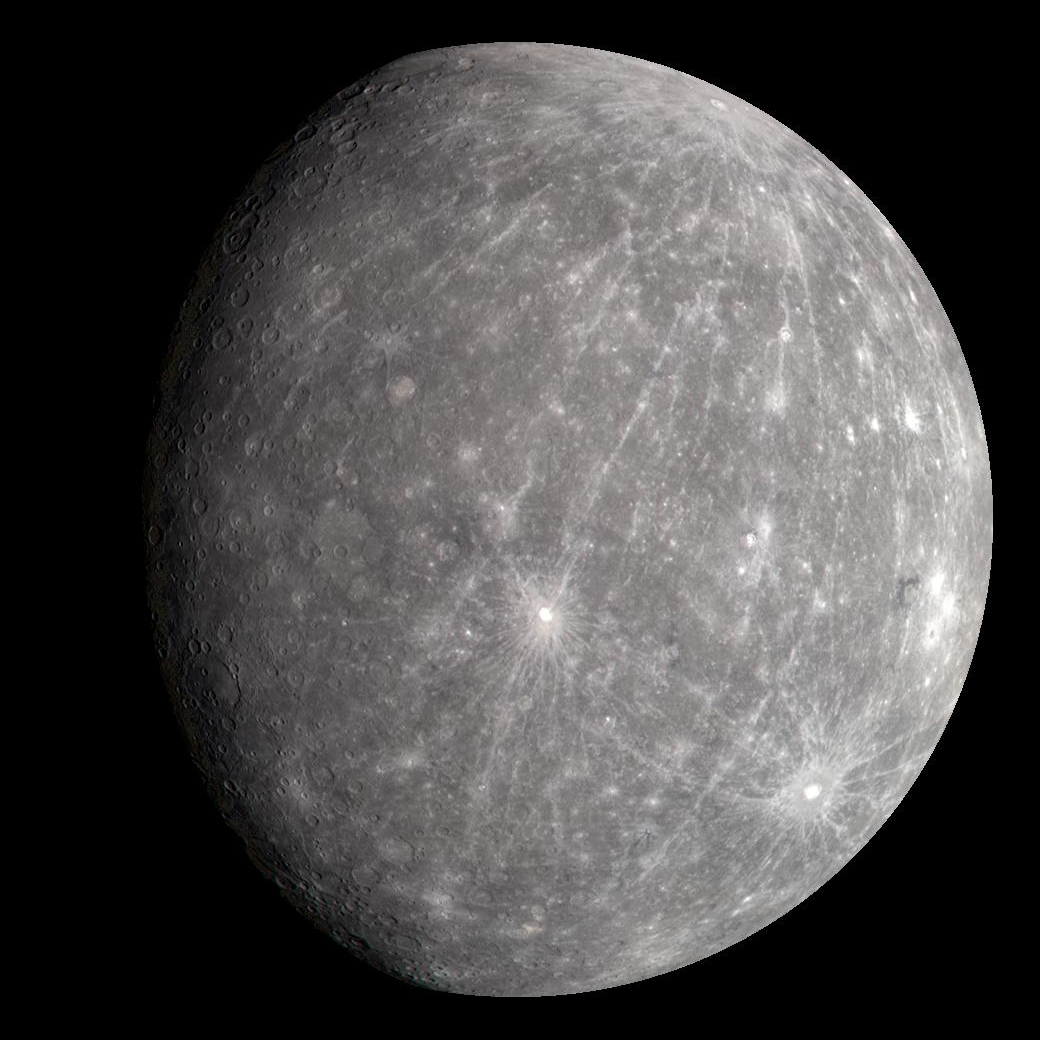

Mercury is in 6/8 and is marked vivace throughout. The composer R. O. Morris thought it the nearest of the movements to "the domain of programme music pure and simple ... it is essentially pictorial in idea. Mercury is a mere activity whose character is not defined". This movement, the last of the seven to be written, contains Holst's first experiments with bitonality. He juxtaposes melodic fragments in B♭ major and E major, in a fast-moving scherzo. Solo violin, high-pitched harp, flute and glockenspiel are prominently featured. It is the shortest of the seven movements, typically taking between 3 1/2 and 4 minutes in performance.

=== IV. Jupiter, the Bringer of Jollity ===
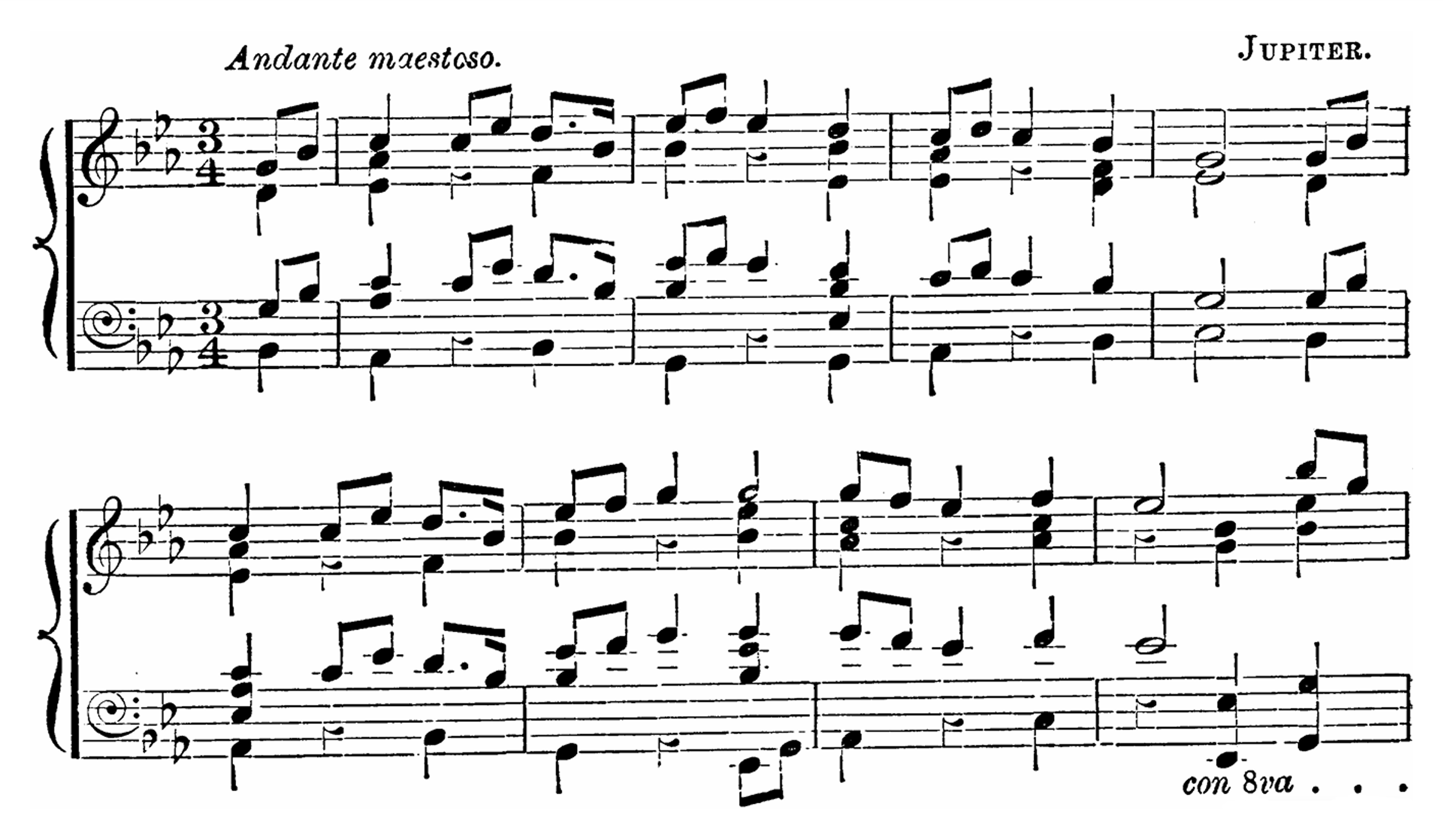
Middle section theme

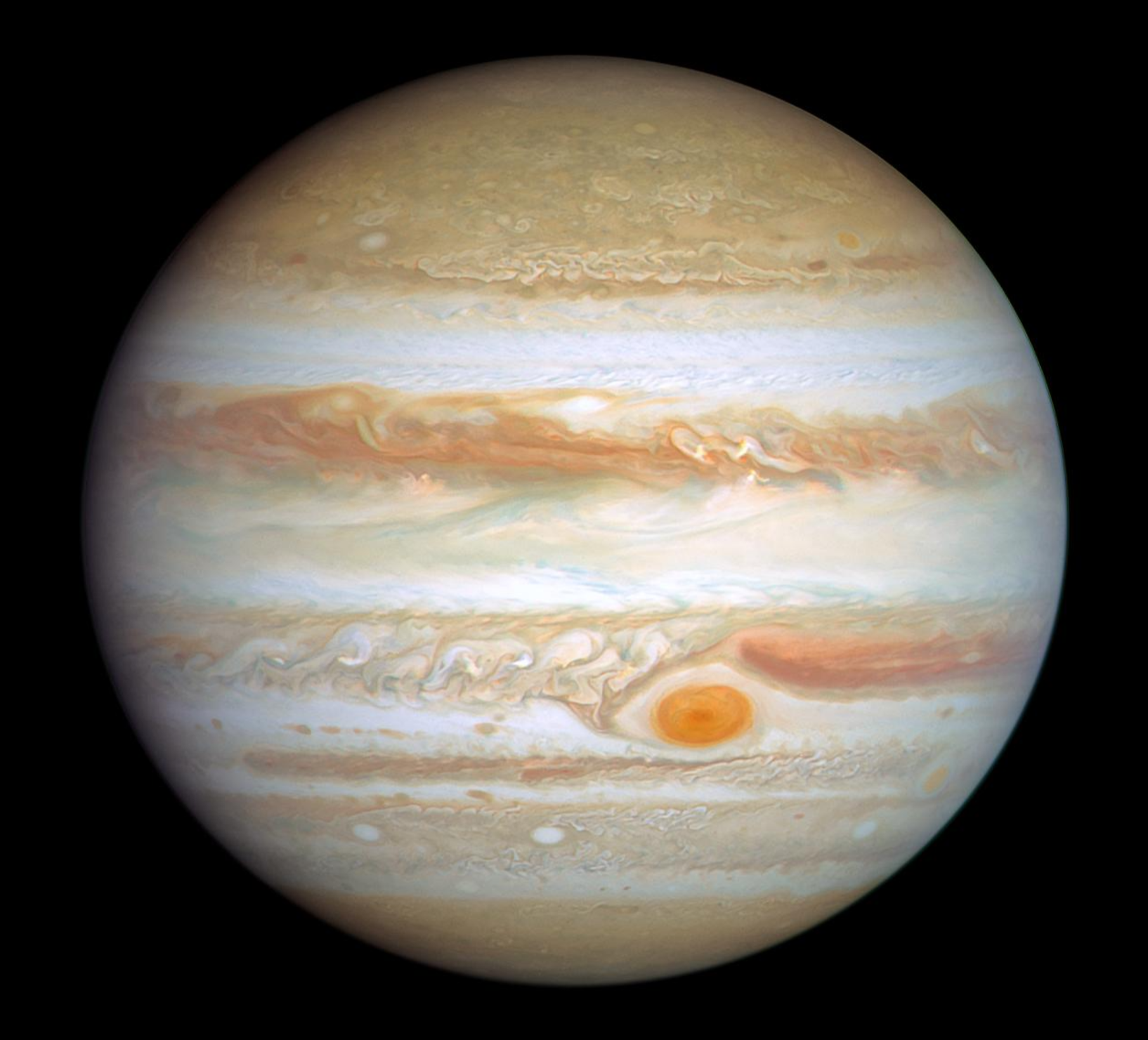

In this movement Holst portrays Jupiter's supposedly characteristic "abundance of life and vitality" with music that is buoyant and exuberant. Nobility and generosity are allegedly characteristics of those born under Jupiter, and in the slower middle section Holst provides a broad tune embodying those traits. In the view of Imogen Holst, it has been compromised by its later use as the melody for a solemn patriotic hymn, "I Vow to Thee, My Country"; (Note: In 1986 Imogen Holst wrote that "[f]or more than half a century, the main problem in Jupiter has been the difficulty of avoiding unwanted associations with the hymn". Holst's closest friend, Ralph Vaughan Williams, was, inadvertently, partly to blame for the use of the tune as a solemn hymn. He had suggested that Cecil Spring-Rice's verse should be set to music, and Holst was asked to undertake the job. Being overworked and exhausted at the time, Holst, spotting that the words fitted the maestoso tune from Jupiter, repurposed that rather than write a new one.) the musicologist Lewis Foreman comments that the composer did not think of it in those terms, as shown by his own recordings of the movement. The opening section of the movement is marked allegro giocoso, in 2/4 time. The second theme, at the same tempo, is in 3/4 time, as is the broad melody of the middle section, marked andante maestoso, which Holst marks to be taken at half the speed of the opening section. The opening section returns and after a reappearance of the maestoso tune – its expected final cadence unresolved, as in its first appearance – the movement ends with a triple forte quaver chord for the full orchestra.

=== V. Saturn, the Bringer of Old Age ===
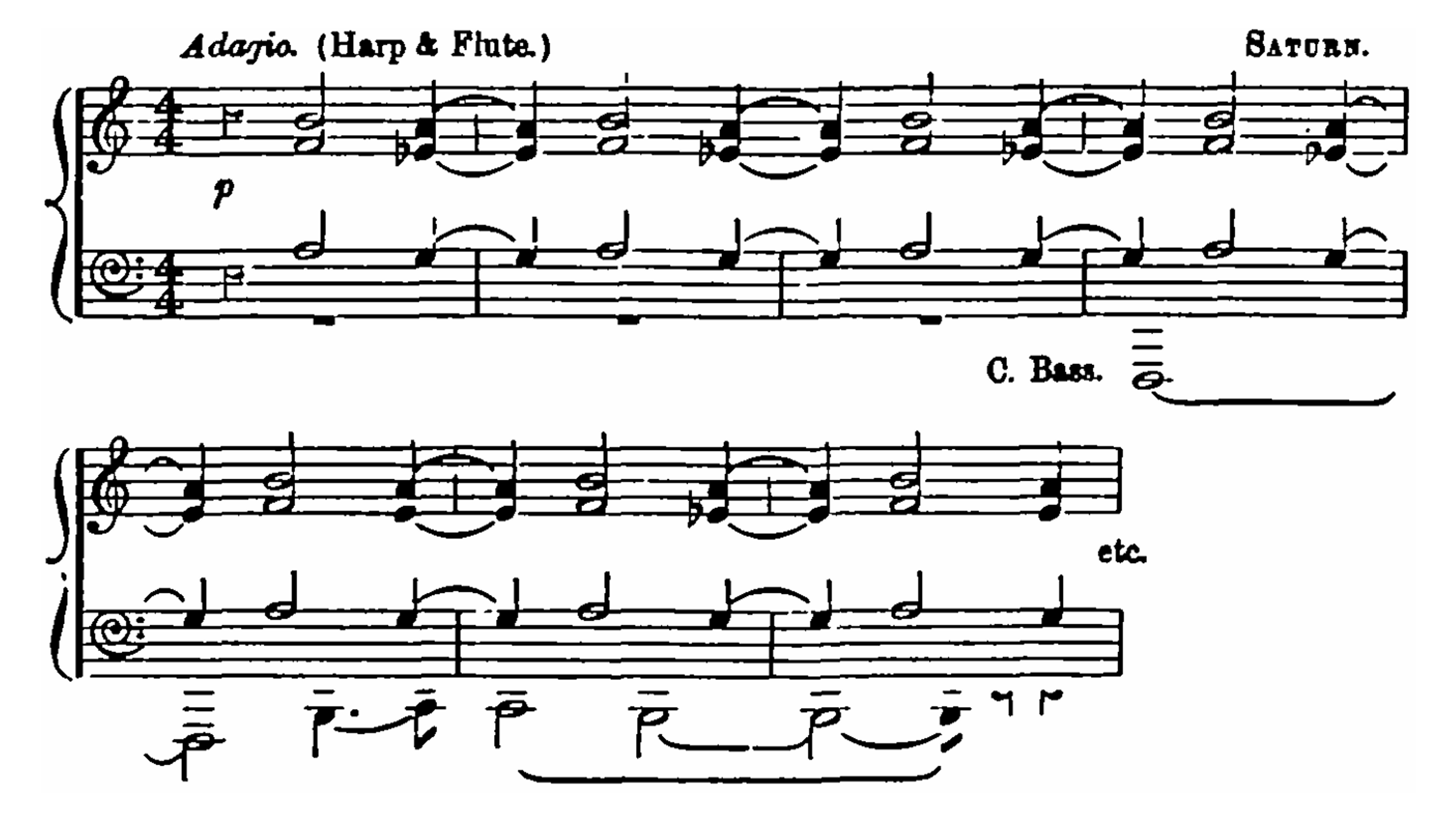
Opening bars

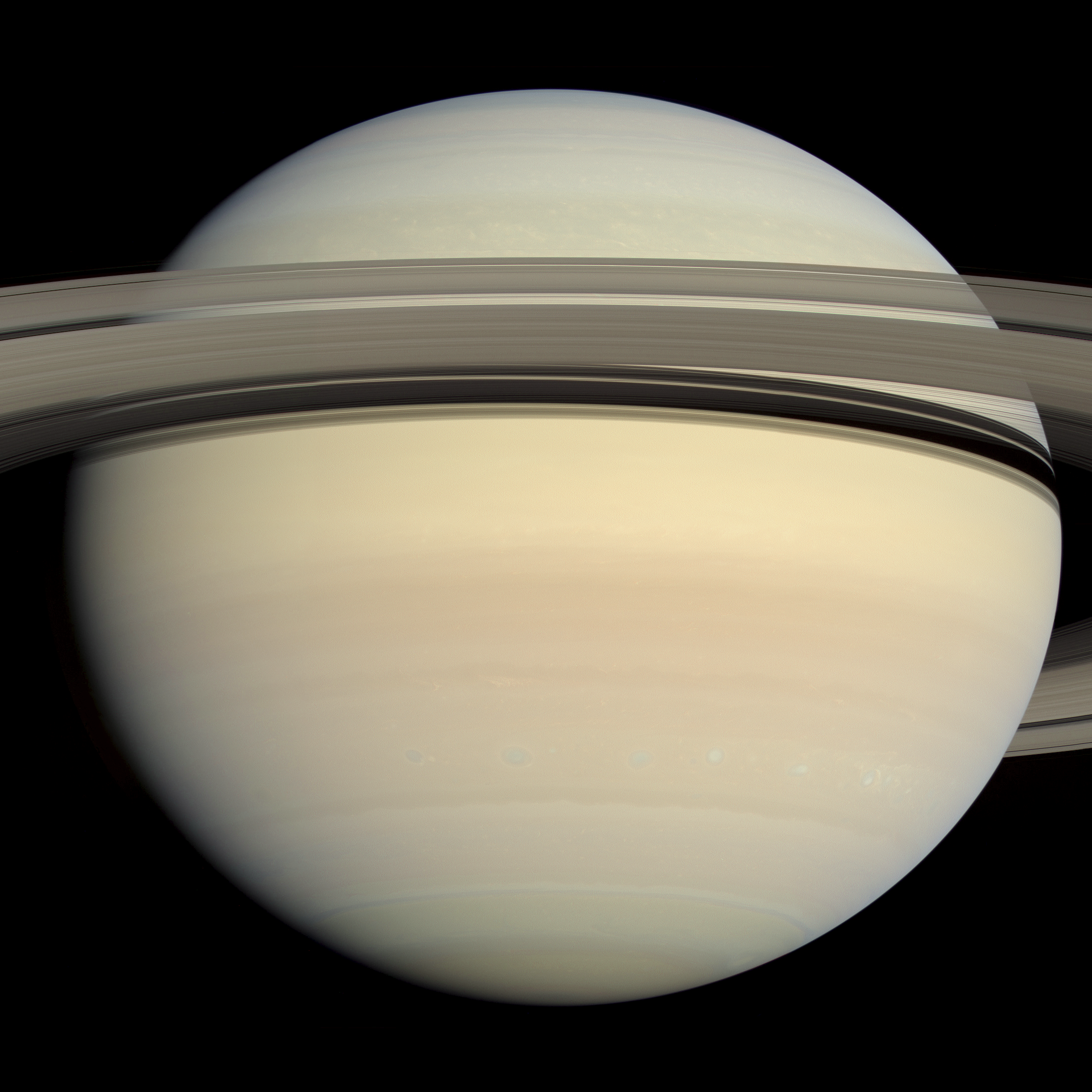

Saturn was Holst's favourite movement of the suite. Matthews describes it as "a slow processional which rises to a frightening climax before fading away as if into the outer reaches of space". The movement opens as a quiet adagio in 4/4 and the basic pace remains slow throughout, with short bursts of animato in the first part and a switch to andante in 3/2 in the later section. Apart from the timpani no percussion is used in this movement except for tubular bells at climactic points. At the beginning, flutes, bassoons and harps play a theme suggesting a ticking clock. A solemn melody is introduced by the trombones (Holst's own main instrument) and taken up by the full orchestra. A development of the ticking theme leads to a clangorous triple forte climax, after which the music dies away and ends quietly.

=== VI. Uranus, the Magician ===
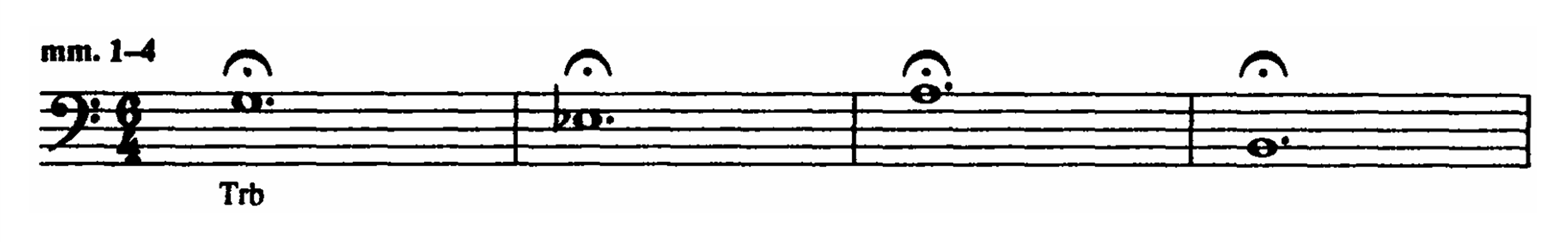
Opening motif

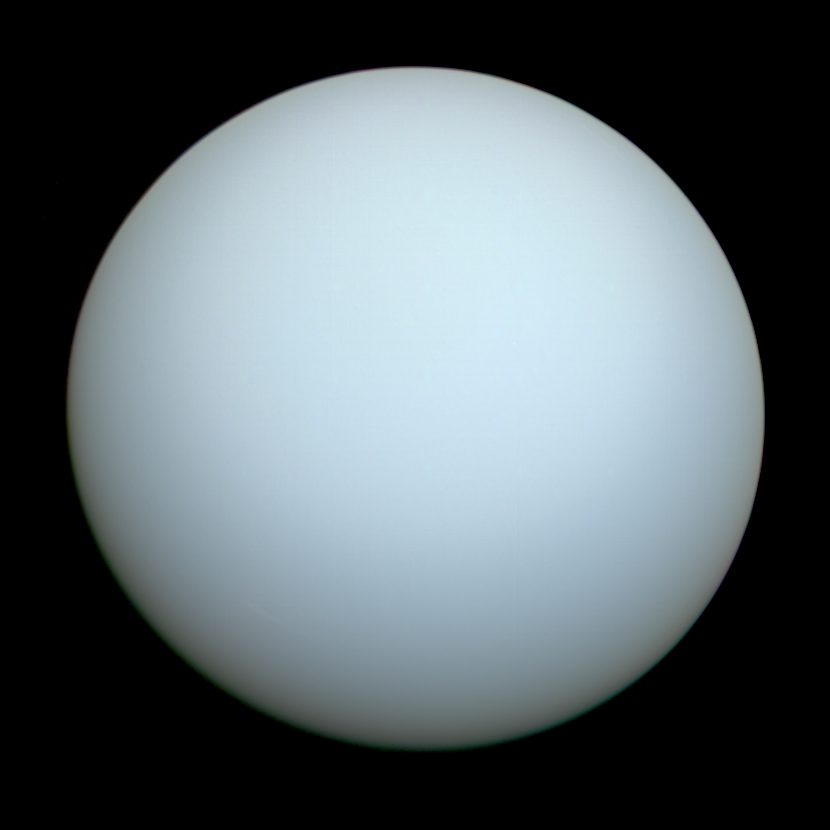

Matthews describes the character of the movement as that of "a clumsy dance, which gradually gets more and more out of hand (not unlike Paul Dukas's Sorcerer's Apprentice) until, with what seems like a magic wand, all is abruptly swept away into the far distance". (Note: Short writes that despite reminiscences of the Pan motif in Ravel's Daphnis et Chloé and of Berlioz's Symphonie fantastique and the "Infernal Dance" in Stravinsky's The Firebird the main influence on the movement is clearly The Sorcerer’s Apprentice, which was first performed in London in 1899 and was "doubtless well known to Holst".) The movement, which begins with what Short calls "a tremendous four-note brass motif", is marked allegro in 6/4. The music proceeds in "a series of merry pranks" with occasional interjections in 9/4, building to a quadruple forte climax with a prominent organ glissando, after which the music suddenly drops to a pianissimo lento before alternating quick and slow sections bring the movement to its pianissimo conclusion.

=== VII. Neptune, the Mystic ===
Opening bars

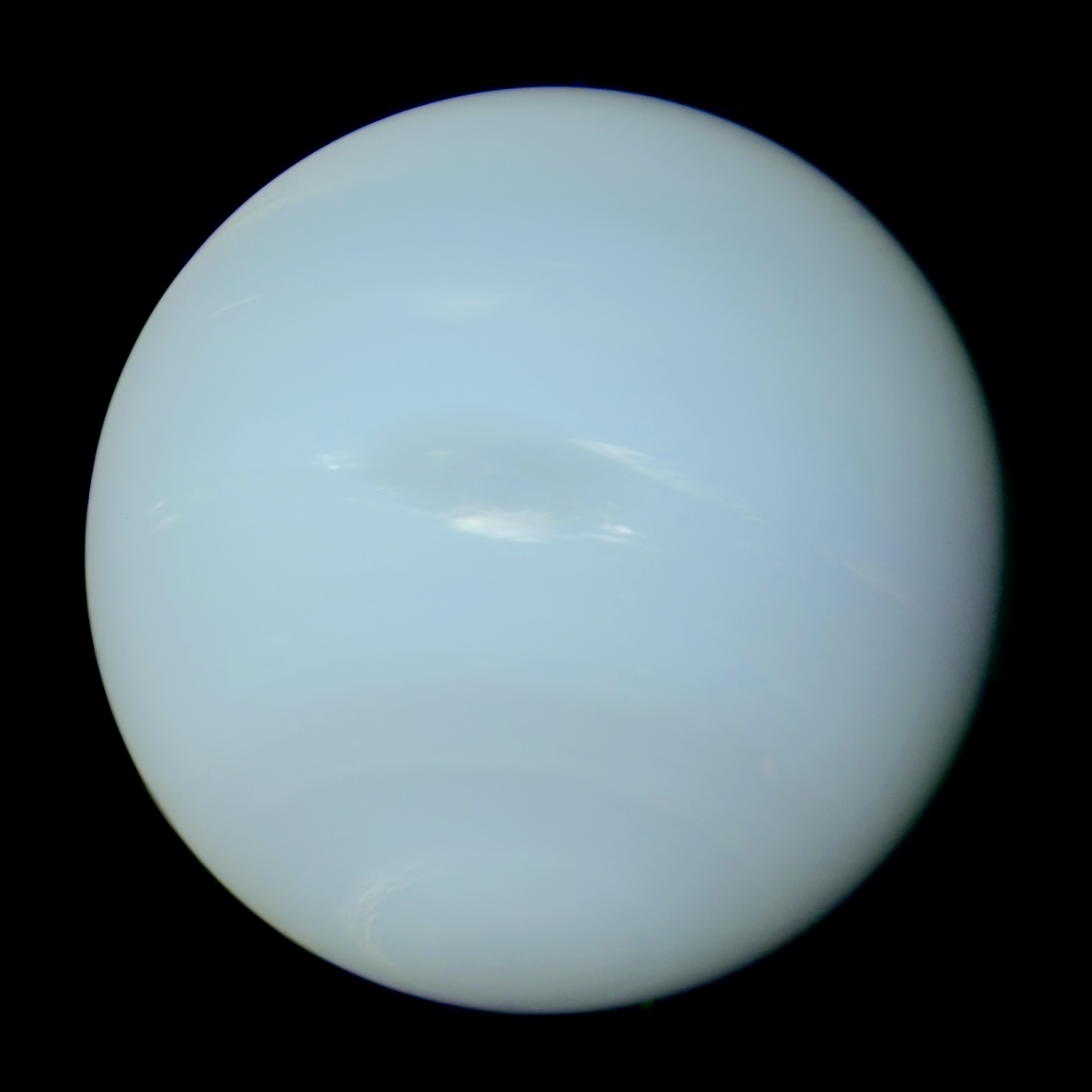

The music of the last movement is quiet throughout, in a swaying, irregular metre, opening with flutes joined by piccolo and oboes, with harps and celesta prominent later. Holst makes much use of dissonance in this movement. Before the premiere his colleague Geoffrey Toye said that a bar where the brass play chords of E minor and G♯ minor together was "going to sound frightful". Holst agreed, and said it had made him shudder when he wrote it down but, "What are you to do when they come like that?" As the movement develops, the orchestra is joined by an offstage female chorus singing a soft wordless line: this was unusual in orchestral works at the time, although Claude Debussy had used the same device in his Nocturnes (1900). The orchestra falls silent and the unaccompanied voices bring the work to a pianissimo conclusion in an uncertain tonality, as a door between the singers and the auditorium is gradually closed. (Note: The choir sings alternating C minor and E major chords, and the musician David Owen Norris has commented that as the door shuts it is pure chance whether the last chord heard is C minor (looking back at the key of Mars) or E. In a 2014 article William Weir suggests that the closing bars of Neptune are an early precursor of the electronic fade-out that became ubiquitous in recordings of popular music in the 1950s to the 1980s.)

== Reception ==
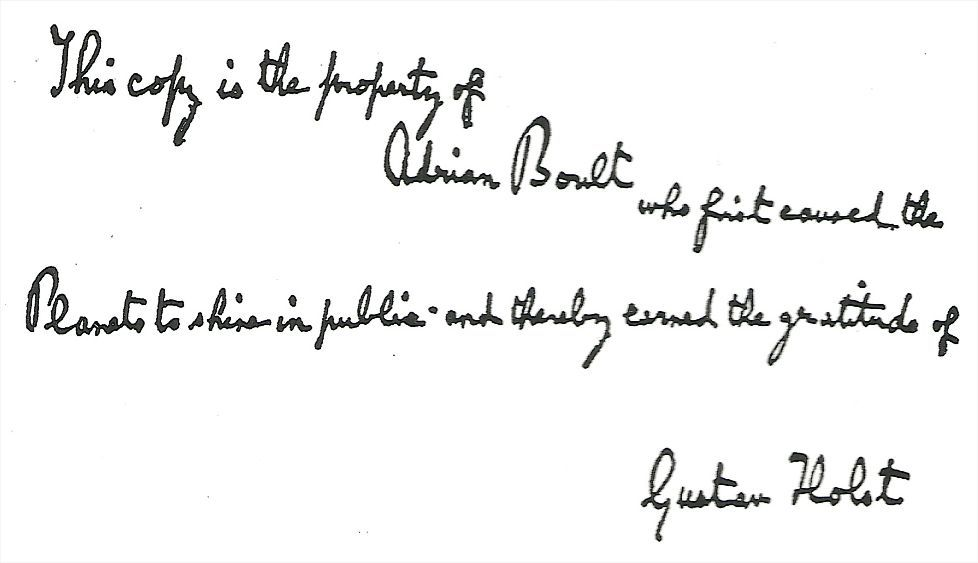
Holst's inscription on Boult's copy of the score

Imogen Holst wrote of the 1918 premiere under Boult:

Even those listeners who had studied the score for months were taken aback by the unexpected clamour of Mars. During Jupiter the charwomen working in the corridors put down their scrubbing-brushes and began to dance. In Saturn the isolated listeners in the dark, half-empty hall felt themselves growing older at every bar. But it was the end of Neptune that was unforgettable, with its hidden chorus of women's voices growing fainter and fainter in the distance, until the imagination knew no difference between sound and silence.

When the music was first introduced to the general public in February 1919, critical opinion was divided. Greene prints a summary of reviews of the first four public performances of the suite (or movements from it) in February and November 1919 and October and November 1920. Positive reviews are recorded in 28 of the 37 papers, magazines and journals cited. A small minority of reviewers were particularly hostile, among them those of The Globe ("Noisy and pretentious)"; The Sunday Times ("Pompous, noisy and unalluring"), and The Times ("a great disappointment ... elaborately contrived and painful to hear"). (Note: The anonymous critic was equally dismissive of Ravel's Rapsodie espagnole given at the same concert.) The critic in The Saturday Review wrote that Holst evidently regarded the planets "as objectionable nuisances that he would oust from our orbit if he could".

The Times rapidly changed its mind; in July 1919 it called Holst the most intriguing of his compeers and commented, "The Planets still leaves us gasping"; after hearing Holst conduct three of the movements in November 1919 the paper's critic declared the piece "the first music by an Englishman we have heard for some time which is neither conventional nor negligible", and by the time of Holst's death in 1934 the paper's assessment of the piece was "Holst's greatest work":

Each of the seven numbers shows one aspect of life regarded with a detached and unflinching scrutiny. In this suite Holst, with the directness which was characteristic of his personal intercourse and character, and which comes out in spite of all his mysticism in the technique of his music, sets forth with every elaboration his fundamentally simple view of what life brings. The work is original in conception, in its philosophical implications, in its scoring, and in its harmonic and rhythmic idiom.

The Sunday Times, too, quickly changed its line. In 1920 its new music critic, Ernest Newman, said that Holst could do "easily, without a fuss" what some other composers could only do "with an effort and a smirk", and that in The Planets he showed "one of the subtlest and most original minds of our time. It begins working at a musical problem where most other minds would leave off". Newman compared Holst's harmonic innovations to those of Stravinsky, to the latter's disadvantage, and expressed none of the reservations that qualified his admiration of Schoenberg's Five Pieces for Orchestra.

== Recordings ==
There have been at least 80 commercial recordings of The Planets. Holst conducted the London Symphony Orchestra in the first two recorded performances: the first was an acoustic recording made in sessions between September 1922 and November 1923; the second was made in 1926 using the new electrical recording process.

Holst conducting The Planets in 1922–23

Holst's tempi are in general faster than those of most of his successors on record. This may have been due to the need to fit the music on 78 rpm discs, although later 78 versions are slower. Holst's later recording is quicker than the acoustic version, possibly because the electrical process required wider grooves, reducing the available playing time. Other, slower, recordings from the 78 era include those conducted by Leopold Stokowski (1943) and Sir Adrian Boult (1945).

Recordings from the LP age are also typically longer than the composer's, but from the digital era a 2010 recording by the London Philharmonic Orchestra conducted by Vladimir Jurowski is quicker than Holst's acoustic version and comes close to matching his 1926 speeds, and in two movements (Venus and Uranus) surpasses them. There were no commercial recordings of the work in the 1930s; timings are given below of a recording representing each subsequent decade up to the 2020s:

Conductor:	Holst	Holst	Stokowski	Boult	Sargent	Karajan	Steinberg	Mackerras	Gardiner	Rattle	Jurowski	Harding
Orchestra:	LSO	LSO	NBCSO	BBCSO	BBCSO	VPO	BSO	RLPO	PO	BPO	LPO	BRSO
Year:	1922–23	1926	1943	1945	1957	1961	1971	1988	1997	2006	2010	2023
Mars:	06:13	06:12	06:52	06:58	06:56	07:02	06:37	07:01	08:03	07:25	06:31	08:22
Venus:	08:04	07:19	08:45	07:52	09:11	08:21	07:25	08:05	07:37	08:59	06:52	08:48
Mercury:	03:36	03:33	03:36	03:40	03:33	03:59	03:59	03:56	03:51	04:02	03:46	04:14
Jupiter:	07:04	07:02	07:05	07:50	07:45	07:38	08:01	07:36	07:17	08:02	07:06	08:23
Saturn:	07:00	06:58	09:05	08:09	09:35	08:33	07:45	09:20	09:13	09:35	07:24	10:57
Uranus:	06:06	05:57	05:41	05:41	06:01	05:47	05:24	06:10	05:34	06:04	05:38	06:12
Neptune:	05:31	05:35	09:50	06:23	07:12	07:38	06:47	06:59	08:11	07:02	05:49	09:49
Total time:	43:34	42:36	52:34	46:33	50:11	48:58	45:58	49:07	49:46	51:09	43:04	56:48

Source: Naxos Music Library.

== Additions, adaptations and influences ==
Astrological symbol of Pluto

There have been many adaptations of the suite, and several attempts to add an eighth planet – Pluto – in the time between its discovery in 1930 and its reclassification by the IAU to dwarf planet in 2006. The most prominent of these was Matthews's 2000 composition, "Pluto, the Renewer", commissioned by the Hallé Orchestra. Dedicated posthumously to Imogen Holst, it was first performed in Manchester on 11 May 2000, with Kent Nagano conducting. Matthews changed the ending of Neptune slightly so that the movement would segue into Pluto. Matthews's Pluto has been recorded, coupled with Holst's suite, on at least four occasions. (Note: The Hallé, conducted by Mark Elder (2001); Royal Scottish National Orchestra conducted by David Lloyd-Jones (2002); Royal Philharmonic Orchestra conducted by Owain Arwel Hughes (2004); and Berlin Philharmonic conducted by Sir Simon Rattle (2006).) Others who have produced versions of Pluto for The Planets include Leonard Bernstein. Jun Nagao has produced a version of the Earth.

The suite has been adapted for numerous instruments and instrumental combinations, including organ, synthesiser, brass band, and jazz orchestra. Holst used the melody of the central section of "Jupiter" for a setting ("Thaxted") of the hymn "I Vow to Thee, My Country" in 1921.

The Planets has been taken as an influence by various rock bands, and for film scores such as those for the Star Wars series. There have been numerous references to the suite in popular culture, from films to television and video games.

== Notes, references and sources ==
=== Sources ===
- Bax, Clifford (1936). Ideas and People. London: Lovat Dickson. OCLC 9302579.
- Boult, Adrian (1973). My Own Trumpet. London: Hamish Hamilton. ISBN 978-0-24-102445-4.
- Boult, Adrian (1979). Music and Friends. London: Hamish Hamilton. ISBN 978-0-24-110178-0.
- Greene, Richard (1995). Holst: The Planets. Cambridge: Cambridge University Press. ISBN 978-0-52-145000-3.
- Holst, Gustav (1921). The Planets: Suite for Large Orchestra. London: Boosey & Hawkes. OCLC 873691404.
- Holst, Imogen (1974). A Thematic Catalogue of Gustav Holst's Music. London: Faber & Faber. ISBN 978-0-57-110004-0.
- Holst, Imogen (1981). Holst. London: Faber & Faber. ISBN 978-0-57-118032-5.
- Holst, Imogen (1986). The Music of Gustav Holst. Oxford and New York: Oxford University Press. ISBN 978-0-19-315458-2.
- Holst, Imogen (2008) [1969]. Gustav Holst: A Biography (second ed.). London: Faber & Faber. ISBN 978-0-571-24199-6.
- Kennedy, Michael (1987). Adrian Boult. London: Hamish Hamilton. ISBN 978-0-33-348752-5.
- Leo, Alan (1905). What is a Horoscope and How is it Cast? (second ed.). London: Modern Astrology. OCLC 561872689.
- Short, Michael (1990). Gustav Holst: The Man and his Music. Oxford and New York: Oxford University Press. ISBN 978-0-19-314154-4.
- Vaughan Williams, Ursula (1964). RVW: A Biography of Ralph Vaughan Williams. Oxford: Oxford University Press. ISBN 978-0-19-315411-7.
