= Nightfall Overture =

Studio album of re-recorded songs by Nightingale
- Released: 2005
- Length: 44:34
- Label: Black Mark

Nightingale chronology
| Invisible (2004) | Nightfall Overture (2005) | White Darkness (2007) |

Nightfall Overture is a studio album by the Swedish rock band Nightingale. The release includes eight re-recorded songs from the band's first four albums (The Breathing Shadow, The Closing Chronicles, I and Alive Again), a cover version of an Edge of Sanity song from Infernal, as well as a brand new song, "Better Safe Than Sorry". The album has collectible status due to its limited press and high demand.

The album was remastered in 2024 and released on vinyl and as a 2-CD set, including bonus live tracks.

== Track listing ==
| No. | Title | Length |
|---|---|---|
| 1. | "Nightfall Overture" | 7:25 |
| 2. | "The Dreamreader" | 5:00 |
| 3. | "Revival" | 4:24 |
| 4. | "Steal the Moon" | 3:14 |
| 5. | "Alonely" | 3:51 |
| 6. | "I Return" | 3:39 |
| 7. | "The Glory Days" | 5:06 |
| 8. | "Shadowland Serenade" | 5:10 |
| 9. | "Losing Myself" (Edge of Sanity cover) | 3:52 |
| 10. | "Better Safe Than Sorry" | 5:43 |
| Total length: | | 44:34 |

== Credits ==
=== Band members ===
- Dan Swanö - vocals, guitar, keyboards
- Tom Nouga (a.k.a. Dag Swanö) - guitar, keyboards, vocals
- Erik Oskarsson - bass, vocals
- Tom Björn - drums, cymbals

=== Guest Musicians ===
- Craig Smith - lead guitar (7)
