= Cryptic (album) =

Studio album by Edge of Sanity
- Released: December 1, 1997
- Recorded: 1997
- Genre: Melodic death metal
- Length: 35:33
- Label: Black Mark
- Producer: Ronny Lahti

Edge of Sanity chronology
Infernal (1997)	Cryptic (1997)	Crimson II (2003)

Professional ratings
Review scores
Source	Rating
Allmusic	2.5/5 stars

Cryptic is the seventh full-length studio album by the Swedish death metal band Edge of Sanity, released on December 1, 1997 by Black Mark Production.

Cryptic is the only Edge of Sanity album to not feature any contributions from Dan Swanö. Guitarist Andreas Axelsson hired vocalist Robert Karlsson, who was previously the vocalist in Swanö's avant-garde death metal band Pan.Thy.Monium, in an attempt to keep the band together. Despite this, all members of this short-lived lineup of the band would depart following the album's release.

== Track listing ==
No.	Title	Length
1.	"Hell Written"	4:35
2.	"Uncontroll Me"	5:55
3.	"No Destiny"	3:36
4.	"Demon I"	4:16
5.	"Not of This World"	3:51
6.	"Dead I Walk"	3:26
7.	"Born, Breed, Bleeding"	4:30
8.	"Bleed You Dry"	5:24
Total length:		35:33

== Personnel ==
Edge of Sanity

- Robert Karlsson − lead vocals
- Andreas Axelsson − electric guitar
- Sami Nerberg − electric guitar
- Anders Lindberg − bass guitar
- Benny Larsson − drums, percussion

Production

- Martin Ahx – artwork, cover art
- Susan Nerberg – artwork, photography
- Anders Forsberg – executive producer
- Alejandro Palavecino – photography
- Peter in de Betou – mastering
- Michael Semprevivo – layout, typography
- Ronny Lahti – producer, engineering, mixing

== Charts ==
Chart performance for Cryptic
Chart (2026)	Peak position
French Rock & Metal Albums (SNEP)	86
