= Infernal (Edge of Sanity album) =

Studio album by Edge of Sanity
- Released: February 5, 1997
- Recorded: December 1996
- Studio: The Abyss
- Genre: Melodic death metal
- Length: 49:54
- Label: Black Mark
- Producer: Peter Tägtgren

Edge of Sanity chronology
Crimson (1996)	Infernal (1997)	Cryptic (1997)

Professional ratings
Review scores
Source	Rating
Allmusic	link
Vampire Magazine	decent link

Infernal is the sixth full-length studio album by the Swedish death metal band Edge of Sanity, released by Black Mark Production on February 5, 1997.

Dan Swanö left the band after recording for the album was completed due to artistic differences between himself and Andreas Axelsson. Swanö would later return and continue using the Edge of Sanity name after the other members had disbanded following the release of Cryptic.

Swanö's other band Nightingale recorded a cover version of the song "Losing Myself" for their album Nightfall Overture.

== Track listing ==
No.	Title	Lyrics	Music	Length
1.	"Hell Is Where The Heart Is"	Jonas Larsson	Swanö	5:26
2.	"Helter Skelter"	Axelsson	Axelsson, Larsson	2:28
3.	"15:36"	Anders Jakobson	Swanö	4:54
4.	"The Bleakness Of It All"	Axelsson	Axelsson, Larsson	3:32
5.	"Damned (By The Damned)"	Axelsson	Axelsson, Larsson	5:31
6.	"Forever Together Forever"	Mikael Åkerfeldt	Swanö	4:27
7.	"Losing Myself"	Jonas Renkse	Swanö	3:38
8.	"Hollow"	Lindberg	Axelsson, Larsson	4:26
9.	"Inferno"	Axelsson	Axelsson, Larsson	3:29
10.	"Burn The Sun"	Axelsson	Axelsson, Larsson, Nerberg	6:30
11.	"The Last Song"	Swanö	Swanö	5:33

== Credits ==
Edge of Sanity

- Dan Swanö − lead vocals (on tracks 1, 3, 5–11), electric guitar, bass guitar, E-Bow (on tracks 1, 3, 6, 7 & 11), piano (on track 11)
- Andreas Axelsson − lead vocals (on tracks 2 & 4), electric guitar (on tracks 2, 4, 5, 8–10)
- Anders Lindberg − bass guitar (on tracks 2, 4, 5, 8–10)
- Benny Larsson − drums, percussion

Guests

- Peter Tägtgren − lead guitar (on track 4)
- Anders Mareby − cello (on track 11)
