= Nothing but Death Remains =

Studio album by Edge of Sanity
- Released: 9 July 1991
- Recorded: January 1991 at Montezuma Studio, Stockholm
- Genre: Death metal
- Length: 31:55
- Label: Black Mark
- Producers: Boss, Edge of Sanity

Edge of Sanity chronology
The Immortal Rehearsals (1990)	Nothing but Death Remains (1991)	Unorthodox (1992)

Professional ratings
Review scores
Source	Rating
AllMusic	link

Nothing but Death Remains is the first studio album by the Swedish death metal band Edge of Sanity, released by Black Mark Production on 9 July 1991. It is dedicated to the memory of John Med Gummihandsken.

The album was both remixed and remastered by Dan Swanö in 2024. Both new editions of the album were released by Century Media on 23 August 2024.

== Track listing ==
No.	Title	Length
1.	"Tales...."	6:06
2.	"Human Aberration"	3:38
3.	"Maze of Existence (Epidemic Reign Part I)"	4:17
4.	"The Dead"	3:54
5.	"Decepted by the Cross"	3:50
6.	"Angel of Distress"	3:28
7.	"Impulsive Necroplasma (Epidemic Reign Part II)"	3:05
8.	"Immortal Souls"	3:35
Total length:		31:55

Japanese edition bonus track
No.	Title	Length
9.	"Pernicious Anguish"	2:10
Total length:		34:05

== Personnel ==
=== Edge of Sanity ===
- Dan Swanö – vocals, keyboards
- Benny Larsson – drums
- Andreas Axelsson – guitar
- Anders Lindberg – bass
- Sami Nerberg – guitar

=== Production ===
- Produced by Börje "Boss" Forsberg
- Recorded by Rex
- Mixed by Börje "Boss" Forsberg, Dan Swanö and Rex
- Gunnar Swanö – logo
- Gunnar Johansson – photography
- Micke Sjöblom – layout
- Lennart Lindberg – cover art
