= Purgatory Afterglow =

Studio album by Edge of Sanity
- Released: 1 October 1994
- Recorded: July 1994, Unisound Studios, Örebro, Sweden
- Genres: Melodic death metal, progressive death metal
- Length: 45:11
- Label: Black Mark
- Producers: Dan Swanö; Edge of Sanity

Edge of Sanity chronology
| Until Eternity Ends (1994) | Purgatory Afterglow (1994) | Crimson (1996) |

Professional ratings
Review scores
| Source | Rating |
|---|---|
| AllMusic | 4.5/5 stars |
| Vampire Magazine | (favorable) |

Purgatory Afterglow is the fourth full-length studio album by Swedish death metal band Edge of Sanity. The album was recorded by Dan Swanö in Unisound Studios, Örebro, Sweden, in July 1994 and released in 1994 by Black Mark Production.

There are two different versions of the CD; a mirror-like disc with black letters and a black disc with gold letters. The Japanese release features the tracks "Until Eternity Ends" and "Eternal Eclipse" from the Until Eternity Ends EP. A music video was made for the song "Black Tears".

The record was both remixed and remastered by Dan Swanö in 2024. Both new editions of the album were released by Century Media on June 21, 2024.

The album is dedicated to the memory of Kurt Cobain.

== Legacy ==
In July 2014, Guitar World ranked Purgatory Afterglow at number 35 in their "Superunknown: 50 Iconic Albums That Defined 1994" list.

"Black Tears" was covered by the bands Eternal Tears of Sorrow, on their album Chaotic Beauty, and Heaven Shall Burn, on their album Iconoclast (Part 1: The Final Resistance).

== Track listing ==
All songs written and composed by Dan Swanö, unless otherwise mentioned.

| No. | Title | Lyrics | Music | Length |
|---|---|---|---|---|
| 1. | "Twilight" | | | 7:51 |
| 2. | "Of Darksome Origin" | Swanö; Andreas Axelsson | Swanö; Axelsson | 5:02 |
| 3. | "Blood-Colored" | Swanö; Axelsson | | 4:01 |
| 4. | "Silent" | | | 5:06 |
| 5. | "Black Tears" | | | 3:15 |
| 6. | "Elegy" | | Swanö; Axelsson | 3:57 |
| 7. | "Velvet Dreams" | Axelsson | Axelsson; Swanö | 7:11 |
| 8. | "Enter Chaos" | Axelsson | Axelsson | 2:24 |
| 9. | "The Sinner and the Sadness" | | | 3:07 |
| 10. | "Song of Sirens" | Sami Nerberg; Axelsson | Swanö; Axelsson; Nerberg | 2:33 |
| Total length: | | | | 45:11 |

Japanese edition bonus tracks
| No. | Title | Length |
|---|---|---|
| 11. | "Until Eternity Ends" | 4:02 |
| 12. | "Eternal Eclipse" | 2:53 |
| Total length: | | 52:06 |

== Personnel ==
Edge of Sanity

- Dan Swanö – lead vocals, lead guitar (on tracks 3, 4 and 5), acoustic guitar (on track 5), harmony guitar (on tracks 6 and 9), keyboards (on tracks 1 & 5)
- Andreas Axelsson – lead vocals (on track 10), backing vocals (on tracks 2 & 7), lead guitar (on track 8), rhythm guitar, harmony guitar (on track 7)
- Sami Nerberg – lead vocals (on track 10), lead guitar (on track 8), rhythm guitar
- Anders Lindberg – bass guitar
- Benny Larsson – drums, percussion

Production

- Dan Swanö – engineering
- Necrolord – cover art
- Peter in de Betou – mastering
- Börje Forsberg – executive producer
- Åsa Jonsén – photography
