= Khaooohs and Kon-Fus-Ion =

Studio album by Pan.Thy.Monium
- Released: March 19, 1996
- Recorded: April 1995–January 1996 at Unisound Studios, Örebro, Sweden
- Genre: Avant-garde metal Progressive death metal
- Length: 34:25
- Label: Relapse Records
- Producer: Day DiSyraah

Pan.Thy.Monium chronology
Khaooohs (1993)	Khaooohs and Kon-Fus-Ion (1996)	...Dawn+Dream II (2010)

Khaooohs and Kon-Fus-Ion is the third and final album by avant-garde progressive death metal band Pan.Thy.Monium released in 1996.

The album's final track, "In Remembrance", is a literal minute of silence. Writing credit for the track is given to "Raagoonshinnaah", the fictional "mythological god" the band's music is based around.

== Track listing ==
All lyrics are written by Derelict.

No.	Title	Music	Length
1.	"The Battle of Geeheeb"	Pan.Thy.Monium	11:55
2.	"Thee-Pherenth"	Pan.Thy.Monium	14:49
3.	"Behrial"	Day DiSyraah	6:39
4.	"In Remembrance"	Raagoonshinnaah	1:00

== Personnel ==
Pan.Thy.Monium

- Robert Karlsson (credited as "Derelict") - vocals
- Benny Larsson (credited as "Winter") - drums, percussion, violin
- Dan Swanö (credited as "Day DiSyraah") - bass guitar, keyboards, sound effects
- Robert Ivarsson (credited as "Mourning") - rhythm guitar
- Dag Swanö (credited as "Äag") - lead guitar, organ, baritone saxophone

Production

- Matthew Jacobson - executive producer
- Bill Yurkiewicz - executive producer
- Paw Nielsen - cover art
- Dangerous Dave Shirk - mastering
- Day DiSyraah - producer
