= Retribution (Nightingale album) =

Studio album by Nightingale
- Released: (European Union) November 10, 2014 (United States) (Canada) January 27, 2015
- Studio: Various: Unisound (Örebro, Sweden); Studio Brun (Stockholm, Sweden); High Village Recordings (Sweden)
- Length: 44:28
- Label: Inside Out Music
- Producer: Dan Swanö

Nightingale chronology
White Darkness (2007)	Retribution (2014)	Rock Hard Live (2017)

Singles from Retribution
- 1. "Forevermore" Released: October 14, 2014; 2. "On Stolen Wings" Released: November 14, 2014

Retribution is the seventh studio album by Swedish rock band Nightingale, released on November 10, 2014 in Europe and January 27, 2015 in North America via Inside Out Music.

== Background ==
Vocalist and guitarist Dan Swanö commented on Retribution:

I felt that, unless it is the best possible Nightingale album, where every song on the album easily could replace any song from our previous albums, there was no point in making a new album at all. During the writing of the Witherscape debut album, I wrote a lot of stuff that would work better on a Nightingale album, and before I knew it, I had the skeleton for a lot of potentially awesome Nightingale songs! It was important that the new material had the vibe of the older albums, yet with a better production and performance. I am very confident that all the Nightingale fans will love Retribution since I made sure I felt the same rush inside me when I listened to the tracks that I did upon listening to the finished version of our most famous tracks from the past!

Swanö also elaborated on the song "Forevermore" and "On Stolen Wings":

"Forevermore" is a track that showcases both the metal and the more bombastic A.O.R. influences of Nightingale. It's a good summary of what to expect from the album... and then some! The lyrics tell the story of Jim Jones and The People's Temple seen from the perspective of a devoted follower of the cult.

After all the demos were done for the album, we gathered in the rehearsal room and gave them all a thorough spin. It took some time to get the arrangement right for "On Stolen Wings" and during the intense rehearsals there were a few "happy accidents" that completely changed the vibe of the song into something that I had been searching for all along. The lyrics deal with the kind of person that sucks the lifeblood out of creative people, that doesn't know how to bring their visions to the real world and then steal their ideas and then take full credit for it.

== Track listing ==
All music is composed by Dan Swanö, except "Chasing the Storm Away" composed by Dag Swanö

No.	Title	Lyrics	Length
1.	"On Stolen Wings"	Erik Oskarsson	4:29
2.	"Lucifer's Lament"	Erik Oskarsson	4:49
3.	"Chasing the Storm Away"	Erik Oskarsson	3:52
4.	"Warriors of the Dawn"	Tom Björn	3:41
5.	"Forevermore"	Erik Oskarsson	4:07
6.	"Divided I Fall"	Dan Swanö	3:39
7.	"The Voyage of Endurance"	Dan Swanö	5:06
8.	"27 (Curse or Coincidence?)"	Dan Swanö	5:10
9.	"The Maze"	Dan Swanö	3:52
10.	"Echoes of a Dream"	Tom Björn	5:43
Total length:			44:28

== Personnel ==
Nightingale

- Dan Swanö – vocals, guitars, keyboards
- Dag Swanö – guitars, keyboards
- Erik Oskarsson – bass
- Tom Björn – drums

Production

- Dan Swanö – production, mixing, mastering
- Travis Smith – artwork
- Thomas Ewerhard – layout
- Eva Maria Swanö – photography
