= ...Dawn+Dream II =

Compilation album by Pan.Thy.Monium
- Released: April 16, 2010
- Genres: Avant-garde metal Progressive death metal
- Length: 28:39
- Label: The Crypt Records

Pan.Thy.Monium chronology
Khaooohs and Kon-Fus-Ion (1993)	...Dawn+Dream II (2010)

...Dawn+Dream II is a compilation album by the avant-garde/progressive death metal band Pan.Thy.Monium. The album consists of the band's only demo and EP, ...Dawn and Dream II, respectively. It was released on vinyl strictly limited to a one-time-only pressing of 500 hand-numbered copies. 250 sets were on 180-gram black vinyl and 250 sets on 180-gram gold vinyl. Included in all 500 copies is a 24" x 36" (60.96 cm x 91.44 cm) poster of the original Dream II Paw Nielsen cover artwork.

== Track listing ==
1. "Dauwhnn" – 3:45
2. "Zenotaffph" – 3:14
3. "Klievieage" – 2:57
4. "Ekkhoeece" – 0:44
5. "I" – 4:26
6. "II" – 3:31
7. "III" – 3:46
8. "Vvoiiccheeces" – 1:29
9. "IV" – 5:47

== Credits ==
- Derelict aka Robert "Robban" Karlsson – vocals
- Winter aka Benny Larsson – drums, percussion and violin
- Day DiSyraah aka Dan Swanö – bass, keyboards and effects
- Mourning aka Robert Ivarsson – rhythm guitars
- Äag aka Tom Nouga aka Dag Swanö – lead guitars, organ and baritone saxophone
