= Death's Design =

Studio album by Diabolical Masquerade
- Released: March 2, 2001
- Genres: Avant-garde metal, extreme metal, progressive metal, ambient
- Length: 43:23
- Label: Avantgarde Music
- Producer: Dan Swanö

Diabolical Masquerade chronology
Nightwork (1998)	Death's Design (2001)

Professional ratings
Review scores
Source	Rating
Allmusic	link

Death's Design is Blakkheim's fourth and final album, released under the moniker of Diabolical Masquerade and his most experimental. The album is broken up into 20 movements, the shortest of which is just 6 seconds long. Also, the album seems to be without genre, changing directions many times. According to the last update of Blakkheim's website, it was to be an original motion picture soundtrack to a movie that was never made but that turned out to be a prank on everyone by Blakkheim. The European version features 61 tracks while the US release has 36, and both have a similar length.

== Track listing ==
No.	Title	Length
1.	"Nerves in Rush"	0:06
2.	"Death Ascends - The Hunt (Part I)"	0:16
3.	"You Can't Hide Forever"	0:24
4.	"Right on Time for Murder - The Hunt (Part II)"	1:31
5.	"Conscious in No Materia"	0:40
6.	"A Different Plane"	0:21
7.	"Invisible to Us"	0:41
8.	"The One Who Hides a Face Inside"	1:09
9.	"...And Don't Ever Listen to What It Says"	0:57
10.	"Revelation of the Puzzle"	0:57
11.	"Human Prophecy"	0:20
12.	"Where the Suffering Leads"	0:19
13.	"The Remains of Galactic Expulsions"	0:12
14.	"With Panic in the Heart"	0:22
15.	"Out from the Dark"	0:46
16.	"Still Coming at You"	0:29
17.	"Out from a Deeper Dark"	0:28
18.	"Spinning Back the Clocks"	1:42
19.	"Soaring over Dead Rooms"	2:19
20.	"The Enemy Is the Earth"	0:35
21.	"Recall"	0:14
22.	"All Exits Blocked"	0:35
23.	"The Memory Is Weak"	0:11
24.	"Struck at Random/Outermost Fear"	0:20
25.	"Sparks of Childhood Coming Back"	0:27
26.	"Old People's Voodoo Seance"	1:25
27.	"Mary-Lee Goes Crazy"	0:32
28.	"Something Has Arrived"	0:15
29.	"Possession of the Voodoo Party"	0:46
30.	"Not of Flesh, Not of Blood"	0:50
31.	"Intact with a Human Psyche"	1:02
32.	"Keeping Faith"	1:07
33.	"Someone Knows What Scares You"	0:30
34.	"A Bad Case of Nerves"	0:50
35.	"The Inverted Dream/No Sleep in Peace"	0:16
36.	"Information"	0:17
37.	"Setting the Course"	0:52
38.	"Ghost Inhabitants"	0:50
39.	"Fleeing from Town"	1:02
40.	"Overlooked Parts"	0:50
41.	"A New Spark - Victory Theme (Part I)"	0:49
42.	"Hope - Victory Theme (Part II)"	1:01
43.	"Family Portraits - Victory Theme (Part III)"	0:36
44.	"Smokes Start to Churn"	0:08
45.	"Hesitant Behaviour"	1:35
46.	"A Hurricane of Rotten Air"	0:19
47.	"Mastering the Clock"	0:55
48.	"They Come, You Go"	2:11
49.	"Haarad el Chamon"	0:20
50.	"The Egyptian Resort"	0:35
51.	"The Pyramid"	0:24
52.	"Frenzy Moods and Other Oddities"	1:10
53.	"Still Part of the Design - The Hunt (Part III)"	0:18
54.	"Definite Departure"	0:37
55.	"Returning to Haarad el Chamon"	0:45
56.	"Life Eater"	0:32
57.	"The Pulze"	0:27
58.	"The Defiled Feeds"	0:36
59.	"The River in Space"	0:56
60.	"A Soulflight Back to Life"	1:18
61.	"Instant Rebirth - Alternate Ending"	0:06
Total length:		43:23

| Notes: The tracks are in 20 Movements

== Credits ==
Diabolical Masquerade

- Blakkheim - rhythm/lead/ acoustic and midi guitars, ambiances and vocals
- Dan Swanö - Keyboards, ambiences and lead guitar solo on "Keeping Faith" plus keyboard solo on "A Hurricane Of Rotten Air" (Session musician)
- Sean C. Bates - Drums and percussion (Session musician)
- Ingmar Döhn - Bass guitar (Session musician)

The Maalten Quartet, Estonia

- Artieer Garsnek - violin #1
- Jaak Gunst - violin #2
- Heiki Schmolski - violin #3
- Elmo Meltz - viola

Other Personnel

- AAG (Dag Swanö) - Guitar solo on "Possession Of The Voodoo Party", "Frenzy Moods And Other Oddities", "They Come, You Go", "Still Part Of The Design - The Hunt (Part III)" and "The Defiled Feeds"
- Patrik Sesfors - jazz guitar on "Overlooked Parts" and "Mastering The Clock"
- Konstantin Uweholst - cello
- Jaari Fleger - grand piano
