= Ravendusk in My Heart =

Studio album by Diabolical Masquerade
- Released: August 1, 1996
- Recorded: September 1995 at Unisound
- Genres: Black metal, melodic black metal
- Length: 42:15
- Label: Adipocere
- Producer: Dan Swanö

Diabolical Masquerade chronology
Promo 1993 (1993)	Ravendusk in My Heart (1996)	The Phantom Lodge (1997)

Ravendusk in My Heart is the debut studio album by Swedish black metal band Diabolical Masquerade. It was released in 1996.

In 2013, Decibel ranked Ravendusk in My Heart at number 69 on its list of the Top 100 Black Metal Albums of All Time.

== Track listing ==
No.	Title	Length
1.	"The Castle of Blackheim"	7:14
2.	"Blackheim's Quest to Bring Back the Stolen Autumn"	6:17
3.	"Beyond the Spiritual Moon"	0:56
4.	"The Sphere in Blackheim's Shrine"	3:32
5.	"Under the Banner of the Sentinel"	3:14
6.	"Blackheim's Forest Kept the Seasons Forever"	6:09
7.	"The Darkblue Seajourneys of the Sentinel"	5:02
8.	"Blackheim's Hunt for Nocturnal Grace"	7:46
9.	"Ravendusk in My Heart"	2:05
Total length:		42:15

== Personnel ==
- Blakkheim – vocals, guitar, bass, programming, keyboards, sound effects

=== Additional personnel ===
- Dan Swanö – additional vocals on "Under the Banner of the Sentinel", drums, mixing, engineering, programming, keyboards, production
- Peter in de Betou – mastering (at The Cutting Room)
- Mala – album art, photography
- Tati S. – photography
