= When All Is Said =

Compilation album by Edge of Sanity
- Released: 2 October 2006
- Recorded: Various dates
- Genre: Progressive death metal Melodic death metal Death metal
- Length: 149:56
- Label: Black Mark
- Producer: Dan Swanö

Edge of Sanity chronology
Crimson II (2003)	When All Is Said (2006)

Professional ratings
Review scores
Source	Rating
AllMusic	4/5 stars

When All Is Said is a remastered best-of compilation album by the Swedish death metal band Edge of Sanity, released by Black Mark Production on 2 October 2006. On the promotional poster released by Black Mark Production, it reads: "Very remastered by Dan Swanö". On the album cover are mini-pictures of the album covers from all their major releases. Although the two "Crimson" records are featured on a second compact disc, they were remixed and slightly edited in order to be placed together on the same disc, explaining the shortened run time of the two songs.

The album's title comes from the track of the same name on the band's second studio release, Unorthodox, which is not included in the compilation.

== Track listing ==
=== Disc 1 ===
1. "Tales" – 6:02
2. "Human Aberration" – 3:34
3. "Enigma" – 7:02
4. "In the Veins/Darker Than Black" – 4:36
5. "Lost" – 4:32
6. "The Masque" – 6:36
7. "Until Eternity Ends" – 3:58
8. "Eternal Eclipse" – 2:51
9. "Twilight" – 7:51
10. "Black Tears" – 3:08
11. "15:36" – 4:37
12. "Hell Is Where the Heart Is" – 5:15
13. "Hellwritten" – 4:33
14. "Bleed You Dry" – 5:24

=== Disc 2 ===
1. Crimson – 38:35
2. Crimson II – 41:22
