= The Phantom Lodge =

Studio album by Diabolical Masquerade
- Released: April 4, 1997
- Recorded: September 1996 at Unisound
- Genre: Black metal, melodic black metal
- Length: 42:37
- Label: Adipocere
- Producer: Dan Swanö

Diabolical Masquerade chronology
Ravendusk in My Heart (1996)	The Phantom Lodge (1997)	Nightwork (1998)

The Phantom Lodge is the second studio album by Swedish black metal band Diabolical Masquerade. Dan Swanö played a much smaller part on this album than previously, doing heavy metal vocals on "Hater" only and assisting Blakkheim in producing. However, there were a few guest appearances.

== Track listing ==
No.	Title	Length
1.	"Astray Within the Coffinwood Mill"	4:07
2.	"The Puzzling Constellation of a Deathrune"	6:09
3.	"Ravenclaw"	8:15
4.	"The Walk of the Hunchbacked"	4:31
5.	"Cloaked by the Moonshine Mist"	5:14
6.	"Across the Open Vault and Away..."	1:52
7.	"Hater"	2:38
8.	"The Blazing Demondome of Murmurs and Secrecy"	5:00
9.	"Upon the Salty Wall of the Broody Gargoyle"	4:51
Total length:		42:37

== Personnel ==
- Blakkheim - guitars, bass guitar, programming, keyboard, vocals, producer, artwork, art director

=== Additional personnel ===
- Sean C. Bates - drums, percussion
- Dan Swanö - vocals on "Hater", producer, engineering, mixing
- Roger Öberg - vocals on "Astray Within the Coffinwood Mill"
- Igmar Dohn - bass on "Cloaked by the Moonshine Mist"
- Marie Gaard Engberg - flute on tracks 5 and 6
- Tina Sahlstedt - flute on tracks 5 and 6
- Jeroen van Valkenburg - artwork
- Jean-Pascal Fournier - cover art
- Peter in de Betou - mastering
- Mala - photography
