= The Spectral Sorrows =

Studio album by Edge of Sanity
- Released: November 15, 1993
- Recorded: July–August 1993
- Studio: Unisound Recordings, Finspång, Sweden
- Genre: Melodic death metal, progressive death metal
- Length: 54:02
- Label: Black Mark
- Producer: Edge of Sanity

Edge of Sanity chronology
Unorthodox (1992)	The Spectral Sorrows (1993)	Until Eternity Ends (1994)

Professional ratings
Review scores
Source	Rating
AllMusic	4/5 stars
Collector's Guide to Heavy Metal	8/10
Rock Hard	9.5/10

The Spectral Sorrows is the third studio album by the Swedish death metal band Edge of Sanity, released through Black Mark Production on November 15, 1993.

== Background and recording ==
The album was recorded by Dan Swanö in July–August 1993. Bassist Anders Lindberg does not appear on the album as he was completing his mandatory military service at the time.

== Release history ==
The record was both remixed and remastered by Swanö in 2024. Both new editions of the album were released by Century Media in December 6, 2024. The remixed album featured a re-recording of the closing track "A Serenade for the Dead", arranged and recorded by Swanö himself.

== Music ==
The Spectral Sorrows continues Edge of Sanity's progression to a more progressive and melodic death metal sound. The album features a greater focus on clean vocals than the band's previous works, specifically on their cover of "Blood of My Enemies" by Manowar and "Sacrificed", the latter having more of a cleanly-sung gothic style reminiscent of The Sisters of Mercy. The clean vocals are sung in the baritone range.

== Track listing ==
No.	Title	Lyrics	Music	Length
1.	"The Spectral Sorrows" (instrumental)		Sami Nerberg	1:44
2.	"Darkday"	Andreas Axelsson	Axelsson	4:28
3.	"Living Hell"	Axelsson	Axelsson, Dan Swanö	4:19
4.	"Lost"	Swanö	Swanö	4:35
5.	"The Masque"	Axelsson, Swanö	Swanö	6:38
6.	"Blood of My Enemies" (Manowar cover)	Joey DeMaio	DeMaio	3:29
7.	"Jesus Cries"	Swanö	Axelsson, Swanö, Nerberg	4:49
8.	"Across the Fields of Forever"	Axelsson, Swanö	Axelsson, Swanö, Nerberg	6:07
9.	"On the Other Side"	Swanö	Swanö	5:43
10.	"Sacrificed"	Swanö	Swanö	3:51
11.	"Waiting to Die"	Swanö	Axelsson, Swanö	3:11
12.	"Feeding the Charlatan"	Axelsson, Benny Larsson	Axelsson, Larsson	2:45
13.	"A Serenade for the Dead" (instrumental)		Swanö	2:23
Total length:				54:02

== Personnel ==
Edge of Sanity

- Dan Swanö – vocals, piano, electric guitar
- Andreas Axelsson – electric guitar, bass guitar, vocals (on tracks 2, 7 & 12)
- Sami Nerberg – electric guitar
- Benny Larsson – drums, percussion

Production

- Dan Swanö – engineering, mixing
- Peter in de Betou – mastering
- Maren Lotz – layout, graphics
- Dan Seagrave – artwork
- Åsa Jonsén – photography
- Börje Forsberg – executive producer
