= Until Eternity Ends =

EP by Edge of Sanity
- Released: 1994
- Recorded: 1994
- Genre: Melodic death metal
- Length: 12:24
- Label: Black Mark
- Producer: Edge of Sanity

Edge of Sanity chronology
The Spectral Sorrows (1993)	Until Eternity Ends (1994)	Purgatory Afterglow (1994)

Professional ratings
Review scores
Source	Rating
Allmusic	link

Until Eternity Ends is the first and only EP by the Swedish death metal band Edge of Sanity, released by Black Mark Production in 1994. There are two versions of this EP, one has a blue and yellow cover in a standard box, the other has a red and black cover in a slim-line single box. It features three original songs and a cover of "Invisible Sun" by The Police.

The liner notes bear the following message: “These are four songs that we felt didn't fit the album that we are busy writing right now. But we like the songs and wanted them out somehow. This is not a taster of our upcoming CD! The fourth CD Purgatory Afterglow will take off where Unorthodox left! C-Ya (1994).”

The record was both remixed and remastered by Dan Swanö in 2024. Both new editions of the EP were released by Century Media on June 21, 2024.

== Track listing ==
No.	Title	Length
1.	"Until Eternity Ends"	4:02
2.	"Eternal Eclipse"	2:53
3.	"Bleed"	2:08
4.	"Invisible Sun" (The Police cover)	3:21
Total length:		12:24

== Personnel ==
- Dan Swanö − vocals, additional guitar, keyboards
- Andreas Axelsson − electric guitar, vocals (on "Bleed")
- Sami Nerberg − electric guitar
- Anders Lindberg − bass guitar
- Benny Larsson − drums, percussion
