= Nightwork (album) =

Studio album by Diabolical Masquerade
- Released: September 21, 1998
- Recorded: April 1998 at The Sanctuary
- Genre: Avant-garde metal, melodic black metal, progressive metal
- Length: 38:59
- Label: Avantgarde Music
- Producer: Dan Swanö, Blakkheim

Diabolical Masquerade chronology
The Phantom Lodge (1997)	Nightwork (1998)	Death's Design (2001)

Nightwork is the third studio album by the Swedish black metal band Diabolical Masquerade released in 1998 through Avantgarde Music.

== Track listing ==
No.	Title	Additional notes	Length
1.	"Rider on the Bonez"		5:54
2.	"Dreadventurouz"		5:46
3.	"The Zkeleton Keyz to the Dead"		5:17
4.	"Thiz Ghoultimate Omen"		4:33
5.	"All Onboard the Perdition Hearze!"		4:56
6.	"The Eerie Obzidian Circuz"		5:37
7.	"Haunted by Horror"		6:56
8.	"Cryztaline Fiendz"	LP reissue bonus track	1:49
Total length:			40:48

== Production details ==
- Produced by Dan Swanö with Blakkheim.
- Recorded, Mixed and Mastered at The Sanctuary April 1998.
- Album photo by Matthew Septimus / Photonic / Bulls.
- Blakkheim photo by Mala.
- Diabolical Masquerade logo by Blakkheim.
- Digital design and concept by Blakkheim and Sir Robert Graves (Greylife Research).
- All music, lyrics, and concepts written and arranged 1997 / 1998.
- Re-released by Peaceville Records in 2007 as a digipack. Comes with the bonus track Cryztalline Fiendz.

== Personnel ==
- Blakkheim : Guitars, vocals, bass, keyboards
- Dan Swanö : Drums and percussion, keyboards, effects, backing vocal

=== Additional personnel ===
- Ingmar Döhn : Cello, additional bass lines
- Marie Gaard Engberg : Flute
