= Crimson II =

Studio album by Edge of Sanity
- Released: August 26, 2003
- Recorded: May – July 2003
- Genre: Progressive death metal
- Length: 43:00; 41:24 (When All Is Said)
- Label: Black Mark
- Producer: Dan Swanö

Edge of Sanity chronology
Cryptic (1999)	Crimson II (2003)	When All Is Said (2006)

Professional ratings
Review scores
Source	Rating
Allmusic	3/5 stars

Crimson II is the eighth and final full-length studio album by Swedish death metal band Edge of Sanity and is a continuation of the storyline first heard on the album Crimson (1996). It is the only Edge of Sanity release that does not feature original members Andreas Axelsson and Benny Larsson. Opeth frontman Mikael Åkerfeldt, who provided vocals and guitar on the first album, also does not appear. Instead, it features contributions from guest musicians Mike Wead, Jonas Granvik, and brothers Roger and Simon Johannson.

Released during the advent of online music piracy, the album was indexed into over 40 track splits on the CD pressings, running from 18 seconds to a minute and a half, to discourage ripping and sharing (despite software like iTunes having the ability to rip groups of tracks as one file). When it was later released to digital stores and streaming services, the album was indexed into 11 tracks that are not all split according to the song movements. This caused the movement names to be extended with "Aftermath II" and "III" even though only the final track contains the movement itself. Neither Swanö nor label Black Mark Production have commented on why this is the case or why the edited version was used.

The album was remastered and edited for the compilation When All Is Said (2006) so it would fit on one CD along with the original Crimson. Full versions of both songs were used for a combined vinyl release in 2003. For this, the song was split in half, with side 2 picking up at "Achilles Heel." In 2011, the record was reissued on vinyl using the audio from the digital release as the source, with each track fading in and out at the exact times they do in the digital release.

The record was both remixed and remastered by Dan Swanö in 2025. Both new editions of the album were released by Century Media on August 8, 2025.

The album is dedicated to the memory of Death frontman Chuck Schuldiner.

== Track listing ==
While the album consists of one 43-minute-long song, it has nine movements.

All lyrics are written by Clive Nolan; all music is composed by Dan Swanö.

No.	Title	Length
1.	"Crimson II": I. "The Forbidden Words"; II. "Incantation"; III. "Passage of Time"; IV. "The Silent Threat"; V. "Achilles Heel"; VI. "Covenant of Souls"; VII. "Face to Face"; VIII. "Disintegration"; IX. "Aftermath"	43:00
Total length:		43:00

=== When All Is Said edition ===
The version featured in the When All Is Said compilation edits the track into eleven parts and removes certain segments to shorten the total runtime. All tracks fade in/out at the beginning/end, expect for the first and last tracks, which only feature fades at the end and beginning, respectively.

No.	Title	Length
1.	"The Forbidden Words" (actually "The Forbidden Words/Incantation I")	4:10
2.	"Incantation" (actually "Incantation II")	3:01
3.	"Passage of Time" (actually "Passage of Time I")	5:37
4.	"The Silent Threat" (actually "Passage of Time II")	4:26
5.	"Achilles Heel" (actually "The Silent Threat")	3:18
6.	"Covenant of Souls" (actually "Achilles Heel")	2:29
7.	"Face to Face" (actually "Covenant of Souls I")	3:11
8.	"Disintegration" (actually "Covenant of Souls II")	3:16
9.	"Aftermath I" (actually "Covenant of Souls III/Face to Face")	3:54
10.	"Aftermath II" (actually "Disintegration")	3:18
11.	"Aftermath III" (actually "Aftermath")	4:51
Total length:		41:31

=== Digital and 2025 editions ===
Digital releases of the record, as well as the 2025 remixed and remastered releases, feature splits similar to the ones seen in When All Is Said, plus restored segments that were cut out of the previous digital editions. The 2025 editions also removed the crossfades between tracks.

No.	Title	Length
1.	"The Forbidden Words" (actually "The Forbidden Words/Incantation I")	4:30
2.	"Incantation" (actually "Incantation II")	3:09
3.	"Passage of Time" (actually "Passage of Time I")	5:27
4.	"The Silent Threat" (actually "Passage of Time II")	4:24
5.	"Achilles Heel" (actually "The Silent Threat")	3:17
6.	"Covenant of Souls" (actually "Achilles Heel")	2:27
7.	"Face to Face" (actually "Covenant of Souls I")	3:11
8.	"Disintegration" (actually "Covenant of Souls II")	3:27
9.	"Aftermath I" (actually "Covenant of Souls III/Face to Face")	4:20
10.	"Aftermath II" (actually "Disintegration")	3:18
11.	"Aftermath III" (actually "Aftermath")	5:26
Total length:		42:56

== Personnel ==
- Dan Swanö − lead and backing vocals, all other instruments, production, mixing, engineering
- Roger Johansson − lead vocals
- Jonas Granvik − backing vocals
- Mike Wead − lead guitar, engineering
- Simon Johansson − lead guitar
