= Crimson (Edge of Sanity album) =

Studio album by Edge of Sanity
- Released: 2 April 1996
- Recorded: December, 1995 – January, 1996 Unisound and ProMix by Dan Swanö
- Genre: Melodic death metal, progressive death metal
- Length: 40:00; 38:33 (When All Is Said)
- Label: Black Mark
- Producer: Dan Swanö; Edge of Sanity

Edge of Sanity chronology
Purgatory Afterglow (1994)	Crimson (1996)	Infernal (1997)

Professional ratings
Review scores
Source	Rating
Allmusic	4/5 stars

Crimson is the fifth full-length studio album by Swedish death metal band Edge of Sanity, which is their first concept album and was released in 1996 by Black Mark Production. It features a single 40-minute track, telling a story in the distant future, when human civilization is about to end.

The album, which features Opeth frontman Mikael Åkerfeldt, received substantial critical acclaim, and is considered by most fans to be Edge of Sanity's finest achievement. A sequel, Crimson II, was released in 2003 and picks up directly where the first album left off. Both albums were remixed, edited and split to fit together on one CD for release on the 2006 compilation When All Is Said. Digital releases of the record feature nearly identical edits and splits.

While the album was originally pressed on vinyl upon release in 1996, it was later reissued with Crimson II as a double vinyl in 2003. This version splits the song in half, the parts running 18:38 and 21:04 respectively.

The record was both remixed and remastered by Dan Swanö in 2025. Both new editions of the album were released by Century Media on June 6, 2025.

== Narrative ==
The album's single song tells the story of a world where humans no longer can bear children. Into this time of despair a child is born to the King and Queen of the barren Earth. The Queen dies during childbirth, and the King is left to rule the Earth and raise his daughter on his own. The people think the child is a sign that God will give them back the ability to reproduce, but as the child grows into a teenager humanity remains infertile. In time, the King dies and men fight over his throne.

The new King crushes rebellions against his illegitimate rule and is generally hated by the populace. Eventually the Child is persuaded to lead a coup. As she is left alone to plan, the forces of evil beckon to her. She accepts an unholy Master and gains strong magical powers. She slays the false King easily and begins ruling Earth. The people watch her obsessively, because it was thought that by restoring the rightful ruler they might be returned the gift of breeding. But the new Queen misleads the people and slays the elders who the humans had preserved for their wisdom. Word of this gets out and a group of rebels gathers to stop her. They find a way to neutralize her power (by blinding her) and then place her in the same preservative tank of "crimson fluid" that the elders were kept in.

== Track listing ==
=== Original edition ===
No.	Title	Length
1.	"Crimson"	40:00
Total length:		40:00

=== Japanese edition ===
No.	Title	Length
1.	"Crimson"	40:00
2.	"Murder. Divided"	3:16
Total length:		43:16

=== When All Is Said edition ===
The version featured in the When All Is Said compilation edits the track into eight parts and removes certain segments to shorten the total runtime. All tracks fade in/out at the beginning/end, expect for the first and last tracks, which only feature fades at the end and beginning, respectively.

No.	Title	Length
1.	"Crimson, Pt. 1"	4:53
2.	"Crimson, Pt. 2"	4:24
3.	"Crimson, Pt. 3"	4:46
4.	"Crimson, Pt. 4"	2:27
5.	"Crimson, Pt. 5"	4:09
6.	"Crimson, Pt. 6"	5:59
7.	"Crimson, Pt. 7"	4:59
8.	"Crimson, Pt. 8"	6:56
Total length:		38:33

=== Digital and 2025 editions ===
Digital releases of the record, as well as the 2025 remixed and remastered releases, feature splits similar to the ones seen in When All Is Said, plus restored segments that were cut out of the previous digital editions. The 2025 editions also removed the crossfades between tracks.

No.	Title	Length
1.	"Crimson, Pt. 1"	4:54
2.	"Crimson, Pt. 2"	4:23
3.	"Crimson, Pt. 3"	4:57
4.	"Crimson, Pt. 4"	2:32
5.	"Crimson, Pt. 5"	4:09
6.	"Crimson, Pt. 6"	5:59
7.	"Crimson, Pt. 7"	4:59
8.	"Crimson, Pt. 8"	8:06
Total length:		40:00

== Credits ==
Edge of Sanity

- Dan Swanö − lead vocals, acoustic guitar, rhythm guitar (center channel), harmony guitar, keyboards
- Andreas Axelsson − rhythm guitar (right channel)
- Sami Nerberg − rhythm guitar (left channel)
- Anders Lindberg − bass guitar
- Benny Larsson − drums, percussion

Additional musicians

- Anders Måreby − cello
- Mikael Åkerfeldt − additional vocals, lead guitar

Production

- Lyrics written by Axelsson/Swanö January 1996
- Recorded and mixed in Unisound by Dan Swanö and ProMix 1 December 1995 to January 1996
- Mastered and digitally edited by Peter in de Betou & Dan Swanö in Cutting Room, Stockholm January 1996
- Cover artwork by Duncan C. Storr
- Cover concept by Dan Swanö
- Design and Layout by Maren Lotz
- Executive Producer: Börje Forsberg
- Promotion: Björn Schrenk
