= White Darkness (album) =

Studio album by Nightingale
- Released: February 26, 2007
- Studio: Various: Unisound (Örebro, Sweden); Stallet (Örebro, Sweden); Studio Brun (Stockholm, Sweden)
- Length: 45:37
- Label: Black Mark
- Producer: Dan Swanö

Nightingale chronology
Nightfall Overture (2005)	White Darkness (2007)	Retribution (2014)

Professional ratings
Review scores
Source	Rating
Encyclopaedia Metallum	(91%)

White Darkness is the sixth studio album by the Swedish rock band Nightingale, released by Black Mark Production in 2007.

The Chinese characters embossed on the digipak cover (永不放弃) means "never give up".

== Track listing ==
No.	Title	Lyrics	Music	Length
1.	"The Fields of Life"	Dan Swanö	Dag Swanö	4:22
2.	"Trial and Error"	Erik Oskarsson	Dag Swanö	4:54
3.	"One Way Ticket"	Dan Swanö	Dan Swanö; Dag Swanö	5:00
4.	"Reasons"	Erik Oskarsson	Dag Swanö	4:17
5.	"Wounded Soul"	Dan Swanö	Dan Swanö; Dag Swanö	3:39
6.	"Hideaway"	Tom Björn	Tom Björn	5:21
7.	"To My Inspiration"	Dan Swanö	Dag Swanö	3:59
8.	"White Darkness"	Dan Swanö	Dan Swanö (intro); Dag Swanö	5:16
9.	"Belief"	Dan Swanö	Dag Swanö	3:55
10.	"Trust"	Erik Oskarsson	Dag Swanö	5:03
Total length:				45:37

== Personnel ==
Nightingale

- Dan Swanö - guitars, lead vocals, keyboards
- Dag Swanö - guitar, backing vocals, keyboards
- Erik Oskarsson - bass guitar, backing vocals
- Tom Björn - drums, keyboards (on track 6)

Additional musician

- Thomas Lassar - synthesizers (on track 8), Hammond organ (on track 9)

Production

- Dan Swanö - engineering, mixing, mastering
- Erik Ohlsson - cover art, layout, band photography
