= Moontower =

Studio album by Dan Swanö
- Released: 25 January 1999
- Recorded: April 1998 at The Sanctuary
- Genre: Progressive death metal
- Length: 43:44
- Label: Black Mark
- Producer: Dan Swanö

Professional ratings
Review scores
Source	Rating
Allmusic	4/5 stars

Moontower is a solo studio album by Swedish extreme metal musician Dan Swanö, and so far his only solo album. A remaster was released in 2026.

The album has a death metal sound heavily influenced by progressive rock, similar to that of Opeth; Dan Swanö described the album as sounding like “If Rush played death metal in the 1970s”. The album cover is a close up of Swanö's own eye.

== Track listing ==
No.	Title	Length
1.	"Sun of the Night"	5:14
2.	"Patchworks"	4:59
3.	"Uncreation"	5:40
4.	"Add Reality"	6:17
5.	"Creating Illusions"	4:13
6.	"The Big Sleep"	5:17
7.	"Encounterparts"	6:06
8.	"In Empty Phrases"	5:58
Total length:		43:44

== Credits ==
- Dan Swanö – vocals, all instruments, producer, engineering, mixing

=== Additional personnel ===
- Peter in de Betou – mastering
- Anders Storm – photography, layout
