= The Breathing Shadow =

Studio album by Nightingale
- Released: 1995
- Studios: Unisound Studio in Finspång, Sweden
- Genres: Gothic rock; progressive rock; hard rock
- Length: 53:31
- Label: Black Mark
- Producer: Dan Swanö

Nightingale chronology
The Breathing Shadow (1995)	The Closing Chronicles (1996)

The Breathing Shadow is the first album by the Swedish rock band Nightingale. It was recorded and mixed within a week by Dan Swanö alone at his Unisound Studio; Nightingale did not yet exist as a band, and was simply a solo project by Swanö. This is the only album of Nightingale to use a drum machine (the other albums have Swanö or someone else on drums). The songs "Nightfall Overture" and "The Dreamreader" were re-recorded on the 2004 compilation album, Nightfall Overture.

== Track listing ==
No.	Title	Length
1.	"Nightfall Overture"	8:10
2.	"Sleep..."	4:40
3.	"The Dreamreader"	5:24
4.	"Higher Than the Sky"	6:15
5.	"Recovery Opus"	2:15
6.	"The Return to Dreamland"	3:04
7.	"Gypsy Eyes"	3:38
8.	"Alone?"	6:37
9.	"A Lesson in Evil"	5:53
10.	"Eye for an Eye"	7:22
Total length:		53:31

== Personnel ==
Nightingale

- Dan Swanö - vocals, all other instruments, mixing

Production

- Peter in de Betou - mastering
- Holger Stratmann - cover art, design, photography
- Börje Forsberg - Executive producer
