= Khaooohs =

Studio album by Pan.Thy.Monium
- Released: 1993
- Recorded: Unisound
- Genre: Avant-garde metal, progressive death metal
- Length: 44:13
- Label: Osmose Records
- Producer: Pan.Thy.Monium

Pan.Thy.Monium chronology
Dawn of Dreams (1992)	Khaooohs (1993)	Khaooohs and Kon-Fus-Ion (1996)

Khaooohs is the second album by band Pan.Thy.Monium. It was released in 1993.

== Track listing ==
1. "I Månens Sken Dog En Skugga" – 1:50
2. "Under Ytan" – 3:56
3. "Jag & Vem" – 5:54
4. "Lava" – 7:37
5. "Lömska Försåt" – 6:55
6. "I Vindens Våld" – 0:50
7. "Klieveage" – 2:48
8. "Ekkhoeece III" – 0:44
9. "Khaooohs I" – 4:47
10. "Utsikt" – 8:12
11. "Khaooohs II" – 0:40

== Personnel ==
- Robert Karlsson (credited as "Derelict") - vocals
- Benny Larsson (credited as "Winter") - drums, percussion, violin
- Dan Swanö (credited as "Day DiSyraah") - bass guitar, keyboards, sound effects
- Robert Ivarsson (credited as "Mourning") - rhythm guitar
- Dag Swanö (credited as "Äag") - lead guitar, organ, baritone saxophone

=== Production ===
- All tracks written by Day DiSyraah, Winter and Mourning
- Vocal parts written by Derelict
- Lead guitar and saxophone parts written by Äag
- Lyrics by Dr. Dark except "Klieveage" & "Ekkhoeece" by Pan-Thy-Monium
- "Khaoohs" by Derelict
- "I Månens Sken Dog En Skugga" and "I Vindens Våld" written and performed by Day DiSyraah
- "Khaoohs II" written and performed by Winter, Day DiSyraah and Derelict
- Produced by Pan-Thy-Monium & Raagoonshinnaah
- Recorded and mixed in Unisound studio by Day DiSyraah May 1993
- "Utsikt" recorded and mixed in Unisound studio by Day DiSyraah January 1993
- Drawings and Khaooohs logo by Annah
- Cover painting by Fritz Quasthoff
- 3d painting by Bo Lundstedt
- Re-released by Osmose Productions in '01, along with "Dawn of Dreams"
