= Diabolical Masquerade =

Swedish one-man black metal band

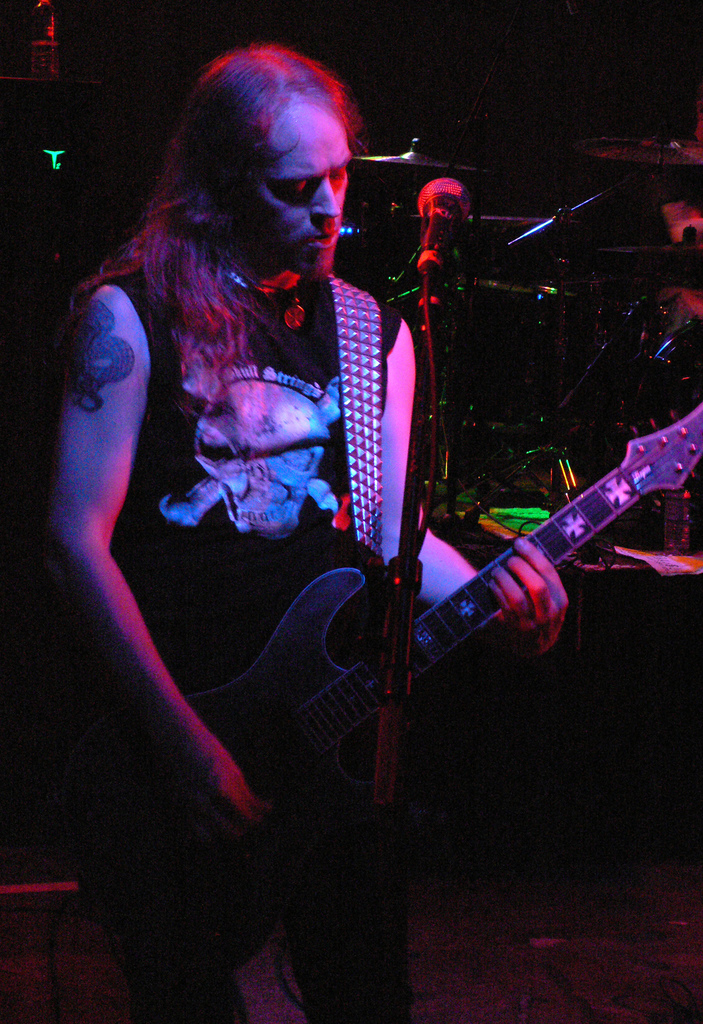
- Anders Nyström playing with Katatonia at Jaxx Nightclub in West Springfield, Virginia on September 4, 2007.

Background information
- Origin: Stockholm, Sweden
- Genres: Avant-garde metal, atmospheric black metal
- Years active: 1993–2004
- Labels: Adipocere, Avantgarde Music
- Members: Anders "Blakkheim" Nyström; Dan Swanö
- Website: diabolicalmasquerade.com

Diabolical Masquerade was a Swedish one-man black metal band with progressive influences. The band was formed in 1993 in Stockholm as a side project of Anders Nyström (a.k.a. Blakkheim), known as the guitarist of Katatonia.

== History ==
Diabolical Masquerade was a Swedish one-man black metal band. Katatonia guitarist Anders "Blakkheim" Nyström wrote and performed all music. He wanted to compose more extreme music while Katatonia explored more mellow moods. The music leans on avant-garde melodic black metal with death metal and thrash metal influences. Nyström wanted to experiment with song structure, themes, and composition. This is notable on the last Diabolical Masquerade album, Death's Design. This album was conceived as the soundtrack to a nonexistent horror movie, with 61 tracks broken up into 20 movements, each with a feel and theme. Death's Design includes passages featuring various genres and styles, experimenting with progressive rock, progressive metal, ambient, classical music, and rhythmic percussion-based passages. Nyström worked on the album with Dan Swanö. In early September 2004, Nyström announced that he had ended the project, lacking inspiration while working on a fifth album.

== Discography ==
Studio albums

- Ravendusk in My Heart (1996)
- The Phantom Lodge (1997)
- Nightwork (1998)
- Death's Design (2001)

Demo albums

- Promo 1993 (1993) (demo)

== Band members ==
Diabolical Masquerade

- Anders "Blakkheim" Nyström – vocals, guitar (1993–2004), bass, keyboards (1993–1998)
- Dan Swanö – keyboards (1996, 1998–2001), drums (1996, 1998), guest vocals (1997), backing vocals (1998), guitar (2001)
