= Invisible (Nightingale album) =

Studio album by Nightingale
- Released: 6 December 2004
- Studio: Studio Underground in Västerås, Sweden
- Length: 43:36
- Label: Black Mark

Nightingale chronology
Alive Again (2003)	Invisible (2004)	Nightfall Overture (2005)

Professional ratings
Review scores
Source	Rating
Encyclopaedia Metallum	(85%)

Invisible is the fifth full-length studio album by the Swedish rock band Nightingale. The track "Still Alive" is the end of the Breathing Shadow story. The rest of this album is not a concept/story album.

== Track listing ==
All lyrics are written by Dan Swanö, except "Still Alive" and "The Wake" written by Maxus Widar

No.	Title	Writer(s)	Length
1.	"Still Alive"	Swanö	4:38
2.	"Invisible"	Tom Nouga	3:38
3.	"A Raincheck on My Demise"	Nouga	3:43
4.	"Atlantis Rising"	Swanö	5:30
5.	"To the End"	Swanö	4:55
6.	"Misery"	Swanö	3:45
7.	"The Wake"	Swanö	5:12
8.	"One of the Lonely Ones"	Nouga	3:58
9.	"Worlds Apart"	Nouga	2:55
10.	"Stalingrad"	Nouga	5:19
Total length:			43:36

== Credits ==
=== Band members ===
- Dan Swanö: lead vocals, guitar
- Dag Swanö: backing vocals, guitar, keyboard
- Erik Oskarsson: backing vocals, bass guitar, co-lead vocals on "Atlantis Rising" and "Misery"
- Tom Björn: drums
