= The Closing Chronicles =

Studio album by Nightingale
- Released: 1996
- Genre: Gothic rock; progressive rock; hard rock
- Length: 42:28
- Label: Black Mark
- Producer: Dag Swanö

Nightingale chronology
The Breathing Shadow (1995)	The Closing Chronicles (1996)	I (2000)

Professional ratings
Review scores
Source	Rating
Allmusic	4/5 stars
Encyclopaedia Metallum	(89%)

The Closing Chronicles (subtitled: The Breathing Shadow II) is the second studio album by the Swedish rock band Nightingale, released by Black Mark Production in 1996. The album continues the story begun on The Breathing Shadow. This is the first album to feature Dag Swanö (with alias "Tom Nouga") on guitars and keyboards, as well as produce the album.

== Track listing ==
No.	Title	Length
1.	"Deep Inside of Nowhere"	7:12
2.	"Revival"	4:24
3.	"Thoughts from a Stolen Soul"	9:00
4.	"So Long (Still I Wonder)"	4:47
5.	"Steal the Moon"	3:17
6.	"Intermezzo"	4:22
7.	"Alive Again": "The Release"; "Shadowland Revisited"; "Breathless"	9:26
Total length:		42:28

== Credits ==
Nightingale

- Dan Swanö - vocals, guitars, keyboards, drums
- Dag Swanö - guitars, keyboards, bass guitar

Production and design

- Dag Swanö - producer
- Dan Swanö - engineering, mixing
- Peter In de Betou - mastering
- Juha Vuorma - cover art
- Maren Lotz - design, layout
- Anders Storm - photography
- Börje Forsberg - executive producer
