= Dawn of Dreams =

Studio album by Pan.Thy.Monium
- Released: 1992
- Genre: Avant-garde metal, progressive death metal
- Length: 44:57
- Label: Osmose Productions
- Producer: Pan.Thy.Monium

Pan.Thy.Monium chronology
| Dream II (1991) | Dawn of Dreams (1992) | Khaooohs (1993) |

Dawn of Dreams is the debut studio album by avant-garde/progressive/death metal band Pan.Thy.Monium released in 1992. Contrary to popular belief, the tracks do have intended titles, but Swanö instructed Osmose Productions not to release these titles (or any information about the band whatsoever) in the original pressing of the album, so for many years it was believed that the tracks were intended to be untitled. The official titles were not revealed until The Crypt's 2014 vinyl reissue of the album.

== Track listing ==
1. "RAAGOONSHINNAAH" – 21:49
2. "EEPITAFFPH" – 5:51
3. "SIEEGEH" – 4:03
4. "IV" – 3:06
5. "ZENOTAFFPH" – 2:42
6. "AMARAAH" – 4:26
7. "EKKHOECCE II" – 3:00

== Personnel ==
- Robert Karlsson (credited as "Derelict") - vocals
- Benny Larsson (credited as "Winter") - drums, percussion, violin
- Dan Swanö (credited as "Day DiSyraah") - bass guitar, keyboards, sound effects
- Robert Ivarsson (credited as "Mourning") - rhythm guitar
- Dag Swanö (credited as "Äag") - lead guitar, organ, baritone saxophone
