= Witherscape =

Swedish band

- Origin: Sweden
- Genres: Melodic death metal, progressive death metal
- Years active: 2013–present
- Label: Century Media Records
- Members: Ragnar Widerberg; Dan Swanö
- Website: www.witherscape.com

Witherscape is a progressive death metal band from Sweden run by multi-instrumentalists Dan Swanö and Ragnar Widerberg.

Witherscape released an album, The Inheritance, in 2013 which featured Eddie Risdal, Paul Kuhr, Joel Selsfors and Morten Jørgensen as musical guests.

Their most recent release is The Northern Sanctuary (2016).

== Members ==
- Ragnar Widerberg – guitar, bass (2013–present)
- Dan Swanö – vocals, keyboards, drums (2013–present)

== Discography ==
=== Albums ===
- The Inheritance (2013)
- The Northern Sanctuary (2016)

=== EPs ===
- The New Tomorrow (EP, 2014)
