= Nightingale (band) =

Swedish rock band

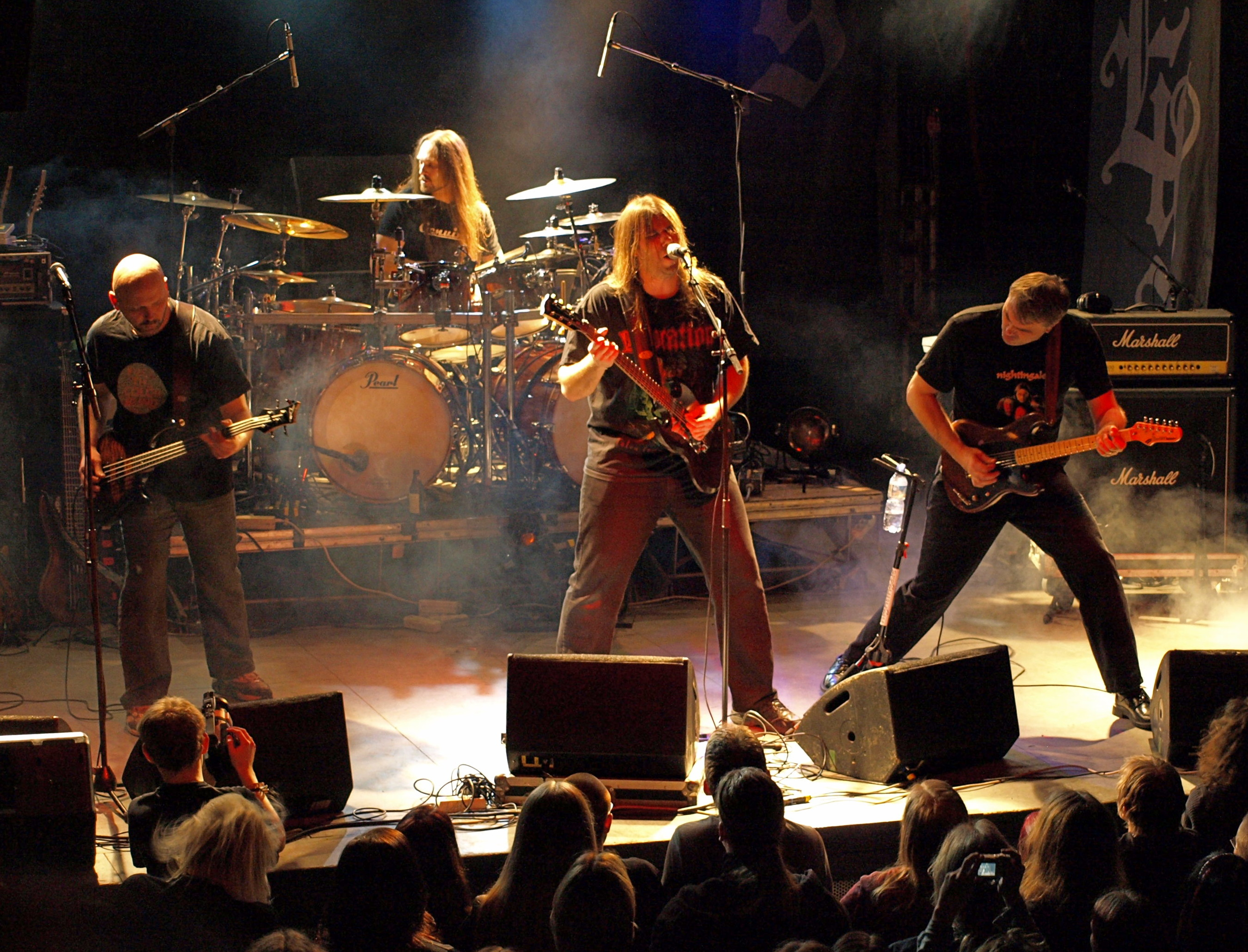
- Nightingale live at Nosturi, 2008 (left to right: Erik Oskarsson, Tom Björn, Dan Swanö and Dag Swanö)

Background information
- Origin: Örebro, Sweden
- Genres: Progressive rock; progressive metal; hard rock; gothic rock (early)
- Years active: 1994–present
- Labels: Inside Out; Black Mark
- Members: Dan Swanö; Dag Swanö (Tom Nouga); Tom Björn; Erik Oskarsson
- Website: Nightingale

Nightingale is a Swedish rock band from Örebro.

== History ==
Nightingale began in 1995 as a solo project of Dan Swanö, designed to explore his brief fascination with more of a cleanly-sung rock style evident on Edge of Sanity tracks such as "Sacrificed". The first album The Breathing Shadow was recorded and mastered by Swanö alone in the space of a week at his home Unisound studio, and has been described by some as a tribute to goth rock band The Sisters of Mercy. The second album The Closing Chronicles was recorded in April 1996 with his brother Dag acting as producer and contributing some guitar parts. Unlike the first album, it is somewhat influenced by progressive rock and heavy metal, and continues the conceptual storyline that began in The Breathing Shadow to the logical conclusion of the central characters' death, as it was intended to be the last Nightingale album.

After this the band went on semi-hiatus, playing a couple of live concerts in small venues around Örebro with future permanent band member Erik Oskarsson on bass and Ari Halinoja playing the drums. The second concert, in October 1998 is remarkable because it was one of the few times Edge of Sanity songs were performed live by Swanö, the band adding two lighter tracks to bulk out their set (Swanö scarcely performed live with Edge of Sanity, citing his inability to sustain death metal vocals for long enough).

The band returned to Unisound in April 1999 to expand upon a lost demo of the track "I Return" recorded by Dan and Dag in September 1998. The album "I" from 2000 is a prequel to the first two albums, half composed by Dan and half by Dag, several of the tracks, such as "Alonely" and "Dead or Alive" being recycled by Dag from previously abandoned projects and given new lyrics (the originals being both written in Swedish and outside the conceptual storyline). For the recording of "Alive Again" in May 2002 (a sequel to the original Breathing Shadow Trilogy of "I", "The Breathing Shadow" and "The Closing Chronicles") the band was filled out with Tom Björn on drums and Erik Oskarsson returning as a permanent member. This record received the most critical acclaim yet upon its release in February 2003, partly owing to the increased exposure caused by their signing of a distribution deal with American label The End Records. They played a series of live shows before travelling to Västerås in June 2004 to record Invisible, which is the band's first departure from their conceptual storyline approach, dealing with a wide array of topics from love to history. Before going on their first major tour, the band re-recorded a set of tracks for a best-of album, Nightfall Overture, containing songs from their first four conceptual albums, an Edge of Sanity track and one new Nightingale song.

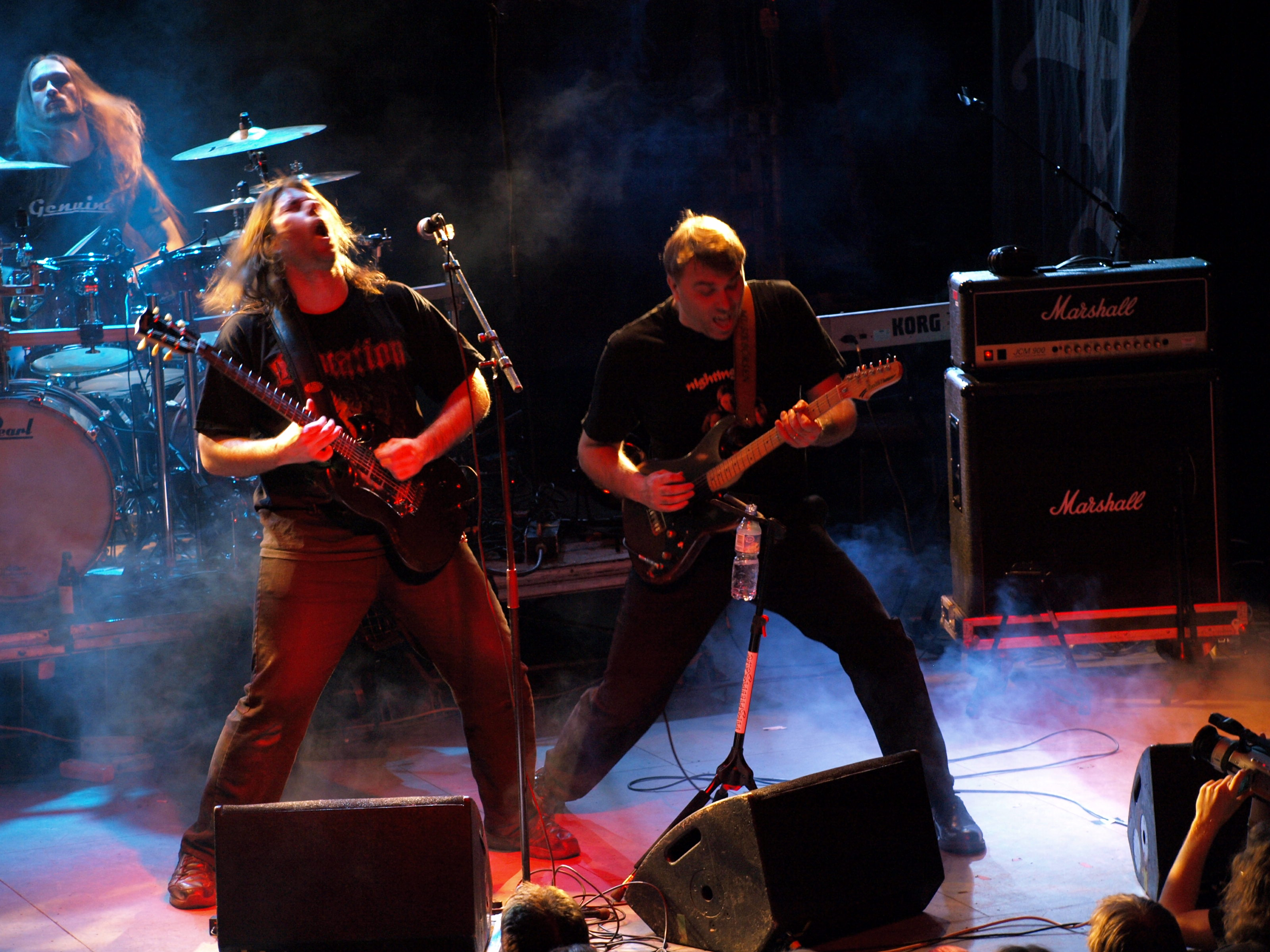
Dan and Dag Swanö live at Nosturi

In 2006 the band concluded the second and last day of the international progressive rock festival, InProg 2006.

Later that year Dag stated on his website that he will no longer be using his alias Tom Nouga;

In Sep-06 I decided to stop using the name Tom Nouga and play under my real name.

The band's sixth album White Darkness was released 4 June 2007.

On October 19, 2014, Nightingale released their seventh studio album entitled Retribution, a follow-up to 2007's White Darkness through the band's new worldwide label InsideOut Music on November 10, 2014 in Europe and January 25, 2015 in North America.

== Band members ==
- Dan Swanö – vocals, guitars, keyboards, drums, bass (1994–present)
- Dag Swanö (Tom Nouga) – guitars, keyboards, bass, backing vocals (1996–present)
- Tom Björn – drums (2000–present)
- Erik Oskarsson – bass, backing vocals (2000–present)

== Discography ==
- 1995 - The Breathing Shadow
- 1996 - The Closing Chronicles
- 2000 - I
- 2003 - Alive Again
- 2004 - Invisible
- 2005 - Nightfall Overture (Re-recorded versions of previously released songs)
- 2007 - White Darkness
- 2014 - Retribution
- 2017 - Rock Hard Live (Live album)
