= Alive Again (Nightingale album) =

Studio album by Nightingale
- Released: 28 January 2003
- Recorded: May – September 2002
- Studio: Various: Soundlab Studios in Örebro, Sweden; Studio Kuling in Örebro, Sweden; The Room in Sweden
- Genres: Progressive metal; melodic rock
- Length: 49:23
- Label: Black Mark

Nightingale chronology
| I (2000) | Alive Again (2003) | Invisible (2004) |

Professional ratings
Review scores
| Source | Rating |
|---|---|
| Allmusic | 3/5 stars |
| Lambgoat | 7/10 stars |
| BW&BK | 8.5/10 stars |
| Rock Hard | 7/10 stars |

Alive Again is the fourth full-length studio album by the Swedish rock band Nightingale.

This is the first release with Erik Oskarsson and Tom Björn in the band.

Alive Again continues the rock-oriented progressive metal direction of the band's first four albums and the conceptual saga that covers the albums of a character named "Shadowman". Subtitled "The Breathing Shadow, Part IV", it is the last album completely devoted to The Breathing Shadow story.

== Track listing ==
| No. | Title | Length |
|---|---|---|
| 1. | "Recollections" | 2:09 |
| 2. | "Shadowman" | 5:03 |
| 3. | "The Glory Days" | 4:16 |
| 4. | "Falling" | 3:25 |
| 5. | "Into the Light" | 3:58 |
| 6. | "Eternal" | 11:21 |
| 7. | "State of Shock" | 3:07 |
| 8. | "The One" | 3:47 |
| 9. | "Shadowland Serenade" | 5:54 |
| 10. | "Forever and Never" | 6:23 |
| Total length: | | 49:23 |

== Credits ==
Nightingale

- Dan Swanö : lead vocals, guitar
- Dag Swanö : backing vocals, guitar, keyboard
- Erik Oskarsson : backing vocals, bass guitar
- Tom Björn : drums
