= I (Nightingale album) =

Studio album by Nightingale
- Released: 12 September 2000
- Studio: Various: The Sanctuary in Örebro, Sweden; The Livingroom in Oslo, Norway; Thin Ice Studios in Virginia Water, Surrey, England
- Genres: Progressive rock, progressive metal
- Length: 43:12
- Label: Black Mark

Nightingale chronology
The Closing Chronicles (1996)	I (2000)	Alive Again (2003)

Professional ratings
Review scores
Source	Rating
Metal Reviews	88/100

I is the third full-length studio album by Swedish rock band Nightingale. The album is a prequel to The Breathing Shadow story from the first two albums.

== Track listing ==
No.	Title	Length
1.	"Scarred for Life"	3:58
2.	"Still in the Dark"	3:12
3.	"The Game"	4:29
4.	"Game Over"	3:06
5.	"Remorse and Regret"	5:02
6.	"Alonely"	4:15
7.	"I Return"	4:03
8.	"Drowning in Sadness"	3:32
9.	"Dead or Alive"	3:27
10.	"The Journey's End"	5:23
11.	"Breathing"	2:45
Total length:		43:12

== Credits ==
Nightingale

- Dan Swanö - vocals, rhythm guitar, keyboards, drums
- Dag Swanö - bass guitar, lead guitar, keyboards
