= Dream II =

EP by Pan.Thy.Monium
- Released: 1992
- Recorded: Gorysound
- Genres: Avant-garde metal Progressive death metal
- Length: 18:59
- Label: Obscure Plasma Records
- Producer: Pan.Thy.Monium

Pan.Thy.Monium chronology
| ...Dawn (1990) | Dream II (1992) | Dawn of Dreams (1992) |

Dream II is the first EP by avant-garde/progressive/death metal band Pan.Thy.Monium released in 1992.

== Track listing ==
1. "I" – 4:26
2. "II" – 3:31
3. "III" – 3:46
4. "Vvoiiccheeces" – 1:29
5. "IV" – 5:47

== Album information ==
- Recorded in Gorysound
- Everything vital created by Raagoonshinnaah
- Logo by Ghoobaah
- Artwork by Paw
- First press 7" vinyl only
- Re-released in 1995 by Avantgarde Music as Mini CD with IV as bonus track

== Personnel ==
- Derelict aka Robert "Robban" Karlsson - vocals
- Winter aka Benny Larsson - drums, percussion and violin
- Day DiSyraah aka Dan Swanö - bass, keyboards and effects
- Mourning aka Robert Ivarsson - rhythm guitars
- Äag aka Tom Nouga aka Dag Swanö - lead guitars, organ and baritone saxophone
