= Edge of Sanity =

Swedish death metal band

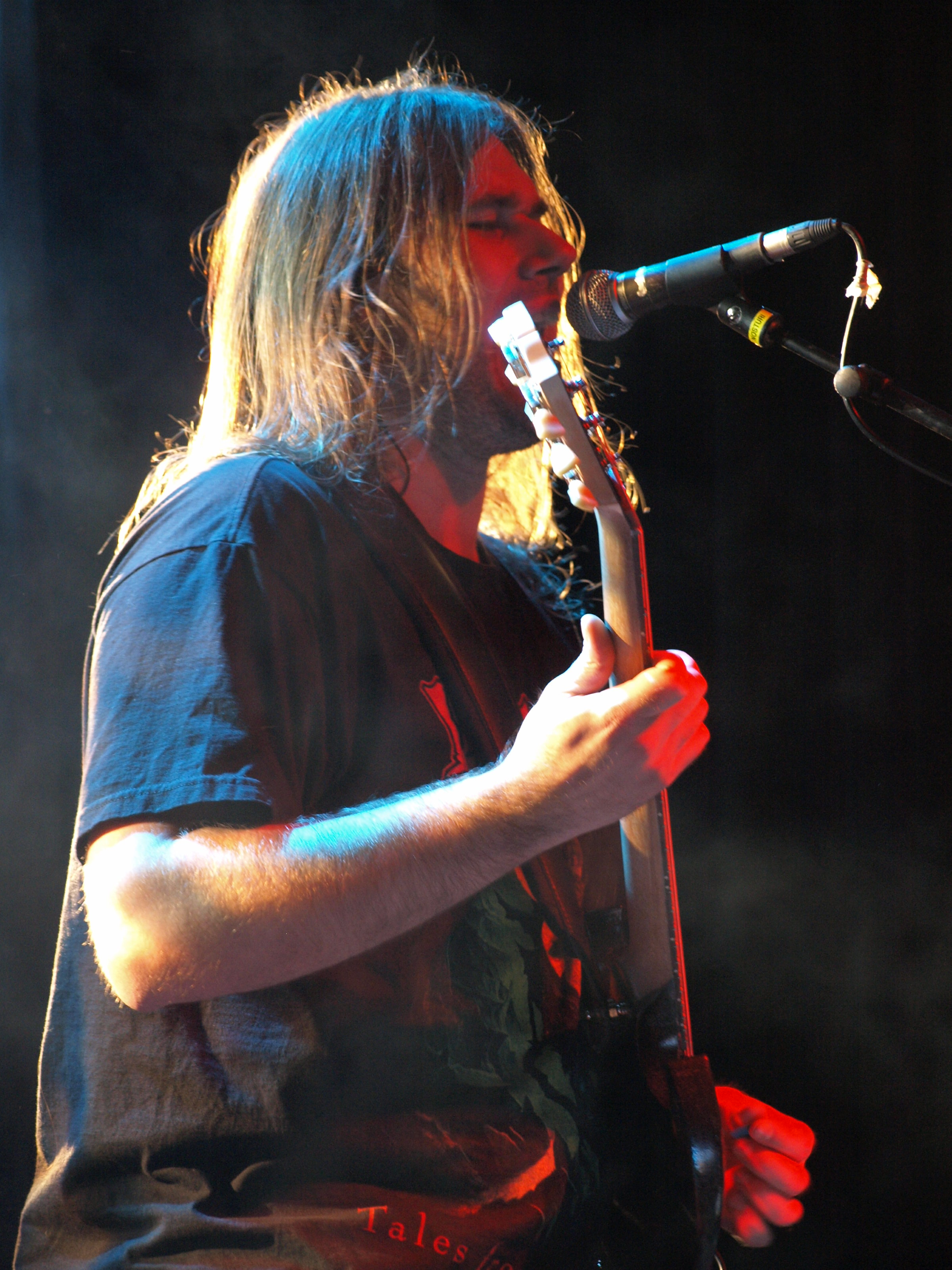
- Dan Swanö

Background information
- Origin: Finspång, Sweden
- Genres: Melodic death metal, progressive death metal, death metal (early)
- Years active: 1989–1999, 2003
- Label: Black Mark
- Past members: Dan Swanö; Andreas Axelsson; Sami Nerberg; Anders Lindberg; Benny Larsson; Robert Karlsson

Edge of Sanity was a Swedish death metal band that, alongside Opeth, is regarded as the first to fuse death and black metal with progressive rock. Vocalist Dan Swanö, guitarists Andreas Axelsson and Sami Nerberg founded the group, along with bassist Anders Lindberg and drummer Benny Larsson. For most of the band's career, Swanö and Axelsson were the main songwriters. Axelsson took over in 1997 after Swanö's departure, until the band first broke up in 1999. Swanö reactivated the project in 2003 as a one-man band, writing and releasing Edge of Sanity's final album, Crimson II, with the help of session musicians, then ended the project for the second and final time.

== History ==
Edge of Sanity began as a death metal band with their debut release, Nothing but Death Remains. The band's second release, Unorthodox, with tracks like "Enigma" and "When All Is Said", branched out from some of the genre's conventions and strove for a more progressive sound. With The Spectral Sorrows, Until Eternity Ends, and Purgatory Afterglow , the band continued towards longer and more melodic songs. By the release of Crimson in 1996, Edge of Sanity was a well-established progressive death metal band. Crimson was a one-track, 40-minute concept album concerning a post-apocalyptic future where mankind had lost the ability to breed.

After the release of Infernal in 1997, founder Dan Swanö left the band, citing creative differences with guitarist Andreas Axelsson. Following Swanö's departure, Axelsson hired Robert Karlsson, the vocalist of Pan.Thy.Monium, a side project in which Swanö was also involved, and released Cryptic in 1997. Despite efforts to keep the band running, they split up after the release of Cryptic.

In 2003, Swanö revived the outfit as a one-man band with several session musicians, and recorded a sequel to Crimson, Crimson II. Immediately after, he re-dissolved the project.

In 2011, Swanö re-released the Kur-Nu-Gi-A demo as a LP, and a CD edition of it in 2012.

In April 2024, Century Media Records and InsideOutMusic unveiled plans to reissue both remixed and remastered editions of the band's catalogue, reworked by Swanö. Along with the announcement, Century Media released a remix of "Twilight", from the band's 1994 album Purgatory Afterglow, plus a music video for the new track. The reissues were released in "chapters" throughout 2024 and 2025, along with remastered versions of Nightingale's records. In June 2024, Century Media released the first chapter of reissues, featuring Purgatory Afterglow as well as the band's only EP, 1994's Until Eternity Ends, along with a music video featuring the remastered version of "Black Tears".

== Members ==
=== Final line-up ===
- Dan Swanö – vocals (1989–1997, 2003), keyboards, piano (1991–1997, 2003), guitar (1993–1997, 2003), bass (1997, 2003), drums (2003)

=== Previous members ===
- Andreas Axelsson − guitar (1989–1999), bass (1993), vocals (1993-1994, 1997)
- Sami Nerberg − guitar (1989–1999)
- Anders Lindberg − bass (1989–1999)
- Benny Larsson − drums (1989–1999)
- Robert Karlsson − vocals (1997–1999)

== Discography ==
=== Albums ===
- Nothing but Death Remains (1991)
- Unorthodox (1992)
- The Spectral Sorrows (1993)
- Purgatory Afterglow (1994)
- Crimson (1996)
- Infernal (1997)
- Cryptic (1997)
- Crimson II (2003)

=== EPs ===
- Until Eternity Ends (EP, 1994)

=== Demos ===
- Euthanasia (1989)
- Kur-Nu-Gi-A (1990)
- The Dead (1990)
- The Immortal Rehearsals (1990)
- Dead but Dreaming (1991)
- Darkday (1993)
- Lost (1993)
- The Spectral Sorrows Demos (1993)
- Infernal Demos (1996)

=== Compilations ===
- Evolution (1999)
- When All Is Said (2006)
- Elegy - Chapter I (2025)
- Elegy - Chapter II (2026)

=== Videos ===
- "Black Tears" (1994) from Purgatory Afterglow
- "Uncontroll Me" (1997) from Cryptic
- Live in Norrköping 1991
