= Incision (band) =

Dutch hard rock band

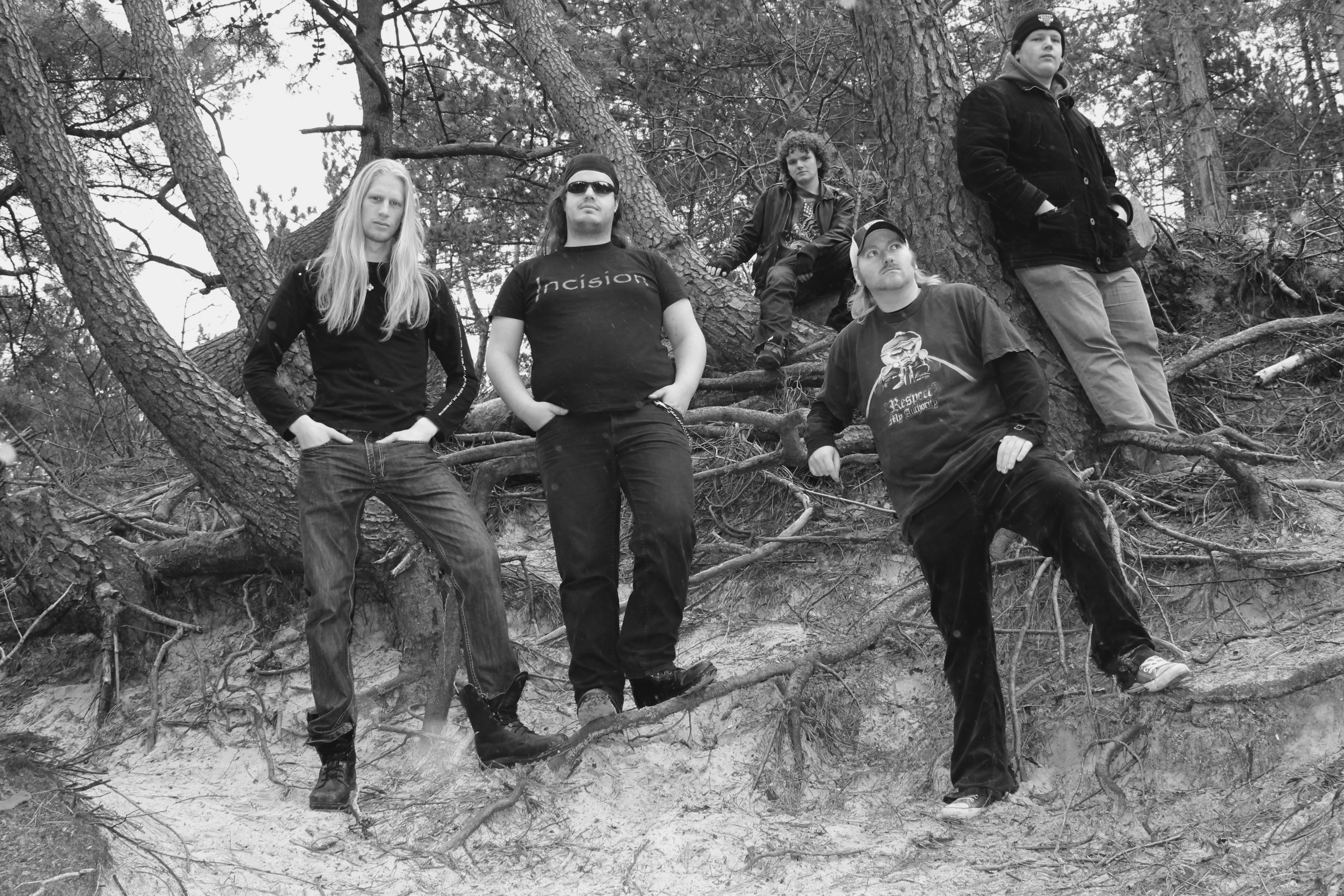
- 2013 Incision band photo

Background information
- Origin: Wogmeer, North Holland, Netherlands
- Genres: Hard rock
- Years active: 2008–2013
- Labels: Unsigned
- Members: Jesse Peetoom; Jeroen Beers; Roy Lust; Jim Snel
- Past members: Arnoud Corbee; Justin Reijnders; Timon Dik; Jason Bos; Wouter Ewalt; Daniel van Straalen; Samuel van Straalen
- Website: http://www.incision.eu

Incision is a Dutch hard rock band from Wogmeer, North Holland, that formed in February 2008.

== History ==
Incision started in February 2008, when four small town boys decided to start playing straight up classic hard rock. Some changes to the line-up the band occurred in 2009. They had their first gig in a local bar where the members performed live for the first time. Over the next few months the band performed all over the province North Holland (Netherlands). Mid-way through the year complications arose which resulted in the departures of some band members which left them stranded. The band continued to write songs and a new member was introduced to the group. During this period the band struggled to find a suitable lead vocalist, but eventually found one, and the band played several gigs throughout 2010.

2011 saw another line-up change as a result of musical differences. After an opportunity to open for Oliver/Dawson Saxon (UK), the band got booked throughout 2011 and people started to take notice of them and their new show and look. Half way through the year yet another member had been replaced. With a new member to strengthen the band they honed their performance and remained active for the remainder of the year. At the start of 2012 they recorded their first demo, which was released on March 3.

Throughout 2012 the band kept on touring but also began to write new material for on the road and future releases. With Roy on board as a full-time writer the band's style continued to evolve.

At the end of the year Incision was asked to perform on a benefit for a festival that was raising funds to help reduce infant deaths across the globe. After the completion of this gig Dani left the band.

== Members ==
=== Former members ===
- Arnoud Corbee - drums (2008)
- Justin Reijnders - vocals (2008–2009)
- Timon Dik - bass (2008–2009)
- Jason Bos - bass (2009–2010)
- Wouter Ewalt - guitar (2008–2011)
- Daniel van Straalen - bass (2011–2012)
- Samuel van Straalen - drums (2008–2013)
- Jesse Peetoom - vocals (2010–2013)
- Jeroen Beers - guitar, backing vocals(2008–2013)
- Roy Lust - guitar, backing vocals(2011–2013)
- Jim Snel - bass guitar, backing vocals, (2013–2013)

== Discography ==
Take Off! (Demo, 2012)
