= Pan.Thy.Monium =

Swedish avant-garde metal band

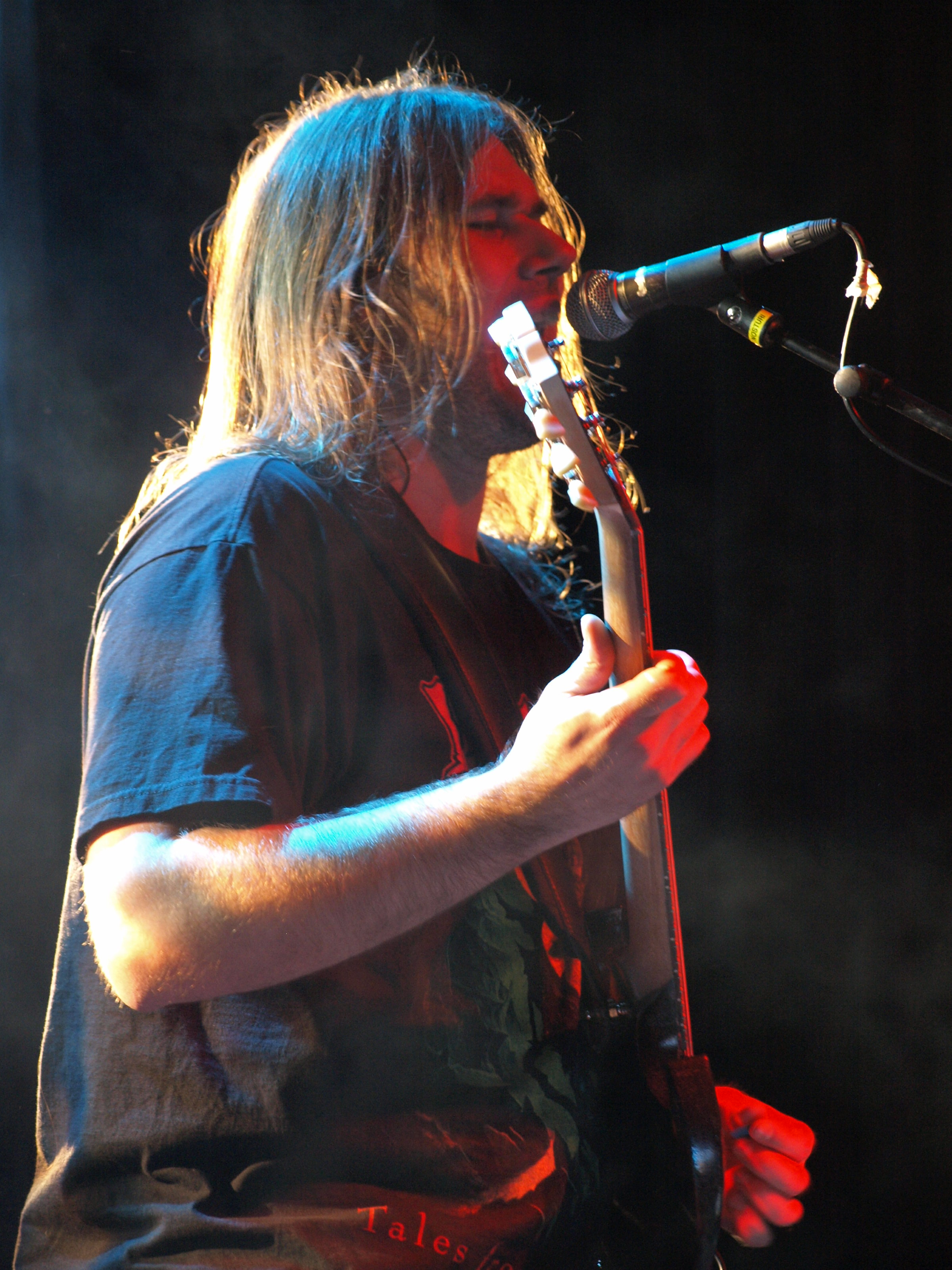
- Bassist/keyboardist Dan Swanö

Background information
- Origin: Finspång, Sweden
- Genres: Avant-garde metal, progressive death metal
- Years active: 1990–1996
- Label: Relapse
- Members: Derelict; Winter; Day DiSyraah; Mourning; Äag

Pan.Thy.Monium was a Swedish avant-garde metal band formed and led by Dan Swanö with several members from another project of his, Edge of Sanity. The group disbanded in 1996, after recording Khaooohs and Kon-Fus-Ion. The band wanted this last album to be a 3-disc puzzle.

== Last known line-up ==
- Derelict (Robert Karlsson): vocals
- Winter (Benny Larsson): drums, percussion, violin
- Day DiSyraah (Dan Swanö): bass, keyboards, effects
- Mourning (Robert Ivarsson): rhythm guitar
- Äag a.k.a. Tom Nouga (Dag Swanö): lead guitar, organ, baritone saxophone

== Discography ==
=== Demos ===
- ...Dawn (1990)

=== Albums ===
- Dawn of Dreams (1992)
- Khaooohs (1993)
- Khaooohs and Kon-Fus-Ion (1996)

=== EPs ===
- Dream II (1991)

=== Compilations ===
- Dawn of Dream+Khaooohs (2001)
- ...Dawn+Dream II (2010)
