= Unorthodox (Edge of Sanity album) =

Studio album by Edge of Sanity
- Released: July 8, 1992
- Recorded: December 1991 – January 1992
- Genre: Death metal
- Length: 57:35
- Label: Black Mark
- Producers: Rex Gisslén & Börje Forsberg

Edge of Sanity chronology
Nothing but Death Remains (1991)	Unorthodox (1992)	The Spectral Sorrows (1993)

Professional ratings
Review scores
Source	Rating
Allmusic	3/5 stars

Unorthodox is the second full-length studio album by the Swedish death metal band Edge of Sanity. It was recorded between December 1991 and January 1992 with Rex Gisslén and released by Black Mark on July 8, 1992.

Dan Swanö has claimed that this is his favorite Edge of Sanity album, and even went as far as to call it "perfect". Though primarily death metal, some tracks on this album present a shift toward more melodic sounds, a trend that would continue on 1993's The Spectral Sorrows. This is also the first Edge of Sanity album, as well as one of the first death metal records, to feature traditional heavy metal singing, which appear in the track "Enigma".

The record was both remixed and remastered by Dan Swanö in 2025. Both new editions of the album were released by Century Media on December 5, 2025.

== Track listing ==
No.	Title	Writer(s)	Length
1.	"The Unorthodox"	Andreas	0:38
2.	"Enigma": I: "The Blessing"; II: "Celestial Dissension"; III: "The Loss of Hallowed Life"	Andreas "Dread" Axelsson, Sami Nerberg, Dan Swanö	7:06
3.	"Incipience to the Butchery"	Nerberg, Swanö	2:00
4.	"In the Veins / Darker Than Black"	Axelsson, Nerberg, Swanö	4:42
5.	"Everlasting (Epidemic Reign Part III)"	Axelsson, Swanö	5:34
6.	"After Afterlife"	Sami Nerberg, Swanö	4:37
7.	"Beyond the Unknown"	Axelsson, Nerberg, Swanö	3:51
8.	"Nocturnal"	Axelsson, Nerberg, Swanö	5:36
9.	"A Curfew for the Damned (...Blind Belief)"	Axelsson, Nerberg, Swanö	4:31
10.	"Cold Sun (Epidemic Reign Part IV)"	Nerberg, Swanö	2:54
11.	"The Day of Maturity"	Axelsson	3:45
12.	"Requiscon by Pace" (Instrumental)		1:24
13.	"Dead But Dreaming"	Axelsson, Nerberg, Swanö	4:04
14.	"When All Is Said"	Pellow, Swanö	6:53
Total length:			57:35

Japanese edition bonus track
No.	Title	Writer(s)	Length
15.	"Human Aberration"	Edge of Sanity	3:41
Total length:			61:16

=== 2025 remastered edition ===
The 2025 remastered release of the record features the Japanese edition bonus track "Human Aberration" and a slightly altered track list.

No.	Title	Writer(s)	Length
1.	"The Unorthodox"	Andreas	0:38
2.	"Enigma": I: "The Blessing"; II: "Celestial Dissension"; III: "The Loss of Hallowed Life"	Andreas "Dread" Axelsson, Sami Nerberg, Dan Swanö	7:04
3.	"Incipience to the Butchery"	Nerberg, Swanö	1:58
4.	"In the Veins / Darker Than Black"	Axelsson, Nerberg, Swanö	4:41
5.	"Everlasting"	Axelsson, Swanö	5:32
6.	"After Afterlife"	Sami Nerberg, Swanö	4:29
7.	"Nocturnal"	Axelsson, Nerberg, Swanö	5:32
8.	"A Curfew for the Damned"	Axelsson, Nerberg, Swanö	4:29
9.	"Cold Sun"	Nerberg, Swanö	2:53
10.	"Requiscon by Pace" (Instrumental)		1:25
11.	"Dead But Dreaming"	Axelsson, Nerberg, Swanö	4:03
12.	"When All Is Said"	Pellow, Swanö	6:52
13.	"Beyond the Unknown"	Axelsson, Nerberg, Swanö	3:50
14.	"The Day of Maturity"	Axelsson	3:43
15.	"Human Aberration"		3:34
Total length:			60:48

=== 2025 remixed edition ===
The 2025 remix of the record features fewer tracks than either the original or remastered versions. This is due to Dan Swanö being unable to find the original master tapes that included "A Curfew for the Damned", "Requiscon by Pace", "The Day of Maturity" and "Beyond the Unknown". The track "Requiscon by Pace" was re-recorded by Swedish musician Anders Måreby, and its name was corrected to the actual Latin phrase "Requiescat in Pace", meaning rest in peace.

No.	Title	Writer(s)	Length
1.	"The Unorthodox"	Andreas	0:38
2.	"Enigma": I: "The Blessing"; II: "Celestial Dissension"; III: "The Loss of Hallowed Life"	Andreas "Dread" Axelsson, Sami Nerberg, Dan Swanö	7:04
3.	"Incipience to the Butchery"	Nerberg, Swanö	1:58
4.	"In the Veins / Darker Than Black"	Axelsson, Nerberg, Swanö	4:38
5.	"Everlasting"	Axelsson, Swanö	5:28
6.	"After Afterlife"	Sami Nerberg, Swanö	4:35
7.	"Nocturnal"	Axelsson, Nerberg, Swanö	5:30
8.	"Human Aberration"		3:34
9.	"Requiescat in Pace" (Instrumental)	Nerberg, Swanö	1:11
10.	"Cold Sun"	Nerberg, Swanö	2:50
11.	"Dead But Dreaming"	Axelsson, Nerberg, Swanö	4:02
12.	"When All Is Said"	Pellow, Swanö	6:33
Total length:			48:01

== Personnel ==
Edge of Sanity

- Dan Swanö − vocals, piano
- Andreas Axelsson − electric guitar
- Sami Nerberg − electric guitar
- Anders Lindberg − bass guitar
- Benny Larsson − drums, percussion

Guest musicians

- Yasmina Molero – backing vocals (on "Enigma")
- Anders Mareby − classical guitar, cello

Production

- Mattias Axelsson – photography
- Bart Meganck – cover art
- Lasse Hoile – logo art
- Gunnar Swanö – logo art
- Boss – executive producer
- Rex Gisslén – engineering, mixing
- Dread – logo art concept
- Dan Swanö – mixing
- Dogger Tralce – drawing
