= Andreas Axelsson =

- Also known as: Drette, Dread
- Origin: Finspång, Sweden
- Genres: Progressive metal, death metal, black metal, punk rock
- Instruments: Vocals, guitar, bass
- Years active: 1988–present
- Member of: Disfear
- Formerly of: Edge of Sanity, Marduk

Andreas Axelsson is a Swedish musician, best known as a guitarist in progressive death metal band Edge of Sanity. Edge of Sanity was formed in 1989 by Dan Swanö and Axelsson, who would remain together in the band from its inception until 1997, when Swanö left due to creative differences. Axelsson continued Edge of Sanity, releasing an album in the same year and continuing to tour until 1999. In 1996, Edge of Sanity released Crimson, which became notable for its single 40-minute track.

Before joining Edge of Sanity, Axelsson was the singer in black metal band Marduk, though he only appeared on their first release, Dark Endless. In 2014, he joined Disfear playing bass. In 2016, Axelsson joined with Tomas Lindberg, Adrian Erlandsson, and Fredrik Wallenberg to launch supergroup, The Lurking Fear.

== Music ==
- Disfear – bass (2014–)
- Edge of Sanity – guitars (1989–1999), bass (1993), vocals (1993, 1997)
- Infestdead – vocals (1996–2007)
- Marduk – vocals (1990–1993)
- Incapacity – vocals
- Total Terror – vocals, guitar
- Tortyr – guitar
- Tormented – vocals, guitar
- Necronaut – vocals
- The Dontcares - bass, vocals, nudeness
- The Deadbeats – Vocals, guitar
- The Long Way Home
