= Dan Swanö =

Swedish musician (born 1973)

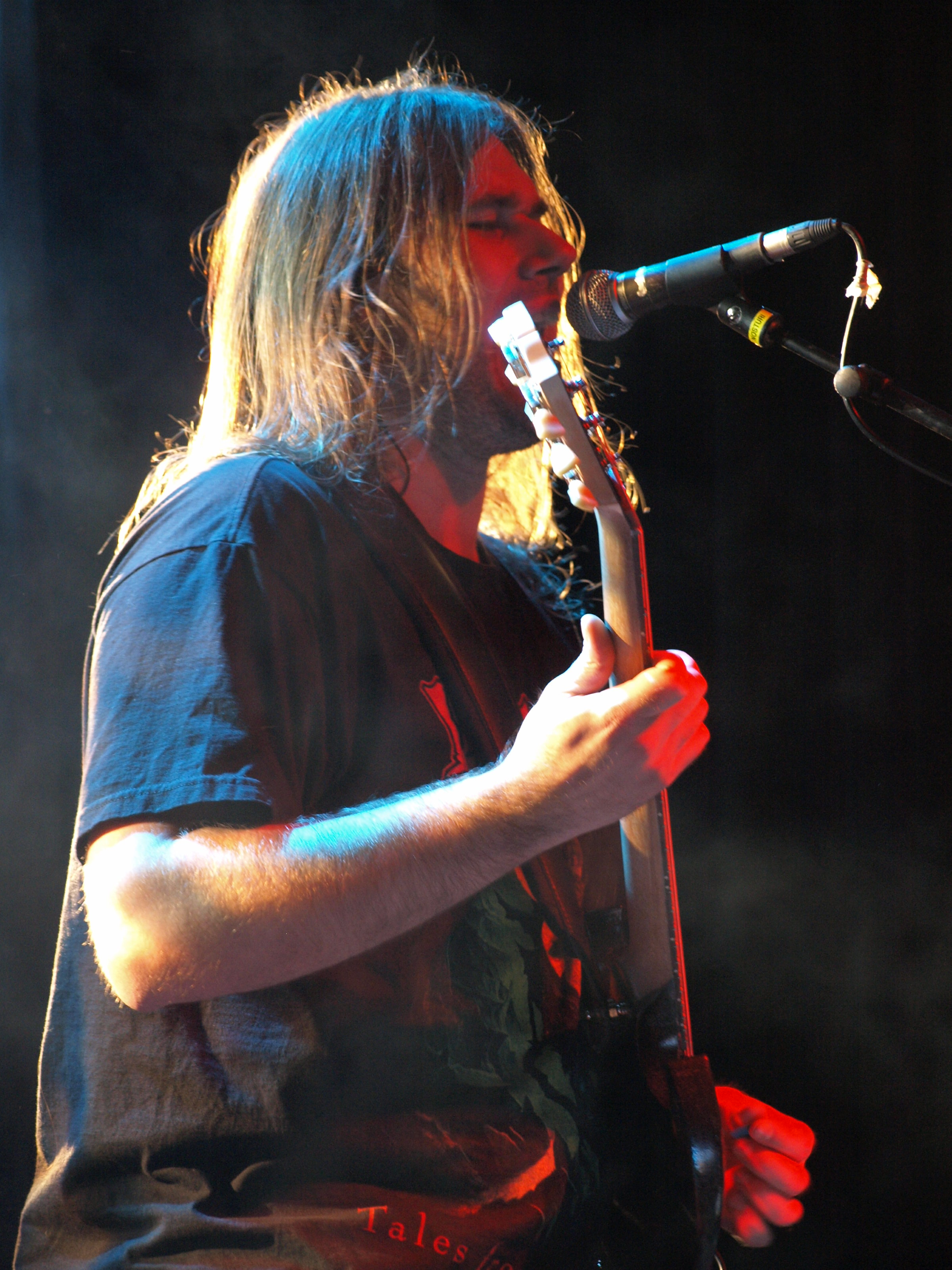
- Swanö live at Nosturi 2008

Background information
- Also known as: Day DiSyraah
- Born: 10 March 1973 (age 53); Finspång, Sweden
- Origin: Örebro, Sweden
- Genres: Progressive rock; death metal; gothic rock
- Instruments: Vocals, guitar, bass, keyboards, drums, percussion
- Years active: 1988–present
- Label: Black Mark
- Member of: Nightingale, Witherscape
- Formerly of: Therion, Edge of Sanity, Bloodbath, Katatonia, Opeth, Ribspreader, Millencolin, Marduk, Threshold, Star One

Dan-Erland Swanö (born 10 March 1973), also known as Dan "The Man" Swanö, is a Swedish musician and record producer who is currently the vocalist, guitarist, ex-bassist and ex-drummer for the band Nightingale, lately vocalist, keyboardist and drummer for the band Witherscape, as well as the owner of Unisound. He achieved fame as the vocalist and songwriter of progressive death metal band Edge of Sanity.

As a multi-instrumentalist he is regarded as influential in the underground melodic death metal, black metal, progressive metal, death metal, progressive rock, and power metal communities. He is known for his progressive rock-influenced songwriting style and his frequent use of both clean and growled vocals.

== Career ==
Swanö has fronted a number of bands, including Edge of Sanity, Brejn Dedd, Unicorn, Infestdead and Route Nine. He has also been a member of Katatonia and Ribspreader, as well as playing drums and lead guitar in death metal band Bloodbath.

Swanö also participated in Steel, a one-off power metal project from Sweden that featured him and members of Opeth. Started in 1996, this collaboration emerged during the recording sessions for Opeth's Morningrise album. During a jam session, when the band were soundchecking the drums, they hit upon an idea to record a short piece for fun, entitled "Guitars and Metal". This gave birth to Steel. Subsequently, they were asked to record more songs, and when they did, the songs which were originally meant for a demo, actually appeared on a limited picture 7-inch EP titled Heavy Metal Machine, released by Near Dark Productions. To this date, it remains their sole record. Featuring only two songs, Heavy Metal Machine sounds very much like a typical 1980s power metal band, with high-pitched vocals, shredding solos, pounding bass lines and 1980s-style sound effects (police sirens, etc.). However, the record is not meant to be taken as a serious power metal attempt, explaining Swanö's extremely high-pitched vocals. As a limited release, Heavy Metal Machine remains a collector's item and is hard to come by.

He has also contributed his vocal talents to Arjen Lucassen's Star One project. The two musicians are good friends, with Lucassen contributing guitar parts to Swanö's Nightingale project. Swanö can also be heard on the albums Theli and A'arab Zaraq – Lucid Dreaming by the symphonic metal band Therion. He was a producer and contributing writer of the band Diabolical Masquerade, the now-defunct solo avant-garde black metal band of Anders Nyström a.k.a. Blakkheim (Katatonia, Bloodbath, ex-Bewitched). He also contributed some guitar solos, backing vocals on various Diabolical Masquerade albums, and played the drums on the album Nightwork. He also produced and played the keyboards on the Memories from Nothing album by Swedish rock band Another Life, released on Vic Records.

Swanö has also released a solo progressive death metal album entitled Moontower, on which he plays all instruments (guitar, bass, drums, keyboard) as well as providing all the vocal work.

In July 2007, he auditioned to be lead singer for the Israeli project Amaseffer but lost the part to Mats Levén.

During 2009, Swanö re-activated Odyssey, this time performing all instruments by himself. Swanö recorded seven of his all-time favourite songs which was released in November 2010 on the album Reinventing the Past, together with the three 1999 tracks as a bonus on Vic Records. His brother Dag played guest lead guitar on the song "Gypsy", a Uriah Heep cover.

In 2013, Swanö released with his new project Witherscape the full studio album The Inheritance, with Ragnar Widerberg as co-member, and the collaboration of, amongst other guest musicians, Novembers Doom's founder Paul Kuhr. It was followed a year after by the EP The New Tomorrow. In 2016, the full studio album The Northern Sanctuary was released, via Century Media Records like its predecessors, featuring once again Paul Kuhr.

Swanö has a diverse vocal register, encompassing many styles, which include death growls; clean, melodic singing with a warm tone; dark gothic vocals; and thrash shouting. As a peculiarity, he is a left-handed guitarist, but plays on right-handed guitars without reversing the strings.

In December 2020 Swanö was a guest on episode 8 of the podcast "Wir und ELANE", hosted by members of the German band Elane. He spoke about several band experiences, the creation process of the first Nightingale album and the project which was called "Second Sky".

=== Unisound Studio ===
Unisound Studio (also Unisound Recordings or Gorysound Studio) is a recording studio owned and operated by Dan Swanö. It used to be in Finspång, Sweden, but was closed down in around 2001 because of his family. The studio was later relocated into Swanö's home in Örebro.

== Family and work ==
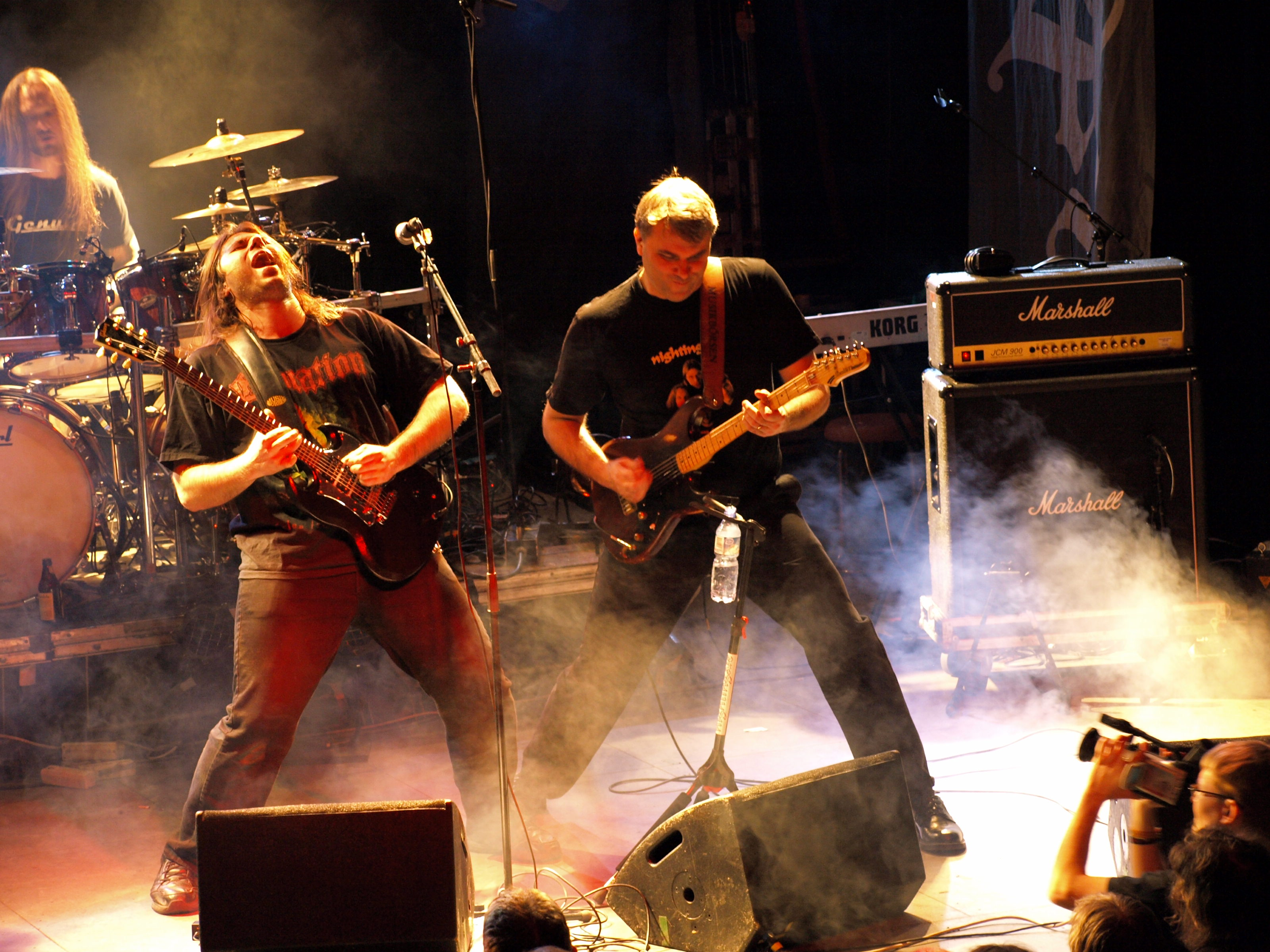
Swanö with his brother Dag, 2008

Despite the large amount of releases to his name, Swanö worked full-time in a music store (Musikbörsen) in Örebro, near his home in Sweden, rarely doing live performances with any of his bands. He has an older brother, Dag, who plays guitars and keyboards in Nightingale, formerly under the name of "Tom Nouga".

== Musical contributions ==
Bands	Audio engineering	Audio mastering	Audio mixing	Backing vocals	Bass guitar	Drum kit	Electric guitar	Electronic keyboard	Former member	Member	Other Instruments	Record producer	Vocals
Aeon		✓	✓										
Aephanemer			✓								✓		
Altar				✓				✓					
Ancient	✓		✓	✓				✓				✓	
Ancient Ascendant		✓		✓									
Another Life						✓	✓	✓					
Another Perfect Day													✓
Argentum							✓						✓
As Light Dies		✓				✓						✓	
Battlelore		✓	✓									✓	
Bloodbath	✓			✓	✓	✓	✓	✓	✓			✓	
Bombshell Rocks								✓					
Brëjn Dëdd						✓			✓				✓
Bucovina		✓	✓										
Canopy							✓						✓
Coldworker												✓	
Coraxo		✓											
Cronian		✓											
Dark Funeral												✓	
Darkcide					✓		✓						✓
Darkified							✓	✓	✓				
Dawn	✓												
Dawn of Dreams		✓											✓
De Infernali													✓
Demiurg							✓	✓		✓			
Demon Project													✓
Denial		✓											
Diabolical Masquerade						✓	✓	✓				✓	✓
Dissection	✓												
Edge of Sanity	✓	✓	✓	✓	✓	✓	✓	✓	✓	✓		✓	✓
Effloresce		✓	✓										
Entrails		✓	✓	✓									✓
Evergrey		✓	✓										
Evocation												✓	
Evoke												✓	
Fall of Serenity												✓	
Fleshcrawl												✓	
Fractal Gates		✓	✓										✓
Frameshift													✓
Gates of Ishtar								✓					
Ghost						✓							
Ghostorm				✓								✓	✓
Godsend								✓	✓				✓
Gravecarver		✓	✓										
Gorath		✓											
Hail of Bullets												✓	✓
Hallows Die		✓											
Hearse		✓											
Incision					✓		✓						✓
Infestdead					✓	✓		✓					
Insomnium			✓										
Kaoteon		✓											
Karaboudjan	✓	✓	✓	✓	✓	✓	✓	✓	✓	✓		✓	✓
Katatonia				✓		✓		✓					
Lay Down Rotten		✓	✓										✓
Maceration				✓				✓					✓
M.E.S.S.		✓	✓										
Mahlstrøm													✓
Marduk			✓										
Masticate					✓		✓		✓			✓	
Mechanization		✓											
Millencolin												✓	
Mirrors of Obsidian		✓											
Moredhel												✓	
Mörk Gryning												✓	
Motorowl		✓	✓										
MyGrain		✓	✓										
Nasum		✓										✓	
Necrochamber		✓	✓										
Nightingale	✓	✓			✓	✓	✓	✓				✓	✓
Novembers Doom			✓				✓						
Novembre												✓	
Nårdegaist		✓											
Oddland		✓	✓										
Odyssey					✓	✓		✓				✓	✓
Omnium Gatherum		✓	✓	✓								✓	
Opeth	✓		✓									✓	
Overflash						✓							
Pain	✓												
Pan.Thy.Monium					✓			✓					
Proserpine													✓
Rakshasas		✓											
Ribspreader						✓	✓			✓			
Route Nine					✓		✓	✓	?	?		✓	
Rytmihäiriö		✓	✓										
Scartown		✓											
Somnae		✓											
Sörskogen					✓	✓		✓	✓				
Star One				✓								✓	✓
Steel									✓			✓	
Subway Mirror							✓					✓	
The Foreshadowing		✓	✓										
Theatre of Tragedy	✓		✓								✓		
Therion												✓	
Threshold												✓	
Torture Division												✓	
Total Death		✓	✓	✓								✓	
Total Terror							✓		✓			✓	
Uncanny	✓												
Under Black Clouds	✓		✓				✓					✓	
Vinterland								✓				✓	
Wake Arkane													✓
Winds												✓	
Witherscape	✓	✓	✓	✓		✓	✓	✓		✓		✓	✓
Wounded Knee												✓	✓

=== Discography ===
Year	Bands	Title	Instruments					Notes
1985	Ghost	Djävulstriangeln	Vocals			Drums		Demo
1986	Ghost	Hollywood	Vocals			Drums		Demo
1987	Ghost	Solens Söner	Vocals			Drums		Demo
1988	Brejn Dedd	First Demo	Backing vocals			Drums		Demo
1988	Brejn Dedd	Ugly Tapez	Backing vocals			Drums		Demo
1989	Brejn Dedd	Born Ugly	Backing vocals			Drums		Demo
1989	Edge of Sanity	Euthanasia	Vocals					Demo
1989	Unicorn	A Collection of Worlds, Part I	Vocals			Drums		Demo
1989	Unicorn	A Collection of Worlds, Part II	Vocals			Drums		Demo
1990	Masticate	Desecration	Vocals	Guitars	Bass			Demo
1990	Stygg Död	Välkommen till Helvetet	Vocals		Bass			Demo
1990	Stygg Död	666+Våld	Vocals		Bass			Demo
1990	Pan.Thy.Monium	...Dawn		Lead Guitars	Bass		Keyboards	Demo
1990	Ulan Bator	Gummicancer	Backing vocals			Drums		Demo
1990	Incision	Perverted Possessions	Vocals			Drums		Demo
1990	Edge of Sanity	Kur-Nu-Gi-A	Vocals	Add. Guitar			Keyboards	Demo
1990	Edge of Sanity	The Dead	Vocals					Demo
1990	Edge of Sanity	The Immortal Rehearsals	Vocals					Demo
1990	Deppdöden	Titta först på när jag dansar				Drums		EP
1990	Wounded Knee	Searching	Backing vocals			Drums		EP
1990	Ulan Bator	På Rätt Spår	Backing vocals			Drums		EP
1990	Subway Mirror/O(:the circle)	Prime	Vocals	Guitars				Demo
1991	Pan.Thy.Monium	Dream II		Lead Guitars	Bass		Keyboards	EP
1991	Incision	Infest Incest	Vocals			Drums		EP, Unreleased
1991	Edge of Sanity	Dead but Dreaming	Vocals	Add. Guitar			Keyboards	Demo
1991	Edge of Sanity	Nothing But Death Remains	Vocals	Add. Guitar			Keyboards	Studio
1991	Subway Mirror/O(:the circle)	Golliwog	Vocals	Guitars				Demo
1991	Unicorn	The Weirdest of Tales	Vocals			Drums		Demo
1991	Wounded Knee	Feelings	Backing vocals			Drums		Studio
1992	Edge of Sanity	Unorthodox	Vocals	Add. Guitar			Keyboards	Studio
1992	Pan.Thy.Monium	Dawn of Dreams		Lead Guitars	Bass		Keyboards	Studio
1992	Maceration	A Serenade of Agony	Vocals				Keyboards	Studio
1992	Route Nine	Disrupted Vacancy	Vocals		Bass	Drums	Keyboards	Demo
1992	Subway Mirror/O(:the circle)	RaQ	Vocals	Guitars				Demo
1992	Unicorn	After Before	Vocals			Drums		Demo
1992	Godsend	Demo 92	Vocals				Keyboards	Demo
1993	Edge of Sanity	The Spectral Sorrows	Vocals	Add. Guitar			Keyboards	Studio
1993	Route Nine	Before I Close My Eyes Forever	Vocals		Bass	Drums	Keyboards	EP
1993	Pan.Thy.Monium	Khaooohs		Lead Guitars	Bass		Keyboards	Studio
1993	Unicorn	Ever Since	Vocals			Drums		Studio
1993	Subway Mirror/O(:the circle)	Jpp	Vocals	Guitars				Demo
1993	Godsend	As the Shadows Fall	Vocals				Keyboards	Studio
1994	Edge of Sanity	Until Eternity Ends	Vocals	Add. Guitar			Keyboards	EP
1994	Edge of Sanity	Purgatory Afterglow	Vocals	Add. Guitar			Keyboards	Studio
1995	Unicorn	Emotional Wasteland	Vocals			Drums		Studio
1995	Nightingale	The Breathing Shadow	Vocals	All Instruments				Studio
1996	Edge of Sanity	Crimson	Vocals	Add. Guitar			Keyboards	Studio
1996	Nightingale	The Closing Chronicles	Vocals	Guitars		Drums	Keyboards	Studio
1996	Infestdead	Killing Christ		Guitars		Drum-programming		EP
1996	Pan.Thy.Monium	Khaooohs and Kon-Fus-Ion		Lead Guitars	Bass		Keyboards	Studio
1997	Edge of Sanity	Infernal	Vocals	Add. Guitar			Keyboards	Studio
1997	Infestdead	Hellfuck		Guitars	Bass	Drum-programming	Keyboards	Studio
1997	Godsend	A Wayfarers Tears	Vocals				Keyboards	Studio
1998	Subway Mirror/O(:the circle)	Wisepope	Vocals	Guitars				CD-R, Recorded in 1994
1998	Steel	Heavy Metal Machine	Vocals					EP
1998	Dan Swanö	Moontower	Vocals	All Instruments				Studio
1999	Edge of Sanity	Evolution	Vocals	Add. Guitar			Keyboards	Compilation
1999	Odyssey	Odyssey	Vocals	All Instruments				EP
1999	Katatonia	Tonight's Decision				Session drums		Studio
1999	Infestdead	JesuSatan	Vocals	Guitars	Bass	Drum-programming		Studio
2000	Nightingale	I	Vocals	Guitars		Drums	Keyboards	Studio
2000	Bloodbath	Breeding Death	Backing vocals			Drums		EP
2001	Karaboudjan	Sbrodj	Vocals	All Instruments				EP
2001	Route Nine	The Works	Vocals	Guitars	Bass	Drums	Keyboards	Compilation
2002	Bloodbath	Resurrection Through Carnage				Drums		Studio
2002	Nightingale	Alive Again	Vocals	Guitars			Keyboards	Studio
2002	Star One	Space Metal	Vocals					Studio
2003	Nightingale	Alive Again	Vocals	Guitars			Keyboards	Studio
2003	Edge of Sanity	Crimson II	Vocals	All Instruments				Studio
2004	Nightingale	Invisible	Vocals	Guitars			Keyboards	Studio
2004	Bloodbath	Nightmares Made Flesh	Backing vocals	Guitars	Bass			Studio
2005	Nightingale	Nightfall Overture	Vocals	Guitars			Keyboards	Studio
2006	Edge of Sanity	When All Is Said	Vocals	Add. Guitar			Keyboards	Compilation
2007	Darkcide	Split EP with Infestdead	Vocals	All Instruments				Split EP
2007	Nightingale	White Darkness	Vocals	Guitar			Keyboards	Studio
2008	Bloodbath	The Wacken Carnage	Backing vocals	Guitar				Live
2008	Total Terror	Total Terror	Vocals	Guitar				Studio
2008	Nightingale	Box of Rock	Vocals	Guitar			Keyboards	Compilation
2010	Odyssey	Reinventing the Past	Vocals	All Instruments				Studio
2010	Star One	Victims of the Modern Age	Vocals					Studio
2010	Pan.Thy.Monium	...Dawn+Dream II		Lead Guitars	Bass		Keyboards	Compilation
2012	Edge of Sanity	Kur-Nu-Gi-A (2012 Reissue Edition)	Vocals	Add. Guitar			Keyboards	EP
2013	Witherscape	The Inheritance	Vocals			Drums	Keyboards	Studio
2014	Nightingale	Retribution	Vocals	Guitars			Keyboards	Studio
2014	Witherscape	The New Tomorrow	Vocals	Guitars			Keyboards	EP
2015	Unicorn	A Collection of Worlds Resurrection	Vocals			Drums		Compilation
2016	Infestdead	Satanic Serenades		Lead Guitars	Bass	Drum-programming	Keyboards	Compilation
2016	Witherscape	The Northern Sanctuary	Vocals	Guitars			Keyboards	Studio
2017	Nightingale	Rock Hard Live	Vocals	Guitars			Keyboards	Live
2018	Ghost	1983-1988	Vocals			Drums		Compilation
2022	Star One	Revel in Time	Vocals					On "Today Is Yesterday"
2022	Maceration	It Never Ends...	Vocals					Studio

=== Miscellaneous ===
- Laodicea
- Manfred Villes
- Necrony – guest vocals, guitars, compositions (under the alias "Day Disyraah")
- Second Sky
- Schecht + Akerfeldt + Swanö '98
- The Lucky Seven
- The Project Hate MCMXCIX – producer on Cybersonic Superchrist. Mixing and Mastering on Deadmarch: Initiation of Blasphemy, Armageddon March Eternal – Symphonies of Slit Wrists, In Hora Mortis Nostræ, and The Lustrate Process
- Ulan Bator
