= List of black metal bands, 0–K =

This is a list of black metal bands (numbers 0–9 and letters A through K) including artists that have at some point in their careers played black metal.

== 0−9 ==
- 1349

== A ==
- Abbath
- Abigail Williams
- Abigor
- Abominator
- Aborym
- Absu
- Absurd
- Abruptum
- Acheron
- Admonish
- Adorned Brood
- Aes Dana
- Aeternus
- Agalloch
- Agathodaimon
- Ajattara
- Akercocke
- Alastis
- Alcest
- The Amenta
- Amesoeurs
- Amestigon
- Anaal Nathrakh
- Ancient
- Ancient Rites
- ...And Oceans
- Angelcorpse
- Angizia
- Anorexia Nervosa
- Antaeus
- Antestor
- Apostasy
- Arallu
- Archgoat
- Arckanum
- Arcturus
- Arkhon Infaustus
- Armagedda
- Armageddon Holocaust
- Arthemesia
- Arvas
- Asgaroth
- Ásmegin
- Asmodeus
- Astarte
- Aura Noir
- Aurora Borealis
- Averse Sefira
- Axis of Advance
- The Axis of Perdition
- Azaghal

== B ==
- Bahimiron
- Bal-Sagoth
- Baptism
- Barathrum
- Bathory
- Behemoth
- Beherit
- Behexen
- Belphegor
- Bestial Mockery
- Bestial Warlust
- Bethlehem
- Big Boss
- Blackbraid
- Black Flame
- Black Messiah
- Black Murder
- Black Witchery
- Blasphemy
- Blood Tsunami
- Bloodthorn
- Blut Aus Nord
- Borknagar
- Botanist
- Bulldozer
- Burzum

== C ==
- Cadaveria
- Carach Angren
- Cardinal Sin
- Carpathian Forest
- Carpe Tenebrum
- Catamenia
- Celestia
- Celtic Frost
- Ceremonial Castings
- Chakal
- Chthonic
- Cirith Gorgor
- Clandestine Blaze
- Cobalt
- Code
- Cor Scorpii
- Countess
- Cradle of Filth
- Craft
- Crionics
- Cruachan
- Cultus Sanguine

== D ==
- Daemonarch
- Dance Club Massacre
- Darkened Nocturn Slaughtercult
- Dark Fortress
- Dark Funeral
- Darkspace
- Darkthrone
- Darkwoods My Betrothed
- Dawn
- Dawn of Azazel
- Darzamat
- Dawn of Relic
- Deafheaven
- Deathspell Omega
- Death SS
- December Wolves
- Deinonychus
- Demoncy
- Demoniac
- Den Saakaldte
- Desaster
- Destroy Destroy Destroy
- Deströyer 666
- Destruction
- Devian
- Devilish Impressions
- Devil Master
- Diaboli
- Diabolical Masquerade
- Diocletian
- Dimmu Borgir
- Dissection
- Dødheimsgard
- Dolorian
- Dorn
- Dornenreich
- Dragonlord
- Drastique
- Drottnar
- Drudkh

== E ==
- Eibon la Furies
- Einherjer
- Eisregen
- Emancer
- Embraced
- Emperor
- Empyrium
- Endstille
- Enslaved
- Enslavement of Beauty
- Enthroned
- Ephel Duath
- Epoch of Unlight
- Equilibrium
- Ewigkeit

== F ==
- Falkenbach
- Finntroll
- Fimbulwinter
- Fleurety
- Forefather
- Forest Stream
- Forgotten Tomb
- Frost Like Ashes
- Frosthardr
- Funeral Mist
- The Funeral Pyre

== G ==
- Gaahlskagg
- Gallhammer
- Gates of Ishtar
- Gehenna
- Ghost Bath
- Goatlord
- Goatwhore
- God Dethroned
- God Seed
- Golden Dawn
- Gonemage
- Gorgoroth
- Gospel of the Horns
- Grand Belial's Key
- Graveland
- Graveworm
- Grimfist

== H ==
- Hades Almighty
- Handful of Hate
- Hate
- Hate Forest
- Hecate
- Hecate Enthroned
- Helheim
- Hellhammer
- Hellripper
- Helrunar
- Hollenthon
- Holocausto
- Holy Blood
- Horna
- Horde
- Hortus Animae

== I ==
- I
- Ihsahn
- Ildjarn
- Immortal
- Impaled Nazarene
- Impiety
- In Battle
- Inchiuvatu
- In the Woods...
- Infernal
- Infernum
- Incantation
- Inquisition
- Isengard

== J ==
- Judas Iscariot

== K ==
- Kampfar
- Kanonenfieber
- Katatonia (early)
- Keep of Kalessin
- Kekal
- Khold
- King Diamond
- Klabautamann
- Koldbrann
- Korovakill
- The Kovenant
- Krallice
- Krieg
- Kvelertak
- Kult ov Azazel

== See also ==
- List of black metal bands, L–Z
- List of first-wave black metal bands
- List of heavy metal bands
- List of doom metal bands
- List of death metal bands
- List of folk metal bands
- List of thrash metal bands
