= Lists of black metal bands =

The lists of black metal bands that have articles available on Wikipedia can be found at:

- List of black metal bands, 0–K
- List of black metal bands, L–Z
- List of blackened death metal bands
- List of blackgaze artists
- List of first-wave black metal bands
- List of National Socialist black metal bands
- List of musicians in the early Norwegian black metal scene
- List of symphonic black metal bands
- List of unblack metal artists
- List of war metal bands
