= Formors =

Formors may refer to:

- the Fomorians, a semi-divine race who inhabited Ireland in ancient times
- Formors (album), a 2005 album by the French Celtic black metal band Aes Dana
