= First-wave black metal =

Early form of the black metal genre

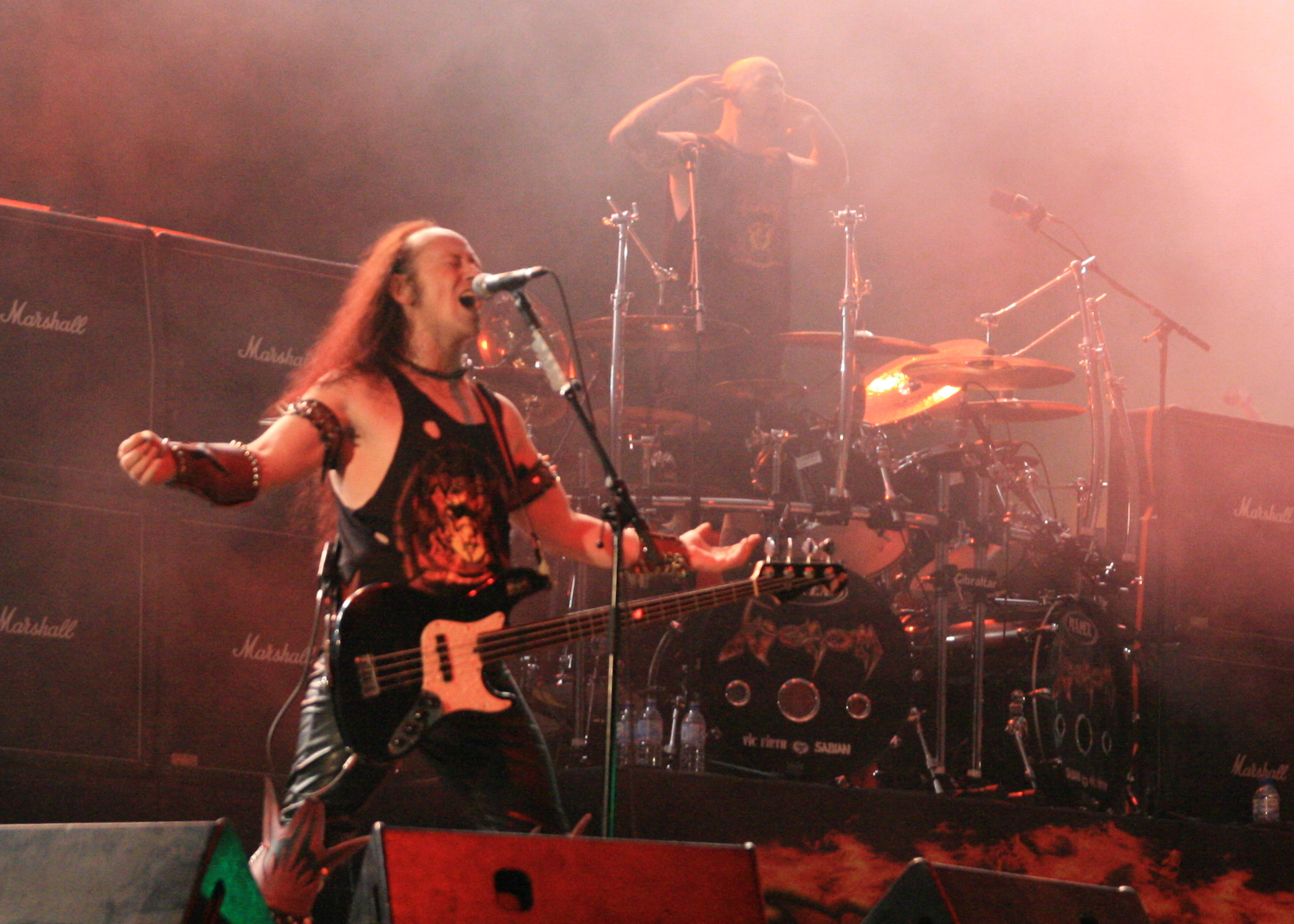
- Venom's second album, Black Metal (1982), marked the start of the black metal movement.
- Branch: Heavy metal
- Years active: 1982–1991
- Location: United Kingdom; Switzerland; Sweden; Brazil; Greece; Norway
- Major figures: Venom; Bathory; Hellhammer; Celtic Frost; Possessed; Sarcófago; Mayhem; Blasphemy
- Influences: Heavy metal; punk rock; crust punk (Note: Crust punk and first-wave black metal were contemporary and influenced each other.)
- Influenced: Early Norwegian black metal scene; black-thrash; black 'n' roll; death metal; thrash metal; war metal

The first wave of black metal was a musical movement of black metal which lasted from around 1982 until 1991. Stylistically distinct from the genre's quintessential later sound, the earliest bands in this first wave played a primordial form of extreme metal that was still indebted to traditional heavy metal. As well as being the origin of modern black metal, the movement influenced thrash metal, crust punk, death metal and war metal.

Venom initiated the movement, with their second album Black Metal (1982) giving it its name. In the following years, the style was developed by Bathory, Mercyful Fate, Hellhammer and Celtic Frost. The early works of thrash metal bands Sodom, Kreator, Destruction and Slayer are a part of the first wave of black metal, as is the early work of death metal pioneers Possessed and Death. By 1987, this wave had largely declined, but influential releases continued to be issued by Tormentor, Parabellum, Samael and Rotting Christ. At this time, the works of Sarcófago and Blasphemy pioneered war metal, while in the early Norwegian black metal scene, Mayhem and Thorns developed the style which came to define the subsequent waves of black metal.

== Characteristics ==
During the first wave, black metal was not a distinct genre, but was part of a broader extreme metal umbrella alongside the earliest death metal, grindcore and thrash metal groups. It was not until around 1987 that these styles began to distinguish themselves from each other, and the borders of what now constitutes black metal were drawn.

Music historian Joel McIver called Satanic lyrics and imagery the defining characteristic of the first wave of black metal. However, most bands in the wave were not Satanists; rather, they used Satanic themes to provoke controversy or gain attention. One of the few exceptions was Mercyful Fate singer and Church of Satan member King Diamond, whom Lords of Chaos authors Michael J. Moynihan and Didrik Søderlind called "one of the only performers of the '80s Satanic metal who was more than just a poseur using a devilish image for shock value".

Metal Injection writer J Andrew cited "the speed and attitude" of punk rock and hardcore punk as what separated the style of the first wave of black metal from earlier styles of heavy metal. PopMatters writer Craig Hayes specifically credited the legacy of Discharge as "crucial in black metal's development", recalling their influence in Venom, Bathory, Hellhammer and Mayhem.

== History ==
=== Origins: 1982–1986 ===
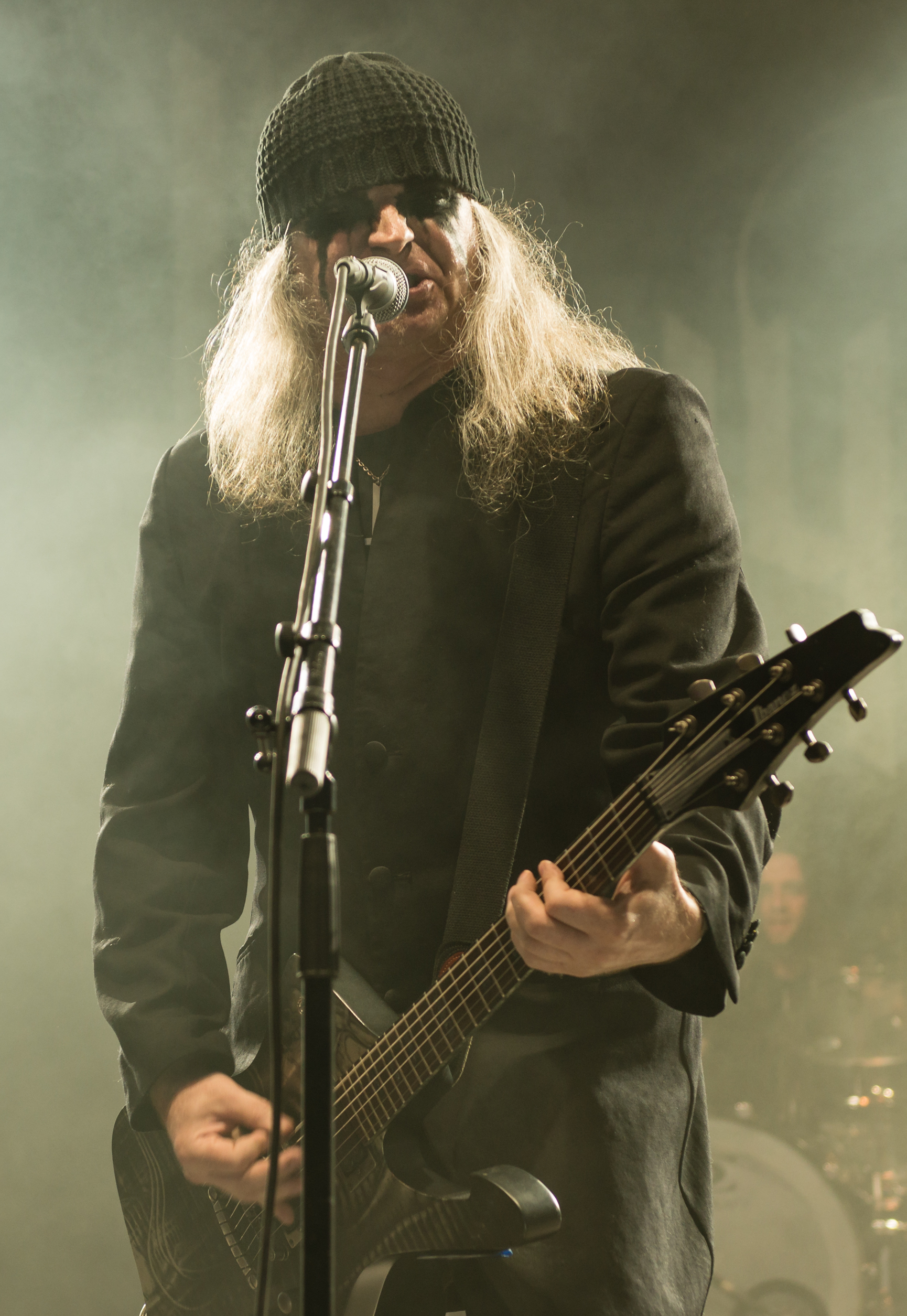
Thomas Gabriel Fischer, vocalist and guitarist for influential first wave of black metal bands Hellhammer and Celtic Frost

The English band Venom "paved the way for all three main genres of extreme metal". Playing a style of speed metal or proto-thrash metal, they released their first album Welcome to Hell in 1981, and coined the term "black metal" with their second album Black Metal in 1982. The album initiated the first wave of black metal, forming an early prototype for the genre. The band introduced many of the genre's tropes, such as blasphemous lyrics and imagery, stage names, costumes and face paint meant to strike fear.

Hellhammer, from Switzerland, made "truly raw and brutal music" with Satanic lyrics, and became an important influence on black metal. They recorded three demos in 1983 and released an EP in March 1984. Daniel Ekeroth wrote that "Their simple yet effective riffs and fast guitar sound were groundbreaking, anticipating the later trademark sound of early Swedish death metal". In 1984, Hellhammer transformed into Celtic Frost and released their first album, Morbid Tales. With their second album, To Mega Therion (1985), the band began to explore "more orchestral and experimental territories." For several years, Celtic Frost was considered one of the world's most extreme and original metal bands, significantly influencing the black metal genre. Black metal and crust punk evolved alongside each other, with the members of early crust band Amebix and early black metal band Hellhammer tape trading with each other. Thus, pioneering black metal bands such as Hellhammer, Bathory and Mayhem were inspired by crust punk, and early crust punk bands such as Amebix, Sacrilege and Antisect were influenced by Hellhammer and Celtic Frost.

Swedish band Bathory created "the blueprint for Scandinavian black metal" and have been described as "the biggest inspiration for the Norwegian black metal movement of the early nineties". Their songs first appeared on the compilation Scandinavian Metal Attack in March 1984, which drew much attention to the band, and they released their first album that October. Bathory's music was dark, raw, exceptionally fast, heavily distorted, and anti-Christian, and frontman Quorthon pioneered the shrieked vocals that later came to define black metal. Their third album Under the Sign of the Black Mark (1987) was described by journalist Dayal Patterson as creating "the black metal sound as we know it".

The Danish band Mercyful Fate influenced the Norwegian scene with their imagery and lyrics. Frontman King Diamond, who wore ghoulish black-and-white facepaint on stage, was one of the inspirators of what became known as 'corpse paint'. Other artists that were a part of the first wave included England's Onslaught, Italy's Bulldozer and Death SS, Japan's Sabbat and Colombia's Parabellum.

==== Spreading influence ====
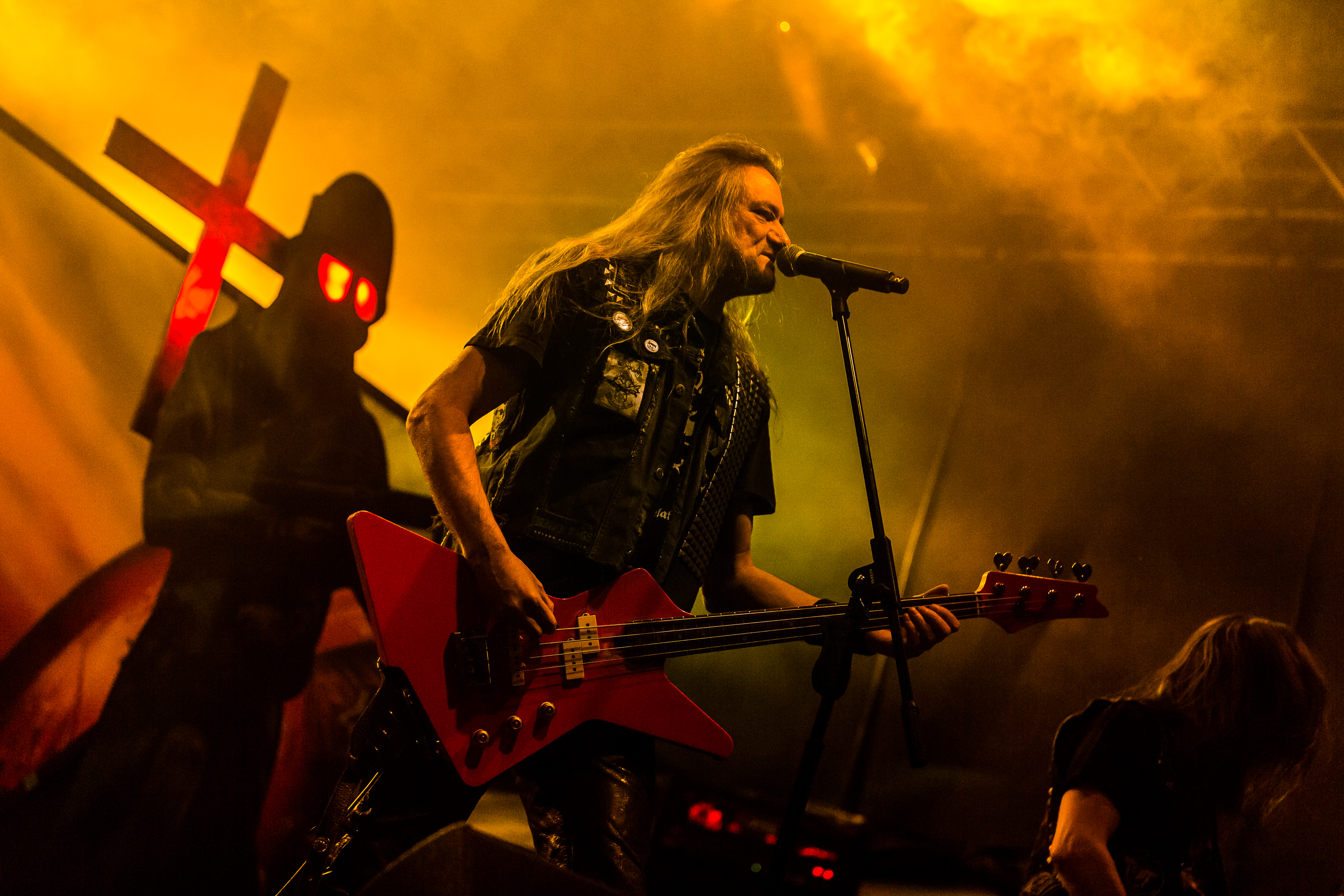
Sodom, a pioneering thrash metal band who was a part of the first wave of black metal

First wave black metal bands also influenced thrash metal, with Scott Ian of thrash metal band Anthrax even crediting Venom as being a "thrash band before thrash existed". German Teutonic thrash metal bands Sodom, Kreator and Destruction, and Slayer from the United States, "are inextricably linked to the history of black metal". According to writer Dayal Patterson in his book Black Metal: Evolution of the Cult, the early works of these four bands are often considered part of the first wave of black metal.

Possessed, from the San Francisco Bay Area grew out of the first wave black metal scene and would go on to be described by AllMusic as "connecting the dots" between thrash metal and death metal with their 1985 debut album, Seven Churches. The band had cited Venom and Motörhead, as well as early work by Exodus, as the main influences on their sound. Although the group had released only two studio albums and an EP in their formative years, they have been described by music journalists and musicians as either being "monumental" in developing the death metal style, or as being the first death metal band. In Orlando, Florida, Mantas, following a similar progression, played a Venom-inspired sound before changing their name to Death and beginning to play death metal. The band made a major impact in the emerging Florida death metal scene, and frontman Chuck Schuldiner has been credited by AllMusic's Eduardo Rivadavia for being widely recognised as the "Father of Death Metal". and their debut album, Scream Bloody Gore (1987), has been described as "the first true death metal record" by the San Francisco Chronicle.

=== Developments: 1987–1991 ===
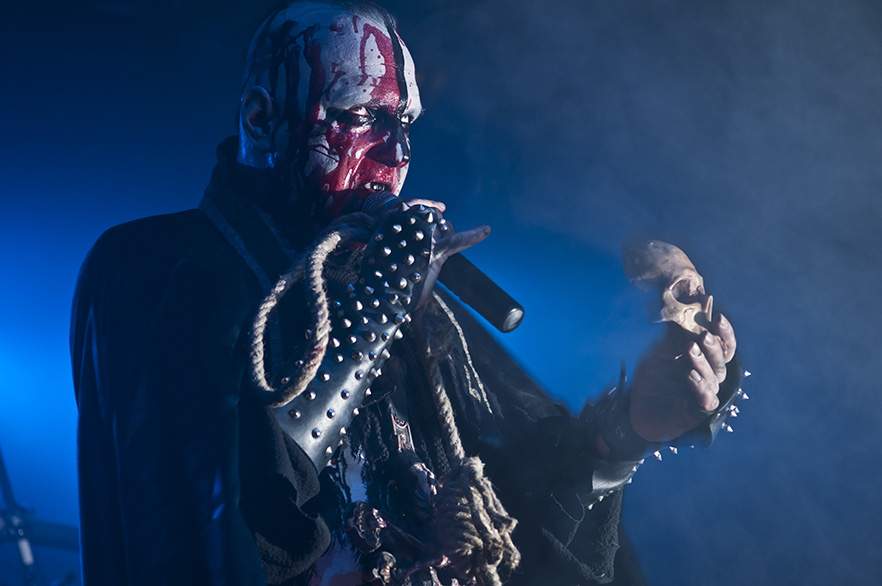
Attila Csihar, vocalist for Tormentor and Mayhem

In 1987, in the fifth issue of his Slayer fanzine, Jon 'Metalion' Kristiansen wrote that "the latest fad of black/Satanic bands seems to be over", citing United States bands Incubus and Morbid Angel, as well as Sabbat from Great Britain as some of the few continuing the genre. However, black metal continued in the underground, with scenes developing in Czechoslovakia with Root, Törr and Master's Hammer and Brazil with Sepultura, Vulcano, Holocausto and Sarcófago, Sarcófago's debut album I.N.R.I. (1987), was widely influential on subsequent acts in the genre, especially the second wave Norwegian scene and groups in the war metal style. BrooklynVegan writer Kim Kelly calling it "a gigantic influence on black metal's sound, aesthetics, and attitude."

In Sweden, Mefisto, Obscurity and Merciless were some of the earliest bands to follow in Bathory's footsteps, combining their sound with influences from German groups like Sodom and Destruction. Although Mefisto and Obscurity only released two demos each, and rarely performed live, Merciless became prominent in the extreme metal underground. Their live performances became notorious for bassist Fredrik Karlén's reckless behaviour, including climbing up buildings and jumping off of balconies. Furthermore, the band's 1988 demo Realm of the Dark, led to them becoming the first Swedish extreme metal band after Bathory to be signed to a record label, in this case of Euronymous's label Deathlike Silence Productions, who released Merciless's 1990 debut album The Awakening. Other black metal bands in Sweden from this time included Grotesque, Tiamat and Morbid.

During this time, other influential records in the genre were released by Von (from the United States), Rotting Christ (from Greece), Tormentor (from Hungary), Mortuary Drape (from Italy), Kat (from Poland), Samael (from Switzerland) and Blasphemy (from Canada). Blasphemy's debut album Fallen Angel of Doom (1990) is one of the most influential records for the war metal style. Fenriz of the Norwegian band Darkthrone called Master's Hammer's debut album Ritual "the first Norwegian black metal album, even though they are from Czechoslovakia".

Mayhem's debut EP Deathcrush (1987) was one of the most influential releases from the first wave of black metal, largely founding the early Norwegian black metal scene. Mayhem guitarist Øystein "Euronymous" Aarseth and Snorre "Blackthorn" Ruch of Thorns developed a style of riffing where guitarists played full chords using all the strings of the guitar instead of relying on power chords, which typically use only two or three strings, which would become a key element of the subsequent waves of black metal. In the book Lords of Chaos, Mayhem were credited as the band who combined the influence of the desperate styles of black metal's first wave and created the style that is understood as black metal today.

== Legacy ==
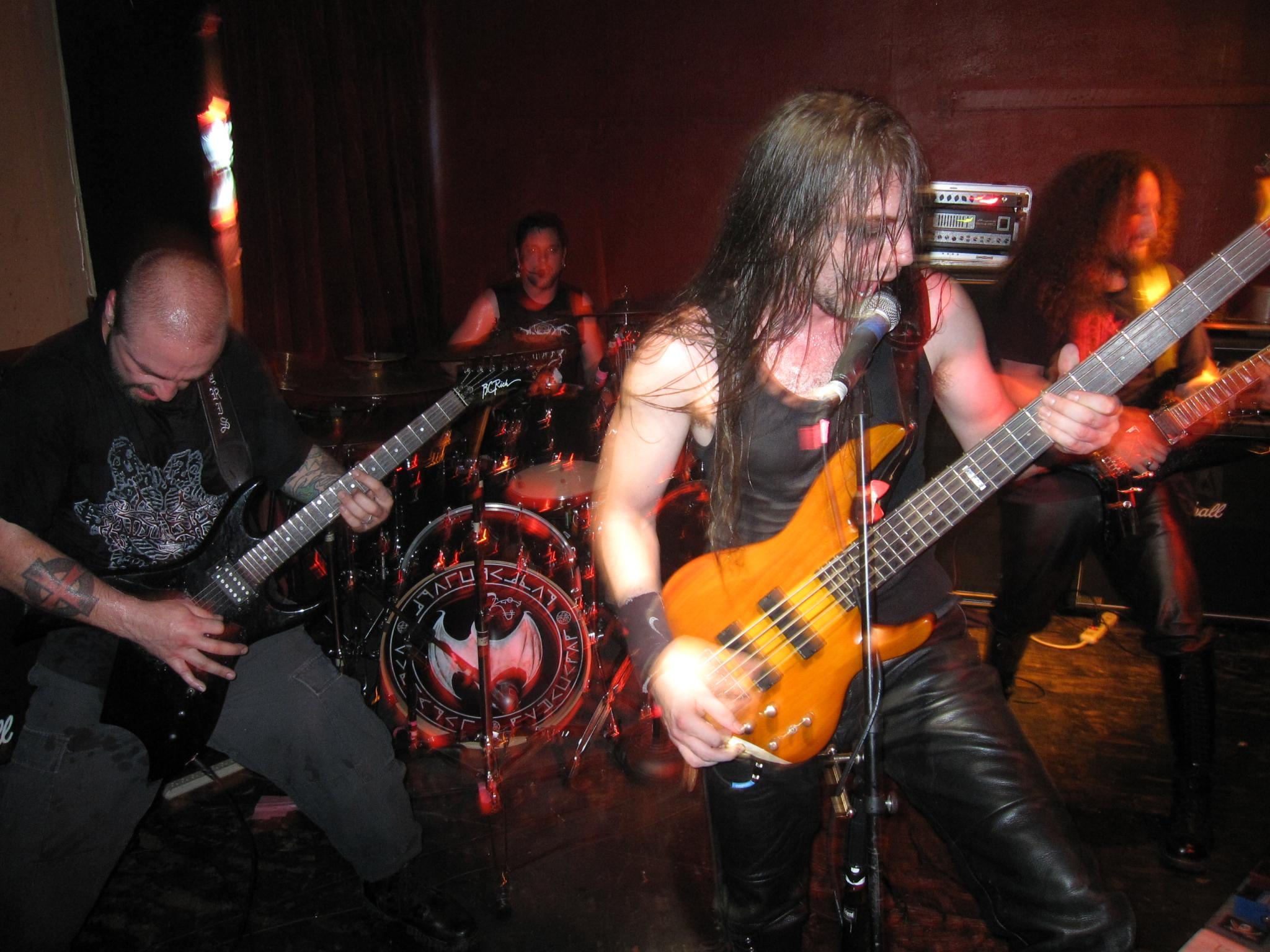
Absu, who continued the sound of first-wave black metal after the movement's decline

The second-wave of black metal began in 1991, with Rock Hard magazine crediting Samael's Worship Him (1 April 1991) as its beginnings, while, Metal Hammer writer Enrico Ahlig cited it as beginning with the 8 April 1991 suicide of then-Mayhem and former Morbid vocalist Dead. With the prominence of the second-wave Norwegian scene, black metal was largely re-defined by their higher-pitched and shrieking style. However, during the second-wave, some bands continued to perform music in the style of the first-wave. This was particularly prominent amongst bands from the United States, including Profanatica, Absu and Black Witchery, as well as Incantation on their debut album Onward to Golgotha (1992).

The black-thrash genre is a revival of the sound of early first wave black metal bands such as Venom, Sodom and Sarcófago, with notable acts including Aura Noir and Nifelheim. Decibel have conflated first wave black metal with black-thrash. Black 'n' roll is another genre which revives the movement's sound.

== See also ==
- List of first-wave black metal bands
- Extreme metal
- New wave of British heavy metal
- Early Norwegian black metal scene
- Speed metal
- Biker metal
- Occult rock
