= The Sum of All Fears (disambiguation) =

The Sum of All Fears is a novel by Tom Clancy.

The Sum of All Fears may also refer to:

- The Sum of All Fears (film), a 2002 film by Phil Alden Robinson
- The Sum of All Fears (video game), a video game by Red Storm Entertainment
- The Sum of All Fears (album), a 1999 album by Cultus Sanguine
