= Aes Dana =

Aes Dana may refer to:

- áes dána (Old Irish) or aois-dàna (Scottish Gaelic), "people of the arts" until the late 17th century
- Aes Dana (band), a French Celtic black metal band
- Aosdána, an Irish organisation of people who have achieved distinction in the arts
- AES Dana, alias of Vincent Villuis, a French composer, sound designer, and DJ, the founder of the Ultimae Records label
