= List of black metal bands, L–Z =

This is a list of black metal bands (letters L through Z) including bands that have at some point in their careers played black metal.

== L ==
- Lengsel
- Leviathan
- Lifelover
- Limbonic Art
- Lord Belial
- The Lord Diabolus
- Lord Kaos
- Lorna Shore
- Leviathan
- Liturgy
- Lover of Sin
- Ludicra
- Lux Occulta

== M ==
- Månegarm
- Manes
- Marduk
- Master's Hammer
- Mayhem
- The Meads of Asphodel
- Melechesh
- Mercyful Fate
- Mezzerschmitt
- Mgła
- Midnight
- Minenwerfer
- Mithotyn
- Moonsorrow
- Moonspell
- Morbid
- Morgul
- Moribund Oblivion
- Mutilator
- Mütiilation
- Myrkgrav
- Myrkskog
- Mystic Circle

== N ==
- Nachtmystium
- Naer Mataron
- Nagelfar
- Naglfar
- Nahemah
- Nargaroth
- Nattefrost
- Nazxul
- Necrodeath
- Necromantia
- Necrophobic
- Nefastus Dies
- Negură Bunget
- Nifelheim
- Nightfall
- Nocturnal Breed
- Nokturnal Mortum
- Nortt
- Notre Dame

== O ==
- O, Majestic Winter
- Oathean
- Obscene Eulogy
- Obscurity
- Obtained Enslavement
- Obtest
- Ofermod
- Old Funeral
- Old Man's Child
- Ondskapt
- Opera IX
- Ophthalamia
- Oranssi Pazuzu
- Orcustus
- Order from Chaos
- Ov Hell

== P ==
- Panopticon
- Pantheon I
- Parabellum
- Paradox
- Paysage D'Hiver
- Peccatum
- Peste Noire
- Primordial
- Profanatica

== R ==
- Ragnarok
- Ram-Zet
- Revenge
- Rotting Christ
- Rudra
- Ruins

== S ==
- Sabbat
- Sacramentum
- Salem
- Samael
- Sanctifica
- Sarcófago
- Sargeist
- Sarke
- Satanic Slaughter
- Satanic Warmaster
- Satyricon
- Schaliach
- Scour
- Sear Bliss
- Secrets of the Moon
- Selfmindead
- Sepultura
- Setherial
- Shaytan
- Shade Empire
- Shining
- Siebenbürgen
- Sigh
- Skeletonwitch
- Skitliv
- Skyforger
- Slavia
- Slechtvalk
- Sodom (early)
- Solefald
- Sólstafir
- Sonic Reign
- Spectral Wound
- Spektr
- The Stone
- Stormlord
- Striborg
- Sturmgeist
- Summoning
- Sunn O)))
- Susperia (early)
- Svartsyn
- Sympathy

== T ==
- Taake
- Teitanblood
- Theatres des Vampires
- Thorns
- Thou Art Lord
- Thronar
- Thy Serpent
- Thyrane
- Thyrfing
- Tiamat
- Tormentor
- Törr
- Toxic Holocaust
- Trail of Tears
- Trelldom
- Tribes of Caïn
- Tristwood
- Troll
- Tsjuder
- Tvangeste
- Twilight
- Twilight Ophera
- Twin Obscenity
- Tyrant

== U ==
- Ulver
- Unanimated
- Underoath
- Unexpect
- Unholy
- Urgehal

== V ==
- Vaakevandring
- Vardøger
- Valhall
- Ved Buens Ende
- Velvet Cacoon
- Venom
- Vesania
- Vesperian Sorrow
- Viking Crown
- Vintersorg
- Vital Remains
- Vlad Tepes
- Von
- Vondur
- Vorkreist
- Vreid
- Vudmurk
- Vulcano

== W ==
- Watain
- Weakling
- Windir
- Witchery
- Witchfynde
- Wolfchant
- Wolves in the Throne Room
- Woods of Ypres
- Wykked Wytch
- Wyrd

== X ==
- Xasthur

== Z ==
- Zuriaake
- Zweizz
- Zyklon
- Zyklon-B

== See also ==
- List of black metal bands, 0–K
- List of first-wave black metal bands
- List of heavy metal bands
- List of doom metal bands
- List of death metal bands
- List of folk metal bands
- List of thrash metal bands
