= Tha-Norr =

1994–1997 German black metal band

- Origin: Lower Saxony, Germany
- Genres: Black metal
- Labels: Nazgul’s Eyrie Productions
- Members: Hendrik Poppe; Marko Sklenarz
- Past members: Felix Alesis

Tha-Norr were a German black metal band from Lower Saxony.

== Biography ==
Tha-Norr recorded the Assault on Aerie demo cassette at Dark Knight Studio and released it in 1994. The song Tyrant of a New Aeon was recorded on the sixth and seventh of June 1994 at the same studio, mixed at Confusion Studios and released on the Infinite Visions of Hell compilation album via Ground Zero Entertainment in 1994. Hendrik Poppe played drums on this track.

From November 1994 to February 1995, they recorded nine songs for their only studio album Wolfenzeitalter, on which Tyrant of a New Aeon was re-released, at Confusion Studios. The lyrics for the song Tears for All Those Who Died were written by Absurd drummer Hendrik “Jarl Flagg Nidhoegg” Möbus. The album mentions Hendrik Poppe and Marko Sklenarz but does not specify who played which instrument, so it is likely that the two members shared vocals and Marko Sklenarz played guitar as on all former recordings while Hendrik Poppe played all other instruments. It is only specified that the 12-string guitar and solo on The Fortress Will Fall were played by producer and mixer Kai Schwerdtfeger and “[a]ll keyboards and ‘Fegefeuer’ by Nachtsprung (Norbert Weber)”. The band greeted Florian Müller and Sebastian Theby as “future members of Tha-Norr” in the booklet.

It is unknown then Tha-Norr disbanded, but Opyros, the leader of Nazgul’s Eyrie Productions, mentioned that their last concert was held in May 1997 in Bramsche together with Sabbat, Countess and Barathrum.

== Music and ideology ==
On the Barbarian Wrath homepage, Opyros, the former leader of Nazgul’s Eyrie Productions, described the band’s style as “‘HELLHAMMER on Speed’ Black Metal being inspiration to many who followed. Listen to ‘Tears For All Those Who Died’ or ‘Tyrant Of A New Aeon’ and compare it to later recorded albums like MOONBLOODs ‘Blut Und Krieg’ […].” Alexander von Meilenwald (ex-Nagelfar, The Ruins of Beverast) called Tha-Norr one of the most underrated German bands and their album “a fantastic, extremely atmospheric underground jewel” and one of the five most important German black metal releases. German Rock Hard magazine featured the album on the list 250 Black-Metal-Alben, die man kennen sollte (‘250 black metal albums you should know’).

Although Tha-Norr had no NS lyrics, they are sometimes listed as an NSBM band, possibly because the lyrics to Tears for All Those Who Died were written by German neo-Nazi Hendrik Möbus. Their demo recording Assault on Aerie features the statement "we only believe in ourselves and our music". They thanked “Aleister Crowley and Gregor A. Gregorius for inspiration” on their album.

== Last known lineup ==
- Hendrik Poppe
- Marko Sklenarz

=== Past members ===
- Felix Alesis - drums

== Discography ==
- 1994: Assault on Aerie (demo)
- 1994: Tyrant of a New Aeon on Infinite Visions of Hell
- 1995: Wolfenzeitalter
