= Klabautamann =

German black metal band

Klabautamann is a German black metal band with folk and progressive influences. "Klabautamann" is a variation of "Klabautermann", a shipwreck-predicting goblin.

== Band history ==
The band was formed by Tim Steffens and Florian Toyka in 1998 in Meckenheim, North Rhine-Westphalia. After two demos, the band finished their debut album, Our Journey through the Woods, in summer 2003. Marlon Drescher played session drums and Armin Rave mixed and mastered. In February 2005, they self-produced and released Der Ort on Heavy Horses Records. This time the CD was completely produced by the band. Patrick Schröder played session drums, Isabel Jasse and Stefan Horn guested vocals, and Julia Tomaschitz and Christian Kolf wrote some lyrics. In June 2009, they released Merkur in CD format on the band's own label, Zeitgeister Music. Heavy Horses Records released a vinyl version of 500 units.

On 21 November 2011, the band released Old Chamber, which was a departure from the progressive/black metal with jazz/lounge influences of Merkur. The sound has been described as back "into the realms of pure frozen Black Metal atmosphere once again." It was followed by Smaragd, released on 6 June 2017, by Zeitgeister Music.

== Discography ==
- Opus Obscoenum Infernalis (1998, demo)
- Gott Schenkt Gift (2000, demo)
- Our Journey through the Woods (2003, full-length)
- Der Ort (2005, full-length)
- Klabautamann (2007, EP)
- Merkur (2009, full-length)
- The Old Chamber (2011, full-length)
- Smaragd (2017, full-length)

== Lineup ==
- Tim Steffens (1998-) - guitars, bass guitar, vocals
- Florian Toyka (1998-2019) - guitars, bass guitar
