= Diaboli =

Finnish black metal band, formed in 1992

- Also known as: Sigillum Diaboli
- Origin: Pirkkala, Finland
- Genres: Black metal, death metal
- Years active: 1992–present
- Labels: Full Moon, Northern Heritage, Unisound
- Members: Petri "Pete Desecrator" Ilvespakka
- Past members: P. "Hrim Grimn'r" Pihlström; J. Koskinen; M. Martiskainen; Elias Viljanen
- Website: www.diaboli.net

Diaboli (formerly Sigillum Diaboli) is a Finnish black metal band, formed in 1992 as a five-piece. Following band member departures and the suicide of vocalist Hrim Grimn'r in 2001, Diaboli continued as a one-man project. The band has released five full-length albums for the labels Unisound, Full Moon Productions and Northern Heritage.

== Biography ==
Diaboli were formed as a five-piece in summer 1992 in Pirkkala, Finland as Sigillum Diaboli. This line-up recorded a single demo, Descent into Hell, released in November 1992, and played the band's only show to date in January 1993. 200 copies of the first demo were pressed and it demonstrated a more pronounced death metal influence than their later material. By the recording of Sigillum Diaboli's second demo, the band was reduced to vocalist P. "Hrim Grimn'r" Pihlström and multi-instrumentalist Petri "Pete Desecrator" Ilvespakka. The two released a second demo in June 1994 in a pressing of 400 copies, which included a cover of Hellhammer's "The Third of the Storms". The band changed their name to Diaboli in summer 1995, apparently due to Ilvespakka's annoyance at misspellings by journalists and fans, and the two members decided to part due to clashing egos. Ilvespakka signed to Greek label Unisound in 1995 and recorded the debut Diaboli album late that year, in 30 hours. The result, Mesmerized by Darkness, was released that summer. Ilvesparkka cited Slayer, Venom, Celtic Frost, Bathory and Darkthrone as influences.

Owing to problems with Unisound, Diaboli moved to US label Full Moon in 1997, signing for two albums. The second album, Towards Damnation, was released in January 1998, and the third, Anthems of Sorrow, recorded in the Autumn of that year, seeing the return of Grimn'r on vocals. However, in December 1999 Ilvespakka was arrested for attempting to murder someone with an axe and sentenced to four years and six months in prison. As a first time offender, he was released after two years and three months. In 2000, Grimn'r also spent some time in prison for "violence charges". In June 2001, Grimn'r committed suicide.

Anthems of Sorrow finally saw release through Full Moon in 2000. Upon release from prison in March 2002, Ilvespakka set about recording new material. The first release after this date was the limited edition (500 copies) 7-inch EP Descent into Hell, through the Finnish label Northern Heritage. The EP featured two songs from the first Sigillum Diaboli demo re-recorded in 1999 and was dedicated to the memory of Grimn'r. In July 2003, Northern Heritage also released the Unseen Age of War compilation, which featured twelve unreleased songs and the two Sigillum Diaboli demos.

Since then Northern Heritage has released Diaboli's fourth and fifth albums, Kirous (Finnish for "curse", in October 2004) and The Antichrist (in October 2006). In March 2008, the label also released limited edition (500 copies) vinyl versions of Kirous and The Antichrist. All instrumentation, vocals and lyrics were composed and performed by Ilvespakka; apparently the material for The Antichrist was recorded during the sessions for Kirous. Ilvespakka has also released two albums with thrash/death metal outfit Psychopathic Terror, in collaboration with Korpiklaani drummer Matti Johansson.

== Line-up ==
=== Current line-up ===
- Petri "Pete Desecrator" Ilvespakka (all instruments, vocals; also of Depravity, Psychopathic Terror)

=== Former members ===
- P. "Hrim Grimn'r" Pihlström (vocals, keyboards)
- J. Koskinen (guitar)
- M. Martiskainen (guitar)
- Elias Viljanen (drums, keyboards, guitar; also of Astral, Depravity, Mess, Sonata Arctica)

== Discography ==
=== As Sigillum Diaboli ===
- Descent into Hell (demo, 1992)
- Demo II (demo, 1993)

=== As Diaboli ===
- Mesmerized by Darkness (LP, Unisound, 1996)
- Towards Damnation (LP, Full Moon, 1998)
- Anthems of Sorrow (LP, Full Moon, 2000)
- Descent into Hell (7-inch EP, Northern Heritage, 2002)
- Unseen Age of War (compilation, Northern Heritage, 2003)
- Kirous (LP, Northern Heritage, 2004)
- The Antichrist (LP, Northern Heritage, 2006)
- Invocation (LP, Heritage Records, 2010)
- Wiking Division (LP, Heritage Records, 2015)
