= Drastique =

Italian avant-garde gothic metal band

- Origin: Venice, Italy; Wrocław, Poland
- Genres: Gothic metal, black metal
- Years active: 1995–present
- Labels: Beyond Productions; CD Maximum
- Members: Chris Buchman; Fay; Mahavira
- Past members: Alessia De Boni; Chiara Donaggio
- Website: www.drastique.com

Drastique (formerly Drastic) is an avant-garde gothic metal band from Italy with progressive metal and symphonic black metal influences.

== Biography ==
Drastique was founded as a one-man band in 1995 by Chris Buchman as Drastic. The band's only demo, Creator of Feelings, was released in September 1995 in 200 copies with a black and white cover, and then reissued in 1996 by Beyond Productions with a color cover. The demo featured Chiara Donaggio on female vocals, and was produced by Marco Biolcati, vocalist and guitar player of Wrest and Blackburn. Creator of Feelings was selected as "best demo" by Metal hammer magazine, Metal Shock magazine, and Flash magazine. In 1998, Drastic released Thieves of Kisses on Beyond Productions, featuring Alessia De Boni / Pamsy and Chiara Donaggio on female vocals. The album was recorded at Nadir Studios in Genoa, Italy, and was produced by Tommy Talamanca, guitarist and keyboard player of Sadist. Thieves of Kisses was selected by Metal Hammer as "Best Italian Album of the Year", and can be considered one of the first Italian avant-garde metal releases. In 2000, Drastic covered "Black Mass" by Death SS, featured on the tribute album Beyond the realms of Death SS, published by Black Widow Records. In 2003, Drastic changed to Drastique, and releasedPleasureligion on Beyond Productions, featuring female vocalist Fay and male vocalist Mahavira (formerly of Ensoph), though some male parts were performed by Buchman, who wrote and performed the instrumental parts and wrote the lyrics in English, Polish, Latin and Italian, with poetic and philosophical quotations. The album was released in a limited digipak version and in a jewel case version. The CD was distributed by Masterpiece Distribution in Italy and by Adipocere, Relapse and Century Media worldwide. In 2004, the album was licensed to CD Maximum for Russia and Eastern Europe.

== Discography ==
=== Studio albums ===
- Thieves of Kisses (1998)
- Pleasureligion (2003)
- Let Your Life Pass You By(2012)

=== Demo ===
- Creator of Feelings (1995)

=== Compilations ===
- Screams from Italy Vol. II (1996)
- Black Tears of Death Vol. I (1996)
- Florilegium Insanie (1999)
- Beyond the Realms of Death SS (2000)
- Metallian Sampler n.29 (2003)
- Loud Souds n.11 – Rock Hard Magazine (2003)

== Members ==
=== Current line up ===
- Chris Buchman – vocals, guitar, bass guitar, keyboard, drums (1995–present)
- Fay – female vocals (2002–present)
- Mahavira – male vocals (2002–present)

=== Former members ===
- Chiara Donaggio – female vocals (1995–2001)
- Alessia De Boni – female vocals (1997–2001)
