= Eibon la Furies =

UK musical group

- Origin: Lincoln, England
- Genres: Black metal, Gothic black metal
- Years active: Since 2005
- Label: Code666 Records
- Members: Lord Eibon Blackwood; Lady Titania Blackwood; The Furious Host; Battalion; Spectral Symphony; Cara & Leah
- Website: eibonlafuries.co.uk

Eibon la Furies are an English black metal band inspired by Victorian themes, especially the occult side of society. Their sound is experimental, with an early industrial leaning that became more progressive when a full live band was developed.

The experimental black metal band was started by Lord Eibon Blackwood. They released their first CD in 2006, Something Wicked This Way Comes, followed by Yours Truly... From Hell in 2007. These two CDs featured singer Lady Titania Blackwood and Spectral Symphony on keyboards.

In 2008, a live band was assembled, consisting of The Furious Host on bass and Battalion on drums and percussion, with live performers Cara and Leah.

Eibon la Furies have garnered positive reviews from the press and internet, who think the band are unique. Blast! Magazine said, "Eibon La Furies are deserving of your attention. They are probably the most "English-sounding" band around at the minute as well, so if your opinion of the UK's metal output has become a little jaded over the last few years this is a good place to return to." Terrorizer Magazine stated, "Eibon la Furies manage to induce dizziness with (their) freeform adaptation and juxtaposition of genre shrapnel, from techno beats to goth to fierce BM to neo-folk". Zero Tolerance Magazine opined, "This mix of black metal, gothic hysteria and horror movie soundtrack inspired soundscapes is pretty entertaining, worthy of further attention".

== Discography ==
The Immoral Compass (2013 – Released worldwide by Code666)

1. The Compass Awakes [Intro]
2. Immoral Compass to the World
3. Astronomy in Absences
4. Imperial Jackal's Head
5. Flames 1918 (A Song for the Silence)
6. An Enigma in Space and Time
7. Who Watches the Watchers
8. Conjure Me
9. Ascending Through Darkness
10. The Vanguard
11. The End of Everything (Or the beginning of it all)
12. The Compass Remains [Outro]

The Blood of the Realm (2010 – Released worldwide by Code666 as a deluxe 6 panel digipack)

1. The Blood of The Realm [Intro]
2. The Devil is an Englishman
3. Tears of Angels & Dreams of Demons
4. Horse of The Invisible
5. Winter Kings, Wicker Men & Her Infernal Majesty Brigantia
6. Dominion of Will
7. A Shadow Over London Pt 1
8. Yours Truly, From Hell
9. ...And By The Moonlight
10. A Shadow Over London Pt 2
11. I Am Whitechapel
12. A Shadow Over London Pt 3
13. ...Of Golden Dawns
14. Dark Designs
15. Infinite Man [Outro]

Yours Truly... From Hell (2007 – Released by The Ministry For Infernal Affairs)

1. Yours Truly...
2. ... And By The Moonlight (Dear Boss Version)
3. The Devil Is An Englishman
4. A Shadow Over London (Pt 1)
5. I Am Whitechapel
6. The Ripper (Judas Priest cover)
7. A Shadow Over London (Pt 2)
8. ... From Hell
9. ... And By The Moonlight (Film Clip)
10. Yours Truly... From Hell (Film Clip)

Something Wicked This Way Come (2006 – Released by The Ministry For Infernal Affairs)

1. Tears of Angels & Dreams of Demons
2. Horse of the Invisible
3. The Lamplighter of Souls
4. ... And By The Moonlight
5. ... Of Dark Woods & Deep Water
6. Dark Designs
7. Transilvanian Hunger (cello and keys) (Darkthrone cover)
8. The Lamplighter of Souls (Film Clip)

== Current line-up ==
- Paul Sims (Lord Eibon) – vocals, guitars, (bass, programming and keyboards on recording)
- Matt Cook (The Furious Host) – bass/vocals
- Jamie Batt (Battalion) – drums
- Neil Purdy – lead guitar
