= Cultus Sanguine =

Italian black metal band

- Origin: Milan, Lombardy, Italy
- Genres: Black metal Doom metal Gothic metal
- Years active: 1993-2001
- Labels: Wounded Love; Candlelight; Season Of Mist

Cultus Sanguine was an Italian black metal band, characterised by gloomy themes and soundscapes.

== Bio ==
Cultus Sanguine was founded in 1993 as a duo, but expanded to a trio with a drummer. After a 1995 EP, they added keyboard player Rex Nebulah before signing to Candlelight Records for the 1998 album Shadow's Blood. Following this, guitarist/bassist Aqua Regis and drummer Custus Arckanorum left the group, and guitarist Aurian and drummer Nox Perpetua joined. Two further releases appeared on Season of Mist before the group disbanded in 2001.

== Line-up ==
- Joe Fergieph (vocals)
- Aqua Regis (Roberto Mammarella of Monumentum; guitar and bass)
- Custos Arcanorum (drums)
- Rex Nebulah (keyboards)
- Aurian (guitar)
- Nox Perpetua (Fabrizio Cislaghi of Macbeth) (drums)
- Ouranos - keyboards

== Discography ==
- Cultus Sanguine EP (Wounded Love Records/Avantgarde Music, 1995)
- Shadow's Blood (Candlelight Records, 1998)
- The Sum of All Fears (Season of Mist, 1999)
- WAR Vol III (Season of Mist, 2000)
