= List of first-wave black metal bands =

This is a list of bands who were a part of the first wave of black metal, which took place between roughly 1982 and 1991.

== List ==
- Bathory
- Blasphemy
- Bulldozer
- Celtic Frost
- Death SS
- Destruction
- Grotesque
- Hellhammer
- Holocausto
- Kat
- King Diamond
- Kreator
- Mayhem
- Mefisto
- Merciless
- Mercyful Fate
- Mantas
- Master's Hammer
- Morbid
- Morbid Angel
- Mortuary Drape
- Onslaught
- Parabellum
- Possessed
- Root
- Rotting Christ
- Sabbat
- Sabbat
- Samael
- Sarcófago
- Sepultura
- Slayer
- Sodom
- Tiamat
- Tormentor
- Thorns
- Törr
- Venom
- Von
- Vulcano
