= Aes Dana (band) =

French band

- Origin: Paris, France
- Genres: Celtic metal, black metal
- Years active: 1994–present
- Labels: Oaken Shield, Sacral, Trollzorn
- Members: Vidar; Taliesin; Iréel; Milambre; Myrddin; Wilfrid Rodel
- Past members: (see below)
- Website: aesdana.free.fr

Aes Dana is a French Celtic/black metal band, based in Paris. The band's name is Old Irish for "people of the arts".

The band mixes growling vocals and heavy guitars with traditional Celtic instruments like the Irish flute or bombard. These characteristics, coming from the various influences of the band's early members (death metal, black metal, grindcore, and folk music), give the band a unique sound.

Their lyrics are primarily in French, and deal with Celtic mythology.

== Biography ==
Aes Dana was formed in 1994, with Taliesin (guitar) and Amorgen (Irish flute), soon joined by Vidar (vocals), Storm (drums), and Christophe (bass). In 1997 and 1999, Christophe was replaced with Milambre, and Storm with Juan Jolocaust. Seth joined as a second guitarist.

In 2000, the band released La chasse sauvage, their first full-length album. Seth left the band that year and Tilion replaced him. The band added new traditional instruments such as the bombard, featured in their second album, La chasse sauvage, released in 2001, and their third, Formors, in 2005. Until 2005, the lineup had an equal number of men and women. According to the band, it was not a deliberate decision, but a product of chance.

== Band members ==
=== Current line-up ===
- Taliesin - guitars (1994–2005, 2008–present)
- Vidar - vocals (1994–present)
- Milambre - bass (1997–present)
- Myrddin - tin whistle, bombard (2005–present)
- Iréel - guitars (2010–present)
- Wilfrid Rodel - drums (2011–present)

=== Former members ===
- Tomaz Boucherifi-Kadiou - tin whistle, bombard (1997–1998)
- Storm - drums (1994–1999)
- Amorgen - flute, tin whistle (1994–1997, 1998–2005)
- Christophe - bass (1996–1997)
- Seth - guitars (1997–2000)
- Juan Jolocaust - drums (1999–2009)
- Tilion - guitars (2000–2009)
- Hades - flute (2005)
- Aegir - guitars (2005–2008)

== Discography ==
- Chroniques du crépuscule (demo, 1997)
- Promo CD (demo, 2000)
- La chasse sauvage (2001)
- Formors (2005)
