= Parabellum (Colombian band) =

Colombian extreme metal band

- Origin: Medellín, Colombia
- Genres: Black metal, thrash metal, death metal
- Years active: 1983–1988
- Labels: Discos Fuentes, Sonolux (es)
- Past members: Ramón Reinaldo Restrepo; Carlos Mario Pérez; John Jairo Martínez; Cipriano Álvarez

Parabellum was a Colombian extreme metal band from Medellín, active in the 1980s. Terrorizer described the band as one of the world's first black metal bands, the first Colombian extreme metal band, and one of the first from South America. According to Emilio Cuesta, Øystein "Euronymous" Aarseth—associated with the early Norwegian black metal scene—said Parabellum and Medellín's Reencarnación influenced Mayhem.

Drummer Cipriano Álvarez and guitarist Carlos Mario Pérez formed Parabellum in Medellín, Antioquia, in early 1983. The band released their debut single, the two-track Sacrilegio, limited to 500 copies, in 1987. They followed up with second EP Mutación por radiación in 1988, limited to 600 copies. Sacrilegio was reissued in 1992, again limited to 500 copies, and a bootlegged version surfaced with bonus track "Guerra, Monopolio, Sexo". Adam Ganderson of Terrorizer described their music as "somewhere between hardcore and bizarrely backwards speed metal riffing ... one of those inimitable sounds that can only be generated by accident. Seriously, this is some of the weirdest, most intense music ever to blast from the gutters." The band briefly appeared in Víctor Gaviria's film Rodrigo D: No Future.

Blasfemia Records released the Tempus Mortis compilation in 2005, consisting of the band's two EPs, six previously unreleased rehearsal tracks from 1984 to 1985, and a video track from the 1985 La Batalla de la Bandas festival. According to Zero Tolerance magazine, "the sound that Parabellum created was one of unprecedented nihilism, evil and extremity. [...] They were pioneers and sonic adventurers operating in a world of violence, squalor, and geographical isolation."

== Members ==
- Cipriano Álvarez (drums)
- John Jairo Martínez (guitar)
- Ramón Reinaldo Restrepo (vocals)
- Carlos Mario Pérez ("La Bruja") (guitar)

== Discography ==
- Sacrilegio (EP, Discos Fuentes, 1987)
- Mutación por radiación (EP, Sonolux, 1988)
- Tempus Mortis (compilation, Blasfemia, 2005)
