= Black metal =

Subgenre of heavy metal music

- Stylistic origins: Thrash metal; death metal; hardcore punk
- Cultural origins: Early to mid-1980s, England; Scandinavia
- Derivative forms: Dungeon synth

Subgenres
- Ambient black metal; folk black metal; industrial black metal; post-black metal (blackgaze); psychedelic black metal; raw black metal; symphonic black metal

Fusion genres
- Black 'n' roll; black-doom (depressive suicidal black metal); blackened crust (red and anarchist black metal); blackened death-doom; blackened death metal (melodic black-death; war metal); blackened grindcore; blackened thrash metal; pagan metal; Viking metal

Regional scenes
- Brazil; France; Finland; Greece; Norway; Poland; United States; Sweden

Local scenes
- Les Légions Noires; Early Norwegian scene

Other topics
- Shrieking; National Socialist black metal; unblack metal

Black metal is an extreme subgenre of heavy metal music. Common traits include fast tempos, a shrieking vocal style, heavily distorted guitars played with tremolo picking, raw (lo-fi) recording, unconventional song structures, and an emphasis on atmosphere. Artists often appear in corpse paint and adopt pseudonyms.

Venom initiated the "first wave" of black metal, with their 1982 album Black Metal giving it its name. In the following years, the style was developed by Bathory, Mercyful Fate, Hellhammer and Celtic Frost. By 1987, this wave had declined, but influential works were released by Tormentor, Sarcófago, Parabellum, Blasphemy, Samael and Rotting Christ. A "second wave" arose in the early 1990s, spearheaded by bands in the early Norwegian black metal scene, such as Mayhem, Darkthrone, Burzum, Immortal, Emperor, Satyricon and Gorgoroth. This Norwegian scene did much to define black metal as a distinct genre, and inspired other scenes in Finland (Beherit, Archgoat, Impaled Nazarene); Sweden (Dissection, Marduk, Abruptum, Nifelheim); the United States (Profanatica, Demoncy, Judas Iscariot, Grand Belial's Key); France (Mütiilation, Vlad Tepes); as well as leading to the founding of influential bands in other countries, including Sigh (Japan) and Cradle of Filth (England).

Black metal has often sparked controversy. Common themes in the genre are misanthropy, anti-Christianity, Satanism, and ethnic paganism. In the 1990s, members of the scene were responsible for a spate of church burnings and murders. There is also a small neo-Nazi movement within black metal, although it has been shunned by many prominent artists. Generally, black metal strives to remain an underground phenomenon.

== Characteristics ==
Although black metal now typically refers to the Norwegian style with shrieking vocals, the term has been applied to bands with widely differing sounds, such as the Greek and Finnish bands that emerged around the same time as the Norwegian scene.

=== Instrumentation and song structure ===
Manish Agarwal of Time Out describes black metal as "a cult strain of ultra-thrash" characterized by "icy noise". Norwegian-inspired black metal guitarists usually favor high-pitched or trebly guitar tones and heavy distortion. The guitar is usually played with fast, un-muted tremolo picking and power chords. Guitarists often use dissonance—along with specific scales, intervals and chord progressions—to create a sense of dread. The tritone, or flat-fifth, is often used. Guitar solos and low guitar tunings are rare in black metal. The bass guitar is seldom used to play stand-alone melodies. It is common for the bass to be muted against the guitar, or for it to homophonically follow the low-pitched riffs of the guitar. While electronic keyboards are not a standard instrument, some bands, like Dimmu Borgir, use keyboards "in the background" or as "proper instruments" for creating atmosphere. Some newer black metal bands began raising their production quality and introducing additional instruments such as synthesizers and even orchestras.

The drumming is usually fast and relies on double-bass and blast beats to maintain tempos that sometimes approach 300 beats per minute. These fast tempos require great skill and physical stamina, typified by black metal drummers Frost (Kjetil-Vidar Haraldstad) and Hellhammer (Jan Axel Blomberg). Even still, authenticity is still prioritized over technique. "This professionalism has to go," insists well-respected drummer Fenriz (Gylve Fenris Nagell) of Darkthrone. "I want to de-learn playing drums, I want to play primitive and simple, I don't want to play like a drum solo all the time and make these complicated riffs".

Black metal songs often stray from conventional song structure and often lack clear verse-chorus sections. Instead, many black metal songs contain lengthy and repetitive instrumental sections. The Greek style—established by Rotting Christ, Necromantia and Varathron—has more death metal traits than Norwegian black metal.

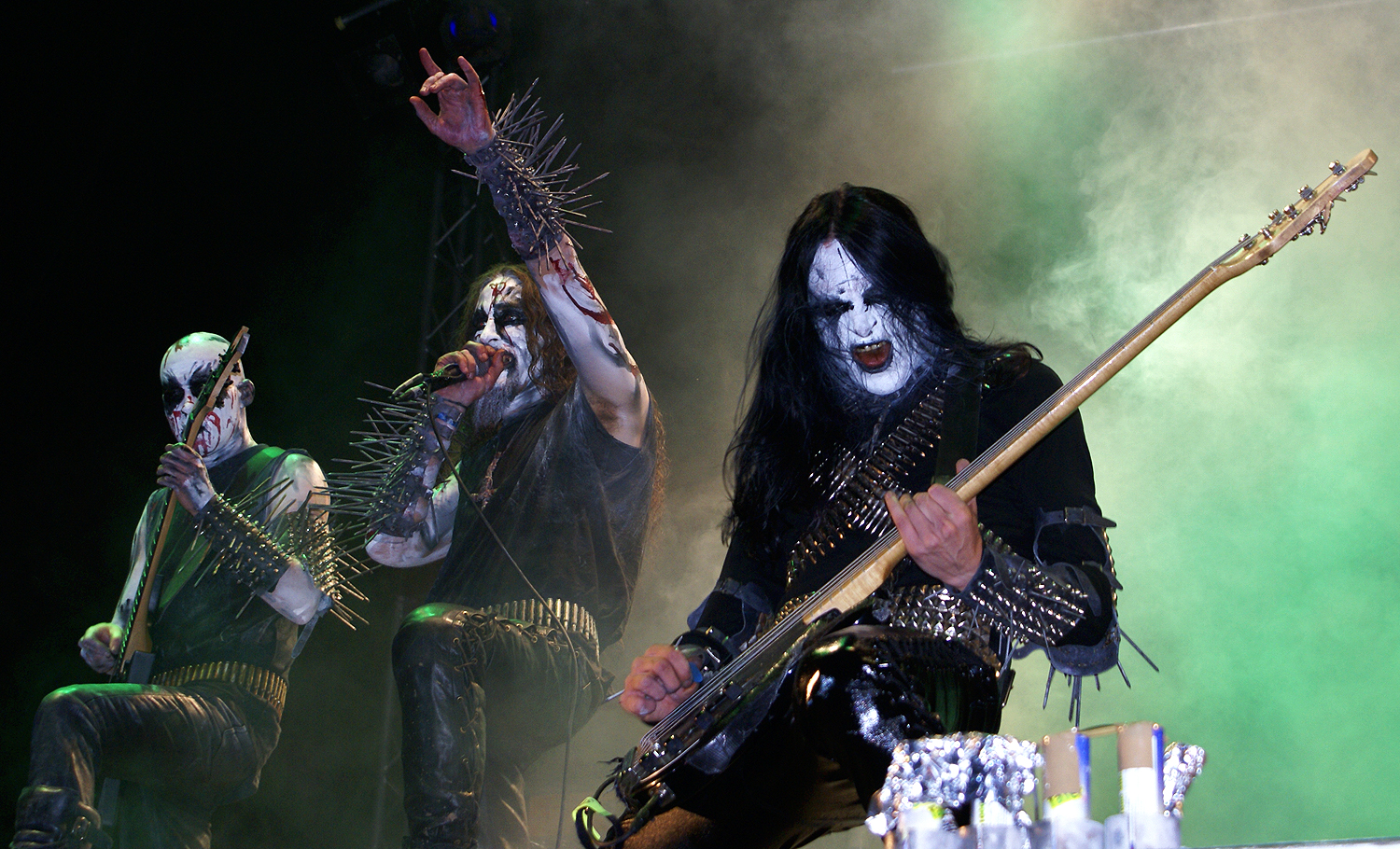
Members of Gorgoroth wearing typical black metal gear such as corpse paint, spikes and bullet belts. The band was formed by guitarist Infernus to express his Satanist beliefs.

=== Vocals and lyrics ===
Traditional black metal vocals are raspy and high-pitched, and include shrieking, screaming, and snarling. Death growls are sometimes used, but less often than the characteristic black metal shriek. Loudwire states that there is a distinct type of growl used in black metal known as "croaking", which the publication described as "a long, droning, deathly vocal that sounds as though it's coming from a reanimated corpse."

Manish Agarwal of Time Out describes the lyrical content of black metal as "sacrilegious bile". Typically, lyrics are against Christianity and other institutional religions, often using apocalyptic language and include anti-authoritarian and anti-establishment messages against religious governments. Satanic lyrics are common, and many see them as essential to black metal. For Satanist black metal artists, "Black metal songs are meant to be like Calvinist sermons; deadly serious attempts to unite the true believers". Misanthropy, global catastrophe, war, death and rebirth are also common themes. Another common theme is that of the wild and extreme aspects of the natural world, particularly the wilderness, forests, mountains, winter, storms, and blizzards. Black metal also has a fascination with the distant past. Many bands write about the mythology and folklore of their homelands and some promote a revival of pre-Christian, pagan traditions. A significant number of bands write lyrics only in their native language and a few (e.g. Arckanum and early Ulver) have lyrics in archaic languages. Some doom metal-influenced artists' lyrics focus on depression, nihilism, introspection, self-harm and suicide.

=== Imagery and performances ===
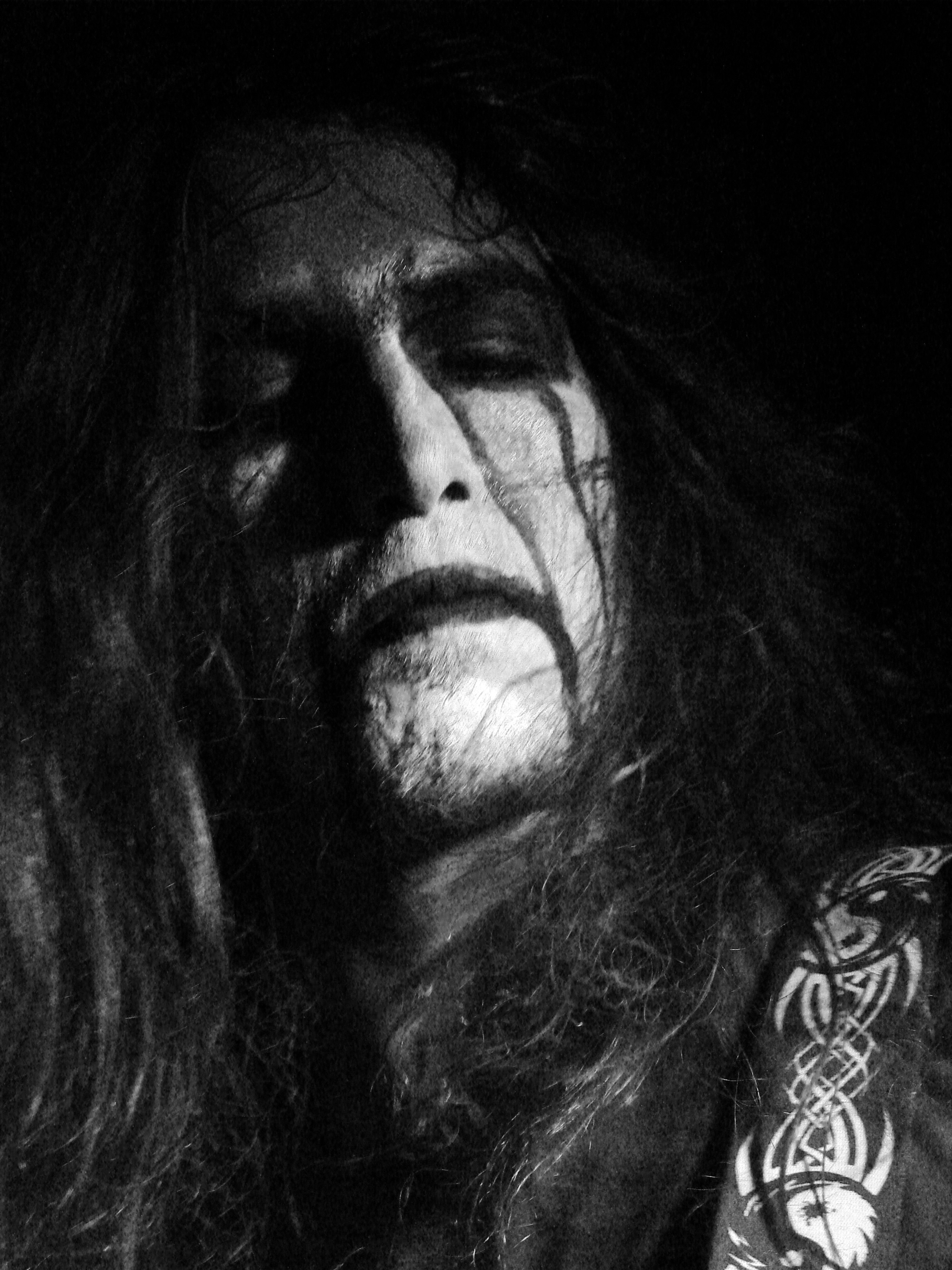
A common black metal convention is the use of corpse paint, black-and-white make-up intended to make the wearer look inhuman, corpse-like, or demonic. Shown here: Taalroth of French pagan band Hindvir.

Black metal is known for having spawned many of the most demonic, wild, and dedicated frontmen. After all, black metal is more than a genre; it's a lifestyle.

— Jillian Drachman of Loudwire (April 16, 2025)

Many bands choose not to play live. Many of those who do play live maintain that their performances "are not for entertainment or spectacle. Sincerity, authenticity and extremity are valued above all else". Some bands consider their concerts to be rituals and often make use of stage props and theatrics. Bands such as Mayhem, Gorgoroth, and Watain are noted for their controversial shows, which have featured impaled animal heads, mock crucifixions, medieval weaponry and band members doused in animal blood. A few vocalists, such as Dead, Maniac and Kvarforth, are known for cutting themselves while singing onstage.

Black metal artists often appear dressed in black with combat boots, bullet belts, spiked wristbands and inverted crosses and inverted pentagrams. However, the "definitive visual element" of black metal is the use of corpse paint—black and white face paint sometimes mixed with real or fake blood, which is used to create a "monstrous or ghoulish" appearance.

Black metal has a distinct imagery. In the early 1990s, most pioneering black metal artists had minimalist album covers featuring xeroxed black-and-white pictures and logos. This was partly a reaction against death metal bands, who at that time had begun to use brightly colored album artwork. Many purist black metal artists have continued this style. Black metal album covers are typically dark and tend to be atmospheric or provocative; some feature natural or fantasy landscapes (for example Burzum's Filosofem and Emperor's In the Nightside Eclipse) while others are violent, sexually transgressive, sacrilegious, or iconoclastic (for example Marduk's Fuck Me Jesus and Dimmu Borgir's In Sorte Diaboli).

=== Production ===
The earliest black metal artists had very limited resources, which meant that recordings were often made in homes or basements, giving their recordings a distinctive "lo-fi" quality. However, even when success allowed access to professional studios, many artists instead chose to continue making lo-fi recordings. Artists believed that by doing so, they would both stay true to the genre's underground roots as well as make the music sound more "raw" or "cold". A well-known example of this approach is on the album Transilvanian Hunger by Darkthrone, a band who Johnathan Selzer of Terrorizer magazine considers to "represent the DIY aspect of black metal." In addition, lo-fi production was used to keep black metal inaccessible or unappealing to mainstream music fans and those who are not committed. Many have claimed that black metal was originally intended only for those who were part of the scene and not for a wider audience. Former Gorgoroth vocalist Gaahl said that during the genre's infancy, black metal "was never meant to reach [a wide] audience," and that creating it was "purely for [the members of the scene's] own satisfaction."

== History ==
=== Roots ===
Occult and Satanic themes were present in the music of heavy metal and rock bands of the late 1960s and early 1970s, such as Black Sabbath and Coven.

In the late 1970s, the rough and aggressive heavy metal played by the British band Motörhead gained popularity. Many first-wave black metal bands cited Motörhead as an influence. Also popular in the late 1970s, punk rock came to influence the birth of black metal. Tom G. Warrior of Hellhammer and Celtic Frost credited English punk group Discharge as "a revolution, much like Venom", saying, "When I heard the first two Discharge records, I was blown away. I was just starting to play an instrument and I had no idea you could go so far."

The use of corpse paint in black metal was mainly influenced by the American 1970s rock band Kiss.

=== First wave (1982–1990) ===
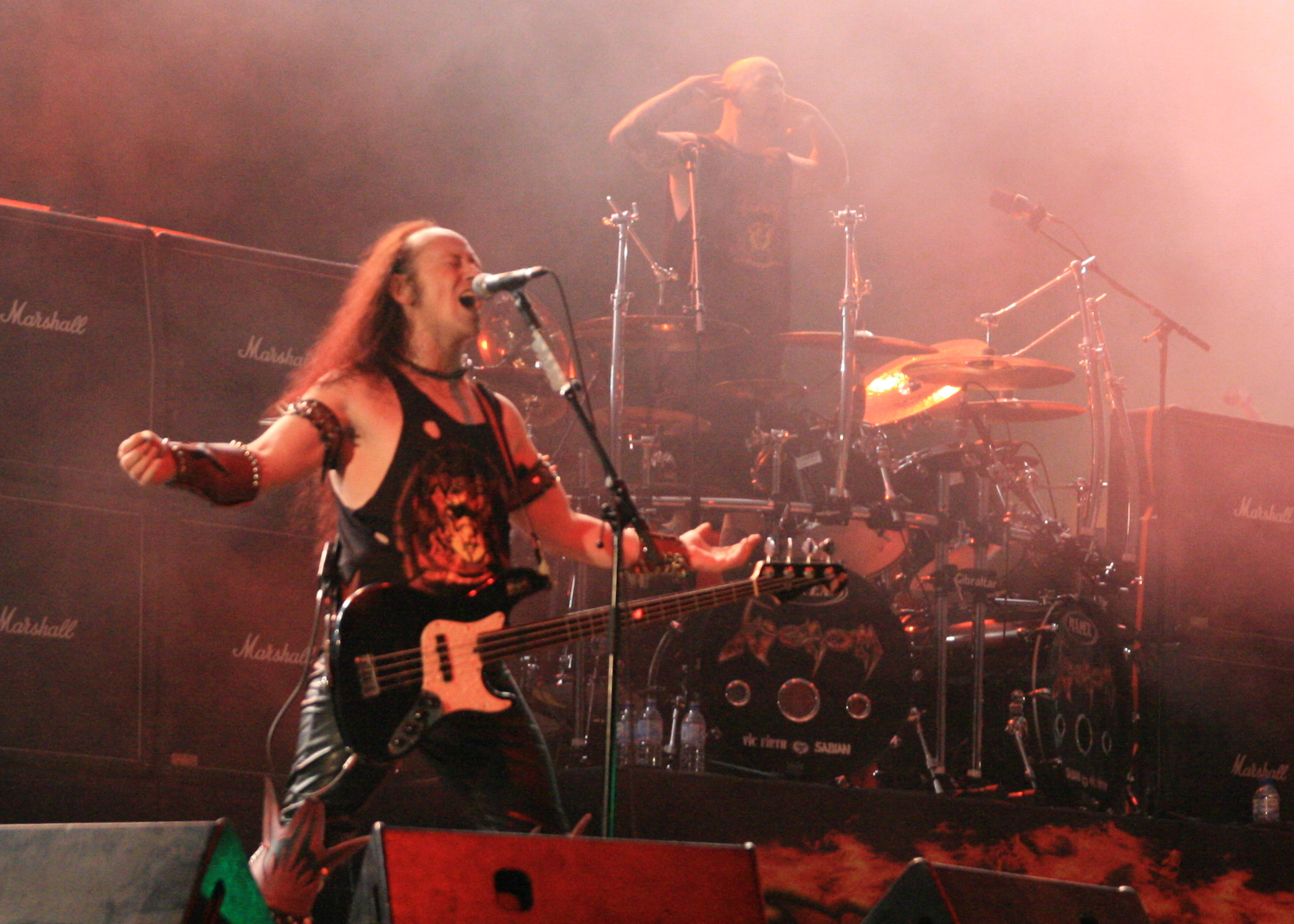
Venom's second album, Black Metal, inspired the name of the genre.

The term "black metal" was coined by the English band Venom with their second album Black Metal (1982). Playing a style of speed metal or proto-thrash metal, the album initiated the "first wave of black metal". The band introduced many metaphors that became rampant in the genre, such as blasphemous lyrics and imagery, as well as stage names, costumes and face paint. During this "first wave" of bands, black metal and other extreme metal styles like death metal were not well-defined genres.

Swiss band Hellhammer made "truly raw and brutal music" with Satanic lyrics, and became an important influence on black metal. They recorded three demos in 1983 and released an EP in April 1984. Hellhammer then transformed into Celtic Frost and released their first album, Morbid Tales, later that year. With their second album, To Mega Therion (1985), the band began to explore "more orchestral and experimental territories." In these first years, Celtic Frost was considered one of the world's most extreme and original metal bands, significantly influencing the black metal genre.

Swedish band Bathory created "the blueprint for Scandinavian black metal" and have been described as "the biggest inspiration for the Norwegian black metal movement of the early nineties". Their songs first appeared on the compilation Scandinavian Metal Attack in March 1984, which drew much attention to the band, and they released their first album that October. Bathory's music was dark, raw, exceptionally fast, heavily distorted, and anti-Christian, and frontman Quorthon pioneered the shrieked vocals that later came to define black metal. Their third album Under the Sign of the Black Mark (1987) was described by journalist Dayal Patterson as creating "the black metal sound as we know it".

The Danish band Mercyful Fate influenced the Norwegian scene with their imagery and lyrics. Frontman King Diamond, who wore ghoulish black-and-white facepaint on stage, may be one of the inspirators of what became known as 'corpse paint'. Other artists that were a part of this wave included Germany's Sodom, Kreator and Destruction, Italy's Bulldozer and Death SS, and Japan's Sabbat.

In 1987, in the fifth issue of his Slayer fanzine, Jon 'Metalion' Kristiansen wrote that "the latest fad of black/Satanic bands seems to be over", citing United States bands Incubus and Morbid Angel, as well as Sabbat from Great Britain as some of the few continuing the genre. However, black metal continued in the underground, with scenes developing in Brazil with Sepultura, Vulcano, Holocausto and Sarcófago; in Czechoslovakia with Root, Törr and Master's Hammer; and Sweden with Grotesque, Merciless, Mefisto, Tiamat and Morbid. Sarcófago's debut album I.N.R.I. (1987), was widely influential on subsequent acts in the genre, especially the second wave Norwegian scene and groups in the war metal style. BrooklynVegan writer Kim Kelly calling it "a gigantic influence on black metal's sound, aesthetics, and attitude." Furthermore, during this time other influential records in the genre were released by Tormentor (from Hungary), Parabellum (from Colombia), Von (from the United States), Rotting Christ (from Greece), Mortuary Drape (from Italy), Kat (from Poland), Samael (from Switzerland) and Blasphemy (from Canada). Blasphemy's debut album Fallen Angel of Doom (1990) is considered one of the most influential records for the war metal style. Fenriz of the Norwegian band Darkthrone called Master's Hammer's debut album Ritual "the first Norwegian black metal album, even though they are from Czechoslovakia". It was only during this post–1987 era of bands that the various extreme metal styles began to become more distinct from one another, and the borders were drawn of what is now understood as black metal.

=== Second wave (1991–1997) ===
The second wave of black metal began in the early 1990s. It is generally deemed to have begun with the early Norwegian black metal scene, although Rock Hard magazine credits Samael's Worship Him (1 April 1991) as its beginning.

==== Norwegian scene ====
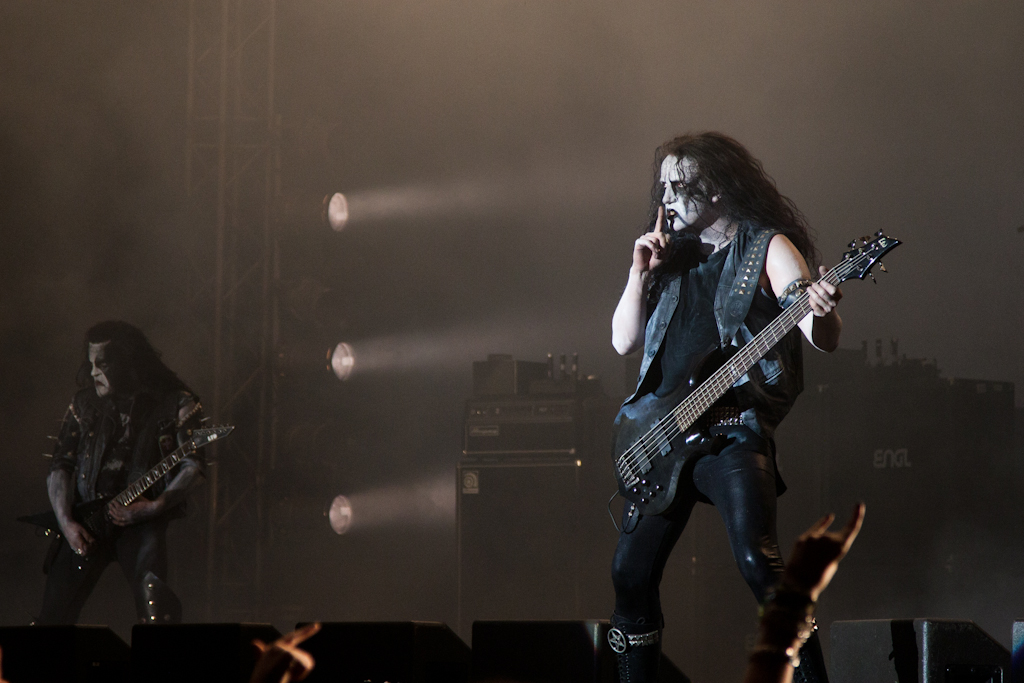
Norwegian band Immortal influenced countless bands in the genre

During 1990–1993, a number of Norwegian artists began performing and releasing a new kind of black metal music; this included Mayhem, Darkthrone, Burzum, Immortal, Emperor, Satyricon, Enslaved, Thorns, and Gorgoroth. They crystallized the styles of the "first wave" bands into a distinct genre, popularizing a style of guitar playing developed by Snorre 'Blackthorn' Ruch and Øystein 'Euronymous' Aarseth. Fenriz of Darkthrone described it as being "derived from Bathory" and noted that "those kinds of riffs became the new order for a lot of bands in the '90s".

The wearing of corpse paint became standard, and was a way for many black metal artists to distinguish themselves from other metal bands of the era. The scene also had an ideology and ethos. Artists were bitterly opposed to Christianity and presented themselves as misanthropic Devil worshippers who wanted to spread terror, hatred and evil. They professed to be serious in their views and vowed to act on them. Ihsahn of Emperor said that they sought to "create fear among people" and "be in opposition to society". The scene was exclusive and created boundaries around itself, incorporating only those who were "true" and attempting to expel all "poseurs". Some members of the scene were responsible for a spate of church burnings and murder, which eventually drew attention to it and led to a number of artists being imprisoned.

===== Dead's suicide =====
On 8 April 1991, Mayhem vocalist Per "Dead" Ohlin committed suicide while left alone in a house shared by the band. Fellow musicians described Dead as odd, introverted and depressed. Mayhem's drummer, Hellhammer, said that Dead was the first to wear the distinctive corpse paint that became widespread in the scene. He was found with slit wrists and a shotgun wound to the head. Dead's suicide note began with "Excuse all the blood", and apologized for firing the weapon indoors. Before calling the police, Euronymous got a disposable camera and photographed the body, after re-arranging some items. One of these photographs was later used as the cover of a bootleg live album, Dawn of the Black Hearts.

Euronymous made necklaces with bits of Dead's skull and gave some to musicians he deemed worthy. Rumors also spread that he had made a stew with bits of his brain. Euronymous used Dead's suicide to foster Mayhem's evil image and claimed Dead had killed himself because extreme metal had become trendy and commercialized. Mayhem bassist Jørn 'Necrobutcher' Stubberud noted that "people became more aware of the black metal scene after Dead had shot himself ... I think it was Dead's suicide that really changed the scene". Metal Hammer writer Enrico Ahlig suggests that the notoriety surrounding the suicide marked the beginning of the second wave of black metal.

===== Helvete and Deathlike Silence =====
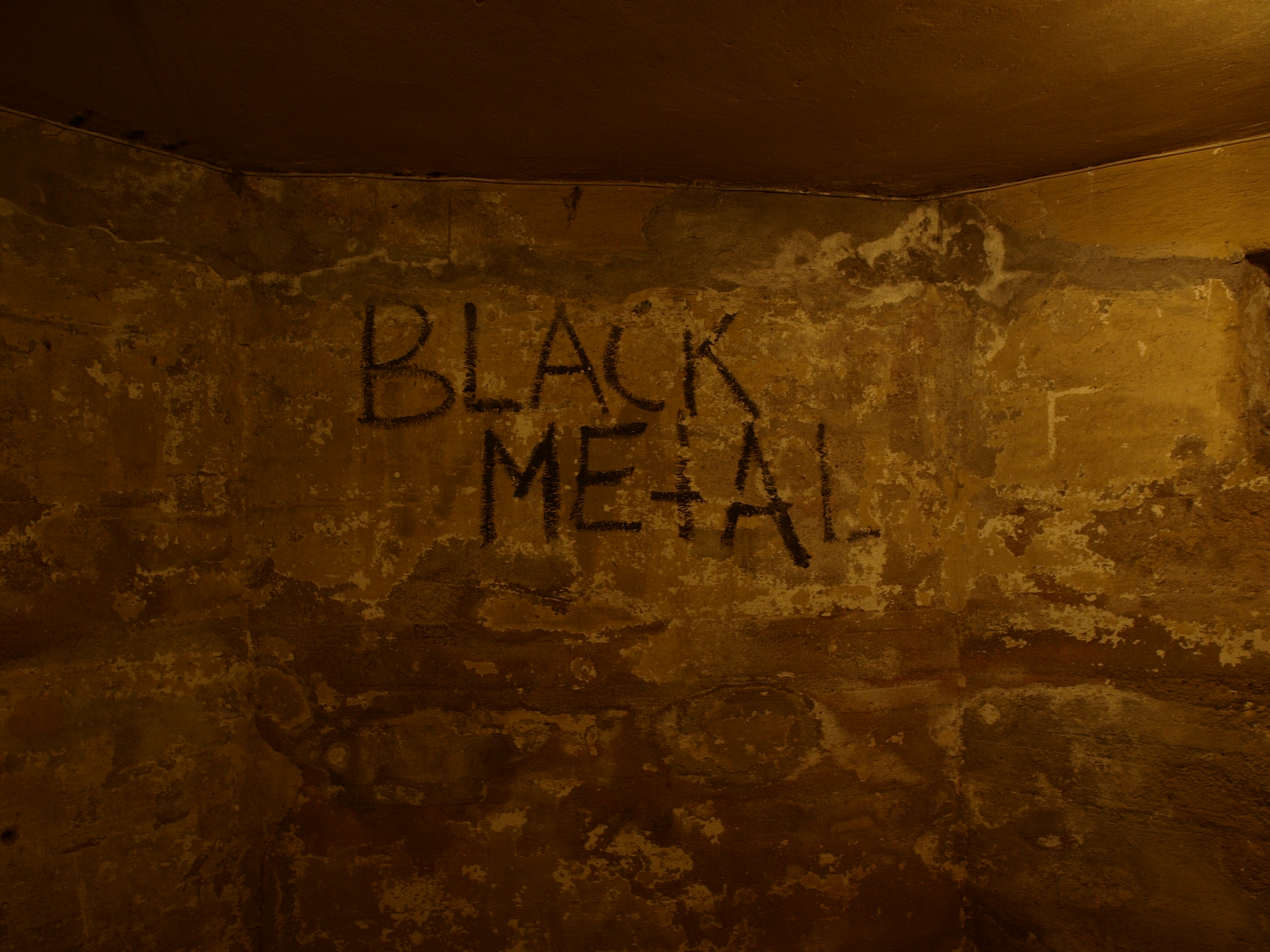
The basement of Helvete, showing graffiti from the early 1990s

During May–June 1991, Euronymous of Mayhem opened an independent record shop named "Helvete" (Norwegian for "Hell") in Oslo. It quickly became the focal point of Norway's emerging black metal scene and a meeting place for many of its musicians; especially the members of Mayhem, Burzum, Emperor and Thorns. Jon 'Metalion' Kristiansen, writer of the fanzine Slayer, said that the opening of Helvete was "the creation of the whole Norwegian black metal scene". In its basement, Euronymous founded an independent record label named Deathlike Silence Productions. With the rising popularity of his band and others like it, the underground success of Euronymous's label is often credited for encouraging other record labels, who had previously shunned black metal acts, to then reconsider and release their material.

===== Church burnings =====
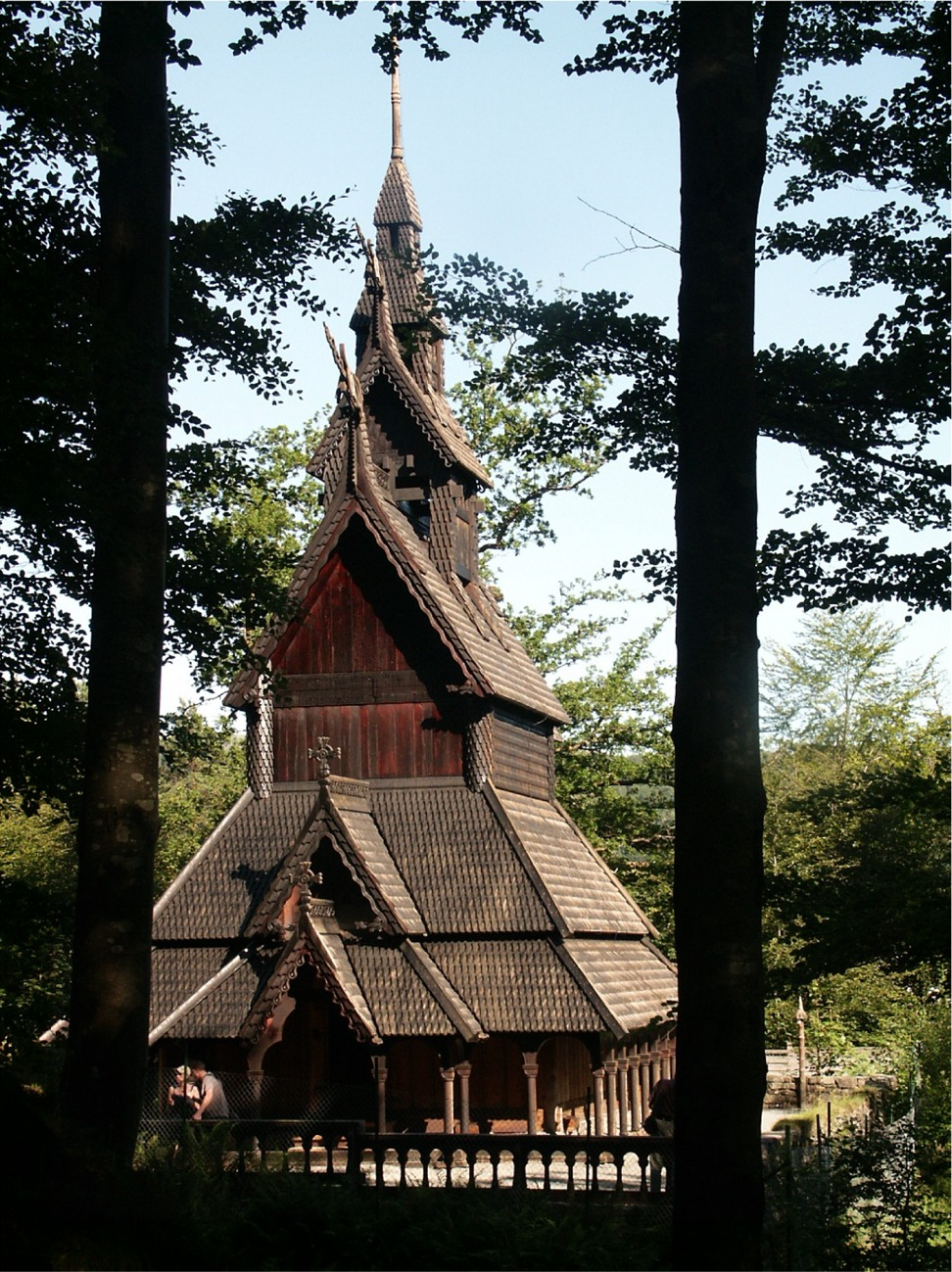
The Fantoft Stave Church, restored in 1997.

In 1992, members of the Norwegian black metal scene began a wave of arson attacks on Christian churches. By 1996, there had been at least 50 such attacks in Norway. Some of the buildings were hundreds of years old and seen as important historical landmarks. The first to be burnt down was Norway's Fantoft Stave Church. Police believe Varg Vikernes of Burzum was responsible. The cover of Burzum's EP Aske ("ashes") is a photograph of the destroyed church. In May 1994, Vikernes was found guilty for burning down the Holmenkollen Chapel, Skjold Church, and Åsane Church. In addition, he was found guilty for an attempted arson of a fourth church, and for the theft and storage of 150 kg of explosives. To coincide with the release of Mayhem's De Mysteriis Dom Sathanas, Vikernes and Euronymous had also allegedly plotted to bomb the Nidaros Cathedral, which appears on the album cover. The musicians Faust, Samoth, (both of Emperor), and Jørn Inge Tunsberg (of Hades Almighty) were also convicted for church arsons. Members of the Swedish black metal scene started to burn churches as well in 1993.

Those convicted for church burnings showed no remorse and described their actions as a symbolic "retaliation" against Christianity in Norway. Mayhem drummer Hellhammer said he had called for attacks on mosques and Hindu temples, on the basis that they were more foreign. Today, opinions on the church burnings differ within the black metal community. Many members of the early Norwegian scene, such as Infernus and Gaahl of Gorgoroth, continue to praise the church burnings, with the latter saying "there should have been more of them, and there will be more of them". Others, such as Necrobutcher and Kjetil Manheim of Mayhem and Abbath of Immortal, see the church burnings as having been futile. Manheim said that many arsons were "just people trying to gain acceptance" within the black metal scene. Watain vocalist Erik Danielsson respected the attacks, but said of those responsible: "the only Christianity they defeated was the last piece of Christianity within themselves. Which is a very good beginning, of course".

===== Murder of Euronymous =====
In early 1993, animosity arose between Euronymous and Vikernes. On the night of 10 August 1993, Varg Vikernes (of Burzum) and Snorre 'Blackthorn' Ruch (of Thorns) drove from Bergen to Euronymous's apartment in Oslo. When they arrived a confrontation began and Vikernes stabbed Euronymous to death. His body was found outside the apartment with 23 cut wounds—two to the head, five to the neck, and sixteen to the back.

It has been speculated that the murder was the result of either a power struggle, a financial dispute over Burzum records or an attempt at outdoing a stabbing in Lillehammer the year before by Faust. Vikernes denies all of these, claiming that he attacked Euronymous in self-defense. He says that Euronymous had plotted to stun him with an electroshock weapon, tie him up and torture him to death while videotaping the event. He said Euronymous planned to use a meeting about an unsigned contract to ambush him. Vikernes claims he intended to hand Euronymous the signed contract that night and "tell him to fuck off", but that Euronymous panicked and attacked him first. He also claims that most of the cuts were from broken glass Euronymous had fallen on during the struggle. The self-defense story is doubted by Faust, while Necrobutcher confirmed that Vikernes killed Euronymous in self-defense due to the death threats he received from him.

Vikernes was arrested on 19 August 1993, in Bergen. Many other members of the scene were taken in for questioning around the same time. Some of them confessed to their crimes and implicated others. In May 1994, Vikernes was sentenced to 21 years in prison (Norway's maximum penalty) for the murder of Euronymous, the arson of four churches, and for possession of 150 kg of explosives. However, he only confessed to the latter. Two churches were burnt the day he was sentenced, "presumably as a statement of symbolic support". Vikernes smiled when his verdict was read and the picture was widely reprinted in the news media. Blackthorn was sentenced to eight years in prison for being an accomplice to the murder. That month saw the release of Mayhem's album De Mysteriis Dom Sathanas, which featured Euronymous on guitar and Vikernes on bass guitar. Euronymous's family had asked Mayhem's drummer, Hellhammer, to remove the bass tracks recorded by Vikernes, but Hellhammer said: "I thought it was appropriate that the murderer and victim were on the same record. I put word out that I was re-recording the bass parts. But I never did". In 2003, Vikernes failed to return to Tønsberg prison after being given a short leave. He was re-arrested shortly after while driving a stolen car with various weapons. Vikernes was released on parole in 2009.

==== Outside of Norway ====
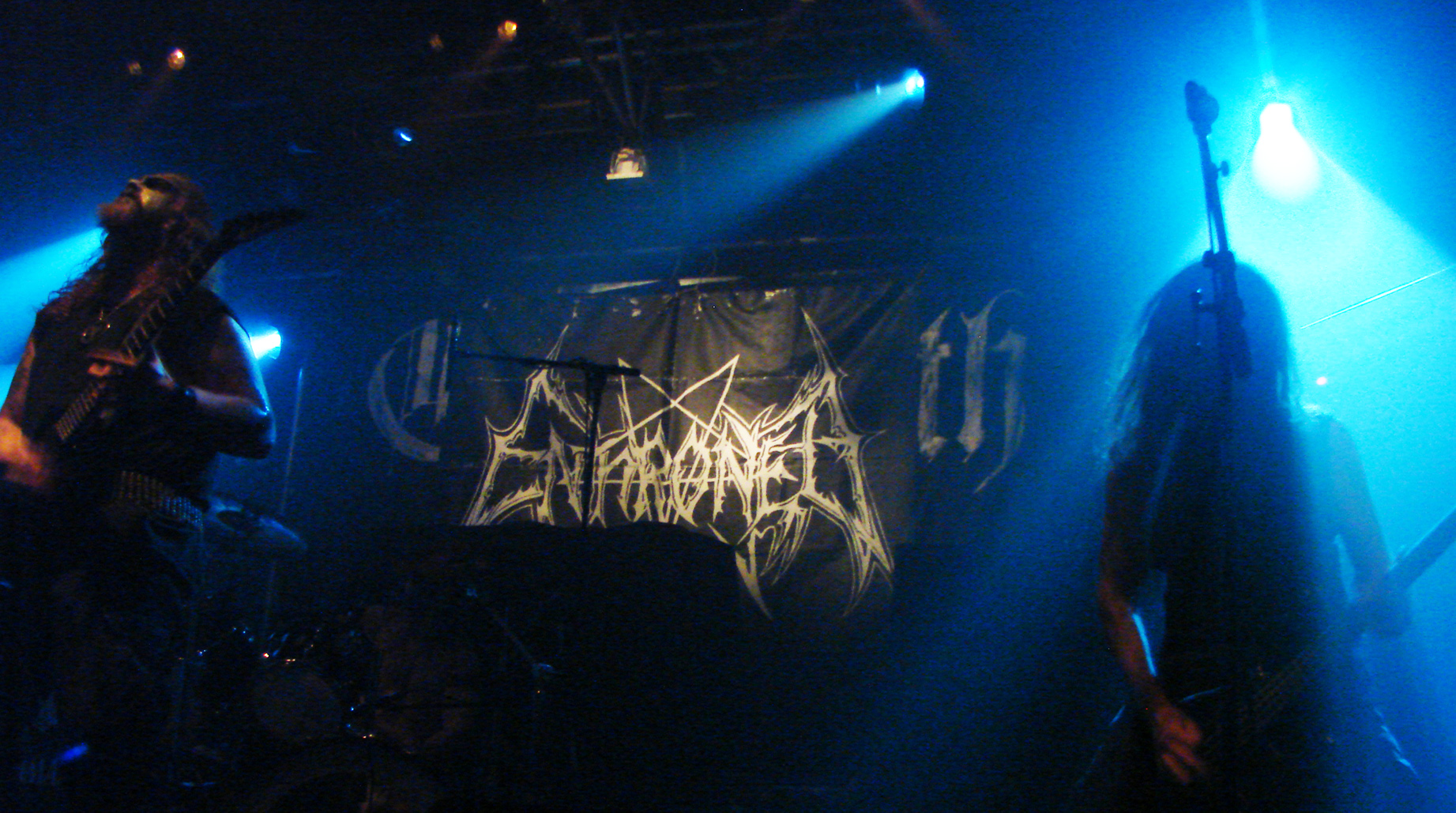
Enthroned from Belgium

Japanese band Sigh formed in 1990 and was in regular contact with key members of the Norwegian scene. Their debut album, Scorn Defeat, became "a cult classic in the black metal world".

In 1990 and 1991, Northern European metal acts began to release music influenced by these bands or the older ones from the first wave. In Sweden, this included Dissection, Abruptum, Marduk, and Nifelheim. In Finland, there emerged a scene that mixed the first-wave black metal style with elements of death metal and grindcore; this included Beherit, Archgoat and Impaled Nazarene, whose debut album Tol Cormpt Norz Norz Norz Rock Hard journalist Wolf-Rüdiger Mühlmann considers a part of war metal's roots. Bands such as Demoncy and Profanatica emerged during this time in the United States, when death metal was more popular among extreme metal fans. The Norwegian band Mayhem's concert in Leipzig with Eminenz and Manos in 1990, later released as Live in Leipzig, was said to have had a strong influence on the East German scene and is even called the unofficial beginning of German black metal.

Black metal scenes also emerged on the European mainland during the early 1990s, inspired by the Norwegian scene or the older bands, or both. In Poland, a scene was spearheaded by Graveland and Behemoth. In France, a close-knit group of musicians known as Les Légions Noires emerged; this included artists such as Mütiilation, Vlad Tepes, Belketre and Torgeist. In Belgium, there were acts such as Ancient Rites and Enthroned. Bands such as Black Funeral, Grand Belial's Key and Judas Iscariot emerged during this time in the United States. The main member of Black Funeral, Michael W. Ford, has been associated with a variety of esoteric groups and written numerous books on esoteric topics.

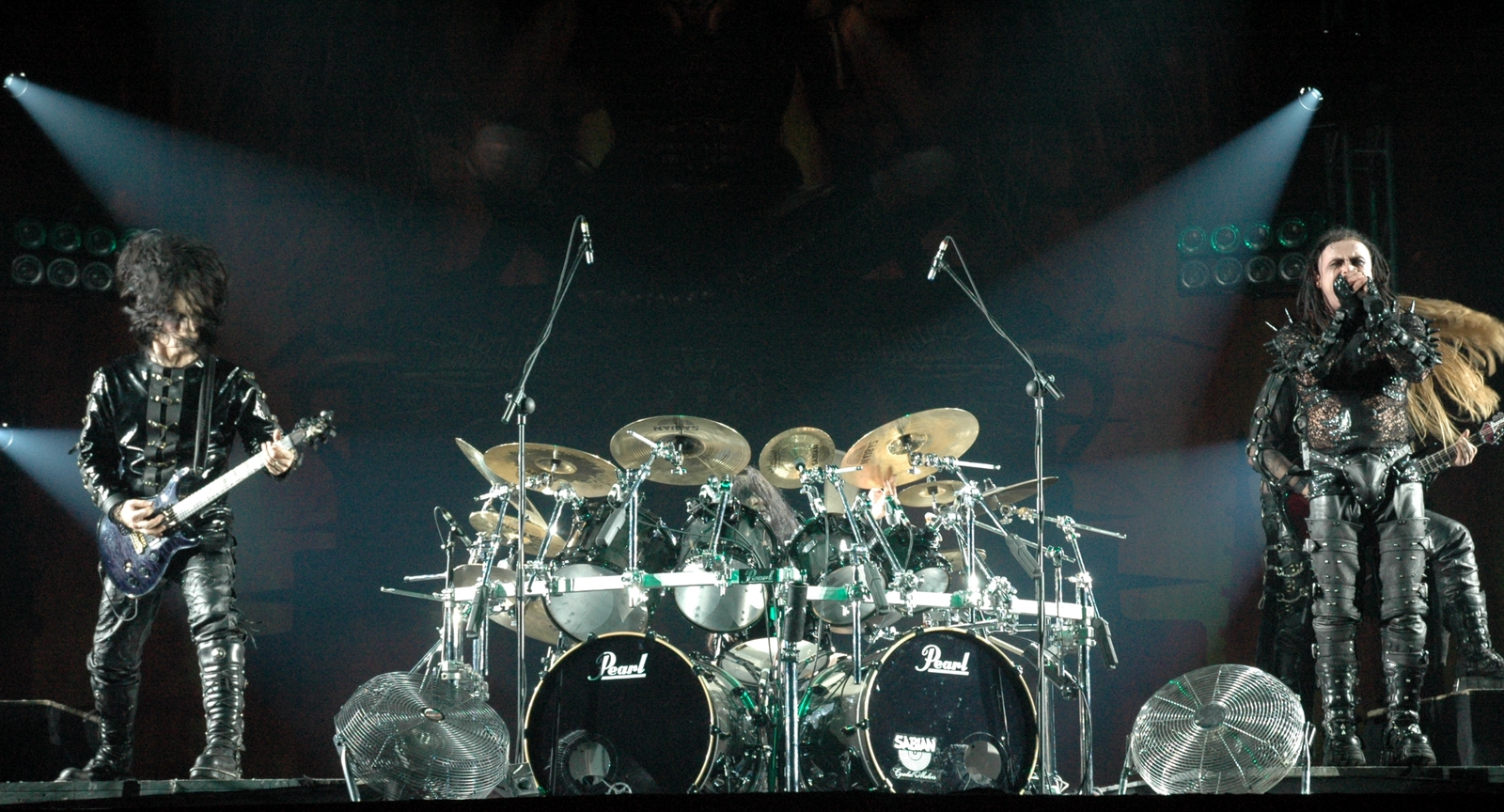
English band Cradle of Filth performing at Metalmania in 2005

A notable black metal group in England was Cradle of Filth, who released three demos in a black/death metal style with symphonic flourishes, followed by the album The Principle of Evil Made Flesh, which featured a then-unusual hybrid style of black and gothic metal. The band then abandoned black metal for gothic metal, becoming one of the most successful extreme metal bands to date. John Serba of AllMusic commented that their first album "made waves in the early black metal scene, putting Cradle of Filth on the tips of metalheads' tongues, whether in praise of the band's brazen attempts to break the black metal mold or in derision for its 'commercialization' of an underground phenomenon that was proud of its grimy heritage". Some black metal fans did not consider Cradle of Filth to be black metal. When asked if he considers Cradle of Filth a black metal band, vocalist Dani Filth said he considers them black metal in terms of philosophy and atmosphere, but not in other ways. Another English band called Necropolis never released any music, but "began a desecratory assault against churches and cemeteries in their area" and "almost caused Black Metal to be banned in Britain as a result". Dayal Patterson says successful acts like Cradle of Filth "provoked an even greater extremity [of negative opinion] from the underground" scene due to concerns about "selling out".

The controversy surrounding the Thuringian band Absurd drew attention to the German black metal scene. In 1993, the members murdered a boy from their school, Sandro Beyer. A photo of Beyer's gravestone is on the cover of one of their demos, Thuringian Pagan Madness, along with pro-Nazi statements. It was recorded in prison and released in Poland by Graveland drummer Capricornus. The band's early music was more influenced by Oi! and Rock Against Communism (RAC) than by black metal, and described as being "more akin to '60s garage punk than some of the […] Black Metal of their contemporaries". Alexander von Meilenwald from German band Nagelfar considers Ungod's 1993 debut Circle of the Seven Infernal Pacts, Desaster's 1994 demo Lost in the Ages, Tha-Norr's 1995 album Wolfenzeitalter, Lunar Aurora's 1996 debut Weltengänger and Katharsis's 2000 debut 666 to be the most important recordings for the German scene. He said they were "not necessarily the best German releases, but they all kicked off something".

=== After the second wave (1998–present) ===
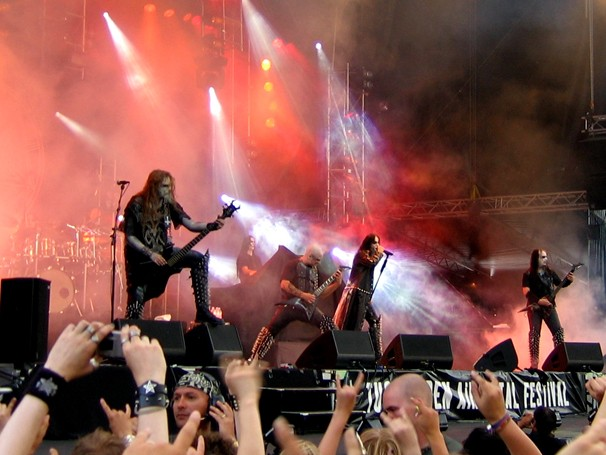
Dimmu Borgir's music features synthesizers and orchestras

In the beginning of the second wave, the different scenes developed their own styles; as Alan 'Nemtheanga' Averill says, "you had the Greek sound and the Finnish sound, and the Norwegian sound, and there was German bands and Swiss bands and that kind of thing." By the mid-1990s, the style of the Norwegian scene was being adopted by bands worldwide, and in 1998, Kerrang! journalist Malcolm Dome said that "black metal as we know it in 1998 owes more to Norway and to Scandinavia than any other particular country". Newer black metal bands also began raising their production quality and introducing additional instruments such as synthesizers and even full-symphony orchestras. By the late 1990s, the underground concluded that several of the Norwegian pioneers—like Emperor, Immortal, Dimmu Borgir, Ancient, Covenant/The Kovenant, and Satyricon—had commercialized or sold out to the mainstream and "big bastard labels." Dayal Patterson states that successful acts like Dimmu Borgir "provoked an even greater extremity [of negative opinion] from the underground" regarding the view that these bands had "sold out."

After Euronymous's death, "some bands went more towards the Viking metal and epic style, while some bands went deeper into the abyss." Since 1993, the Swedish scene had carried out church burnings, grave desecration, and other violent acts. In 1995, Jon Nödtveidt of Dissection joined the Misanthropic Luciferian Order (MLO). In 1997, he and another MLO member were arrested and charged with shooting dead a 37-year-old man. It was said he was killed "out of anger" because he had "harassed" the two men. Nödtveidt received a 10-year sentence. As the victim was a homosexual immigrant, Dissection was accused of being a Nazi band, but Nödtveidt denied this and dismissed racism and nationalism.

The Swedish band Shining, founded in 1996, began writing music almost exclusively about depression and suicide, musically inspired by Strid and by Burzum's albums Hvis lyset tar oss and Filosofem. Vocalist Niklas Kvarforth wanted to "force-feed" his listeners "with self-destructive and suicidal imagery and lyrics." In the beginning, he used the term "suicidal black metal" for his music. However, he stopped using the term in 2001 because it had begun to be used by a slew of other bands, whom he felt had misinterpreted his vision and were using the music as a kind of therapy rather than a weapon against the listener as Kvarforth intended. He said that he "wouldn't call Shining a black metal band" and called the "suicidal black metal" term a "foolish idea."

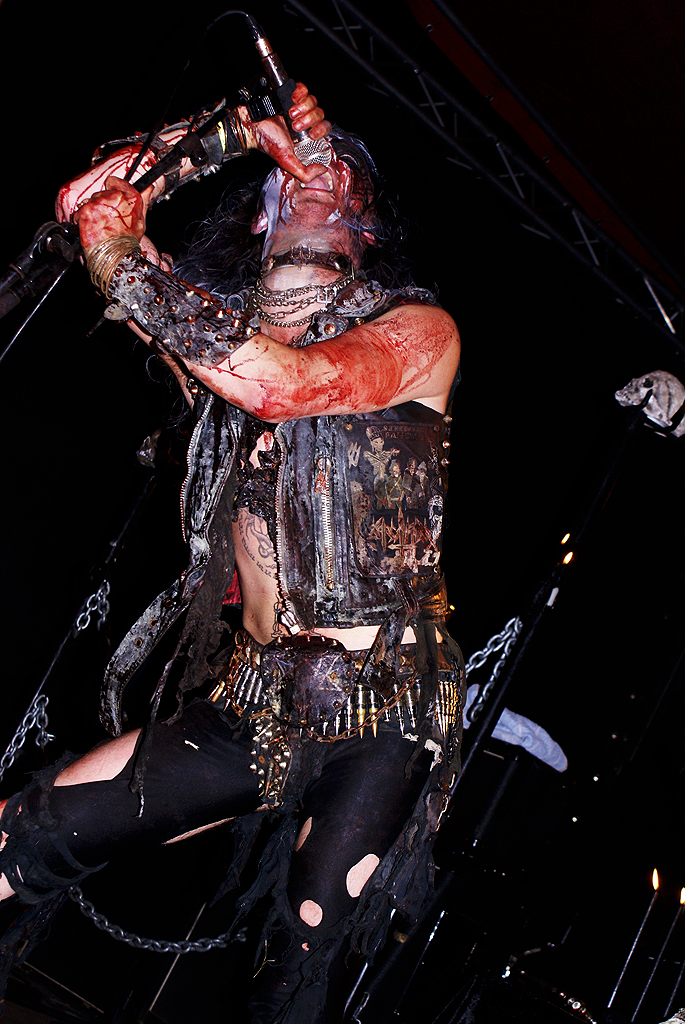
Watain singer Erik Danielsson in torn clothes and covered with blood

According to Erik Danielsson, when his band Watain formed in 1998, there were very few bands who took black metal as seriously as the early Norwegian scene had. A newer generation of Swedish Satanic bands like Watain and Ondskapt, inspired by Ofermod, the new band of Nefandus member Belfagor, put this scene "into a new light." Kvarforth said, "It seems like people actually [got] afraid again." "The current Swedish black metal scene has a particularly ambitious and articulate understanding of mysticism and its validity to black metal. Many Swedish black metal bands, most notably Watain and Dissection, are [or were] affiliated with the Temple of the Black Light, or Misanthropic Luciferian Order […] a Theistic, Gnostic, Satanic organization based in Sweden". Upon his release in 2004, Jon Nödtveidt restarted Dissection with new members whom he felt were able to "stand behind and live up to the demands of Dissection's Satanic concept." He started calling Dissection "the sonic propaganda unit of the MLO" and released a third full-length album, Reinkaos. The lyrics contain magical formulae from the Liber Azerate and are based on the organization's teachings. After the album's release and a few concerts, Nödtveidt said that he had "reached the limitations of music as a tool for expressing what I want to express, for myself and the handful of others that I care about" and disbanded Dissection before dying by suicide.

A part of the underground scene adopted a Jungian interpretation of the church burnings and other acts of the early scene as the re-emergence of ancient archetypes, which Kadmon of Allerseelen and the authors of Lords of Chaos had implied in their writings. They mixed this interpretation with Paganism and Nationalism. Varg Vikernes was seen as "an ideological messiah" by some, although Vikernes had disassociated himself from black metal and his neo-Nazism had nothing to do with that subculture. This led to the rise of National Socialist black metal (NSBM), which Hendrik Möbus of Absurd calls "the logical conclusion" of the Norwegian black metal "movement". Other parts of the scene oppose NSBM as it is "indelibly linked with Asá Trŭ and opposed to Satanism", or look upon Nazism "with vague skepticism and indifference". Members of the NSBM scene, among others, see the Norwegian bands as poseurs whose "ideology is cheap", although they still respect Vikernes and Burzum, whom Grand Belial's Key vocalist Richard Mills called "the only Norwegian band that remains unapologetic and literally convicted of his beliefs."

In France, besides Les Légions Noires (The Black Legions), an NSBM scene arose. Members of French band Funeral desecrated a grave in Toulon in June 1996, and a 19-year-old black metal fan stabbed a priest to death in Mulhouse on Christmas Eve 1996. According to MkM of Antaeus and Aosoth, the early French scene "was quite easy to divide: either you were NSBM, and you had the support from zine and the audience, or you were part of the black legions, and you had that 'cult' aura", whereas his band Antaeus, not belonging to either of these sub-scenes, "did not fit anywhere." Many French bands, like Deathspell Omega and Aosoth, have an avantgarde approach and a disharmonic sound that is representative of that scene.

The early American black metal bands remained underground. Some of them—like Grand Belial's Key and Judas Iscariot—joined an international NSBM organization called the Pagan Front, although Judas Iscariot's sole member Akhenaten left the organization. Other bands like Averse Sefira never had any link with Nazism. The US bands have no common style. Many were musically inspired by Burzum but did not necessarily adopt Vikernes's ideas. Profanatica's music is close to death metal, while Demoncy were accused of ripping off Gorgoroth riffs. There also emerged bands like Xasthur and Leviathan (whose music is inspired by Burzum and whose lyrics focus on topics such as depression and suicide), Nachtmystium, Krallice, Wolves in the Throne Room (a band linked to the crust punk scene and the environmental movement), and Liturgy (the style of whom frontwoman Ravenna Hunt-Hendrix describes as 'transcendental black metal'). These bands eschew black metal's traditional lyrical content for "something more Whitman-esque" and have been rejected by some traditional black-metallers for their ideologies and the post-rock and shoegazing influences some of them have adopted. Also, some bands like Agalloch started to incorporate "doom and folk elements into the traditional blast-beat and tremolo-picking of the Scandinavian incarnation", a style that later became known as Cascadian black metal, in reference to the region where it emerged.

In Australia, a scene led by bands like Deströyer 666, Vomitor, Hobbs' Angel of Death, Nocturnal Graves and Gospel of the Horns arose. This scene's typical style is a mixture of old school black metal and raw thrash metal influenced by old Celtic Frost, Bathory, Venom, and Sodom but also with its own elements.

Melechesh was formed in Jerusalem in 1993, "the first overtly anti-Christian band to exist in one of the holiest cities in the world". Melechesh began as a straightforward black metal act with their first foray into folk metal occurring on their 1996 EP The Siege of Lachish. Their subsequent albums straddled black, death, and thrash metal. Another band, Arallu, was formed in the late 1990s and has relationships with Melechesh and Salem. Melechesh and Arallu perform a style they call "Mesopotamian Black Metal", a blend of black metal and Mesopotamian folk music.

Since the 2000s, a number of anti-Islamic and anti-religious black metal bands—whose members come from Muslim backgrounds—have emerged in the Middle East. Janaza, believed to be Iraq's first female black metal artist, released the demo Burning Quran Ceremony in 2010. Its frontwoman, Anahita, claimed her parents and brother were killed by a suicide bomb during the Iraq War. Another Iraqi band, Seeds of Iblis, also fronted by Anahita, released their debut EP Jihad Against Islam in 2011 through French label Legion of Death. Metal news website Metalluminati suggests that their claims of being based in Iraq are a hoax. These bands, along with Tadnees (from Saudi Arabia), Halla (from Iran), False Allah (from Bahrain), and Mosque of Satan (from Lebanon), style themselves as the "Arabic Anti-Islamic Legion". Another Lebanese band, Ayat, drew much attention with their debut album Six Years of Dormant Hatred, released through North American label Moribund Records in 2008. Some European bands have also begun expressing anti-Islamic views, most notably the Norwegian band Taake.

== Styles and subgenres ==
Regarding the sound of black metal, there are two conflicting groups within the genre: "those that stay true to the genre's roots, and those that introduce progressive elements". The former believe that the music should always be minimalist—performed only with the standard guitar-bass-drums setup and recorded in a low fidelity style. One supporter of this train of thought is Blake Judd of Nachtmystium, who has rejected labeling his band black metal for its departure from the genre's typical sound. Snorre Ruch of Thorns, on the other hand, has said that modern black metal is "too narrow" and believes that this was "not the idea at the beginning".

Since the 1990s, different styles of black metal have emerged and some have melded Norwegian-style black metal with other genres:

=== Ambient black metal ===
Ambient black metal, also known as atmospheric black metal, is a style of black metal that relies on heavy incorporation of atmospheric, sometimes dreamy textures, and is therefore less aggressive. It often features synthesizers or classical instrumentation, typically for melody or ethereal "shimmering" over the wall of sound provided by the guitars. The music is usually slow to mid paced with rare blast beat usage, without any abrupt changes and generally features slowly developing, sometimes repetitive melodies and riffs, which separate it from other black metal styles. Subject matter usually concerns nature, folklore, mythology, and personal introspection. Artists include Summoning, Agalloch, Urfaust, and Wolves in the Throne Room.

=== Black-doom ===
Black-doom, also known as blackened doom, is a style that combines the slowness and thicker, bassier sound of doom metal with the shrieking vocals and heavily distorted guitar sound of black metal. Black-doom bands maintain the Satanic ideology associated with black metal, while melding it with moodier themes more related to doom metal, like depression, nihilism and nature. They also use the slower pace of doom metal in order to emphasize the harsh atmosphere present in black metal. Examples of black-doom bands include Barathrum, Forgotten Tomb, Woods of Ypres, Deinonychus, Shining, Nortt, Bethlehem, early Katatonia, Tiamat, Dolorian, and October Tide.

==== Depressive suicidal black metal ====
Pioneered by black-doom bands like Ophthalamia, Katatonia, Bethlehem, Forgotten Tomb and Shining, depressive suicidal black metal, also known as suicidal black metal, depressive black metal or DSBM, is a style that melds the second wave-style of black metal with doom metal, with lyrics revolving around themes such as depression, self-harm, misanthropy, suicide and death. DSBM bands draw on the lo-fi recording and highly distorted guitars of black metal, while employing the usage of acoustic instruments and non-distorted electric guitar timbres present in doom metal, interchanging the slower, doom-like, sections with faster tremolo picking. Vocals are usually high-pitched like in black metal, but lacking energy, simulating feelings like hopelessness, desperation, and entreaty. The presence of one-man bands is more prominent in this genre compared to others. Examples of bands include Xasthur, Leviathan, Strid, Silencer, Make a Change... Kill Yourself, Lifelover and I Shalt Become.

=== Black 'n' roll ===
Black 'n' roll is a style of black metal that incorporates elements from 1970s hard rock and rock and roll music. Examples of black 'n' roll bands include Carpathian Forest, Kvelertak, Vreid, and Khold. Bands such as Satyricon, Nachtmystium, Nidingr, Craft, and Sarke also experimented with the genre.

=== Blackened crust ===
Crust punk groups such as Antisect, Sacrilege and Anti System took some influence from early black metal bands like Venom, Hellhammer, and Celtic Frost, while Amebix's lead vocalist and guitarist sent his band's early demo tape to Cronos of Venom, who replied by saying "We'll rip you off." Similarly, Bathory was initially inspired by crust punk as well as heavy metal. Crust punk was affected by a second wave of black metal in the 1990s, with some bands emphasizing these black metal elements. Iskra are probably the most obvious example of second-wave black metal-influenced crust punk; Iskra coined their own phrase "blackened crust" to describe their new style. The Japanese group Gallhammer also fused crust punk with black metal while the English band Fukpig has been said to have elements of crust punk, black metal, and grindcore. North Carolina's Young and in the Way have been playing blackened crust since their formation in 2009. In addition, Norwegian band Darkthrone have incorporated crust punk traits in their more recent material. As Daniel Ekeroth wrote in 2008,

In a very ironic paradox, black metal and crust punk have recently started to embrace one another. Members of Darkthrone and Satyricon have lately claimed that they love punk, while among crusties, black metal is the latest fashion. In fact, the latest album by crust punk band Skitsystem sounds very black metal—while the latest black metal opus by Darkthrone sounds very punk! This would have been unimaginable in the early 90s.

=== Blackened death-doom ===
Blackened death-doom is a genre that combines the slow tempos and monolithic drumming of doom metal, the complex and loud riffage of death metal and the shrieking vocals of black metal. Examples of blackened death-doom bands include Morast, Faustcoven, The Ruins of Beverast, Bölzer, Necros Christos, Harvest Gulgaltha, Dragged into Sunlight, Hands of Thieves, and Soulburn. Kim Kelly, journalist from Vice, has called Faustcoven as "one of the finest bands to ever successfully meld black, death, and doom metal into a cohesive, legible whole."

=== Blackened death metal ===
Blackened death metal is commonly death metal that incorporates musical, lyrical or ideological elements of black metal, such as an increased use of tremolo picking, anti-Christian or Satanic lyrical themes and chord progressions similar to those used in black metal. Blackened death metal bands are also more likely to wear corpse paint and suits of armour, than bands from other styles of death metal. Lower range guitar tunings, death growls and abrupt tempo changes are common in the genre. Examples of blackened death metal bands are Belphegor, Behemoth, Akercocke, and Sacramentum.

==== Melodic black-death ====
Melodic black-death (also known as blackened melodic death metal or melodic blackened death metal) is a genre of extreme metal that describes the style created when melodic death metal bands began being inspired by black metal and European romanticism. However, unlike most other black metal, this take on the genre incorporated an increased sense of melody and narrative. Some bands who have played this style include Dissection, Sacramentum, Naglfar, God Dethroned, Dawn, Unanimated, Thulcandra, Skeletonwitch and Cardinal Sin.

==== War metal ====
War metal (also known as war black metal or bestial black metal) is an aggressive, cacophonous, and chaotic subgenre of blackened death metal, described by Rock Hard journalist Wolf-Rüdiger Mühlmann as "rabid" and "hammering". Important influences include early black and death metal bands, such as Sodom, Possessed, Autopsy, Sarcófago, and the first two Sepultura releases, as well as seminal grindcore acts like Repulsion. War metal bands include Blasphemy, Archgoat, Impiety, and Bestial Warlust.

=== Blackened grindcore ===
Blackened grindcore is a fusion genre that combines elements of black metal and grindcore. Notable bands include Anaal Nathrakh and early Rotting Christ.

=== Blackened thrash metal ===
Blackened thrash metal, also known as black-thrash, is a fusion genre that combines elements of black metal and thrash metal. Being considered one of the first fusions of extreme metal, it was inspired by bands such as Venom, Sodom, and Sarcófago. Notable bands include Aura Noir, Witchery, Black Fast, Sathanas, and Deströyer 666.

=== Folk black metal, pagan metal, and Viking metal ===
Folk black metal, pagan metal and Viking metal are styles that incorporates elements of folk music, with pagan metal bands focusing on pagan lyrics and imagery, and Viking metal bands giving thematic focus on Norse mythology, Norse paganism, and the Viking Age, more influenced by Nordic folk music. While not focused on Satanism, the bands' use of ancient folklore and mythologies still express anti-Christian views, with folk black metal doing it as part of a "rebellion to the status quo", that developed concurrently along with the rise of folk metal in Europe in the 1990s, Notable artist include Negură Bunget, Windir, Primordial, In the Woods..., Cruachan, and Bathory, to whose albums Blood Fire Death (1988) and Hammerheart (1990) the origin of Viking metal can be traced.

=== Industrial black metal ===
Industrial black metal is a style of black metal that incorporates elements of industrial music. Mysticum, formed in 1991, was the first of these groups. DHG (Dødheimsgard), Thorns from Norway and Blut Aus Nord, N.K.V.D. and Blacklodge from France, have been acclaimed for their incorporation of industrial elements. Other industrial black metal musicians include Samael, The Axis of Perdition, Aborym, and ...And Oceans. In addition, The Kovenant, Mortiis and Ulver emerged from the Norwegian black metal scene, but later chose to experiment with industrial music.

=== Post-black metal ===
Post-black metal is an umbrella term for genres that experiment beyond black metal's conventions and broaden their sounds, evolving past the genre's limits. Notable bands include Myrkur, Alcest, Bosse-de-Nage, and Wildernessking.

==== Blackgaze ====
Blackgaze incorporates common black metal and post-black metal elements such as blast beat drumming and high-pitched screamed vocals with the melodic and heavily distorted guitar styles typically associated with shoegazing. It is associated with bands such as Deafheaven, Alcest, Vaura, Amesoeurs, Bosse-de-Nage, Oathbreaker, and Fen.

=== Psychedelic black metal ===
Psychedelic black metal is a subgenre of black metal which employs the usage of psychedelic elements. Notable acts include Oranssi Pazuzu, Nachtmystium, Deafheaven, Woe, Amesoeurs, and In the Woods....

=== Raw black metal ===
Raw black metal is a subgenre that seeks to amplify the primitive qualities of the second wave of black metal, by giving priority to its lo-fi production values. To achieve this, bands under this style usually emphasize the usage of higher-pitches in their guitar sound and vocals, while employing techniques such as tremolo picking and blast beats more often. Its imagery is often associated with dystopic and minimalistic tendencies. The style was pioneered by Ildjarn, with other notable bands including Gorgoroth and Darkthrone.

=== Symphonic black metal ===
Symphonic black metal is a style of black metal that incorporates symphonic and orchestral elements. This may include the usage of instruments found in symphony orchestras (piano, violin, cello, flute and keyboards), "clean" or operatic vocals and guitars with less distortion. Notable bands include Emperor, Troll, Dimmu Borgir and Bal-Sagoth.

== Ideology ==
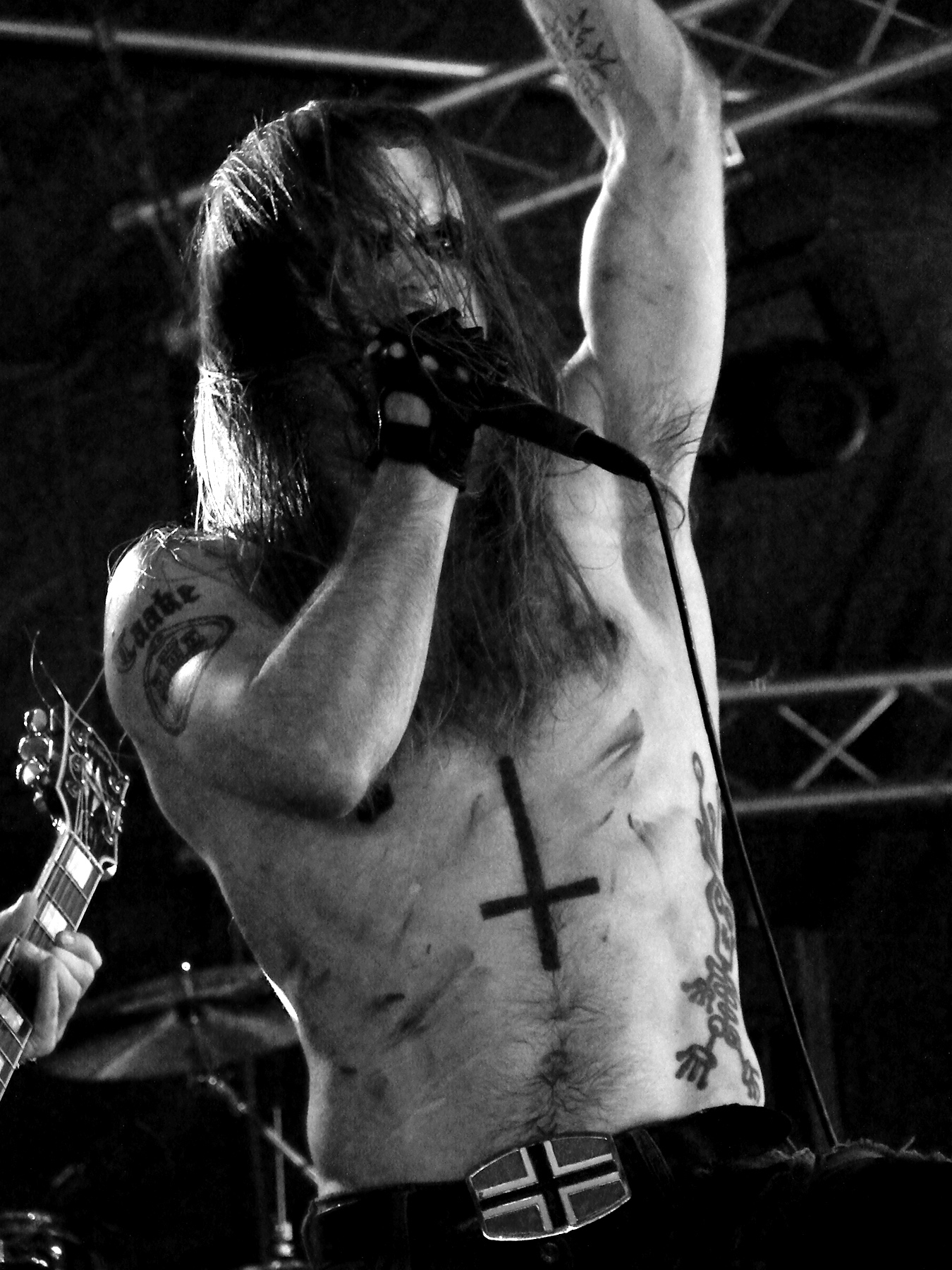
The inverted Christian cross is a common symbol associated with black metal imagery, usually used to signify opposition to Christianity.

Unlike other metal genres, black metal is associated with a worldview and ethos. It is fiercely opposed to Christianity and the other main institutional religions, Islam and Judaism. Many black metal bands are Satanists and see Satanism as a key part of black metal. Others advocate ethnic Paganism, "often coupled with nationalism", although the early Pagan bands did not call themselves 'black metal'.

Black metal tends to be misanthropic and hostile to modern society. It is "a reaction against the mundanity, insincerity and emotional emptiness that participants feel is intrinsic to modern secular culture". Aaron Weaver from Wolves in the Throne Room said: "I think that black metal is an artistic movement that is critiquing modernity on a fundamental level, saying that the modern world view is missing something". As part of this, black metal tends to glorify nature and have a fascination with the distant past. There is a tradition of environmentalism within black metal. The genre has been likened to Romanticism and there is an undercurrent of romantic nationalism in black metal. Sam Dunn noted that "unlike any other heavy metal scene, the culture and the place is incorporated into the music and imagery". Individualism is also an important part of black metal, with Fenriz of Darkthrone describing black metal as "individualism above all". Unlike other kinds of metal, black metal has numerous one-man bands. However, it is argued that followers of Euronymous were anti-individualistic, and that "Black Metal is characterized by a conflict between radical individualism and group identity and by an attempt to accept both polarities simultaneously". The black metal scene tends to oppose political correctness, consumerism, globalization and homogeneity.

In his master's thesis, Benjamin Hedge Olson wrote that some artists can be seen as transcendentalists. Dissatisfied with a "world that they feel is devoid of spiritual and cultural significance", they try to leave or "transcend" their "mundane physical forms" and become one with the divine. This is done through their concerts, which he describes as "musical rituals" that involve self-mortification and taking on an alternative, "spiritual persona" (for example, by the wearing of costume and face paint).

Generally, black metal strives to remain an underground phenomenon.

=== Satanism ===
The inverted pentagram is commonly used by bands in the genre

Black metal was originally a term for extreme metal bands with Satanic lyrics and imagery. However, most of the 'first wave' bands (including Venom, who coined the term 'black metal') were not Satanists; rather, they used Satanic themes to provoke controversy. One of the few exceptions was Mercyful Fate singer and Church of Satan member King Diamond, whom Michael Moynihan calls "one of the only performers of the '80s Satanic metal who was more than just a poseur using a devilish image for shock value".

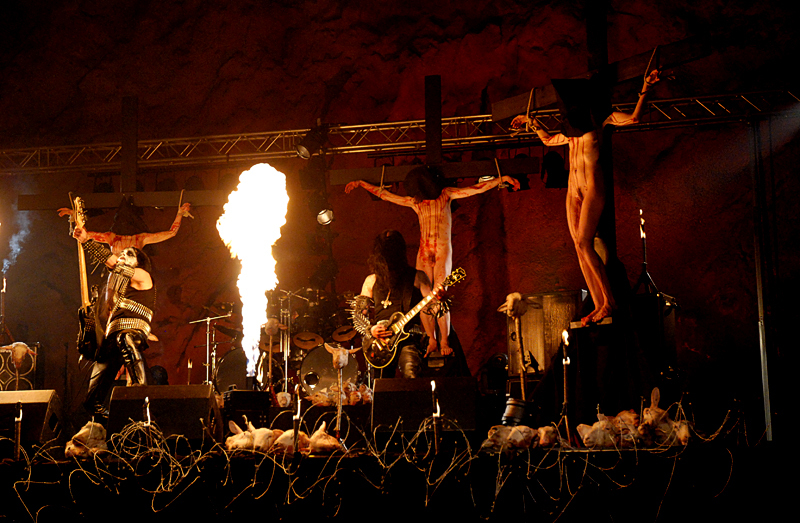
Video shoot for "Carving a Giant" by Gorgoroth, which features mock crucifixions

In the early 1990s, many Norwegian black-metallers presented themselves as genuine Devil worshippers. Mayhem's Euronymous was the key figure behind this. They attacked the Church of Satan for its "freedom and life-loving" views; the theistic Satanism they espoused was an inversion of Christianity. Benjamin Hedge Olson wrote that they transformed "Venom's quasi-Satanic stage theatrics into a form of cultural expression unique from other forms of metal or Satanism" and "abandoned the mundane identities and ambitions of other forms of metal in favor of religious and ideological fanaticism". Some prominent scene members—such as Euronymous and Faust—said that only bands who are Satanists can be called "black metal". Bands with a Norwegian style, but without Satanic lyrics, tended to use other names for their music. Some prominent artists still hold the view that black metal should be Satanic, while others believe that black metal does not need to be Satanic. An article in Metalion's Slayer fanzine attacked musicians that "care more about their guitars than the actual essence onto which the whole concept was and is based upon". Bands with a similar style but with Pagan lyrics tend to be referred to as 'Pagan Metal' by many 'purist' black-metallers.

Others shun Satanism, seeing it as Christian or "Judeo-Christian" in origin, and regard Satanists as perpetuating the "Judeo-Christian" worldview. Quorthon of Bathory said he originally used 'Satan' to provoke and attack Christianity. However, with his third and fourth albums he began "attacking Christianity from a different angle", realizing that Satanism is a "Christian product". Nevertheless, some artists use Satan as a symbol or metaphor for their beliefs, such as LaVeyan Satanists, who are atheist. Vocalist Gaahl, who follows Norse paganism, said while he was a member of Gorgoroth: "We use the word 'Satanist' because it is Christian world and we have to speak their language ... When I use the word 'Satan', it means the natural order, the will of a man, the will to grow, the will to become the superman". Varg Vikernes called himself a Satanist in early interviews but "now downplays his former interest in Satanism", saying he was using Satan as a symbol for Odin as the 'adversary' of the Christian God. He saw Satanism as "an introduction to more indigenous heathen beliefs".

=== Christianity ===
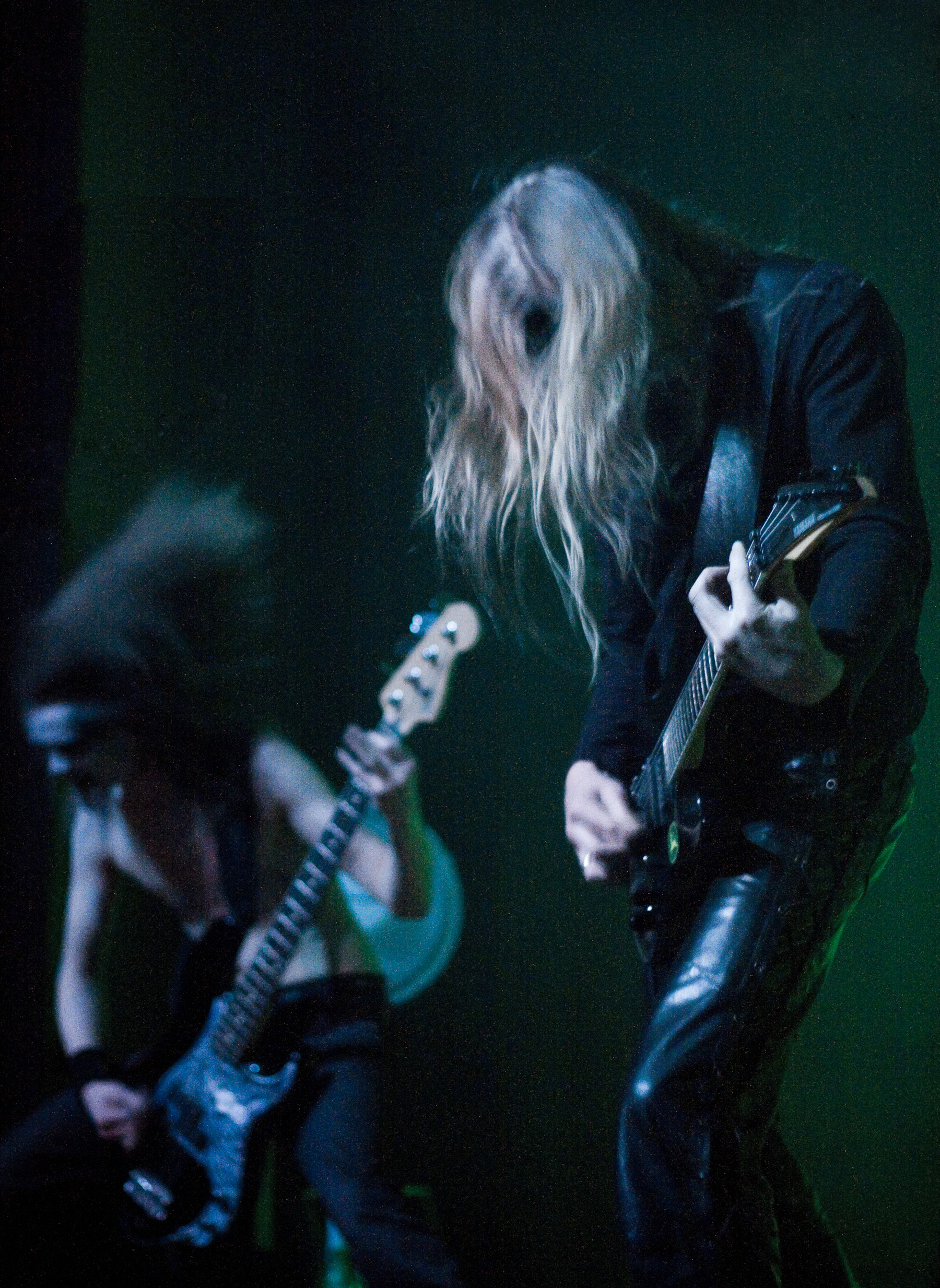
The Norwegian unblack metal band Antestor.

'Unblack metal' refers to a small group of bands who invert black metal's typical lyrics and promote Christianity. The first 'unblack metal' record, Hellig Usvart (1994) by Australian artist Horde, was a provocative parody of Norwegian black metal. It sparked controversy, and death threats were issued against Horde. Norwegian Christian metal band Crush Evil adopted a black metal style in the late 1990s and were renamed Antestor.

Many black-metallers see "Christian black metal" as an oxymoron and believe black metal cannot be Christian. In fact, the early unblack metal groups Horde and Antestor refused to call their music "black metal" because they did not share its ethos. Horde called its music "holy unblack metal" and Antestor called theirs "sorrow metal". Horde's Jayson Sherlock later said "I will never understand why Christians think they can play Black Metal. I really don't think they understand what true Black Metal is". However, current unblack metal bands such as Crimson Moonlight feel that black metal has changed from an ideological movement to a purely musical genre, and thus call their music 'black metal'.

=== Politics ===
A wide range of political views are found in the black metal scene. Black metal is generally not political music and the vast majority of bands do not express political views. The genre is seen more as "fantastical escapism", and artists usually see themselves as merely depicting the "macabre nature of the world". Ihsahn of Emperor explained:

"I see it much more as an atmospheric and emotional thing rather than a political one. Hardcore bands can deal with political things; black metal is something else".

However, some black metal artists promote political ideologies. National Socialist black metal (NSBM) promotes neo-Nazi or far-right politics through its lyrics and imagery. Like Nazi punk, it is "distinguished only by ideology, not musical character". Artists typically meld neo-Nazism with ethnic European paganism; however, a few meld these beliefs with Satanism or occultism. Some commentators see it as a natural development of the "black metal worldview". Some members of the early Norwegian scene flirted with Nazi imagery, but this was largely for shock value and to provoke. Varg Vikernes—who now refers to his ideology as 'Odalism'—is credited with introducing such views into the scene. Some bands support fascist Satanist groups like the Order of Nine Angles.

NSBM artists are a small minority within the genre. While many black metal fans boycott Neo-Nazi artists, others are indifferent or appreciate the music without supporting the musicians. NSBM has been criticized by many prominent and influential black metal artists. Some liken Nazism to Christianity by arguing that both are authoritarian, collectivist, and a "herd mentality". Olson writes that the shunning of Nazism by some black-metallers "has nothing to do with notions of a 'universal humanity' or a rejection of hate" but that Nazism is shunned "because its hatred is too specific and exclusive".

Partly in reaction to NSBM, a small number of artists began promoting left-wing politics such as anarchism or Marxism, creating a movement known as "Red and anarchist black metal" (RABM). Many artists have a background in anarchist crust punk. Artists labelled RABM include Iskra, Panopticon, Skagos, Underdark, Storm of Sedition, Not A Cost, and Black Kronstadt. Some others with similar outlook, such as Wolves in the Throne Room, are not overtly political and do not endorse the label.

== Media ==
=== Documentaries on black metal ===
- 666 – At Calling Death (1993) was a documentary released by Nuclear Blast, which provides an abundance of interviews and perspectives on the meaning of both death and black metal genres from musicians who perform these styles, in light of the Norwegian scene church burnings and murders, which had been occurring around that time. The latter half of the documentary focuses on black metal.
- Parabellum – The Devil was born in Medellín [English Subtitles] https://www.youtube.com/watch?v=kUgTN7bfPqk (2016)
- svarte alvor (1994)
- Satan Rides the Media (1998)
- Black Metal (1998), a Belgian documentary by Marilyn Watelet.
- Norsk Black Metal (2003) was aired on Norwegian TV by the Norwegian Broadcasting Corporation (NRK).
- Metal: A Headbanger's Journey (2005) touches on black metal in the early 1990s, and includes an extensive 25-minute feature on the DVD release.
- True Norwegian Black Metal (2007) is a five-part feature from VICE. It explores some of the aspects of the lifestyle, beliefs and controversies surrounding former Gorgoroth vocalist Gaahl.
- Black Metal: A Documentary (2007), produced by Bill Zebub, explores the world of black metal from the point of view of the artists. There is no narrator and no one outside of black metal takes part in any interview or storytelling.
- Pure Fucking Mayhem (2009) tells the story of the black metal band Mayhem and the tragedies surrounding them.
- Murder Music: A History of Black Metal (2007)
- The Misanthrope (2007) written and directed by Ted "Nocturno Culto" Skjellum from extreme metal duo Darkthrone.
- Once Upon a Time in Norway (2008)
- Black Metal Satanica (2008)
- Until the Light Takes Us (2009) explores black metal's origins and subculture, featuring exclusive interviews and including rare footage from the Black Circle's early days.
- Loputon Gehennan Liekki (Eternal Flame of Gehenna)(2011) Finnish black metal documentary
- Out of the Black – A Black Metal Documentary (2012), an examination of the musical and social origins of black metal while exploring the full spectrum of the religious ideology within the scene. Also examines black metal in America and the multiple differences between the American and the Scandinavian scene.
- One Man Metal (2012) explores the lifestyle and thoughts of the members of the three one-man bands Xasthur, Leviathan and Striborg.
- Attention! Black Metal (2012)
- Helvete: Historien om norsk black metal (2020). The history of Norwegian black metal from the early eighties through musical innovation, image building, murder, suicide and church burnings, and international recognition. With more focus on the history of the music and people involved, rather than just the scandals.

=== References in media ===
- A black metal mockumentary Legalize Murder was released in 2006.
- Parabellum – The Devil was born in Medellín [English Subtitles] Parabellum – El Diablo Nació En Medellín [English Subtitles] (2016)
- The cartoon show Metalocalypse is about an extreme metal band called Dethklok, with many references to leading black metal artists on the names of various businesses, such as Fintroll's convenience store, Dimmu Burger, Gorgoroth's electric wheelchair store, Carpathian Forest High School, Marduk's Putt & Stuff, Burzum's hot-dogs and Behemoth studios (the man who owns Behemoth studios is also named Mr. Grishnackh). In the episode "Dethdad", Dethklok travels to Norway to both visit Toki's dying father and the original black metal record store, much to the dismay of the band members when they find out the store does not sell any of their music, described by the owner as being "too digital".
- A Norwegian commercial for a laundry detergent once depicted black metal musicians as part of the advertisement.
- Black metal bands such as 1349, Emperor, Behemoth, Dimmu Borgir, Enslaved and Satyricon have had their videos make appearances on MTV's Headbangers Ball.
- Comedian Brian Posehn made a visual reference to Norwegian black metal bands in the music video for his comedy song "Metal by Numbers".
- A KFC commercial screened in Canada (2008) and Australia (2010) featuring a fictional black metal band called Hellvetica. Onstage, the band's singer does a fire-eating trick. Once backstage, he takes a bite of the spicy KFC chicken and declares, "Oh man, that is hot".
- The twenty-first episode of the fourth season of Bones, "Mayhem on a Cross", featured the discovery of a human skeleton at a black metal concert in Norway.
- There are many references to black/extreme metal bands (Bathory, Marduk, Cradle of Filth and Dimmu Borgir) in Åke Edwardson's 1999 crime novel Sun and Shadow (Sol och skugga). The plot involves the music of a fictional Canadian black metal band called Sacrament. As part of the inquiry, Inspector Winter tries to distinguish between black and death metal artists.
- In the UK show The Inbetweeners during some scenes in the sixth form common room, a Mayhem poster for the album Ordo ad Chao can be seen.
- A recurring theme in The IT Crowd (seasons 1 and 2) is the conversion of a character (Richmond) from executive to pariah through his exposure to Cradle of Filth.
- A black metal act is used to advertise "ZYX Sitruuna", a Finnish remedy for throat pain.
- Jonas Åkerlund's 2018 horror-thriller film, Lords of Chaos, based on the 1998 non-fiction book of the same name, centres around a series of crimes that occurred in Oslo, Norway in the early 1990s surrounding the black metal bands Mayhem and Burzum.

== See also ==
- List of black metal bands
- Shrieking
