= Death Comes in 26 Carefully Selected Pieces =

Death Comes In 26 Carefully Selected Pieces

Live album by Impaled Nazarene
- Released: 2005
- Recorded: live on 19 December 2004 at Tavastia Club in Helsinki, Finland
- Genre: Black metal
- Length: 68:07
- Label: Osmose Productions
- Producer: Impaled Nazarene

Impaled Nazarene chronology
All That You Fear (2003)	Death Comes In 26 Carefully Selected Pieces (2005)	Pro Patria Finlandia (2006)

Professional ratings
Review scores
Source	Rating
Allmusic	4.5/5 stars

Death Comes in 26 Carefully Selected Pieces is the tenth album by the Finnish black metal band Impaled Nazarene. It was recorded live at the Tavastia Club in Helsinki on 19 December 2004 and released in 2005.

== Track listing ==
- All Lyrics By Mika Luttinen. Music As Noted. Copyright Les Editions Hurlantes.
1. "Intro" (M. Makinen) 2:57
2. "The Horny and the Horned" (Kimmo Luttinen) 3:30
3. "Armageddon Death Squad" (Mikael Arnkil) 2:54
4. "Goat Perversion" (K. Luttinen) 1:17
5. "1999:Karmageddon Warriors" (Taneli Jarva) 2:40
6. "Motörpenis" (Jarva) 2:05
7. "Kohta ei naura enää Jeesuskaan" (M. Luttinen) 2:09
8. "The Endless War" (Arnkil) 3:57
9. "Sadhu Satana" (K. Luttinen) 2:59
10. "Ghettoblaster" (K. Luttinen) 2:10
11. "Coraxo" (K. Luttinen) 0:15
12. "Soul Rape" (K. Luttinen) 1:52
13. "Sadistic 666/Under a Golden Shower" (K. Luttinen) 4:24
14. "Zero Tolerance" (Alexi Laiho) 1:38
15. "The Maggot Crusher" (Reima Kellokoski) 3:27
16. "Let's Fucking Die" (Laiho, K. Luttinen) 2:26
17. "Tribulation Hell" (Arnkil) 3:11
18. "We're Satan's Generation" (M. Luttinen) 2:11
19. "Cogito Ergo Sum" (Laiho) 2:13
20. "Goat Seeds of Doom" (Arnkil) 3:20
21. "Condemned to Hell" (K. Luttinen) 3:53
22. "Intro SFP" (K. Luttinen) 0:53
23. "Sadogoat" (K. Luttinen) 2:49
24. "Vitutuksen Multihuipennus" (K. Luttinen) 2:01
25. "The Lost Art of Goat Sacrificing" (Kellokoski) 3:34
26. "Total War-Winter War" (K. Luttinen) 3:10

== Personnel ==
- Mika Luttinen: Vocals
- Tuomio: Lead Guitar
- Onraj 9MM: Rhythm Guitar
- Arc V 666: Bass
- Repe Misanthrope: Drums

== Production ==
- Produced by Impaled Nazarene
- Recorded, Engineered & Mixed by Tapio Pennanen
- Digital Editing & Mastering By Mika Jussila

== Sources ==
- CD- Death Comes in 26 Carefully Selected Pieces
