= Mika Luttinen =

Finnish singer (born 1971)

Mika Kristian Luttinen
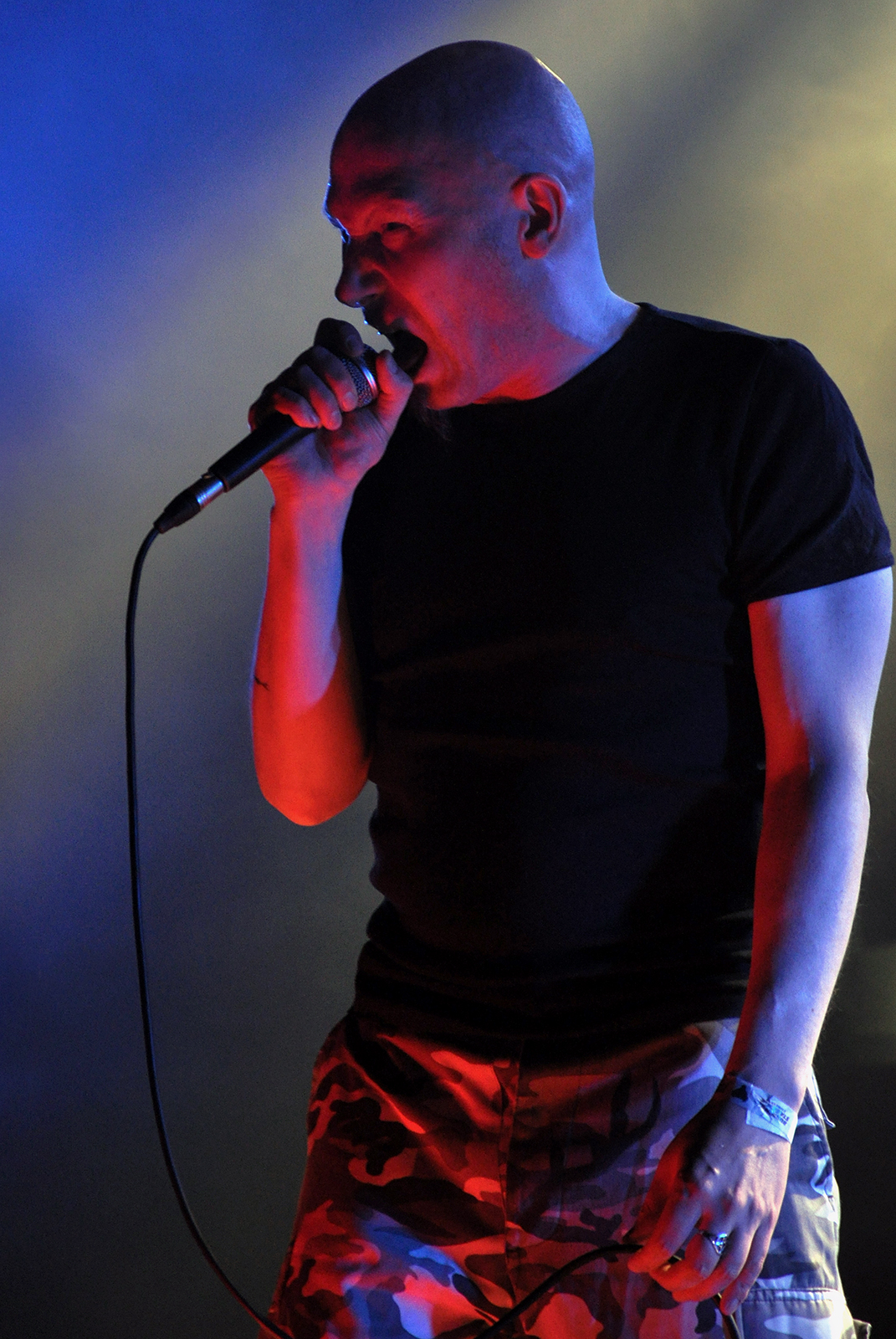
- Luttinen at the Kings of Black Metal in Alsfeld in Germany, 2012

Background information
- Also known as: Sluti666, Mr.M.L., Mika X6X, Mika Vitun Luttinen, Mika X6X Alienseed, Mikaakim, Frank Slut
- Born: 2 March 1971 (age 54); Oulu, Finland
- Genres: Black metal, death metal, grindcore, crust punk, industrial, darkwave, folk metal, Viking metal
- Occupations: Singer, songwriter
- Years active: 1990–present
- Labels: Osmose Productions

Mika Kristian Luttinen is a Finnish vocalist who formed the black metal band Impaled Nazarene in 1990. After numerous line-up changes, he remains the only original member. Besides his main project, Mika has been involved in various other bands around the globe, such as the Canadian metal band Obscene Eulogy and the French black punk band, The Rocking Dildos which was formed by owner of the French label Osmose Productions, Hervé and himself. While in Impaled Nazarene, he was also involved with the band, Diabolos Rising (name later changed to Raism), together with then Rotting Christ keyboard player, Magus Wampyr Daoloth. Luttinen has made notable guest appearances in many bands, such as The Crown, Hypnos, Ancient Rites (Ancient Rites singer Gunther Theys was also Mika's best man at the latter's wedding. Mika has stated that his songwriting is influenced by many early thrash metal bands, such as Sodom and Kreator. Elements of Motörhead's music are also incorporated into his work, such that an Impaled Nazarene single was named Motörpenis.

== Discography ==
Impaled Nazarene

- Tol Cormpt Norz Norz Norz... (1992)
- Ugra-Karma (1993)
- Suomi Finland Perkele (1994)
- Latex Cult (1996)
- Rapture (1998)
- Nihil (2000)
- Absence of War Does Not Mean Peace (2001)
- All That You Fear (2003)
- Pro Patria Finlandia (2006)
- Manifest (2007)
- Road to the Octagon (2010)
- Vigorous and Liberating Death (2014)

Diabolos Rising

- 666 (1994)
- Blood, Vampirism & Sadism (1995)

Obscene Eulogy

- Defining Hate: The Truth Undead (2004)

Raism

- The Very Best of Pain (1996)
- Aesthetic Terrorism (1997)

The Rocking Dildos

- On Speed (1997)
- Horny Hit Parade (1997)
