= Eight Headed Serpent =

Studio album by Impaled Nazarene
- Released: 28 May 2021
- Recorded: July–August 2020
- Studio: Revolver Studio
- Genre: Black metal
- Length: 32:21
- Label: Osmose
- Producer: Impaled Nazarene

Impaled Nazarene chronology
Vigorous and Liberating Death (2014)	Eight Headed Serpent (2021)

Eight Headed Serpent is the thirteenth full-length studio album from Finnish black metal band Impaled Nazarene. It was released, as are all of their albums thus far, on Osmose Productions on 28 May 2021. The album is available on CD, LP, cassette and digital download.

== Title and lyrical themes ==
The album's working title was The Octagon Order but was eventually changed to Eight Headed Serpent – originating from Japanese mythology Yamata no Orochi, despite it not being a theme album. In the same interview Luttinen also said that lyrics handle themes like cancel culture, virtue signalling, flatearthers, anti-vaxxers and alternative medicine, among others.

== Composition and recording ==
After a few years of gigs following the previous album Vigorous and Liberating Death, the band began considering of recording a new album. As has been the tradition with prior albums, the band members brought already-composed songs to the studio with oldest of them written a few years prior. For this album the band selected a recording studio new to them – Revolver Studio – led by Asko Ahonen who had never heard of the band before and had mostly recorded Finnish pop and schlager music. The recording spanned from early July to the end of August 2020. The album was mixed in mid-October also by Ahonen, quickly followed by mastering made by Mika Jussila at Finnvox Studio.

== Release ==
Prepending the release of the actual album, an EP named after the opening track Goat of Mendes was released on 9 April 2021. The EP had also a re-recorded version of Ugra-Karma song The Horny and the Horned and was released both digitally and on a 7" vinyl.

The actual album was then released on 28 May 2021.

== Track listing ==
- All songs written by Impaled Nazarene.
1. "Goat of Mendes" 3:14
2. "Eight Headed Serpent" 2:23
3. "Shock and Awe" 2:42
4. "The Nonconformists" 2:39
5. "Octagon Order" 1:49
6. "Metastasizing and Changing Threat" 2:23
7. "Debauchery and Decay" 3:08
8. "Human Cesspool" 0:58
9. "Apocalypse Pervertor" 1:46
10. "Triumphant Return of the Antichrist" 1:59
11. "Unholy Necromancy" 2:30
12. "Mutilation of the Nazarene Whore" 1:51
13. "Foucault Pendulum" 4:59
14. "Penis et Circes (2021)" 2:14 (digipak bonus track)
15. "The Horny and the Horned (2021)" 3:10 (digipak bonus track)

== Personnel ==
- Mika "Sluti666" Luttinen – vocals
- Tomi "UG" Ullgren – lead and rhythm guitars
- Mikael "Arc v 666" Arnkil – bass
- Reima "Repe Misanthrope" Kellokoski – drums

== Production ==
- Arranged and produced by Impaled Nazarene
- Recorded and mixed by Asko Ahonen at Revolver Studio, 2020
- Mastered by Mika Jussila at Finnvox Studios, 2020

== Miscellaneous staff ==
- Artwork by Tuomas "Ritual" Tahvanainen

== Charts ==
Chart (2021)	Peak position
Finnish Albums (Suomen virallinen lista)	40
