= Latex Cult =

Studio album by Impaled Nazarene
- Released: 1996
- Genre: Black metal
- Length: 30:48
- Label: Osmose Productions
- Producer: Jarmo Anttila, Mika Luttinen

Impaled Nazarene chronology
Suomi Finland Perkele (1994)	Latex Cult (1996)	Rapture (1998)

Latex Cult is the fourth full-length album by Finnish black metal band Impaled Nazarene. A music video was made for "1999: Karmakeddon Warriors".

The album was rated a nine out of ten by Chronicles of Chaos.

== Track listing ==
- All music and lyrics by Impaled Nazarene, except where noted.
1. "66.6 s of Foreplay" 1:06
2. "1999: Karmakeddon Warriors" 2:38
3. "Violence I Crave" 1:37
4. "Bashing in Heads" 1:10
5. "Motörpenis" 2:21
6. "Zum Kotzen" (Music: Impaled Nazarene; Lyrics: Potka) 3:14
7. "Alien Militant" 2:46
8. "Goat War" 0:52
9. "Punishment Is Absolute" 2:47
10. "When All Golden Turned to Shit" 1:26
11. "Masterbator" 2:25
12. "Burning of Provinciestraat" 3:12
13. "I Eat Pussy for Breakfast" 1:25
14. "Delirium Tremens" 3:21

== Personnel ==
- Mika Luttinen – vocals
- Jarno Anttila – guitar
- Taneli Jarva – bass
- Reima Kellokoski – drums

=== Production ===
- Executive Producer – Osmose Productions
- Produced by Mika Luttinen and Jarno Anttila
- Engineers – Ahti Kortelainen
