= Of Lucifer and Lightning =

Of Lucifer And Lightning

Studio album by Angelcorpse
- Released: April 30, 2007
- Recorded: November 2006–January 2007
- Studio: Audio Lab, Max Trax
- Genre: Blackened death metal
- Length: 36:26
- Label: Osmose Productions

Professional ratings
Review scores
Source	Rating
Allmusic	3.5/5 stars

Of Lucifer And Lightning is the fourth and final full-length album from blackened death metal band Angelcorpse. It was released in 2007 on Osmose Productions.

== Track listing ==
- All songs written By Helmkamp/Palubicki.
1. "Credo Decimatus" — 1:28
2. "Antichrist Vanguard" — 3:28
3. "Machinery of the Cleansing" — 3:30
4. "Hexensabbat" — 4:44
5. "Extermination Sworn" — 3:51
6. "Saints of Blasphemy" — 6:04
7. "Thrall" — 4:20
8. "Shining One (Rex Luciferi)" — 5:09
9. "Lustmord" — 3:52

== Personnel ==
- Pete Helmkamp – bass, vocals
- Gene Palubicki – lead and rhythm guitars
- John Longstreth – drums

== Production ==
- Engineers: Greg Marchak, Brett Portzer
