= Nuctemeron Descent =

Studio album by Abominator
- Released: December 1, 2003
- Genre: Blackened death metal
- Length: 45:39
- Label: Osmose Productions

Abominator chronology
Subversives for Lucifer (2001)	Nuctemeron Descent (2003)	The Eternal Conflagration (2006)

Professional ratings
Review scores
Source	Rating
Scream Magazine	5/6 stars

Nuctemeron Descent is the third full length studio album by the blackened death metal band Abominator. It was released on Osmose Productions in 2003.

== Track listing ==
1. "Dimensions of Mammon Enshroud" - 5:01
2. "Cascading Carnage" - 5:47
3. "Necrosexual Thrust" - 5:17
4. "Intoxicated with Satanic Hate" - 6:06
5. "Black Flames of Expulsion" - 3:58
6. "Scourge Immortalised" - 5:39
7. "Nuctemeron Descent" - 4:43
8. "Hymn to Baphomet" - 2:23
9. "The Ultimate Ordinance of Obliteration" - 6:45
