= Suomi Finland Perkele =

Studio album by Impaled Nazarene
- Released: 16 October 1994
- Recorded: July 1994 at Tico Tico studios in Kemi, Finland
- Genre: Black metal
- Length: 30:08
- Label: Osmose Productions
- Producers: Impaled Nazarene and Ahti Kortelainen

Impaled Nazarene chronology
Ugra-Karma (1993)	Suomi Finland Perkele (1994)	Latex Cult (1996)

Professional ratings
Review scores
Source	Rating
AllMusic	2.5/5 stars

Suomi Finland Perkele is the third full-length album by Impaled Nazarene, the last to feature both Luttinen brothers. It is infamous due to its nationalistic themes; for example, in the lyrics to "Total War - Winter War". "Suomi" is the Finnish word for Finland and "perkele" ("devil") is a common Finnish swear word.

Three versions of the sleeve exist: gold on black (OPCD 026-A), black on gold (OPCD 026-B) and black on silver (OPCD 026-C).

In 2013, Decibel ranked Suomi Finland Perkele at number 48 on its list of the Top 100 Black Metal Albums of All Time.

== Track listing ==
All tracks are written by Impaled Nazarene.

No.	Title	Length
1.	"Intro - SFP"	0:54
2.	"Vitutuksen Multihuipennus"	2:11
3.	"Blood Is Thicker Than Water"	3:30
4.	"Steelvagina"	3:05
5.	"Total War - Winter War (the intro is a cover version of NON, noise band by Boyd Rice)"	3:47
6.	"Quasb/The Burning"	4:07
7.	"Kuolema Kaikille (Paitsi Meille)"	0:51
8.	"Let's Fucking Die"	2:35
9.	"Genocide"	2:48
10.	"Ghettoblaster"	2:16
11.	"The Oath of the Goat"	4:03
Total length:		30:08

== Personnel ==
- Mika Luttinen: Vocals
- Kimmo Luttinen: Drums, Guitars
- Jarno Antilla: Guitars
- Taneli Jarva: Bass
