= Paramount Evil =

Studio album by Impiety
- Released: October 18, 2004
- Recorded: 2004
- Studios: Ambox Studios (Querétaro, Mexico)
- Genres: Death metal, thrash metal, black metal
- Length: 41:50 (without bonus track) 45:20 (with Sepultura cover)
- Label: Agonia Records
- Producer: Shyaithan

Impiety chronology
Kaos Kommand 696 (2002)	Paramount Evil (2004)	Formidonis Nex Cultus (2007)

Paramount Evil was the fourth studio album by Impiety released on October 18, 2004. Pete Helkamp of Angelcorpse contributed vocals on the track Carbonized. Four pressing formats of the album were available; regular jewel case, digipak edition with a cover of Sepultura’s Morbid Visions and sticker that was limited to 2000 copies, regular vinyl to 500 copies and 100 on picture disc. The album was licensed to Paragon Records for release in North America without the song Morbid Visions. The artwork for digipak version was painted by Erik Danielsson of Swedish black metal band Watain.

== Track listing ==
All tracks are written by Shyaithan.

No.	Title	Length
1.	"Sunrise Defloration"	6:30
2.	"Carbonized"	5:02
3.	"Indomitable Fist of Decius"	4:40
4.	"Reign the Vulture"	4:12
5.	"Adonai Made Excrement"	5:35
6.	"Pillars of Perversion"	5:05
7.	"Mighty Impiety"	5:51
8.	"Sunset Detonation"	4:55

Digipak and vinyl version
No.	Title	Length
9.	"Morbid Visions (Sepultura cover)"	3:30

== Personnel ==
- Shyaithan – vocals, bass
- Antimo Buonanno – guitar
- Eduardo Guevara – guitar
- Oscar Garcia – drums

=== Additional personnel ===
- Christophe Szpajdel – logo
