= Absence of War Does Not Mean Peace =

Studio album by Impaled Nazarene
- Released: 13 November 2001
- Recorded: July–August 2001 (recorded at Astia Studio; mixed and mastered at Finnvox Studio)
- Genre: Black metal, punk rock, blackened thrash, crust punk
- Length: 36:28
- Label: Osmose
- Producer: Anssi Kippo and Impaled Nazarene

Impaled Nazarene chronology
| Nihil (2000) | Absence of War Does Not Mean Peace (2001) | All That You Fear (2003) |

Absence of War Does Not Mean Peace is the seventh full-length release by Finnish black metal band Impaled Nazarene. The release was recorded at Anssi Kippo's Astia Studio from July to August 2001.

A music video was made for "Hardboiled and Still Hellbound", featuring former Finnish porn star Rakel Liekki.

== Track listing ==
- All songs written by Impaled Nazarene, except where noted.
1. Stratagem 1:12
2. Absence of War 2:27
3. The Lost Art of Goat Sacrificing 3:54
4. Prequel to Bleeding (Angels III) 2:48
5. Hardboiled and Still Hellbound 2:31
6. Into the Eye of the Storm 4:44
7. Before the Fallout 1:05 (written by Trollhorn)
8. Humble Fuck of Death 2:53
9. Via Dolorosa 4:08
10. Nyrkillä Tapettava Huora 3:00
11. Never Forgive 3:58
12. Satan Wants You Dead 0:16
13. The Madness Behind 4:12

== Personnel ==
- Mika Luttinen – vocals
- Teemu Raimoranta – guitar
- Onraj 9 mm – guitar
- Arc v 666 – bass
- Repe Misanthrope – drums, synthesizer
- With Anssi Kippo: Lead Guitar on tracks 5 & 10

== Production ==
- Arranged By Impaled Nazarene
- Produced By Impaled Nazarene & Anssi Kippo
- Recorded & Engineered By Anssi Kippo; Assistant Engineer: Sauli Impola
- Mixed By Mikko Karmila
- Mastered By Mika Jussila
