= Impiety (band) =

Singaporean black metal band

- Origin: Singapore
- Genres: Black metal; death metal
- Years active: 1990–present
- Labels: Agonia; Dies Irae; Drakkar; Heavy Metal Super Star; InCoffin; Osmose; Pulverised; Samhain; Shivadarshana; Ultra-Hingax; Unholy Horde
- Members: Shyaithan (1990–present; vocals, bass) (formerly guitar); Iszar – (2017–present; guitars); Nizam Aziz - (2012-present; guitars); Dizazter – (2011–present; drums)
- Past members: See below.
- Website: www.mightyimpiety.com

Impiety is a Singaporean black metal band, formed in early 1990 by Shyaithan (vocals/guitar/bass) and drummer Necro-Angelfornicator. They are one of the first extreme metal bands from Singapore.

== Biography ==
Impiety was formed in January 1990 by guitarist/bassist/vocalist Shyaithan and drummer Necro-Angelfornicator, influenced by Hellhammer, Sarcófago, Possessed, Destruction, Bathory, Angelcorpse and early Morbid Angel. The two recorded a rehearsal demo/promo in early 1991 that was never officially released. After a few line-up changes, the band (now consisting of Shyaithan with guitarist Xxxul and drummer Iblyss) recorded its first official demo, 1992's Ceremonial Necrochrist Redesecration, which made a name for the band amongst underground tape-traders. Xxxul left Impiety in 1993, replaced with Leprophiliac Rex on guitars. This trio signed to Shivadarshana Records and recorded their first 7-inch single, Salve the Goat... Iblis Excelsi, in 1993, which was an improvement in sound and execution. The single was later licensed to American label Fudgeworthy, who pressed it onto marbel vinyl.

Following the release of Salve the Goat..., Impiety added Almarhum Abyydos on lead and rhythm guitars. Rex moved to bass and Shyaithan sang. They recorded their debut album, Asateerul Awaleen, for Shivadarshana, in 1994. Despite its raw production, the album received positive reviews. The five-song MCD Funeralight was recorded for release in early 1997, but as Shivadarshana had folded, the EP came out as a limited edition cassette through Malaysian label Ultra-Hingax, until Agonia's 2007 re-release. Shortly afterwards, Iblyss and Abyydos left the group, Abyydos to fulfill his national service requirements, and Shyaithan recruited new members for live shows in early 1997.

This new line-up, consisting of Shyaithan (vocals), guitarist Fyraun 95 and ex-Libation drummer Dajjal Yang Maseh Dara (with session bassist, Abattory's Kravnos), recorded Impiety's breakthrough album, Skullfucking Armageddon, in 1999. A considerable improvement over previous efforts, the record was initially released through Dies Irae Records, but subsequently through the cult French label Drakkar and Germany's Iron Pegasus Records, the latter on limited edition vinyl and picture disc. Dajjal left the band shortly after the recording to join death metal act Abattoir, in turn to be replaced on drums by ex-Abhorer and Abattoir member Dagoth. Around this time, the band also released a split 7-inch EP with Paul Ledney's US group Profanatica, through US label Samhain Records.

In 2000, further line-up changes were to trouble the band when Fyraun 95 left the band, allegedly imprisoned for two years for possession of heroin prior to a planned Asian and European tour. However, with the addition of former guitarist Xxxul and new bassist Demonomancer, Impiety undertook their Asian Hell tour and the four-date European mini-tour Skullfucking Euro Armageddon 2000 over the summer. Two months after returning to Singapore, drummer Dagoth left the band to join Demonification and was replaced by Fauzzt (of Hail), before Impiety returned to Europe for the 15-date, six country Skullfucking Euro Battlestorms 2000 tour, courtesy of Drakkar (who re-released the album to coincide with the tour). The tour was successful and led to the band signing a three-album deal with French label Osmose in 2001, though both Xxxul and Demonomancer left following the tour.

Impiety recorded their third album, Kaos Kommand 696, in three weeks during July 2002 at Berno Studios in Sweden. The recording line-up consisted of Shyaithan (bass/vocals), Fauzzt (drums) and the returning Fyraun (guitar). Extensive touring followed, particularly in South-East Asia, including such festivals as the Annual God Beheading Live Ritual (Bangkok, Thailand), Formoz Open Air Festival (Taiwan) and the Under the Black Sun festival in Germany. Both Fauzzt and Fyraun left in December 2003, and the decision was made to leave Osmose. Shyaithan set up an international line-up by recruiting the Mexican musicians Oscar Garcia (Hacavitz drummer) and Antimo Buonnao (Blood Reaping and Hacavitz lead guitarist) to the Impiety fold in 2004. The band also signed a two-album deal with Polish label Agonia around the same time. The new line-up recorded three songs at Ambox Studios in Querétaro, Mexico, that were released as Impiety's half of the Two Majesties split EP with Thai act Surrender of Divinity (Unholy Horde Records, 2004).

In 2004, Impiety released a new album, Paramount Evil. Due to depiction of Auschwitz and the practices of Josef Mengele in the lyrics of the song Carbonized in the album, Impiety was accused of supporting Nazism and anti-Semitism. Shyaithan denied all allegations and clarified that they are anti-religion instead.

After the recruitment of Blood Reaping's Eduardo Guevara, Impiety recorded the eight tracks of their fourth album, Paramount Evil, at Ambox Studios in 2004. Reception was again positive and further touring ensued, including the nine-date Mexican Assault Tour in August 2004 and a five-date Asian Desecration Tour during December 2004 – January 2005. Following the cancellation of a number of European tours in 2004 and 2005, Shyaithan was forced to call an end to his Mexican alliance in mid-2006 owing to the costs associated with the large distances prohibiting rehearsing, recording and playing live. A new Asian line-up consisting of Shyaithan, Arbitrary Element's Tremor (drums), Dusk's Iron Shaikh (bass) and Absence of the Sacred's Mike Priest (guitars) was brought together and resulted in the Tormentors of Tijuana live album on Japan's cult Heavy Metal Super Star Records (2007) and the studio effort Formidonis Nex Cultus, once again for Agonia.

In 2008, Impiety released the 18 Atomic Years – Satanniversary double CD through Pulverised and double LP through Agonia. This was followed by an Impiety/Abhorrence split 7-inch EP, featuring exclusive tracks. Later in 2008, a new 5 track MCD entitled Dominator was released. The band headlined its own 23 date European tour soon after.

The sixth album Terroreign was released in 2009, featuring Rangel Arroyo of Abhorrence of guitar. In February 2010 a new EP called Goatfather was released via Basement Records. The months after, a tour of 22 dates followed throughout Europe accompanied by Swedish black metal band Setherial. In the meantime, HMSS released a second live LP, Tormentors of Nagoya, which was recorded a few months before. Later, the band announced a seventh album entitled Worshippers of the Seventh Tyranny, featuring Fabio Zperandio as a special guest on guitar solos; the album was released on 24 January 2011. The band released their next studio album, Ravage & Conquer, in 2012.

Impiety released their first studio album in eight years, Versus All Gods, on 20 January 2020. They are currently working on a follow-up album, scheduled to be released in 2023 via Listenable Records.

== Line-up ==
=== Current line-up ===
- Shyaithan (1990–present; vocals, bass) (formerly guitar)
- Iszar – (2017–present; guitars)
- Nizam Aziz – (2012–present; guitars)
- Dizazter – (2011–present; drums)

=== Former members ===
Guitar:

- Xxxul (1991–1993; 2000)
- Leprophiliac Rex (1993–1994; also of Libation)
- Al-Marhum Abyydos (1994–1997)
- Fyraun (1997–2000, 2002–2003; also of Profancer, Sadiztik Impaler, Xasthur (Sgp))
- Antimo Buonnano (2004–2006; also of Blood Reaping, Demonized (Mex), Disgorge (Mex), Domain (Mex), Hacavitz, Profanator, Ravager)
- Eduardo Guevara (2004–2006; also of Blood Reaping, Cenotaph (Mex), Hacavitz, Raped God 666, Rapture (Mex))
- Mike Priest (2007–2008; also of Absence of the Sacred)
- Itaru Sayashi (2009–2010; also of Cohol)
- Rangel Arroyo (2008–2009, 2009–2010; also of Abhorrence (Bra))
- Eskathon – (2010–2011)
- Guh Lu – (2010–2012)
- Deimos – (2011; also Livyatan)

Bass:

- Leprophiliac Rex (1994–1997; also of Libation)
- Kravnos (session, 1999; also of Abattory)
- Demonomancer (2000–2007; also of Balberith)
- Iron Shaikh (2007; also of Dusk (Pak), Northern Alliance)
- Guh Lu (2012)

Drums:

- Necro-Angelfornicator (1990–1991)
- Iblyss (1991–1997; also of Abhorer, As Sahar)
- Dajjal (1997–1999; also of Abattory)
- Dagoth (1999–2000; also of Abattory, Abhorer, Profancer, Xasthur (Sgp))
- Fauzzt (2000–2003; also of As Sahar, Chaos Regal, Hail, Kibosh, Sibyl Kismet, Meltingsnow, Rejex)
- Tremor (2007–2009; also of Arbitrary Element, Battlestorm, Bunuh, Cardiac Necropsy, Dusk (Pak), Ilemauzar, Sihir, Soul Devour, Wormrot, Zushakon)
- Akihiro Tsunoda (2009–2010; also of Woundeep)
- Oscar Garcia (2004–2006, 2007, 2009–2010; also of Demonized (Mex), Domain (Mex), Hacavitz, Ravager)
- Andrea Janko (2010)
- Atum (2010–2011)
- Maelstrom (2011)
- Disaster (2011 – )

== Discography ==
=== Demos ===
- Rehearsal Demo (demo, 1991)
- Ceremonial Necrochrist Redesecration (demo, 1992)

=== EPs ===
- Salve The Goat...Iblis Exelsi (EP, Shivadarshana Records, 1993)
- Funeralight (EP, Ultra-Hingax, 1997; reissued by Agonia Records, 2006)
- Unholy Masters of Darkness (split 7-inch EP with Profanatica, Samhain Records, 1999)
- Two Majesties: An Arrogant Alliance of Satan's Extreme Elite (split 7-inch EP with Surrender of Divinity, Unholy Horde Records, 2004)
- Two Barbarians (split 7-inch EP with Abhorrence, Agonia Records, 2008)
- Dominator (EP, Pulverised Records, 2008)
- Goatfather (EP, Basement Records, 2010)
- Advent of ... (EP, Pulverised Records, 2011)

=== Albums ===
- Asateerul Awaleen (LP, Shivardarshana Records, 1996; reissued by Agonia Records, 2004)
- Skullfucking Armageddon (LP, Dies Irae Records, 1999; reissued by Drakkar, 2000)
- Kaos Kommand 696 (LP, Osmose, 2002)
- Paramount Evil (LP, Agonia Records, 2004)
- Tormentors of Tijuana (live LP, Heavy Metal Super Star Records, 2007)
- Formidonis Nex Cultus (LP, Agonia Records, 2007)
- 18 Atomic Years Satanniversary (compilation double LP, Agonia / Pulverised Records, 2008)
- Terroreign (LP, Agonia Records, 2009)
- Tormentors of Nagoya (live LP, Heavy Metal Super Star Records, 2010)
- Worshippers of the Seventh Tyranny (LP, Agonia Records, 2011)
- Ravage & Conquer (LP, Agonia Records, 2012)
- Versus All Gods (LP, Evil Dead Production, 2020)
