= Metalucifer =

Japanese heavy metal band

- Origin: Kuwana, Japan
- Genres: Heavy metal, speed metal
- Years active: 1995–present
- Labels: Iron Pegasus Records
- Members: Gezolucifer (Masaki Tachi); Blumi; Elizaveat; Elizabigore; Tormentor
- Past members: Samm (Shinji Tachi); Menzorugen; Bill Andrews

Metalucifer is a Japanese heavy metal band formed by Gezolucifer (of Sabbat) in 1995. Adopting the musical style of early NWOBHM and building upon it, they achieved underground celebrity, especially in Scandinavia. Their pure heavy metal approach, and their unadulterated use of the words "Heavy Metal" in song titles has gained them fame, as their music strives to capture the essence of what they think "heavy metal" should be.

== Name ==
The name Metalucifer was taken from the classic Sabbat song "Metalucifer And Evilucifer", meaning, according to the band, "King of the Heavy Metal Hell".

== Members ==
These are the people who have played in Metalucifer between 1995 and 2003, all releases and concerts included:

- Gezolucifer (Masaki Tachi): also known as Gezol. Lead vocals and bass guitar (from Sabbat)
- Elizaveat: guitar and drums (from Sabbat)
- Elizabigore: guitar (from Gore)
- Bill Andrews: drums (ex-Death and ex-Massacre)
- Tormentor: drums (from Desaster)
- Samm: guitar (from Magnesium, ex-Sacrifice, ex-Sabbat)
- Blumi: guitar (from Metal Inquisitor)
- Menzorugen: bass (from Gore)
- Elizavitebro (from The Chasm)
- Brazilion
- Damiazell (Sabbat)

== Discography ==
=== Studio albums ===
- Heavy Metal Drill (Metal Proof, Japan 1996)
- Heavy Metal Chainsaw (Iron Pegasus, Germany 2001)
- Heavy Metal Bulldozer (Iron Pegasus, Germany 2009)

=== EPs ===
- Heavy Metal Hunter (Metal Proof, Japan 1996)
- Heavy Metal Ninja (Iron Oxide, 2022)

=== Singles ===
- Warriors Again / Soul Of Warriors (Iron Pegasus, Germany 2000)
- Warriors Ride On THe Chariots (Iron Pegasus, Germany 2001)
- Shachahico Attack (Evil Dead Records, Japan 2005)

=== Splits ===
- Evil Dream / Asian Tyrants with Sabbat (Dream Evil, Italy 2008)

=== Live albums ===
- Live Drilling 2000 (The Official Bootleg) (Metalair Records, Poland 2002)
- Heavy Metal Genocide (Live in Japan 2002) (Dozin Destroyer Records, Japan 2003)
- Live Audiopain (2003)
- Live Elizaveat (2003)
- Heavy Metal NarokOsaka Chainsaw Massacre (Witchhammer Productions, Thailand 2005)

=== Compilation albums ===
- Heavy Metal Hunting 1995–2005 (Dragonight Agency & Hardsound Productions, Poland 2005)
- Bolivian Demonslaught (Rawblackult Productions, Bolivia 2008)

=== VHS ===
- Metalucifer in U.S.A. 2003 (2006)
