= Manifest (Impaled Nazarene album) =

Studio album by Impaled Nazarene
- Released: 24 October 2007
- Recorded: Between May & July 2007; Sonic Pump Studios, Helsinki
- Genre: Black metal
- Length: 50:28
- Label: Osmose
- Producer: Impaled Nazarene, Tapio Pennanen

Impaled Nazarene chronology
Pro Patria Finlandia (2006)	Manifest (2007)	Road to the Octagon (2010)

Manifest is Impaled Nazarene's tenth full-length studio album.

== Track listing ==
- All Songs Written By Impaled Nazarene, except where noted.
1. Intro: Greater Wrath - 01:21 (Repe Misanthrope, Trollhorn)
2. The Antichrist Files - 01:23
3. Mushroom Truth - 03:39
4. You Don't Rock Hard - 02:14
5. Pathogen - 03:04
6. Pandemia - 01:58
7. The Calling - 03:56
8. Funeral For Despicable Pigs - 03:33
9. Planet Nazarene - 03:51
10. Blueprint For Your Culture's Apocalypse - 02:49
11. Goat Justice - 02:29
12. Die Insane - 03:55
13. Original Pig Rig - 03:42
14. Suicide Song - 03:26
15. When Violence Commands The Day - 03:34
16. Dead Return - 05:34

== Personnel ==
- Mikaakim (Mika Luttinen): All Vocals
- Anttila (Jarmo Anttila): Lead Guitar
- Tuomio (Tuomio Louhio): Rhythm Guitar
- Arc Basstard (Arc V 666): Bass
- Repe Misanthrope: Drums

== Production ==
- Produced By Impaled Nazarene & Tapio Pennanen
- Recorded, Engineered & Mixed By Tapio Pennanen
- Mastered By Mika Jussila
