= Abominator (band) =

Australian black/death metal band

- Origin: Melbourne, Australia
- Genres: Blackened death metal Thrash metal
- Years active: 1994–present
- Labels: Osmose Records, Displeased Records, Necropolis Records
- Members: Andrew "Undertaker" Gillon; Chris "Volcano" Broadway; Valak Exhumer
- Past members: Max Krieg; Damon Burr aka 'Damon Bloodstorm'; Dave Deathsaw; Gary Gestapo; Steve Undinism Culpitt

Abominator is an Australian black/death metal band formed in Melbourne in 1994. Their lyrics deal with war and spirituality. They have been compared to Angelcorpse and Morbid Angel.

== History ==
Andrew "Undertaker" Gillon and Chris "Volcano" Broadway (formerly of Deströyer 666) formed Abominator in Melbourne in 1994. They self-released their first, six-track demo, Barbarian War Worship, in May 1995, which featured. It was later rereleased as a split with Swedish death metal band Mornaland. In late 1995, Dave Deathsaw (guitars) and Gary Gestapo (bass) joined the lineup and performed numerous shows, notably with war metal band Bestial Warlust. That band's singer, Damon Bloodstorm (bass, vocals), joined Abominator the same year, and Gary Gestapo left.

In 1997, they recorded the demo The Conqueror Possessed. A year later, Dave Deathsaw departed the band.

Abominator signed with Necropolis Records and achieved success in the US. They released Damnations Prophecy, and recorded a track for Necropolis' 1999 compilation album, Thrashing Holocaust. Around 2000, they began writing and recording their next album, Subersives for Lucifer, but Necropolis dropped them from the label. Abominator signed with Osmose Records, and Subversives for Lucifer was released under that label. After the release of this album, Damon Bloodstorm departed the band.

In early 2001, singer Max Krieg joined the band. They appeared in Osmose Records' "World Domination" DVD in early 2002, and recorded their next album, a limited edition LP titled Nuctemeron Descent, later that year and released it in 2003. The marketing campaign for this album was successful, and Abominator toured with Deströyer 666, Hobbs' Angel of Death and Mayhem, and appeared on "Osmose NoisyMotions", a two-and-a-half-hour DVD featuring bands such as Immortal, Dark Tranquility and Absu. Abominator was booked to play in the Bloodlust 2004 festival, but Krieg quit the band due to drug-related and emotional problems, forcing Abominator to cancel all remaining shows. Osmose dropped them in 2004.

Shortly after that, the band signed a two-album deal with Displeased Records, and released The Eternal Conflagration in May 2006.

== Discography ==
- Barbarian War Worship, Demo, 1995
- The Conqueror Possessed, Demo, 1997
- Prelude to World Funeral..., Split, 1997
- Damnation's Prophecy, Album, 1999
- Subversives for Lucifer, Album, 2001
- Nuctemeron Descent, Album, 2003
- The Eternal Conflagration, Album, 2006
- Evil Proclaimed, Album, 2015
- The Fire Brethren, Album, 2025
