= Advent of... =

EP by Impiety
- Released: February 15, 2011
- Recorded: January 2011 at the Music City Studios in Montebelluna, Italy
- Genre: Black metal, death metal, thrash metal
- Length: 21:12
- Label: Pulverised
- Producer: Shyaithan

Impiety chronology
Worshippers of the Seventh Tyranny (2011)	Advent of... (2011)	Ravage and Conquer (2012)

Advent of... (full title Advent of the Nuclear Baphomet) is the fifth EP released by the Singaporean black metal artist Impiety. It was recorded in January 2011, and released on February 15, 2011. The mini-album was made available in super jewel box through Pulverised Records. Vinyl version was released by Agonia Records under licensed from Pulverised, limited to 800 copies with first 300 copies pressed on green, brown haze vinyl and the remaining 500 on regular olive green color. Both LPs came with insert, A2 size poster and engraved B-sides.

== Track listing ==
No.	Title	Length
1.	"Advent of the Nuclear Baphomet"	6:39
2.	"Ave Sathanas"	6:22
3.	"Blood Ritual Defamation"	8:11

== Credits ==
- Shyaithan – Vocals, bass, music and lyrics, producer
- Eskathon – Lead solos, guitar
- Kekko – Guitar
- Atum – Drums and percussion
- Nicolo Gasparini – Engineer
- Alekht – Latin translation
- Lord Sickness – Cover art
- Lord Perversor – Layout
- David Dornave – Live photos in Vienna, Austria during December 2010
- Christophe Szpajdel – Logo
