= Kaos Kommand 696 =

Studio album by Impiety
- Released: November 4, 2002
- Recorded: July, 2002 at Berno Studio, Malmö, Sweden
- Genres: Death metal, thrash metal, black metal
- Length: 39:40 (regular version) 44:30 (limited edition)
- Label: Osmose
- Producers: Impiety and Henrik Larsson

Impiety chronology
| Skullfucking Armageddon (1999) | Kaos Kommand 696 (2002) | Paramount Evil (2004) |

Kaos Kommand 696 is the third album by Singaporean black metal band Impiety, released in 2002 through Osmose Productions.

The album is available in both regular and limited edition, the latter which contains two bonus tracks. Digipak version is limited to 4,000 copies and 500 on vinyl with the same bonus tracks. The artwork on the left is for digipak release while regular cover is on the right.

It was rated a 2.5 out of 4 by Christopher J. Kelter of Rough Edge.

== Track listing ==
All tracks are written by Impiety except where noted.

| No. | Title | Length |
|---|---|---|
| 1. | "Christfuckingchrist" | 4:55 |
| 2. | "Apokalyptik Nuklear Battlebeasts" | 3:19 |
| 3. | "Wardaemonic Overkill" | 4:50 |
| 4. | "Atomic Wrath of Azzazzel" | 5:37 |
| 5. | "Bestial Genocidal Goatvomit" | 4:45 |
| 6. | "Bloodred Angelshred" | 5:25 |
| 7. | "Abominate, Fornicate, Desecrate!" | 4:32 |
| 8. | "Kaos Kommand 696" | 6:17 |

Digipak bonus tracks
| No. | Title | Length |
|---|---|---|
| 9. | "Black Church (Sextrash cover)" | 1:55 |
| 10. | "Goddess of Perversity (Blasphemy cover)" | 2:55 |

== Credits ==
- Shyaithan – vocals, bass guitar
- Fyraun – All guitar
- Fauzzt – drums
- Recorded and mixed in July 2002, at Berno Studio, Malmö, Sweden
- Produced by Impiety and Henrik Larsson
- Engineered, mixed and mastered by Henrik Larsson
- Cover art by Jean Pascal Fournier
- Limited edition cover art and illustration by Desmond Sia
- Logo by Christophe Szpajdel
- Art and layout direction by Shyaithan
- Layout and design by Christophe Herbaut and Impiety
- Photos by Shameem
- Additional vocals on 'Bestial Genocidal Goatvomit' by Ustumallagam of Denial of God
