= Nihil (Impaled Nazarene album) =

Studio album by Impaled Nazarene
- Released: 16 June 2000
- Recorded: August–September 1999
- Genre: Black metal
- Length: 32:15
- Label: Osmose Productions
- Producer: Anssi Kippo

Impaled Nazarene chronology
Rapture (1998)	Nihil (2000)	Absence of War Does Not Mean Peace (2001)

Nihil is the sixth full-length release by Impaled Nazarene. It was released on 16 June 2000 through Osmose Productions. Alexi Laiho of Children of Bodom plays guitar on the album. Laiho has also composed songs "Cogito Ergo Sum" and "Zero Tolerance". The album recently entered Germany's Index List which means the album may not be advertised in public or sold to minors. The song "Zero Tolerance" is infamous due to its homophobic lyrics (it's not included in the booklet in some editions).

The album was rated an eight out of ten by Chronicles of Chaos.

== Track listing ==
1. "Cogito Ergo Sum" – 2:10 (Laiho, Luttinen)
2. "Human-Proof" – 4:38 (Kellokoski, Luttinen)
3. "Wrath of the Goat" – 1:22 (Kellokoski, Luttinen)
4. "Angel Rectums Still Bleed – The Sequel" – 2:42 (Antilla, Luttinen)
5. "Post Eclipse Era" – 4:21 (Kellokoski, Luttinen)
6. "Nothing Is Sacred" – 2:19 (Kellokoski, Luttinen)
7. "Zero Tolerance" – 1:52 (Laiho, Luttinen)
8. "Assault the Weak" – 3:49 (Antilla, Kellokoski, Luttinen)
9. "How the Laughter Died" – 4:07 (Kellokoski, Luttinen)
10. "Nihil" – 4:55 (Luttinen)

== Personnel ==
- Mika Luttinen – vocals
- Jarno Anttila – rhythm guitar
- Alexi Laiho – lead guitar
- Jani Lehtosaari – bass
- Reima Kellokoski – drums

== Production ==
- Arranged By Impaled Nazarene
- Produced, Recorded, Engineered & Mixed By Anssi Kippo
- Mastered By Mika Jussila
