= Minenwerfer (band) =

American black metal band

- Origin: Sacramento, California, U.S.
- Genre: Black metal
- Years active: 2007–2014, 2016–present
- Label: Osmose
- Members: Bret Tardiff; Nick Liuzzi
- Past members: Patrick Jimmose; Jim Boots; Pete Chavez; Trevor Deschryver

Minenwerfer is an American black metal band founded in 2007 in Sacramento, California.

== History ==
The band started in 2007 as a solo project of multi-instrumentalist Bret Tardiff ("Generalfeldmarschall Kriegshammer"). He released a lo-fi demo in December 2007, but had no long-term plans. Patrick Jimmose ("Oberstleutnant Angeltits") joined him later. They recorded debut studio album Volkslieder, with improved production quality. They released a split single with martial industrial band Striider shortly after.

Martial industrial elements appeared on the band's second studio album, Nihilistischen, released in May 2012. Recording in a studio resulted in another improvement in sound quality. Jimmose was not very active at that point. He left and was replaced with Nick Liuzzi ("Wachtmeister Verwüstung").

Minenwerfer temporarily disbanded in 2014 due to a lack of time and financial issues. They collaborated with other metal bands (Sturmtiger, 1914, Kommandant) on several split albums before reforming in 2016. In August 2018, the band announced that they had begun recording their third studio album. On September 7, 2019, it was announced that Alpenpässe was finished and would be released presently. Three days later, the cover art, overall theme, and one song were unveiled. The album was released on October 31.

The band's fourth album, Feuerwalze, was released in 2023. The band put out the digital version on February 25 due to an online leak. The cassette, CD, and 12" vinyl versions were released on March 10, 2023, as planned. The album focuses on the battle of the Somme.

== Musical style, influences and theme ==
The founder of the band, Bret Tardiff, said Minenwerfer's sound was inspired by many other black metal bands, namely Marduk, Endstille, Hate Forest and Impaled Nazarene.

Minenwerfer focuses on the First World War and nihilism in their songs, featuring English and German lyrics. This is reflected in their title (Minenwerfer was a type of mortar used by Germany in the First World War) and logo. Until the release of Kriegserklärung in 2014, all records simply featured the band's name in gothic writing. Since the EP was written from the point of view of Austria-Hungary, the Austrian-Hungarian coat of arms was present instead. Afterwards, the band's logo became the iron cross, as the lyrics focused on Germany once again. Tardiff stated in a 2019 interview that the coat of arms would be seen again; it appeared on the 2019 Alpenpässe.

== Members ==
Current

- Bret Tardiff ("Generalfeldmarschall Kriegshammer") – vocals, rhythm guitar, bass
- Nick Liuzzi ("Wachtmeister Verwüstung") – guitar, drums

Former

- Patrick Jimmose ("Oberstleutnant Angeltits") – guitar
- Jim Boots ("Feldwebel Rabenkrähe") – drums
- Pete Chavez ("Oberst Gemetzel") – drums
- Trevor Deschryver ("Hauptmann Hymen Burster Von Richthofen") – drums (live only)

== Discography ==
=== Studio albums ===
- Volkslieder (2010)
- Nihilistischen (2012)
- Alpenpässe (2019)
- Feuerwalze (2023)

=== EPs ===
- Der rote Kampfflieger (2011)
- Kriegserklärung (2023)

=== Compilation albums ===
- Vorleben Erinnerung (2020)

=== Demos ===
- Kaiserreich (2007)
- Alle beruhigen sich auf der West Vorderseite (2009)
- Vorwärts (2010)
