= Subversives for Lucifer =

Subversives For Lucifer

Studio album by Abominator
- Released: 10 October 2001
- Genre: Blackened death metal
- Length: 48:41
- Label: Osmose Productions

Abominator chronology
Damnation's Prophecy (1999)	Subversives For Lucifer (2001)	Nuctemeron Descent (2003)

Subversives For Lucifer is the second full length studio album by the blackened death metal band Abominator. It was released in 2001 on Osmose Productions.

== Track listing ==
1. Intro / Renegades at Hell's Command - 6:44
2. Desolate Feast - 5:20
3. Carnivorous Strike of the Knife - 6:27
4. As God of a Heretic Tribe - 5:35
5. Ignite the Ceremonial Burning - 5:29
6. From Flesh to Fire - 6:06
7. Domain of Iblis - 4:50
8. Subversives for Lucifer / Outro - 8:10
