= Unhealthy Opera =

Studio album by Yyrkoon
- Released: 2006
- Genre: Death metal
- Length: 49:02
- Label: Osmose Productions, The End Records (in U.S.)
- Producer: Jacob Hansen

Yyrkoon chronology
Occult Medicine (2004)	Unhealthy Opera (2006)

Professional ratings
Review scores
Source	Rating
Allmusic	2.5/5 stars
Blabbermouth	7.5/10 stars

Unhealthy Opera is the fourth full-length studio album by the French death metal band Yyrkoon. The symbol on the cover is the yellow sign from the book The King in Yellow.

== Track listing ==
- All songs written and arranged by Yyrkoon (2006 Les Editions Hurlantes/Fairplay).
1. "Something Breathes" – 0:21
2. "Unhealthy Opera" – 3:44
3. "From the Depths" – 4:28
4. "Avatar Ceremony" – 4:10
5. "Temple of Infinity" – 2:34
6. "Abnormal Intrusion" – 4:20
7. "Screaming Shores" – 4:02
8. "The Book" – 3:23
9. "Horror from the Sea" – 3:36
10. "Lair…" – 1:07
11. "…Of Madness" – 4:38
12. "Injecting Dementia" – 5:57
13. "Signs" – 6:08 (bonus track)

== Personnel ==
- Stephane Souteyrand: Vocals, Lead & Rhythm Guitars
- Geoffrey Gautier: Lead & Rhythm Guitars
- Victorien Vilchez: Bass, Acoustic Guitars
- Laurent Harrouart: Drums, Percussion
- With Andy Larocque: Guest Lead Guitar on track 9

== Production ==
- Recorded, Produced, Engineered, Mixed & Mastered By Jacob Hansen
