= Occult Medicine =

Studio album by Yyrkoon
- Released: 2004
- Recorded: November 2003
- Genre: Death metal
- Length: 46:15
- Label: Osmose Productions, The End Records (USA)
- Producer: Jacob Hansen

Yyrkoon chronology
Dying Sun (2002)	Occult Medicine (2004)	Unhealthy Opera (2006)

Professional ratings
Review scores
Source	Rating
Allmusic	3/5 stars

Occult Medicine is the third full-length studio album by the French death metal band Yyrkoon. It was released in 2006 on Osmose Productions records.

== Track listing ==
- All Songs Written & Arranged By Yyrkoon. (Les Editions Hurlantes)
1. "Intro" – 0:16
2. "Doctor X" – 3:56
3. "Censored Project" – 4:35
4. "Blasphemy" – 4:10
5. "Occult Medicine" – 6:51
6. "Revenant Horde" – 4:49
7. "Reversed World" – 4:30
8. "Trapped into Life" – 4:17
9. "Surgical Distortion" – 4:37
10. "Schyzophrenic Carnage" – 3:39
11. "Erase the Past" – 4:35

== Personnel ==
- Stephane Souteyrand: Vocals, Rhythm & Lead Guitar
- Geoffrey Gautier: Lead & Rhythm Guitar
- Victorien Vilchiz: Bass
- Dirk Verbeuren: Drums, Percussion

== Production ==
- Produced, Recorded, Engineered & Mixed By Jacob Hansen at Hansen Studios, November 2003
