= Road to the Octagon =

Studio album by Impaled Nazarene
- Released: 2010
- Recorded: July 2010 at City Lights Studios
- Genre: Black metal
- Length: 33:30
- Label: Osmose
- Producer: Impaled Nazarene

Impaled Nazarene chronology
Manifest (2007)	Road to the Octagon (2010)	Vigorous and Liberating Death (2014)

Road to the Octagon is the eleventh full-length studio album from Finnish black metal band Impaled Nazarene. It was released, as are all of their albums thus far, on Osmose Productions in 2010. It also marked the first time that they were without a co-producer (Tapio Penannen co-produced their last few).

== Track listing ==
- All songs written by Impaled Nazarene, except where noted (published By Les Editions Hurlantes).
1. "Enlightenment Process" 2:19
2. "The Day Of Reckoning" 2:48
3. "Corpses" 2:45
4. "Under Attack" (Mika "Sluti666" Luttinen, Jarno Anttila) 2:44
5. "Tentacles of the Octagon" 1:33
6. "Reflect on This" 2:17
7. "Convulsing Uncontrollably" 2:15
8. "Cult of the Goat" 3:09
9. "Gag Reflex" 3:00
10. "The Plan" 2:01
11. "Silent & Violent Type" 2:19
12. "Execute Tapeworm Extermination" 2:10
13. "Rhetoric Infernal" 4:23

== Personnel ==
Note: The band have, for most of their career, been a quintet. For this recording however, they became a quartet when long-serving lead player Jarno Anttila left the band after this recording (though he did contribute to the writing of the record). For this disc, the personnel is as follows:

- Mika Luttinen – vocals
- Tomi Ullgren – lead and rhythm guitars
- Mikael Arnkil – bass
- Reima Kellokoski – drums, percussion

== Production ==
- Arranged and produced by Impaled Nazarene
- Recorded and mixed by Max "Miami/Safari" Kostermaa (Mixed at Studio Fungus, August 2010)
- Mastered by Mika Jussila (Finnvox Studios, August 2010)
