= All That You Fear =

Studio album by Impaled Nazarene
- Released: 2003
- Recorded: July 2003
- Genre: Black metal
- Length: 42:50
- Labels: Osmose, The End
- Producers: Impaled Nazarene and Anssi Kippo

Impaled Nazarene chronology
Absence of War Does Not Mean Peace (2001)	All That You Fear (2003)	Pro Patria Finlandia (2006)

Professional ratings
Review scores
Source	Rating
AllMusic	4/5 stars
Scream Magazine	4/6 stars

All That You Fear is the eighth full-length release by Finnish black metal band Impaled Nazarene. The release was recorded at Anssi Kippo’s Astia Studios in July 2003. The sixth song of the album, “Suffer In Silence”, is dedicated to the band’s late guitarist, Teemu “Somnium” Raimoranta who died from falling from a railroad bridge a year prior to the album’s release. A music video was created for “Armageddon Death Squad.”

== Track listing ==
No.	Title	Length
1.	"Kohta Ei Naura Enää Jeesuskaan"	2:14
2.	"Armageddon Death Squad"	2:56
3.	"The Endless War"	4:13
4.	"The Maggot Crusher"	3:42
5.	"Curse of the Dead Medusa"	3:25
6.	"Suffer in Silence"	4:13
7.	"Halo of Flies"	2:21
8.	"Recreate Thru Hate"	2:15
9.	"Goat Seeds of Doom"	3:36
10.	"Even More Pain"	2:44
11.	"Tribulation Hell"	3:14
12.	"Urgent Need to Kill"	2:53
13.	"All That You Fear"	4:23
Total length:		42:50

== Credits and personnel ==
- Mika Luttinen – vocals (known as “Sluti666” in the liner notes)
- Tuomio – lead guitar
- Onraj 9 mm – rhythm guitar
- Arc v 666 – bass
- Repe Misanthrope – drums

Production

- Produced By Impaled Nazarene & Anssi Kippo
- Mixed By Mika Karmila
- Engineered By Anssi Kippo & Teemu Auvinen
- Mastered By Mika Jussila
