= The Eternal Conflagration =

Studio album by Abominator
- Released: May 28, 2006
- Genre: Blackened death metal
- Length: 42:04
- Label: Displeased Records

Abominator chronology
Nuctemeron Descent (2003)	The Eternal Conflagration (2006)

The Eternal Conflagration is the fourth full length studio album by the black metal band Abominator. It was released on Displeased Records in 2006. It was re-released on Die Todesrune Records, on LP format in 2007.

== Track listing ==
1. Mutilate - 4:36
2. Desecrator of Sanctuary - 5:53
3. Diabolical Darkness - 5:13
4. Sarcarium Tormentum - 5:18
5. Blasphemous Embellishment - 4:22
6. Tyrants on Your Warpath - 5:25
7. The Eternal Conflagration - 5:28
8. Hellfire Armada - 5:49
