= Salve the Goat...Iblis Exelsi =

EP by Impiety
- Released: 1993
- Recorded: 15 September 1993, The Womb of Leftness, Studio 666, Singapore
- Genre: Black metal
- Length: 9:00
- Label: Shivadarshana Records
- Producer: Impiety

Impiety chronology
Ceremonial Necrochrist Redesecration (1992)	Salve the Goat...Iblis Exelsi (1993)	Asateerul Awaleen (1996)

Salve the Goat...Iblis Exelsi is the debut EP by Singaporean black metal band Impiety. It was released in 1993, through the Dutch-based label Shivadarshana Records. Later made available as violet-colored 7" in the United States by Fudgeworthy Records.

The EP was recorded 15 September 1993, at The Womb of Leftness, Studio 666; compared to the preceding release, it was "recorded at a better studio with a more 'metal-educated' engineer. But likewise, most of the mixing and editing was personally done by me."

== Track listing ==
1. "Cuntblasphemy – Paganistic Bitchgoddess Deiimpalation" – 3:31
2. "Magick – Consecration Goatsodomy" – 5:29

== Artwork ==
The front cover shows the three band members with corpse paint and spikes in front of an inverted pentagram. The back cover features a statement insulting the early Norwegian black metal scene: "To All Norwegian 'Black-Metal' Clowns, We Desecrate your so-called Northern Kingdom & Sky of White Falseness… After which, We Baptise All of thee in Piss!!!" The band later explained that this was a reaction to a racist letter by Mortiis who had insulted them as "niggers" who had no right to play black metal.

== Personnel ==
- Shyaithan – Vocals
- Iblyss – Drums
- Leprophiliac Rex – Guitars
