= Surrender of Divinity =

Thai black metal band

- Origin: Bangkok, Thailand
- Genres: Black metal
- Years active: 1996–present
- Label: From Beyond Productions
- Members: Avaejee (vocals, bass); Sunyaluxx (drums); Whathayakorn (guitar)
- Website: Official Facebook

Surrender of Divinity is a black metal act from Bangkok, Thailand. The group was formed in 1996, and released 2 full-length albums during the 2000s. Their 2006 album Manifest Blasphemy: The Abortion of the Immaculate Conception was reviewed by Metal Hammer.

In January 2014, the band's bassist/vocalist Samon "Avaejee" Traisattha, aged 36, was stabbed to death in his own home. It is reported that he was murdered by the band's own fan, "for tarnishing Satanism". Samon's wife has confirmed that said fan was indeed visiting their home and having a drink with her husband.

== Discography ==
=== Studio albums ===
- Oriental Hell Rhythmics (2001)
- Manifest Blasphemy: The Abortion of the Immaculate Conception (2006)

=== EP ===
- Immolating the Son of the Whore (EP, 2003)

=== Demos ===
- Promo 97
- Rehearsal Demo '98

=== Split releases ===
- Christbeheaders (2000)
- Two Majesties: An Arrogant Alliance of Satan's Extreme Elite (with Impiety, 2004)
- Unholy Black War (2006)
- Sabbatical SiameseChristBeheading (with Sabbat, 2006)
- Deathstrike from the Abyss (2008)
- Surrender of Divinity / Lobotomy (split DVD/video, 2013)
- Angelslaying Christbeheading Black Fucking Metal (2013)

=== Compilation appearance ===
- Goatwrath Incarnation (2007)
