= Order from Chaos =

American extreme metal band

- Origin: Kansas City, Missouri
- Genres: Death metal, black metal
- Years active: 1987–1995
- Labels: Decapitated, Eternal Darkness, Gestapo, Ground Zero, Hexateuc Torment, Merciless, Nuclear War Now!, Osmose, Putrefaction, Shivadarshana, Wild Rags
- Past members: Pete Helmkamp; Chuck Keller; Mike Miller

Order from Chaos was an extreme metal band formed in 1987 in Kansas City, Missouri, by Pete Helmkamp, Chuck Keller, and Mike Miller. They were influential in the early U.S. black metal scene. Its members went on to form such groups as Angelcorpse, Ares Kingdom, Revenge, Vulpecula, and Kerasphorus.

== Biography ==
Pete Helmkamp (vocals/bass), Chuck Keller (guitar) and Mike Miller (drums) formed Order from Chaos in Kansas City, Missouri, in 1987. They played old-school thrash, black and death metal, influenced by Venom, Bathory and Celtic Frost. The band released three demos in 1988. A fourth, Crushed Infamy, sold 1000 copies and attracted the attention of Putrefaction Records, who released the Will to Power 7-inch EP, limited to 1100 copies. The band signed with Wild Rags in 1989, who released cassette versions of Crushed Infamy and Will to Power. The band released a final demo, Alienus Sum, in 1992, featuring three rough mixes from their debut album and a couple of rehearsal tracks. Chilean label Hexateuc Torment released an official cassette version of the demo.

Wild Rags released Order from Chaos's debut album, Stillbirth Machine, in 1992, the same year the label dropped the band. Around that time, the album was released by Greek label Decapitated Records (now Unisound Productions). This version, which differs from the Wild Rags in terms of artwork and layout and contains numerous textual errors, is considered a bootleg version by the band. The album was given official re-releases by Osmose Productions in 1998 (including the Crushed Infamy demo) and Nuclear War Now! in 2008 (on both black and clear yellow vinyl). The album has received some critical acclaim; Terrorizer included it in their "top 40 death metal albums you must hear", at number 40. James Hoare commented, "The blasphemous babysteps of Peter Helmkamp, [...] Order from Chaos courted black metal's glass shards of spite and embittered, semi-mystical worldview in an ear when the two genres were defined by their opposition, setting down the foundations for further esoteric and impenetrable coupling.".

A series of further EPs were recorded and released throughout 1994 on various labels (Jericho Trumpet on Gestapo, Live: Into Distant Fears on Eternal Darkness and Plateau of Invincibility on Shivadarshana), followed by a second full-length, Dawn Bringer, on Shivadarshana, before the band decided to call it quits in 1995. After Shivardashana folded, French label Osmose picked up tracks recorded in 1995 for Order from Chaos's third and final album and released An Ending in Fire in 1998, as well as re-releasing their debut.

Pete Helmkamp went on to form death metal act Angelcorpse, as well as writing a book on occultism, entitled The Conqueror Manifesto: Capricornus Teitan. Chuck Keller and Mike Miller went on to form retro black/thrash band Ares Kingdom and blackened death metal act Vulpecula. With interest in Order from Chaos still prevalent in the extreme metal underground, Merciless records released a compilation of demos, 1994 live tracks and rehearsal sessions, entitled Imperium - The Apocalyptic Visions, in July 2005.

== Last known line-up ==
- Pete Helmkamp (vocals, bass)
- Chuck Keller (guitar)
- Mike Miller (drums)

== Discography ==
=== Demos ===
- Demo I (self-released, January 1988)
- Inhumanities (self-released, July 1988)
- Rehearsal (self-released, 1988)
- Crushed Infamy (Wild Rags, July 1989)
- Alienus Sum (self-released, 1992; reissued by Hexateuc Torment, 1994)

=== EPs ===
- Will to Power (EP, Putrefaction / Wild Rags, 1990)
- Jericho Trumpet (7-inch EP, Gestapo, 1994)
- Live: Into Distant Fears (7-inch EP, Eternal Darkness, 1994)
- Plateau of Invincibility (10-inch EP, Shivadarshana, 1994)
- Pain Lengthens Time (unreleased EP, 1994; included with the Dawnbringer CD)
- And I Saw Eternity (EP, Ground Zero / Shivadarshana, 1996)

=== Full-length LPs ===
- Stillbirth Machine (Wild Rags, 1993; reissued by Osmose, 1998; reissued by Nuclear War Now!, 2008)
- Dawn Bringer (Shivadarshana, 1995; reissed by Fifth Division, 2003)
- An Ending in Fire (Osmose, 1998; reissued by Nuclear War Now!, 2008)
- Imperium - The Apocalyptic Visions (compilation, Merciless, 2005)
