= Ugra-Karma =

Studio album by Impaled Nazarene
- Released: 1 December 1993
- Recorded: 28 July 1993 at Tico-Tico Studios, Kemi, Finland
- Genre: Black metal
- Length: 38:27
- Label: Osmose Productions
- Producer: Ahti Kortelainen

Impaled Nazarene chronology
Tol Cormpt Norz Norz Norz... (1993)	Ugra-Karma (1993)	Suomi Finland Perkele (1994)

Alternative cover
- 1998 re-issue

Ugra-Karma is the second studio album by Finnish black metal band Impaled Nazarene. It was originally released on 1 December 1993 via Osmose Productions, and re-released in 1998 with two bonus tracks (taken from the Satanic Masowhore EP) and a different cover art, because the original one was taken without permission from a work by Madame Koslovsky; Osmose was sued because of that.

"Ugra-Karma" is a term in Sanskrit that denotes a bad, harmful action.

== Track listing ==
All tracks are written by Kimmo and Mika Luttinen, except for "Conned Thru Life" by Pete Hurley, Dean Jones and Phil Vane.

No.	Title	Length
1.	"Goatzied"	1:18
2.	"The Horny and the Horned"	3:33
3.	"Sadhu Satana"	2:32
4.	"Chaosgoat Law"	1:50
5.	"Hate"	6:00
6.	"Gott ist tot (Antichrist War Mix)"	2:58
7.	"Coraxo"	0:17
8.	"Soul Rape"	3:57
9.	"Kali Yuga"	4:21
10.	"Cyberchrist"	5:39
11.	"False Jéhova"	2:16
12.	"Sadistic 666/Under a Golden Shower"	4:19

1998 re-release bonus tracks
No.	Title	Length
13.	"Satanic Masowhore"	2:04
14.	"Conned Thru Life (Diabolical Penis Mix)" (Extreme Noise Terror cover)	1:13

== Composition ==
- The song "Hate" contains a sample from the movie The Name of the Rose.

== Personnel ==
Impaled Nazarene

- Mika Luttinen — vocals
- Kimmo Luttinen — drums, guitars
- Taneli Jarva — bass
- Jarno Anttila — guitars

Other staff

- Ahti Kortelainen — production
- Madame Koslovsky — cover art (original 1993 release; uncredited)
- Jean-Pascal Fournier — cover art (1998 re-issue)
