= Rapture (Impaled Nazarene album) =

Studio album by Impaled Nazarene
- Released: 5 May 1998
- Recorded: 1998
- Genre: Black metal
- Length: 38:50
- Label: Osmose Productions
- Producer: Impaled Nazarene

Impaled Nazarene chronology
Motörpenis (1996)	Rapture (1998)	Nihil (2000)

Rapture is the fifth full-length album of the Finnish black metal band Impaled Nazarene. It was released in 1998 on Osmose Productions.

== Track listing ==
- All Lyrics By Mika Luttinen, except where noted. All Music As Noted.
1. "Penis et Circes" – 2:35 (Music: Jani Lehtosaari)
2. "6th Degree Mindfuck" – 2:30 (Music: Lehtosaari)
3. "Iron Fist with an Iron Will" – 2:27 (Music & Lyrics: Mika Luttinen)
4. "Angel Rectums Do Bleed" – 2:00 (Music: Jarmo Anttila)
5. "We're Satan's Generation" – 2:23 (Music: Luttinen)
6. "Goatvomit and Gasmasks" – 3:31 (Music: Reima Kellokoski)
7. "Fallout Theory in Practice" – 2:22 (Music: Kellokoski)
8. "Healers of the Red Plague" – 3:37 (Music: Lahtosaari)
9. "The Pillory" – 2:01 (Lyrics & Music: Impaled Nazarene)
10. "The Return of Nuclear Gods" – 2:58 (Music: Anttila)
11. "Vitutation" – 3:22 (Music: Lehtosaari)
12. "JCS" – 2:29 (Music: Kellokoski)
13. "Inbred" – 1:37 (Music: Kellokoski)
14. "Phallus Maleficarum" – 5:45 (Music: Anttila)

== Personnel ==
- Mika Luttinen - Vocals
- Jarno Anttila - Guitar
- Jani Lehtosaari - Bass
- Reima Kellokoski - Drums, Additional Guitars

== Production ==
- Arranged & Produced By Impaled Nazarene
- Recorded, Engineered & Mixed By Ahti Hokemaa
- Mastered By Pauli Saastamoinen
