= Terroreign (Apocalyptic Armageddon Command) =

Studio album by Impiety
- Released: May 2009
- Recorded: February to March, 2009 at Studio 47, Singapore and Lab 6 Brazil
- Genres: Death metal, thrash metal, black metal
- Length: 35:44
- Label: Agonia Records
- Producer: Shyaithan

Impiety chronology
Formidonis Nex Cultus (2007)	Terroreign (Apocalyptic Armageddon Command) (2009)	Worshippers of the Seventh Tyranny (2011)

Terroreign (Apocalyptic Armageddon Command) is the sixth studio album by Singaporean black metal band Impiety, released in 2009 through Agonia Records. The album is made available as regular jewel case, limited edition digipak with sticker and vinyl. The latter is pressed to 750 limited copies; 100 on white, 400 on regular black LP and the rest 250 copies as picture disc. All vinyl version comes with an A3 landscape poster of Impiety, with some bearing Shyaithan's signature. Both Intro and Outro are composed and performed by Nuclear Holocausto Vengeance of Beherit.

== Track listing ==
All tracks are written by Shyaithan except for track 9 by Per "Dead" Ohlin.

No.	Title	Length
1.	"Intro"	0:56
2.	"Vientos De Holocausto"	2:03
3.	"Atomic Angel Assault"	5:06
4.	"Terroreign"	5:23
5.	"As Judea Burns"	4:37
6.	"Goatfather"	4:13
7.	"Bestial to the Bone"	5:06
8.	"The Black Fuck"	3:53
9.	"My Dark Subconscious (Morbid cover)"	3:41
10.	"Outro"	0:46

== Credits ==
- Shyaithan – vocals, bass, guitars, lyrics
- Rangel Arroyo – Guitar
- Tremor – Drums
- Oscar Garcia – drums (Live)
- Recorded and mixed from February to March 2009 at Sound 47 Studios Singapore and Lab 6 Brazil
- Produced by Shyaithan
- Engineered, mixed and mastered by Nizam
- All bass and guitars on this album by Shyaithan
- All lead solos by Rangel Arroyo
- My Dark Subconscious is originally recorded by Morbid
- Intro and Outro composed by Holocausto Vengeance of Beherit
- Intro and Outro voices by Shyaithan
- Cover and entire artwork by Thiti – Imperial Sickness666
- Layout by Lord Perversor
- Logo by Christophe Szpajdel
