= Vigorous and Liberating Death =

Studio album by Impaled Nazarene
- Released: 14 April, 2014
- Recorded: 2014 at City Lights Studio
- Genre: Black metal
- Length: 33:48
- Label: Osmose
- Producer: Impaled Nazarene

Impaled Nazarene chronology
Road to the Octagon (2010)	Vigorous and Liberating Death (2014)	Eight Headed Serpent (2021)

Vigorous and Liberating Death is the twelfth full-length studio album from Finnish black metal band Impaled Nazarene. It was released, as are all of their albums thus far, on Osmose Productions on 14 April 2014. The album is available on CD, gatefold LP and digital download.

In an interview on Finnish radio channel Yle X3M, the band stated that the first demos for the album were done on late 2012 but the actual recording was delayed due to issues with their then-upcoming live DVD and its promotion tour. In the same interview, Luttinen told that the album's title and lyrical themes handle death from various viewpoints: the death of Finland's and European Union's economies, the death of freedom of speech among others.

== Track listing ==
- All songs written by Impaled Nazarene.
1. "King Reborn" 2:39
2. "Flaming Sword of Satan" 3:16
3. "Pathological Hunger for Violence" 2:33
4. "Vestal Virgins" 2:44
5. "Martial Law" 2:24
6. "Riskiarvio" 3:25
7. "Apocalypse Principle" 2:39
8. "Kuoleman Varjot" 1:37
9. "Vigorous and Liberating Death" 2:38
10. "Drink Consultation" 2:21
11. "Dystopia A. S." 2:31
12. "Sananvapaus" 0:44
13. "Hostis Humani Generis" 4:17

== Personnel ==
- Mika "Sluti666" Luttinen – vocals
- Tomi "UG" Ullgren – lead and rhythm guitars
- Mikael "Arc v 666" Arnkil – bass
- Reima "Repe Misanthrope" Kellokoski – drums

== Production ==
- Arranged and produced by Impaled Nazarene
- Recorded by Tero "Max" Kostermaa at City Lights Studio, December 2013 - February 2014
- Mixed by Tero "Max" Kostermaa at Studio Fungus, February 2014
- Mastered by Mika Jussila at Finnvox Studios, February 2014

== Miscellaneous staff ==
- Artwork by Taneli Jarva

== Charts ==
Chart (2014)	Peak position
Finnish Albums (Suomen virallinen lista)	48
