= Dying Sun =

Studio album by Yyrkoon
- Released: 6 December 2002
- Recorded: EMMA Studios, Paris, Walnut Groove Studio, Proton Studio, Amiens, France
- Genre: Thrash metal, melodic death metal
- Length: 40:24
- Label: Anvil Corp.
- Producer: Stephan Brulez

Yyrkoon chronology
Oniric Transition (1998)	Dying Sun (2002)	Occult Medicine (2004)

Dying Sun is the second full-length studio album by the French death metal band Yyrkoon.

== Track listing ==
1. "Idols Are Burning" – 0:30
2. "Crystal Light" – 3:42
3. "Flight of the Titan" – 5:00
4. "The Clans" – 3:51
5. "Thrash-em All" – 6:27
6. "Gods of Silver" – 2:58
7. "Stolen Souls" – 5:00
8. "Screamer" – 6:25
9. "Back to the Cave" – 4:35
10. "Dying Sun" – 1:56

== Personnel ==
- Stéphane Souteryand - vocals, guitars
- François Falempin - guitars
- Geoffrey Gautier - keyboards
- Victorien Vilchez - bass
- Laurent Harrouart - drums
