= Damnation's Prophecy =

Studio album by Abominator
- Released: 29 March 1999
- Recorded: June – July 1998
- Genre: Blackened death metal
- Length: 56:33
- Label: Necropolis Records

Abominator chronology
Damnation's Prophecy (1999)	Subversives for Lucifer (2001)

Damnation's Prophecy is the first full-length studio album by the blackened death metal band Abominator. It was released on Necropolis records in 1999. It was also re-released on Merciless Records, on LP format, in late 1999.

== Track listing ==
1. Intro – Filthy Spirit Antichrist – 3:50
2. Debauchery (The Sinners Hammer) – 4:32
3. Damnation's Prophecy – 5:47
4. Intro – War Worship – 4:27
5. Activate the Anarchus – 5:42
6. The Conqueror Possessed – 5:58
7. Unholy Consecration – 6:25
8. Ode to Morbid Pleasure – 7:21
9. Luciferian Path to Destruction – 6:25
10. Sepulchral Vomit – Outro – 6:06
