= Decade of Decadence (Impaled Nazarene album) =

Compilation album by Impaled Nazarene
- Released: 2000
- Genre: Extreme metal

Professional ratings
Review scores
Source	Rating
Metal Hammer	8/10

Decade of Decadence is a compilation album by Finnish extreme metal band Impaled Nazarene, and it was released in year 2000, declaring band's 10-year career. It features songs from the band's early material.

== Track listing ==
1. "Intro"
2. "Condemned To Hell"
3. "The Crucified"
4. "Disgust Suite O-P I"
5. "Morbid Fate"
6. "Disgust Suite O-P II"
7. "Worms In Rectum"
8. "Conned Thru Life"
9. "Crucifixation"
10. "Nuctemeron Of Necromanteion"
11. "Condemned To Hell"
12. "Impurity Of Dawn"
13. "The Crucified"
14. "Infernus"
15. "Morbid Fate"
16. "Ave Satanas"
17. "In The Name Of Satan"
18. "Fall To Fornication"
19. "Damnation (Raping The Angels)"
20. "Noisrevrep Taog"
21. "In The Name Of Satan"
22. "Noisrevrep Eht Retfa"
23. "Damnation (Raping The Angels)"¨
24. "The Black Vomit"
25. "Ghost Riders"
26. "Sadogoat"
27. "I Am The Killer Of Trolls"
28. "Kill Yourself"
29. "Burst Command 'Til War"
30. "Nuclear Metal Retaliation"
31. "Instrumental I"
32. "Instrumental II"
33. "Instrumental III"
