= Yyrkoon (band) =

French death metal band

- Origin: France
- Genres: Melodic death metal, thrash metal
- Years active: 1995–2007 (indefinite hiatus)
- Labels: Velvet Music International; Anvil Prod; Osmose Productions
- Members: Stéphane Souteyrand; Laurent Harrouart
- Past members: Victorien Vilchez; Geoffrey Gautier; Paul Banas; Sébastien Caron; Jérôme Barouin; Kristofer Laurent; François Falempin; Dirk Verbeuren

Yyrkoon (/jɪərˈkuːn/ yeer-KOON) is a French death metal band. Their lyrics revolve around occultism, horror/fantasy, and philosophy. The name Yyrkoon is derived from Elric of Melniboné's cousin in Michael Moorcock's fantasy series.

== Biography ==
=== Demos, Oniric Transition ===
The band was formed in 1995 by Stéphane Souteyrand (guitar & keyboards), Laurent Harrouart (drums), Paul Banas (vocals & guitar), and Sébastien Caron (bass guitar). One year later, Yyrkoon self-recorded the five-song demo tape Oath, Obscure, Occult…, which included female vocals, violin, and flute. This tape was well received in the underground.

The demo was sent to different French labels. Velvet Music International signed the band. Personal conflicts during the recording of the band's debut album led to lineup changes. Banas and Caron left the band, and Jérôme Barouin on guitar and Kristofer Laurent on bass guitar were recruited. Stéphane Souteyrand switched to vocals and asked Jeff Gautier to play keyboards. The band recorded its first album, Oniric Transition, in 1998 at Walnut Grove Studio in Amiens, France.

After not being contacted with another deal from Velvet Music International, Yyrkoon was forced to find a new label. Another demo, entitled Forgotten Past, was recorded and distributed. During this time, Barouin left the band, which went for 7–8 months without a second guitarist. After a difficult search, François Falempin joined on guitar while Kristofer Laurent was fired and replaced by Victorien Villchez. Yyrkoon began touring with other well-known European bands such as Septic Flesh, Misanthrope, Aborted, Gojira, Scarve, and Mercyless.

=== Dying Sun ===
Following a show in Paris in 2001, Yyrkoon met Stéphane Brulez, manager for the label Anvil Prod, who gave the band a two-album deal. Yyrkoon was the first band signed to Anvil Prod. The band's second album, Dying Sun, was released in 2002 to positive reviews albeit a different, more thrash metal-influenced sound.

=== Occult Medicine ===
In 2003, the band begun composing its third album, during which time Falempin left the band and Gautier took over the guitar position from keyboards. Occult Medicine was recorded in Denmark at Jacob Hansen studios. Before recording, Harrouart lost motivation to continue with the band because of personal problems. Yyrkoon hired Dirk Verbeuren (of Soilwork and Scarve fame) to record the drum tracks.

Occult Medicine was sent to many different labels before its release since Yyrkoon was displeased with Anvil Prod's management job. After a few weeks, Osmose Productions signed the band with a two-record deal that included Occult Medicine, with which the band has been quite pleased.

=== Unhealthy Opera and disbanding ===
The band's fourth album, Unhealthy Opera, was released in 2006 on Osmose. After a year of touring, the band was placed on hiatus in late February 2007 due to Souteryand's lack of motivation and enthusiasm.

== Discography ==
- Oath, Obscure, Occult… (demo, 1996)
- Oniric Transition (1998)
- Forgotten Past (mini CD, 2000)
- Dying Sun (2002)
- Occult Medicine (2004)
- Unhealthy Opera (2006)

== Members ==
=== Current members ===
- Stéphane Souteyrand – guitar, vocals
- Laurent Harrouart – drums

=== Former members ===
- Victorién Vilchez – bass guitar, classical guitar
- Paul Banas – guitar, vocals
- Sébastien Caron – bass guitar
- Jérôme Barouin – guitar (session)
- Kristofer Laurent – bass guitar
- François Falempin – guitar
- Dirk Verbeuren – drums (session)
