= Bestial Mockery =

Swedish black metal band

- Origin: Uddevalla, Sweden
- Genre: Black metal
- Years active: 1995–2008, 2011-2013
- Labels: Agonia; Deathstrike; Hell's Headbangers; Impaler of Trendies; Metal Blood Music; Osmose; Season of Mist; Sombre; Terranis; Time Before Time; Turanian Honour; Warlord; Witchhammer; Witching Metal Reckords
- Members: Master Motorsåg (vocals); Micke Doomanfanger (guitar); Rob DevilPig (bass); Aggressive Protector (guitar); Carl Warslaughter (drums)
- Past members: Ted Bundy (guitar); Sir Torment (bass); Fjant Sodomizer (bass); Anti-Fred-Rik (bass); Jocke Christcrusher (bass)
- Website: Bestial Mockery @ Myspace

Bestial Mockery is a Swedish black metal band formed in Uddevalla in 1995 by Carl "Master Motorsåg" Bildt, Micke "Doomanfanger" Petersson, Jocke "Christcrusher" and Carl "Warslaughter". The band aimed to "channel perverted lusts for Satanic bloody Metal". Before disbanding in 2008, Bestial Mockery released four albums for Metal Blood Music, Osmose and Season of Mist, as well as multiple EPs and split releases with other underground metal acts. In a review of Slaying the Life in Decibel magazine, a similarity between the band and Nunslaughter was noted.

The band reformed in November 11, 2011.

== Line-up ==
=== Last known line-up ===
- Carl "Master Motorsåg" Bildt (vocals)

Rob Devilpig Mastodont Wartones

- Micke "Doomanfanger" Petersson (guitar)
- Aggressive Perfector (guitar)
- Carl Warslaughter (drums)

=== Former line-ups ===
- Ted Bundy (guitar)
- Sir Torment (bass)
- Fjant Sodomizer (bass)
- Anti-Fred-Rik (bass)
- Jocke Christcrusher (bass)
- Rob DevilPig (bass)

== Discography ==
=== Demos ===
- Battle Promo (1996)
- Christcrushing Hammerchainsaw (1997)
- Chainsaw Demons Return (1998)
- War: The Final Solution (2000)
- Sepulchral Wrath (2006)

=== LPs ===
- Christcrushing Hammerchainsaw (Metal Blood Music, 2002; re-released by Hell's Headbangers, 2009)
- Evoke the Desecrator (Osmose, 2003)
- Gospel of the Insane (Osmose, 2006)
- Slaying the Life (Season of Mist, 2007)

=== EPs ===
- Live for Violence, split cassette with Lust (Impaler of Trendies, 1999)
- Nuclear Goat / Joyful Dying, split 7-inch with Suicidal Winds (2000)
- A Sign of Satanic Victory (Warlord, 2002)
- Tribute to I-17, split with Axis Powers (Agonia, 2004)
- Outbreak of Evil, split with Nocturnal, Vomitor and Toxic Holocaust (Witching Metal Reckords, 2004)
- Eve of the Bestial Massacre, split with Unholy Massacre (Deathstrike, 2005; re-released by Agonia, 2006)
- Poison of the Underground, split with Force of Darkness (Turanian Honour, 2007)
- Metal of Death, split with Destruktor (Hell's Headbangers, 2007)
- Hail Occult Masters, split with Karnarium (Hell's Headbangers, 2008)
- Deep Grave Dungeons, split with Crucifier, Throneum and Sathanas (Time Before Time, 2008)

=== Compilations ===
- Chainsaw Execution (Sombre, 2001)
- The Unholy Trinity (Witchhammer, 2007)
- Chainsaw Destruction (12 Years on the Bottom of a Bottle) (Terranis, 2007)
