= Pro Patria Finlandia =

Studio album by Impaled Nazarene
- Released: 2006
- Genre: Black metal
- Length: 38:11
- Label: Osmose Productions
- Producer: Tapio Pennanen, Impaled Nazarene

Impaled Nazarene chronology
Death Comes In 26 Carefully Selected Pieces (2005)	Pro Patria Finlandia (2006)	Manifest (2007)

Pro Patria Finlandia is Impaled Nazarene's ninth full-length studio album. It was released on Osmose Productions in 2006.

== Track listing ==
All songs written and arranged by Impaled Nazarene.

1. Weapons to Tame a Land – 3:53
2. Something Sinister – 2:53
3. Goat Sodomy – 2:22
4. Neighbouricide – 3:39
5. One Dead Nation Under Dead God – 3:48
6. For Those Who Have Fallen – 3:43
7. Leucorrhea – 0:43
8. Kut – 2:47
9. This Castrated World – 3:16
10. Psykosis – 3:15
11. Contempt – 1:37
12. I Wage War – 2:11
13. Cancer – 0:56
14. Hate-Despise-Arrogance – 3:04

== Personnel ==
- Mika Luttinen (Sluti666) – vocals
- Tuomio Louhio – lead guitar
- Jarno Anttila (Onraj 9mm) – rhythm guitar
- Mikael Arnkil (Arc V 666) – bass
- Reima Kellokoski (Repe Misanthrope) – drums

=== Production ===
- Tapio Pennanen – production, recording, engineering, mixing
- Impaled Nazarene – production
- Mika Jussila – mastering
