= Sabbat (Japanese band) =

Japanese metal band

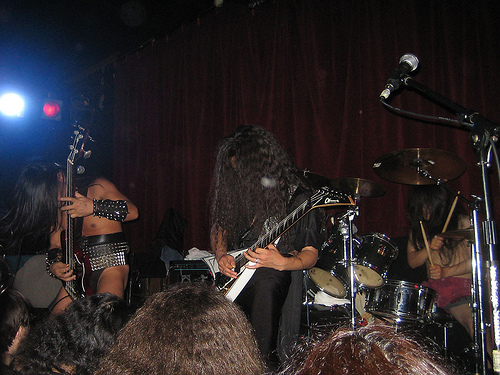
- Sabbat performing in New York, 2005

Background information
- Origin: Kuwana, Japan
- Genres: Thrash metal; black metal
- Years active: 1983–present
- Labels: Evil, Heavy Metal Super Star
- Members: Gezol; Zorugelion; Ginoir
- Website: isten.net/sabbat

Sabbat (サバト, Sabato) is a Japanese black/thrash metal band formed in the early 1980s. On some releases, they showcase a traditional metal sound.

== History ==
Sabbat started in 1983 when bassist Gezol, guitarists Ozny and Elizaveat, drummer Valvin, and vocalist Toshiya formed the band Evil. Except Ozny, they had played together since 1981 in high school bands like Aburamushi, Hot Rod and Black Beast. Those bands played mostly covers of new wave of British heavy metal acts like Iron Maiden and Demon. Evil started to write original material. They played their first show in August 1983.

In early 1984, Toshiya left and Gezol took over vocals. During the summer, the four members made the band their priority and changed its name to Sabbat. In autumn, Sabbat began performing, often covering Venom songs, in and around Kuwana.

In April 1985, Sabbat recorded two songs for their first single. Gezol's label, Evil Records, released 300 copies of the single. In June, Gezol's brother Samm (a.k.a. Gero) replaced Valvin on drums.

In 1986, Sabbat played throughout Japan, resulting in an appearance at Under The Castle festival on August 3, broadcast on television. Less than two weeks later, they played the second night of a two-night show in Tokyo without Ozny, who had assaulted a concertgoer after the first night's show. Two weeks later, Ozny played his last show with Sabbat. The band continued as a trio.

In June 1987, Sabbat recorded their second 7", Born by Evil Blood. Evil Records released it. Because of a family death in August, Gezol and Samm stopped playing live. They performed their farewell show in Nagoya on September 13. Forty-three people attended.

In early 1988, Evil Records released the third 7" record, Desecration. The Devil's Sperm Is Cold followed a year later.

With these 7" singles and EPs, Sabbat gained popularity outside Japan. In early 1989, Gezol wanted to return, but Elizaveat disagreed and Samm had joined Sacrifice. Nonetheless, Sabbat played a show in May with a one-night-only line-up of Gezol (bass guitar), Barraveat (guitar), Zorugelion (drums) and Possessed Hammer (vocals). Gezol persuaded Elizaveat to play live with Sabbat one more time, and they played an official reunion show on October 10 with Gezol (bass guitar/vocals), Elizaveat (guitar) and Zorugelion (drums).

Zorugelion was an official member, replacing Samm permanently on drums. The agreement with Elizaveat was for one show only, so Sabbat had to find a new guitar player.

Sabbat did not play a single show in 1990, though they released a fifth 7" record on Evil Records. The Seven Deadly Sins EP consisted of three songs with Samm still on drums. Although unwilling to play live, Elizaveat helped Sabbat in the studio until they found a new guitar player. Sabbat recorded the demo tape Sabbatical Demon, Zorugelion's first studio recording with the band and Sabbat's only official demo.

The two shows in 1989 were the only shows Sabbat had played during the previous three years. Without a new guitarist, Sabbat returned to the studio in October 1990. The trio started to record Sabbat's debut full-length album, Envenom, with Elizaveat on guitar. The band recruited guitarist Temis Osmond.

Osmond played a couple of solos on Envenom as a special guest. He had replaced Elizaveat permanently by the time the CD came out in 1991 on Evil Records. The new line-up consisted of Gezol (bass/vocals), Osmond (guitar/vocals) and Zorugelion (drums).

In September 1991, Sabbat flew to Europe to promote the band and make contacts. A planned show in Germany did not happen. There were plans for Austrian label Lethal Records to release Envenom in Europe, but this did not happen either.

In early 1992, they recorded their second album. Osmond played all guitars and shared lead vocals with Gezol. Zorugelion provided some vocals for the album as well. Evil Records released Evoke in the summer of 1992.

In December 1992, Sabbat recorded their third album. Underground metal magazine F.E.T.U. devoted its 13th issue to interviews, pictures, and detailed information about Sabbat. Evil Records released third album Disembody in early 1993. In the autumn, Sabbat returned to the studio.

A special 10th-anniversary album consisting of re-recorded versions of old songs was recorded in autumn 1993. Before this album was released in early 1994, Sabbat recorded fourth album Fetishism, which Evil Records released. After Fetishism, they released the first part of the anniversary album, Black Up Your Soul, featuring special guest Elizaveat. Samm on drums and Ozny on guitar joined the band during a special live show in Nagoya on June 6.

In the autumn of 1994, Holycaust Records released the MCD Sabbatical Devilucifer, consisting of unreleased demo recordings. The following year, Italian label Entropy Records re-released Envenom for the European market.

== Members ==
=== Current members ===
- Gezol – lead vocals, bass (1984–present)
- Zorugelion – drums, backing vocals (1990–present)
- Ginoir – guitars, backing vocals (2021–present)

=== Former members ===
- Samm a.k.a. Gero – drums, backing vocals (1985–1990)
- Ozny – guitars, backing vocals (1984–1986)
- Valvin – drums, backing vocals (1984–1985)
- Elizaveat – guitars, backing vocals (1984–1991)
- Temis Osmond – guitars, keyboards, backing vocals (1991–2005)
- Damiazell – guitars, backing vocals (2007–2015)
- Elizabigore – guitars, backing vocals (2016–2021)

== Discography ==
=== Studio albums ===
- Envenom (Evil Records, Japan 1991)
- Evoke (Evil Records, Japan 1992)
- Disembody (Evil Records, Japan 1993)
- Fetishism (Evil Records, Japan 1994)
- The Dwelling (Evil Records, Japan 1996)
- Karisma (Iron Pegasus Records, Germany 1999)
- Satanasword (Iron Pegasus Records, Germany 2000)
- Karmagmassacre (Iron Pegasus Records, Germany 2003)
- Sabbatrinity (Iron Pegasus Records, Germany 2011)
- Sabbaticult (Iron Pegasus Records, Germany 2024)

=== Live albums ===
- Live at Blokula (Evil Records, Japan 1995)
- Live 666 – Japanese Harmageddon (Evil Records, Japan 1996)
- Live Curse (Heavy Metal Super Star Records, Japan 1999)
- Live Kindergarten (Heavy Metal Super Star Records, Japan 1999)
- Live Devil (Heavy Metal Super Star Records, Japan 2000)
- Live Panica (Heavy Metal Super Star Records, Japan 2000)
- Iberian Harmageddon (Hibernia Productions, Portugal 2000)
- Live Revenge (Heavy Metal Super Star Records, Japan 2000)
- Russian Harmageddon (Satanic Assault Productions, Brazil 2000)
- Live Meltdown (Heavy Metal Super Star Records, Japan 2001)
- Live Nuts (Heavy Metal Super Star Records, Japan 2001)
- Live Festa (Heavy Metal Super Star Records, Japan 2001)
- Dietsland Harmageddon (Berzerker Records, Holland 2001)
- Minami-Kyushu Harmageddon (Infernal Tharsh Records, Japan 2001)
- Live Torture (Heavy Metal Super Star Records, Japan 2001)
- Live Guanafight (Heavy Metal Super Star Records, Japan 2002)
- Live Lovefire (Heavy Metal Super Star Records, Japan 2002)
- Live Batan-Q (Heavy Metal Super Star Records, Japan 2002)
- Live Izumoden (Heavy Metal Super Star Records, Japan 2003)
- Gezonslaught (Ososo Records, Japan 2003)
- Valvinonslaught (Infernal Thrash Records, Japan 2003)
- Elizaveatonslaught (Heavy Metal Super Star Records, Japan 2003)
- Naniwa Tepoddonslaught (Evil Dead Records, Japan 2003)
- Live Hamagurism (Heavy Metal Super Star Records, Japan 2003)
- Hamaguri Resurrection (Assaulter Productions, United States 2004)
- Live Undertakers (Temis Osmond) (Heavy Metal Super Star Records, Japan 2004)
- Live Resurrection (Monster Nation / Iron Tyrant, Sweden / Italy 2004)
- Live Undertakers (Zorugelion) (Heavy Metal Super Star Records, Japan 2004)
- Live Sabbatical Hamaguri Queen (Nuclear War Now! Productions, United States 2005)
- Satanas Francisconslaught (Bay Area Sabbatical Maniacs Records, United States 2005)
- Brooklyn Blackfire (Heavy Metal Super Star, Japan 2005)
- Geionslaught 1986 (Time Before Time, Poland 2006)
- Tribute to Temis (Heavy Metal Super Star, Japan 2006)
- Sabbademonical Liveslaught (Stygian Shadows Productions, Hungary 2007)
- Go Gezol Go! (Heavy Metal Super Star, Japan 2007)
- Live in BKK (Heavy Metal Super Star, Japan 2007)
- Live in Singapore (Heavy Metal Super Star, Japan 2007)
- Hamaguri Hihoukan (Ososo Records, Japan 2007)
- Go Gezol Go! (Heavy Metal Super Star Records, Japan 2007)
- Ishidamien Infects Inferno (Heavy Metal Super Star Records, Japan 2007)
- Xenophobiac Xanthous Xenogenesis (Heavy Metal Super Star Records, Japan 2007)
- Hamaguri Hihoukan (Ososo Records, Japan 2007)
- Live in Singapore (Heavy Metal Super Star Records, Japan 2007)
- Live Resurrection (Iron Tyrant, Italy 2007)
- Live in San Francisconslaught (Assaulter Productions / Depths of Hell Records, USA 2008)
- Feel Finnish Fire (Heavy Metal Super Star Records, Japan 2008)
- Sabbatical Milanonslaught (Iron Tyrant, Italy 2008)
- Uda's Ultimate Unison (Heavy Metal Super Star Records, Japan 2008)
- Psychedelic Pounding Pain (Heavy Metal Super Star Records, Japan 2008)
- Kill Fuck Jesus Christ (Anti-Goth 262, US 2013)

=== Singles/EPs ===
- Sabbat (Evil Records, Japan 1985)
- Born by Evil Blood (Evil Records, Japan 1987)
- Desecration (Evil Records, Japan 1988)
- The Devil's Sperm Is Cold (Evil Records, Japan 1989)
- The Seven Deadly Sins (Evil Records, Japan 1990)
- European Harmageddon (Merciless Records, Germany 1997)
- Scandinavian Harmageddon (Primitive Art Productions, Sweden 1997)
- East European Harmageddon (View Beyond Records, Czech Republic 1998)
- American Harmageddon (Holycaust Records, United States 1998)
- Asian Halmageddon (Evil Records, China 1998)
- African Harmageddon (Mganga Records, Tanzania 1998)
- Oceanic Harmageddon (Way of Life Records, Australia 1999)
- South American Harmageddon (Mega Therion Records / Sylphorium Records, Brasil / Colombia 1999)
- Sabbatical Demonslaught (View Beyond Records, Czech Republic 1999
- Baltic Harmageddon (Sadistic Sodomizer, Latvia 2000)
- French Harmageddon (End All Life Productions, France 2000)
- Brazilian Demonslaught (Live Recordings Attack, Brazil 2002)
- Demonslaught Sverige (Monster Nation, Sweden 2003)
- Naniwa Harmageddon (Ososo Records, Japan 2003)
- Zorugelionslaught (Infernal Thrash Records, Japan 2003)
- Temis Osmonslaught (Infernal Thrash Records, Japan 2004)
- Gezonslaught (Infernal Thrash Records, Japan 2004)
- Fetus Tribute (Holycaust Records, United States 2004)
- Sabbatical Rehearsalucifer (Time Before Time, Poland 2004)
- Icelandic & Greenlandic Demonslaught (View Beyond, Czech Republic 2006)
- Finnish Demonslaught (Metal Warning, Finland 2008)

=== Compilation albums ===
- Black up Your Soul... (Evil Records, Japan 1994)
- Sabbatical Devilucifer (Holycaust Records, United States 1994)
- ...for Satan and Sacrifice (Evil Records, Japan 1995)
- Bloody Countess (Holycaust Records, United States 1996)
- Sabbatical Rites (Iron Pegasus Records, Germany 1999)
- VenoMetal (Sons of Satan, Brazil 2000)
- Live Wacko (Heavy Metal Super Star, Japan 2003)
- Brigitte Harmageddon (Brigittefan Records, Australia 2003)
- Sabbatical Satanachrist Slaughter – Bay Area Harmageddon (Nuclear War Now! Productions, United States 2003)
- Sabbat (Asian Hordes, Philippines 2004)
- Envenometal (Heavy Metal Super Star Records, Japan 2004)
- Sabbatical Holocaust (Time Before Time Records, Poland 2004)
- ...And the Sabbatical Queen (RIP Records, United States 2004)
- Mion's Hill – 20th Anniversary Special Release 1984–2004 (Iron Pegasus Records, Germany 2004)
- ...To Praise the Sabbatical Queen (Iron Pegasus Records, Germany 2004)
- Sabbatical 25 Years Kamikaze Demonslaught (Deathbringer Records, Germany 2008)
- The Harmageddon Vinylucifer Singles (Iron Pegasus Records, Germany 2008)
- Polish Demonslaught (Hard Rocker Magazine, Poland 2008)

=== Split releases ===
- Far East Gate in Inferno (Evil Records, Japan 1994)
- Headbangers Against Disco with Gehennah, Infernö and Bestial Warlust (Primitive Art Productions, Sweden 1997)
- Thrashing Holocaust (Necropolis Records, United States 1999)
- The Bulldozer Armageddon Volume 1 with Imperial (Warlord Records, Italy 2000)
- Sabbatical Splitombstone with Unpure (Iron Pegasus Records, Germany 2001)
- The Return of Darkness and Hate (Drakkar Productions, France 2001)
- Antarctic Harmageddon (Heavy Metal Super Star Records, Japan 2001)
- Split with Gorgon (View Beyond, Czech Republic 2001)
- Split with Unholy Grave (The Sky Is Red Records, United States 2001)
- Split with Terror Squad (Legions of Death Records, France 2001)
- Kamikaze Splitting Roar with Abigail (From Beyond Productions, Holland 2004)
- Live Vanguard with Ground Zero (Heavy Metal Super Star Records, Japan 2004)
- Live Undertakers (Gezol) with Zombie Ritual (Heavy Metal Super Star Records, Japan 2004)
- Tokyo Genocidemonslaught with Asbestos (Metal Crusade Productions, Japan 2005)
- Sabbatical Desaterminator with Desaster (Witchhammer Productions, Thailand 2005)
- Split with Forever Winter (Holycaust, United States 2005)
- Sabbatical Gorgonslaught with Gorgon (Witchhammer, Thailand 2005)
- Sabbatical Siamesechristbeheading with Surrender of Divinity (Witchhammer, Thailand 2006)
- Bloodlust Regime 1942 – The Syonan-To Massacres... with Iron Fist (Necromancer Records, Germany 2006)
- Sabbatical Goat Semen with Goat Semen (Witchhammer, Thailand 2006)
- Split with Metalucifer (Dream Evil Records, Italy 2008)
- Sexualuciferian with Sexual Perverts (Colombia, 2015)
