= Impaled Nazarene =

Finnish extreme metal band

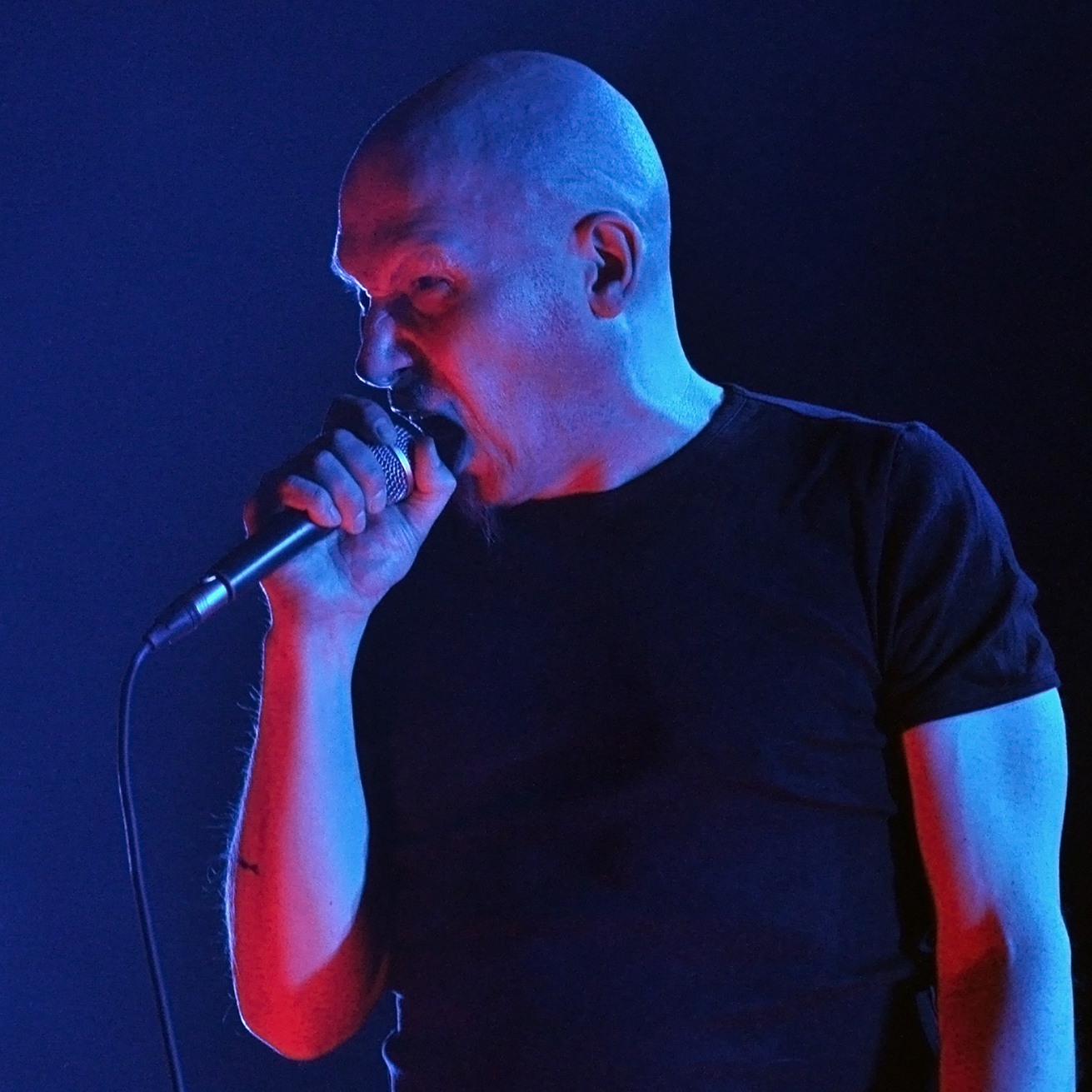

Background information
- Also known as: Johannes Joseph Swampzig
- Origin: Oulu, Finland
- Genres: Black metal; blackened thrash metal; crust punk; grindcore
- Years active: 1990–present
- Label: Osmose Productions
- Members: Mika Luttinen; Reima Kellokoski; Mikael Arnkil; Kimmo Korhonen
- Past members: Kimmo "Sir" Luttinen; Tomi "UG" Ullgren; Ari Holappa; Mika Pääkkö; Harri Halonen; Jarno Anttila; Taneli Jarva; Marko Hietala; Jani Lehtosaari; Alexi Laiho; Teemu Raimoranta; Tuomo "Tuomio" Louhio; Kim Lappalainen

Impaled Nazarene is a Finnish extreme metal band that started as black metal but has incorporated grindcore, thrash metal and death metal, and grown towards hardcore punk.

== History ==
The band formed in November 1990, with Mika Luttinen, Kimmo Luttinen, Mika Pääkkö, Ari Holappa and Antti Pihkala. Their debut album, Tol Cormpt Norz Norz Norz, entered the Finnish charts.

The band was infamous for their apparent hatred of the Norwegian black metal scene in the early 1990s. The band seems to have disassociated themselves from that dislike. Luttinen later claimed, "We have absolutely nothing against Norwegians. I even made up with Euronymous before he was killed so just forget this thing, it is ancient history".

Impaled Nazarene stopped wearing corpse paint in the mid-1990s. Luttinen explained that "we felt it was time distance ourselves a bit from the ridiculous ideas and statements that were circulating around the whole scene back then. And look around, we are not alone who have done this. Even Norwegian bands have dropped paint and other shit and are concentrating on the music instead of childish statements".

With Suomi Finland Perkele, Impaled Nazarene became less aggressive, but this direction ended with Kimmo Luttinen's removal from the line-up. Mika Luttinen explained his dissatisfaction and how the band changed under his brother's guidance,

The bottom line is that Kimmo [Luttinen - Mika's brother and the band's former drummer] changed our style pretty much after the release of Ugra-Karma. It was his vision of how we should sound, and the rest of us weren't happy at all. It is useless for a band like us to try to be a copy of Danzig or fucking Paradise Lost. So, after Kimmo was replaced, it was normal for us to go back to what we do best, i.e. play aggressive and fast metal [...] It was one guy who wanted to go a different way, and the rest did not agree. Nobody expected such a release as Latex Cult from us anymore, but we fucking proved that we are still here, doing our thing our way. We can get only nastier.

After growing unpolished in delivery, the band shifted with Nihil (2000) and the accession of Children of Bodom guitarist Alexi Laiho, towards "a benzedrine-fueled combination of thrash metal and Iron Maiden". Luttinen explained that Laiho's role was critical: "it was clear that now that we had finally two guitar players that we kind of like wanted to get away from that punky kind of writing style and started just wanting to get more back to the metal feeling".

Their ninth studio album, Pro Patria Finlandia, was a popular Japanese import. Impaled Nazarene have toured with bands including Cannibal Corpse, Mayhem and Dark Tranquility, traversing four continents and over thirty countries.

On 16 March 2003, guitarist Teemu Raimoranta fell to his death off a bridge and onto the ice below, in "an alcohol-related accidental fall".

On 15 January 2022, the band announced that after almost 15 years, Tomi Ullgrén had left the band, citing busy work schedules that interfere with the band's rehearsal schedule.

== Lyrical content ==
For most of their history, Impaled Nazarene has focused on Finnish nationalism (for instance, "Total War - Winter War" is about the Soviet-Finnish war in 1939 and 1940), and have demonstrated an anti-communist bent, as exemplified in "Healers of the Red Plague" on Rapture. Other lyrics revolve around war and Satanism. When asked about the hints of humour in their lyrics, Luttinen affirmed that this was limited to Suomi Finland Perkele: "There will be no humour, we are not some fucking joke. If people find my lyrics funny, then, well, something is most certainly wrong in their heads". The band has included at least one song on every album with the word "goat" in the title, which Luttinen considers a "trademark" of the band:

Our very first EP was called Goat Perversion. And then it continued [...] actually on our website, I asked the question, "Do you want us to continue having the goat songs, yes or no?" and everybody else except one guy said "Yes, continue with the goat song. We want goat songs". So I said "Okay, you want goat songs, and so goat songs you shall get!" The thing is that when you are doing a goat song, the song is called "Goat Sodomy", you can be sure that it's not going to be deep social commentary of our problems. The goat songs will have Satan, the goat songs with have goats, the goat songs will have bleeding rectums, they will have blood, shit, all things that we all love and like.

Impaled Nazarene's Nihil (2000) is their only banned album. This has caused problems for the band as, according to Luttinen, "Somebody seem to have really something against us and unfortunately that somebody has power enough to get our shows cancelled". Luttinen criticized the performance bans that the band has suffered in Germany and Poland, which he made explicit in the lyrics for Manifest (2007). About the lack of sexual themes on Manifest, Luttinen said,

There was no need to write about pussies or fucking. There was a need to point out certain things to braindead Germans. History repeats itself in Germany right now and where shall all this end? We are supposed to have same common laws inside [the] European Union but at the same time countries like Germany or Poland can do whatever they want to. It makes no sense to us.

In June 2017, hardcore festival Ieperfest in Ypres (Ieper), Belgium, removed Impaled Nazarene from the line up after threats of violence from protesters. The reason for the protest was the band's lyrics condoning homophobia and rape. The festival organizers issued the following statement:

Dear music lovers, After a firm debate - that's what you do in a democracy - the organization decided to cancel Finnish band IMPALED NAZARENE (in mutual consent). Otherwise we can no longer guarantee everyone's safety at our beloved festival. [...] Ieperfest consists entirely out of volunteers. People with boundless love for music, but also full-time jobs, families and children. Threatening the personal integrity of our volunteers and visitors in today's context of attacks and raging violence... some of you should think twice!

In November 2024, there was a stir about the Eindhoven pop venue Effenaar in the Netherlands, after it had booked the band for the Eindhoven Metal Meeting on 13 and 14 December. A petition 'no far-right bands in the Effenaar', in which the arrival of Impaled Nazarene was strongly condemned, was signed more than a thousand times.

== Members ==
Current line-up

- Mika Luttinen - vocals (1990–present)
- Reima Kellokoski - drums (1995–present)
- Mikael "Arkki" Arnkil - bass (2000–present)
- Kimmo Korhonen - guitar (2025–present)

Former members

- Kimmo "Sir" Luttinen – drums (1990–1995), guitar (1992–1995)
- Antti Pihkala - bass (1990–1991)
- Ari Holappa – guitar (1990–1992)
- Mika Pääkkö – guitar (1990–1992)
- Harri Halonen – bass (1991–1992)
- Jarno Anttila – guitar (1992–2010)
- Taneli Jarva – bass (1992–1996)
- Jani Lehtosaari – bass (1996–2000)
- Alexi Laiho – guitar (1998–2000; died 2020)
- Teemu Raimoranta – guitar (2000–2003; died 2003)
- Tuomo "Tuomio" Louhio – guitar (2003–2007)
- Tomi "UG" Ullgrén - guitar (2007–2022)
- Kim Lappalainen - guitar (2022–2024)

== Discography ==
=== Albums ===
Studio albums

- Tol Cormpt Norz Norz Norz… (1993)
- Ugra-Karma (1993)
- Suomi Finland Perkele (1994)
- Latex Cult (1996)
- Rapture (1998)
- Nihil (2000)
- Absence of War Does Not Mean Peace (2001)
- All That You Fear (2003)
- Pro Patria Finlandia (2006)
- Manifest (2007)
- Road to the Octagon (2010)
- Vigorous and Liberating Death (2014)
- Eight Headed Serpent (2021)

Live albums

- Death Comes in 26 Carefully Selected Pieces (2005)

Compilation albums

- Decade of Decadence (2000)

Split albums

- Impaled Nazarene/Driller Killer (2000)

=== EPs ===
- Goat Perversion (1992)
- Enlightenment Process (2010)
- Die in Holland (2013)
- Morbid Fate (2017)
- Goat of Mendes (2021)

=== Demos ===
- Shemhamforash (1991)
- Taog Eht Fo Htao Eht (1991)
- Tol Cormpt Norz Norz Norz... (1992)

=== Singles ===
- Sadogoat (1992)
- Satanic Masowhore (1993)
- Motörpenis (1996)

=== DVDs ===
- 1990–2012
