= Desaster =

German black/thrash metal band

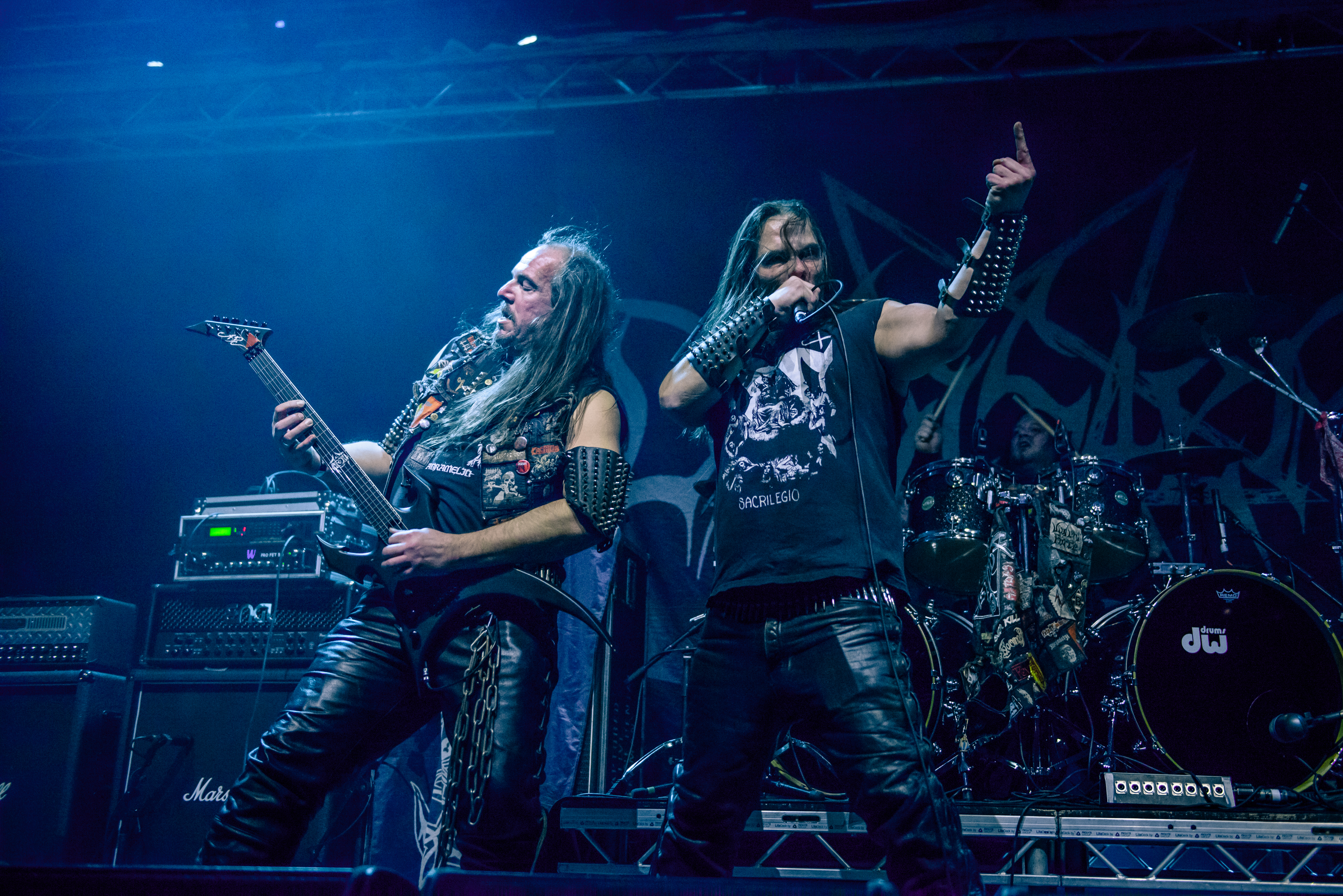
- Desaster performing in 2016

Background information
- Origin: Koblenz, Germany
- Genres: Black metal, thrash metal
- Years active: 1988–1990, 1992–present
- Labels: Merciless Records; Metal Blade Records; Iron PegasusInquisitor; Menhir
- Members: Infernal; Odin; Sataniac; Hont
- Past members: Okkulto; Creator Cassie; Thorim; Luggi; Alexander Arz; Tormentor

Desaster are a German black/thrash metal band formed in Koblenz in 1988. Their lyrics involve war, hate and Satanism.

In 2025, Graham Hartmann of Metal Injection included the album Tyrants of the Netherworld in his list of "10 Extremely Underrated Metal Albums From The 2000s".

== History ==
Desaster formed in 1988. The band had line-up issues before Infernal, the only remaining original member, found musicians to continue Desaster in 1990. Okkulto and Odin joined the band in 1992.

After the demos The Fog of Avalon and Lost in the Ages (which Alexander von Meilenwald of Nagelfar and The Ruins of Beverast considered to be one of the five most important recordings for the German scene), Merciless Records released a split-7" with Ungod in 1995, the band's vinyl-debut. In 1996, the first album, A Touch of Medieval Darkness, was released. The line-up for their following release, the 1997 Stormbringer mini-album, included drummer Tormentor.

In 1998, the band released the limited Ride on for Revenge picture-single. One of the songs was also released on the Thrashing Holocaust compilation CD released via Necropolis Records in 1999. Hellfire's Dominion, the second album, was released in 1998, including the song "Metalized Blood" with guest vocals from Wannes of Pentacle, Lemmy of German speed metal band Violent Force, and Toto of Living Death. By the time it was released, Rock Hard journalist Wolf-Rüdiger Mühlmann considered Desaster the most important German underground black metal band. Götz Kühnemund later called them "Germany's leading black thrashers". During recording sessions for the second album, Desaster recorded the song "Proselytism Real" for the Sodom tribute CD Homage to the Gods, released as a bonus CD of the Code Red album's limited edition.

The band celebrated their 10th anniversary in late 1999 with the Ten Years of Total Desaster double LP. In 2000, they released a split 10-inch with Dutch band Pentacle via Iron Pegasus Records, and their third full-length album, Tyrants of the Netherworld, which featured Beliar from Mayhemic Truth as a guest musician.

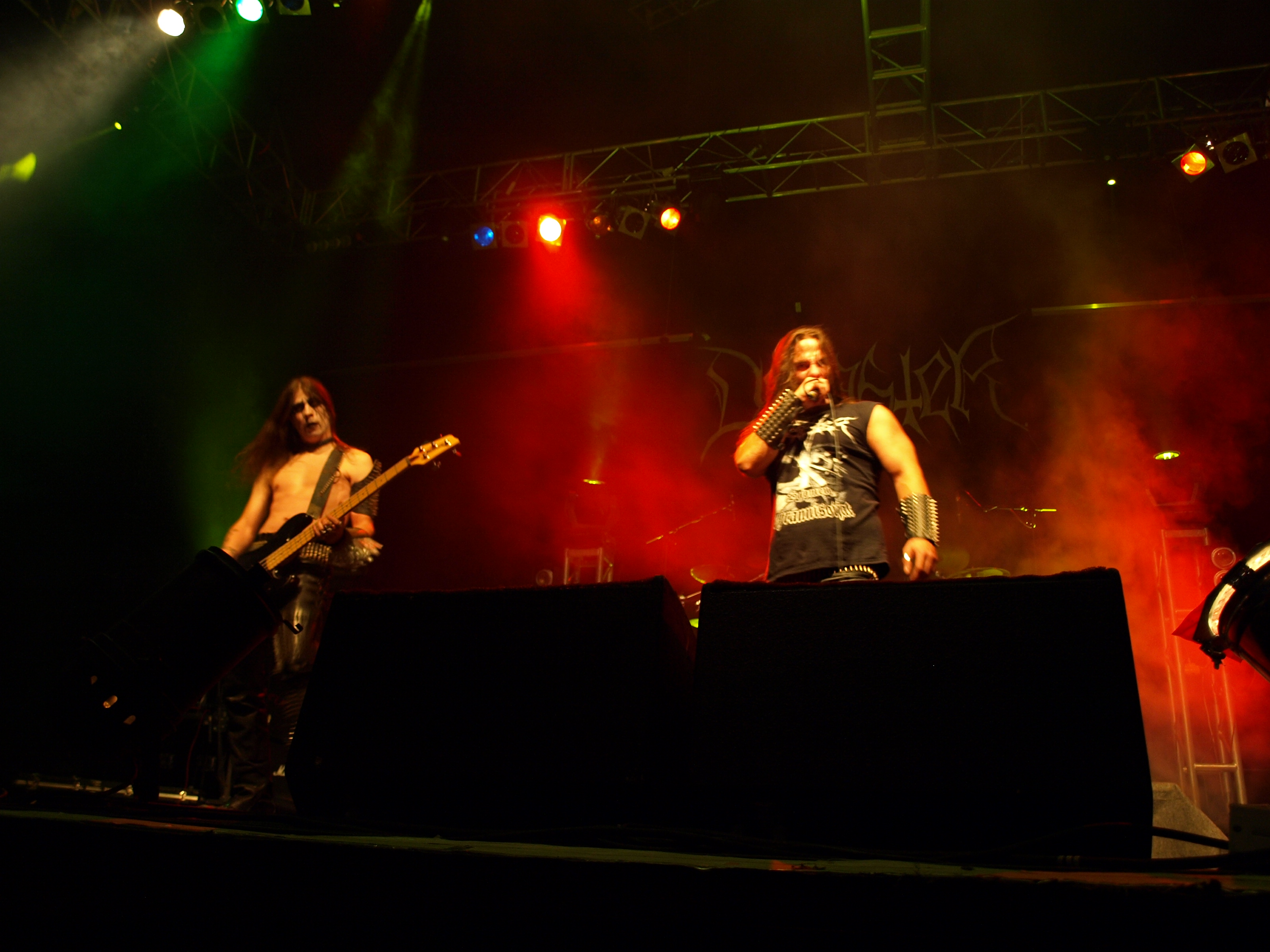
Desaster in 2008

In summer 2001, Desaster contributed the song "Darkness and Evil" with Sabbat vocalist Gezol on guest vocals for a Brazilian Sabbat tribute LP. After the band had played several festivals (e.g., Fuck the Commerce and Wacken Open Air), vocalist Okkulto left the band and was replaced with Sataniac, former vocalist of German black/thrash band Divine Genocide. The Souls of Infernity 7-inch (2001) was Okkulto's last release with Desaster. Divine Blasphemies, featuring the Divine Genocide cover song "Necrolord" and Kreator singer Mille Petrozza as a guest vocalist on "Nighthawk", was released in 2002. A show in São Paulo, Brazil, in front of 900 spectators was considered "a special highlight of 2003" by the band. A recording of the show was released as a double LP/CD and DVD on Brazilian label Mutilation Records. The band moved to Metal Blade Records and released their fifth album, Angelwhore, in 2005, also released on vinyl via Iron Pegasus Records.

After performances in Germany, England, Finland, Ireland, Sweden, the Netherlands, Switzerland and other countries, a mini-tour through Croatia, Serbia, Hungary, Austria and Slovenia and the South American Tour through Brazil, Peru and Colombia, the band released the 12-inch vinyl single Infernal Voices with one new song, the re-recorded "Fields of Triumph", and a cover version of Unleashed's "Before the creation of time".

In May 2007, Desaster entered Harrows Studio, Holland (Asphyx, Pentacle, Occult, Soulburn etc.) to record the sixth studio album, Satan's Soldiers Syndicate. It features guest appearances by Proscriptor (Absu), A.A. Nemtheanga (Primordial) and Ashmedi (Melechesh).

== Musical style ==
When Desaster formed, they were inspired by bands like Venom, Hellhammer and Destruction; the name of the band comes from the Destruction song "Total Desaster". They describe their song "Metalized Blood" as a "neck breaking Speed Metal hymn" and their typical style as "thrashing, blacking riff metal without mercy where there is no space for any innovation and modern elements! It's what Desaster is all about: 'A FIST IN YOUR FACE METAL ATTACK'!" Kühnemund described them as "raw, dirty, honest, heavy and punchy". Desaster's style is closer to traditional thrash metal than to the Norwegian black metal style; although they are often referred to as a black metal band, Frank Stöver considers them a pure thrash metal band whose style, strongly influenced by the old German thrash metal, still sounds "refreshing and honest", unlike many other bands that had black metal roots and then started to play thrash metal. Robert Pöpperl-Berenda described songs like "Victim of My Force", "Tyrants of the Netherworld" and "Call on the Beast" as "primordial Teutonic thrash" and "Nekropolis Karthago" as "black metallic rage". With Sataniac's vocals, Desaster sound "still a bit harder and more uncompromising".

== Members ==
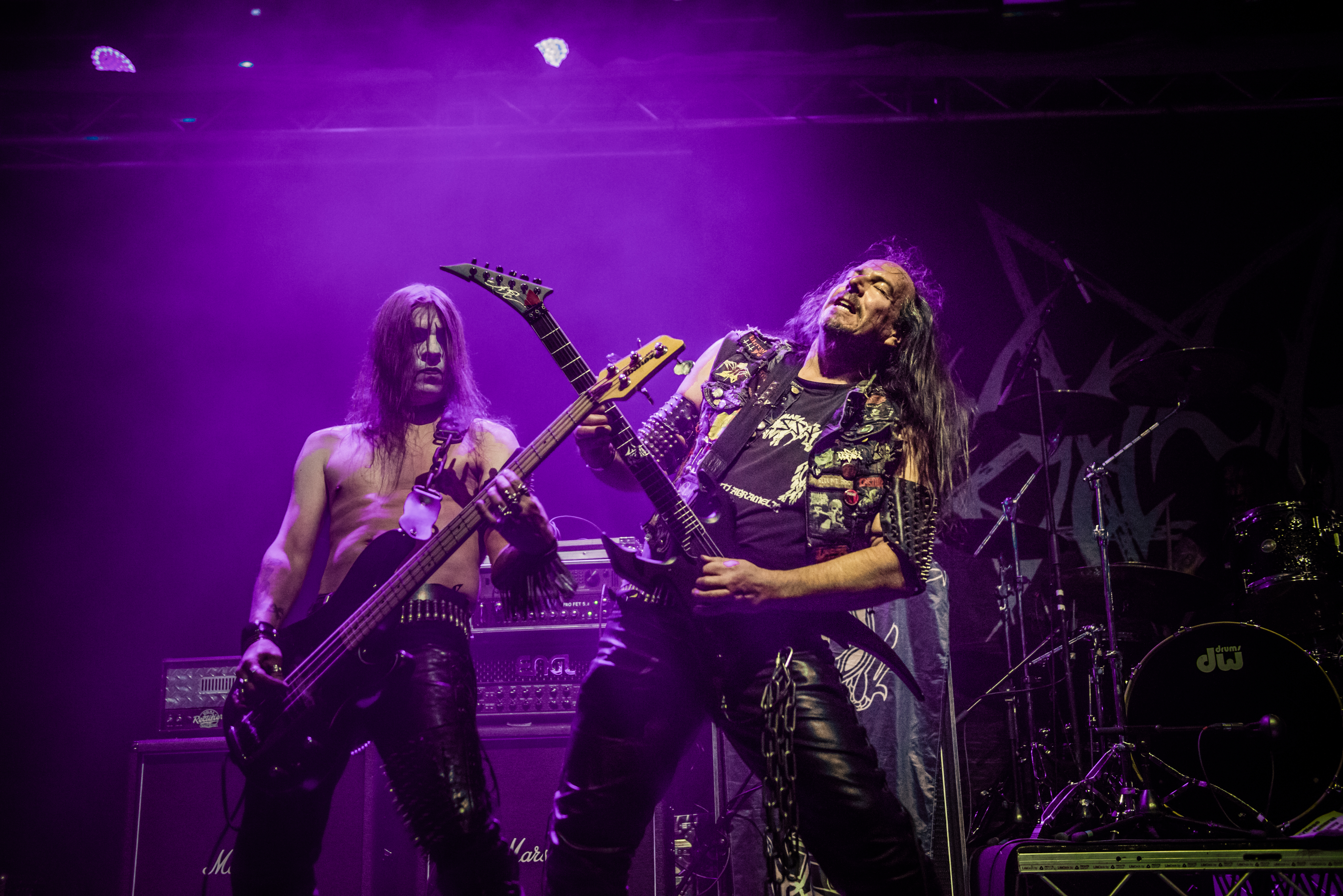
Desaster performing in 2016

=== Current lineup ===
- Infernal – guitars (1988–1990, 1992–present)
- Odin – bass (1992–present)
- Guido "Sataniac" Wissmann – vocals (2001–present)
- Hont – drums (2018–present)

=== Former members ===
- Creator Cassie – vocals, bass (1988–1990)
- Alexander Arz – drums (1988–1990)
- Okkulto – vocals (1992–2001)
- Luggi – drums (1992–1995)
- Tobias "Thorim" Moelich – drums (1995–1996)
- Tormentor – drums (1996–2018)

== Discography ==
- The Fog of Avalon Kaizerslawten (demo, 1993)
- Lost in the Ages (demo, 1994)
- Ungod / Desaster (split with Ungod, 1995)
- A Touch of Medieval Darkness (1996)
- Stormbringer (EP, 1997)
- Ride on for Revenge (single, 1998)
- Hellfire's Dominion (1998)
- "Proselytism Real" on Code Red (1999)
- Ten Years of Total Desaster (Best of/Compilation, 1999)
- Desaster in League with Pentacle (split with Pentacle, 2000)
- Tyrants of the Netherworld (2000)
- Souls of Infernity (EP, 2001)
- Divine Blasphemies (2002)
- Live in Serbian Hell (live album, 2003)
- Brazilian Blitzkrieg Blasphemies (live album, 2004)
- Angelwhore (2005)
- Invaders of Wrath (split with Ironfist, 2005)
- Sabbatical Desasterminator (split with Sabbat, 2005)
- Infernal Voices (EP, 2006)
- Satan's Soldiers Syndicate (2007)
- 20 Years of Total Desaster (boxed set, 2009)
- Anniversarius (split with Sabbat, 2009)
- Zombie Ritual / Devil's Sword (EP, 2010)
- The Arts of Destruction (2012)
- The Oath of an Iron Ritual (2016)
- Churches Without Saints (2021)
- Kill All Idols (2025)
