= Worshippers of the Seventh Tyranny =

Studio album by Impiety
- Released: January 24, 2011
- Recorded: October, 2010 at Music City Studios, Italy
- Genre: Death metal, thrash metal, black metal, doom metal
- Length: 38:32
- Label: Agonia Records
- Producer: Shyaithan

Impiety chronology
Terroreign (Apocalyptic Armageddon Command) (2009)	Worshippers of the Seventh Tyranny (2011)	Ravage and Conquer (2012)

Worshippers of the Seventh Tyranny is the seventh full-length album by Singaporean extreme metal band Impiety, released in 2011 through Agonia Records. It features Fabio Zperandio of Ophiolatry as guest on all lead guitars. It is the first Impiety album to consist of a single, 38-minute-long track. The song employs doom metal approach as opposed to the band previous releases that focused on speed and brutality.

The album is released on several formats, including regular jewel case, digipak and vinyl. Earlier pressings come with a t-shirt while limited edition LP is pressed on marble vinyl, which is limited to 100 copies. Another 566 copies are available as dark maroon finish. Also, some version comes with Shyaithan's autograph.

== Track listing ==
All tracks are written by Shyaithan.

No.	Title	Length
1.	"Worshippers of the Seventh Tyranny"	38:32

== Credits ==
- Shyaithan – vocals, bass guitar
- Eskathon – guitar
- Kekko – guitar
- Andrea Janko – drums
- Fabio Zperandio – Guest solos
- Lord Sickness – Artwork
- Christophe Szpajdel – Logo
