= Angelcorpse =

American blackened death metal band

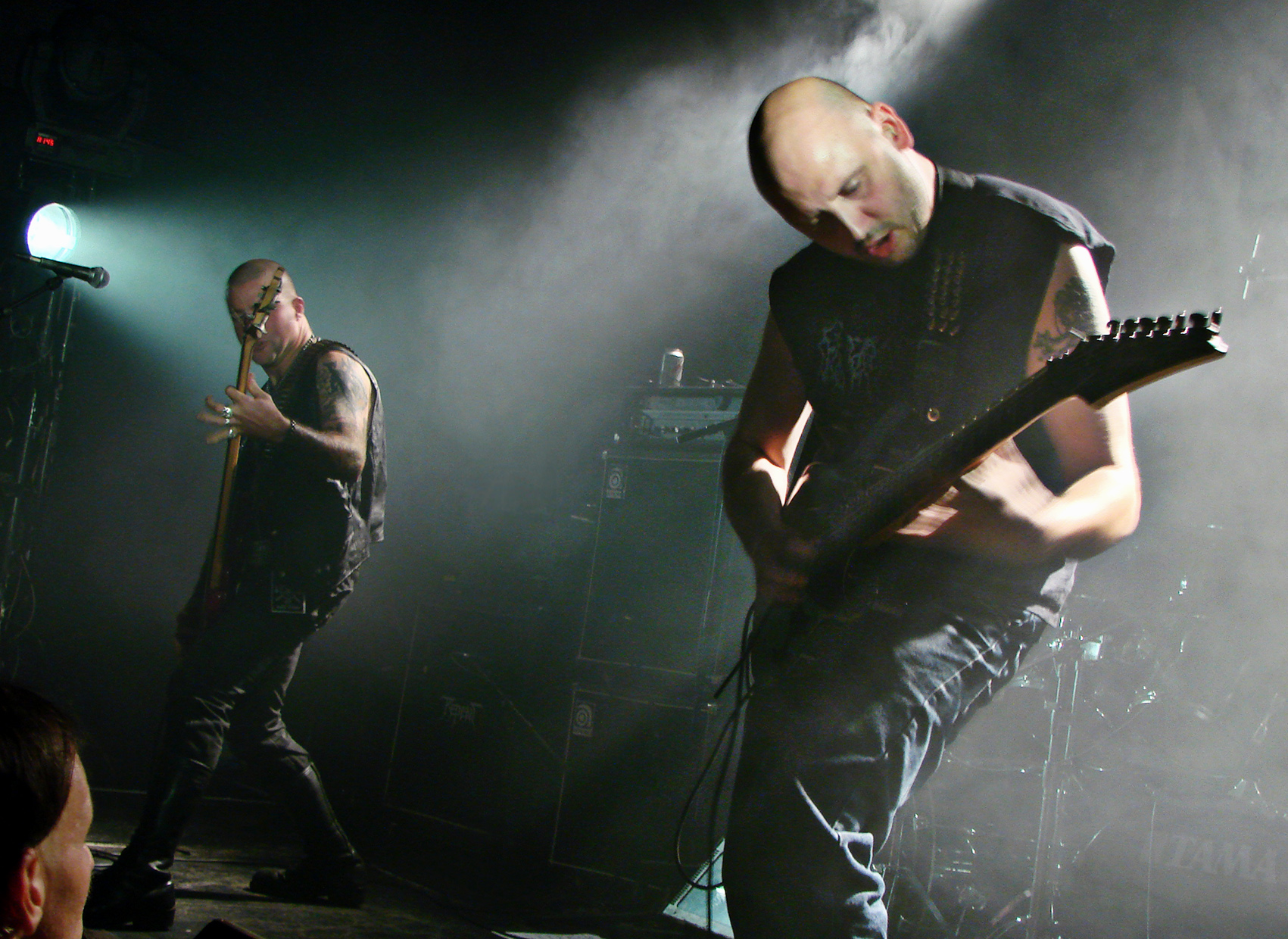
- Angelcorpse performing in Paris, 2008

Background information
- Origin: Kansas City, Missouri, U.S.
- Genres: Blackened death metal, blackened thrash metal
- Years active: 1995–2000, 2006–2009, 2015–2017
- Labels: Osmose Productions; The End Records
- Spinoff of: Order from Chaos
- Members: Pete Helmkamp; Gene Palubicki; Andrea Janko
- Past members: Bill Taylor; Steve Bailey; Tony Laureano; John Longstreth; Paul Collier

Angelcorpse was a blackened death metal band formed after the demise of Pete Helmkamp's previous band, Order from Chaos. Originally from Kansas City, Missouri, they relocated to Tampa, Florida.

Metal Injection described the band's style as "blindingly fast". Some journalists consider Angelcorpse an overlooked extreme metal band. In 2025, Vice wrote, "Angelcorpse wrote some of the best thrashy, unholy death metal to ever be unleashed from the Everglades. The band’s debut album, Hammer of Gods is a must-listen, as is their second full-length, Exterminate."

== History ==
Angelcorpse formed in 1995, with Helmkamp, guitarist Gene Palubicki, and drummer John Longstreth. They recorded the demo Goats to Azazael and signed with Osmose Productions. The band's debut album, Hammer of Gods, was released in 1996, after which rhythm guitarist Bill Taylor joined, playing on second album Exterminate (1998). Drummer Tony Laureano joined after its release while Taylor left. The band's third album, The Inexorable, was released in the fall of 1999, after which Taylor rejoined. While on tour with Immortal, Satyricon, and Krisiun, in support of The Inexorable, Helmkamp was injured in an accident. On that tour, Helmkamp's girlfriend was stabbed, and he left the band. The rest of the band continued for a while and then split up.

In 2006, the band reformed and recorded a new album. Helmkamp said of the reunion, "It just seems like the planets realigned. It's not like we didn't get along or that there were any bridges to mend."

The band was involved in a number of American and European tours with other metal acts such as Immortal, Krisiun, Cianide, and Watain. They completed an East Coast USA tour in May 2007. In 2008, the band embarked on a larger European tour with Revenge and Arkhon Infaustus. This tour included a performance at the United Metal Maniacs Open Air Festival in Bitterfeld Germany. Upon returning to the US, they completed live dates on the West Coast with Cemetery Urn, Sanguis Imperum, Gospel of the Horns, and Ares Kingdom. On April 7, 2009, the members announced their disbandment, citing "musical differences" as the reason.

Helmkamp claimed that the band was fueled by "the constant struggle, strife, camaraderie, and unified will that forged the iron, blood, and blasphemy of our music and lyrics".

As of 2015, the band temporarily reformed for select live dates. It was a one-time live reunion that would not produce new material. After the reunion dates in 2017, the band split up permanently.

== Other projects ==
Angelcorpse guitarist Gene Palubicki has played with a death/thrash metal project called Blasphemic Cruelty. Their debut album is Devil's Mayhem. Gina Ambrosio played drums in the band and Alex Blume played bass and sang. Juan 'Punchy' Gonzalez engineered the album. They signed to Hells Headbangers Records in 2012.

== Discography ==
- Goats to Azazel (demo, 1995)
- Hammer of Gods (1996)
- Nuclear Hell (EP, 1997)
- Wolflust (single, 1997)
- Exterminate (1998)
- Winds of Desecration (EP, split with Martire, 1999)
- The Inexorable (1999)
- Iron, Blood and Blasphemy (compilation of singles, EPs, live songs and original demo, 2000)
- Death Dragons of the Apocalypse (live CD, 2002)
- Of Lucifer and Lightning (2007)

While Angelcorpse's main material is released on Osmose, the singles, EPs, and live albums were released on Gene Palubicki's Evil Vengeance Records.

== Members ==
=== Final lineup ===
- Pete Helmkamp – bass, vocals (1995–2000, 2006–2009, 2015–2017)
- Gene Palubicki – guitars (1995–2000, 2006–2009, 2015–2017)
- Andrea Janko – drums (2016–2017)

=== Former members ===
- Tony Laureano – drums (1998–2000)
- Bill Taylor – guitars (1996–1998, 1999-2000)
- John Longstreth – drums (1995–1998, 2006–2007)
- Paul Collier – drums (2008)
- Terry "Warhead" – drums (2008–2009)
- Ronnie Parmer – drums (2015–2016)
- Ken Phillips – guitars (1999)
