= Osmose Productions =

French independent record label

- Founded: 1991
- Founder: Hervé Herbaut
- Genre: Black metal, death metal
- Country of origin: France
- Location: Beaurainville
- Official website: osmoseproductions.com

Osmose Productions (French: [ɔsmoz]) is a French independent record label created in 1991 by Hervé Herbaut, after he had spent three years running a small mail order company. They specialize mainly in death and black metal bands.

Many of the groups who began with Osmose would move on to sign with larger labels, such as Nuclear Blast, Century Media and Metal Blade.

== Bands ==
- Abominator
- Absu
- Abyssic
- Act of Gods
- Ad Hominem
- Allfader
- Anal Vomit
- Angelcorpse
- Anorexia Nervosa
- Antaeus
- Arkhon Infaustus
- Axis of Advance
- Benighted
- Bestial Mockery
- Bewitched
- Black Witchery
- Blasphemy
- Cirith Gorgor
- Dark Tranquillity
- Dellamorte
- Dementor
- Demoniac
- Demonized
- Detonation
- Diabolical Masquerade
- Diabolos Rising
- Disastrous Murmur
- Divine Decay
- Driller Killer
- Elysian Blaze
- Enslaved
- Exciter
- Exmortem
- Extreme Noise Terror
- Gehennah
- Goat Semen
- Godus
- Hacavitz (band)
- Houwitser
- Immortal
- Impaled Nazarene
- Imperial
- Impiety
- Infernö
- Inhume
- Kaoteon
- Kristendom
- Laethora
- Lifelover
- Lost Soul
- Loud Pipes (band)
- Malmonde
- Mantak
- Marduk
- Masacre
- Master's Hammer
- Melechesh
- Merciless
- Minenwerfer
- Mord
- Mütiilation
- Mystifier
- Necromantia
- Nordjevel
- Notre Dame
- Obligatorisk Tortyr
- Obtest
- Order from Chaos
- Pan.Thy.Monium
- Phazm
- Portal
- Profanatica
- Pyogenesis
- Raism
- Ravager
- Revenge
- Ritual Carnage
- The Rocking Dildos
- Rok
- Rotting Christ
- Sadistik Exekution
- Samael
- Seth
- Shadows Land
- Shining
- Sigh
- Sjodogg
- Stillhet
- Sublime Cadaveric Decomposition
- Sulphur
- Swordmaster
- Tsathoggua
- Thesyre
- Thornspawn
- Totalselfhatred
- The Evil
- The Unkinds
- The Sarcophagus
- Vehementor
- Vondur
- Vital Remains
- Yyrkoon

== See also ==
- List of record labels
