= Fury =

Fury most often refers to:

- Rage (emotion), or fury

Fury or FURY may also refer to:

== Arts, entertainment and media ==
=== Comics ===
- Fury (1994 one-shot)
- Fury (2001 series)
- Fury (2023 one-shot)

=== Fictional characters ===
- Bryan Fury, a Tekken character
- Fury, the main protagonist of Darksiders III
- Dr. John Fury, in the 2009 movie Whiteout
- Nick Fury, a Marvel Comics character
  - Nick Fury Jr, his son
- Rex Fury, the main antagonist of LEGO City Undercover
- Fury (DC Comics), the name of three characters
- Fury (Marvel Comics), an android
- Fury, in Power Rangers Dino Charge and Power Rangers Dino Super Charge
- Fury, the powered-up version of Andy Baker from Ghostforce, an animated television series
- The Fury, from the video game Metal Gear Solid 3: Snake Eater

=== Films ===
- Fury (1923 film), an American silent film by Henry King
- Fury (1936 film), an American drama by Fritz Lang
- Fury (1947 film), an Italian drama
- Fury (1948 film), an American film, also known as Thunderhoof and Wild Fury
- The Fury (1978 film), a horror thriller by Brian De Palma
- Fury (2012 film), British title of The Samaritan
- Fury (2014 film), a war film
  - Fury: Original Motion Picture Soundtrack
- The Fury (2016 film), a Dutch film

=== Gaming ===
- Fury (video game), an online role-playing game
- The Fury (video game), a racing game
- Fury, a character profession in the game Shadowbane

=== Literature ===
- Fury (Rushdie novel), 2001
- Fury (Star Wars novel), 2007
- The Fury (Timms novel), 1954
- The Fury (Farris novel), 1976
- Fury, a 1947 novel by Henry Kuttner

=== Music ===
- Fury Records, an American record label
- Fury (Australian band), a thrash metal band
- Fury (American band), a hardcore punk band
- Fury UK, a British heavy metal band
- Fury (DJ), American DJ Steve Blakley
- Billy Fury, stage name of English singer and musician Ronald Wycherley (1940–1983)
- Rachel Fury, stage name of Rachel Brennock (born 1961), English singer, songwriter and actress
- Fury (Sick Puppies album), 2016
- Fury (Upon a Burning Body album), 2022
- The Fury (album), 1985, by Gary Numan
- "Fury" (song), by Prince, 2006
- Fury, a 2018 album by Stefano Lentini
- "Fury", a bonus track by Muse from Absolution, 2003
- "The Fury", song by Derek Sherinian from Black Utopia, 2003

=== Television ===
- Fury (American TV series), a 1950s American western series
- Fury (Russian TV series), an upcoming Russian series
- "Fury" (Star Trek: Voyager), an episode of the television series
- "The Fury" (The Amazing World of Gumball), an episode of the television series

== People ==
- Fury (surname), including a list of people with the name

== Places ==
- Fury Island (Ottawa), an island of Ontario, Canada
- Hecla and Fury Islands, Nunavut, Canada
- Fury Island, Bárbara Channel, Chile
- Mount Fury, Washington, U.S.

== Sport ==
=== Australia ===
- Kemblawarra Fury FC, a New South Wales football club
- Northern Fury FC, a Queensland soccer club
- Western Fury, a women's cricket team

=== Canada ===
- Fury Stakes, a Thoroughbred horse race run annually at Toronto
- Ontario Fury, an indoor soccer team
- Ottawa Fury SC, a soccer team 2005–2013
- Ottawa Fury FC, a soccer team 2014–2019
- Prince George Fury, a soccer team 2009–2010
- Whitby Fury, an ice hockey team
- Winnipeg Fury, a soccer team

=== Mexico ===
- Monterrey Fury, a Mexican soccer team

=== United States ===
- Columbus Fury, an indoor volleyball team
- Corpus Christi Fury, an indoor football team
- Detroit Fury, an arena football team
- Fort Wayne Fury, a basketball team
- Long Island Fury, a women's soccer team
- Miami Fury, a women's American football team
- Muskegon Fury, later Muskegon Lumberjacks, an ice hockey team
- Philadelphia Fury (2011–2019), American soccer team in the National Independent Soccer Association
- Philadelphia Fury (1978–1980), American soccer team in the North American Soccer League
- Rockford Fury, a basketball team

== Military ==
- Anduril FQ-44 Fury, American UCAV
- HMS Fury, the name of several Royal Navy ships
- USS Fury, the name of two U.S. Navy ships
- Hawker Fury, a 1930s British biplane fighter
- Hawker Sea Fury, initially called Fury, a post-war British fighter aircraft
- North American FJ-1 Fury, a 1940s U.S. Navy straight-wing jet aircraft
- North American FJ-2/-3 Fury, 1950s U.S. Navy and Marine Corps swept-wing jet aircraft
- North American FJ-4 Fury, a 1950s/60s U.S. Navy and Marine Corps fighter-bomber

== Transportation ==
=== Aircraft ===
- Felixstowe Fury, a British triplane flying-boat
- LoPresti Fury, a 1980s American sports plane

=== Motor vehicles ===
- BSA Fury, a British prototype motorcycle
- Honda Fury, a motorcycle
- Plymouth Fury, an American car
- Royal Enfield Fury, the name of several motorcycles
- Sylva Fury, a British kit car

=== Rail ===
- LMS 6399 Fury, an experimental steam locomotive

== Other uses ==
- Fury (roller coaster), in Bobbejaanland, Belgium
- Fury 325, a roller coaster in Carowinds amusement park, U.S.
- Fellowship of United Reformed Youth (FURY), a church youth organization
- Furies or Erinyes, figures in Greek mythology
- .277 Fury, a rifle cartridge introduced by SIG Sauer

== See also ==
- Furia (disambiguation)
- Furie (disambiguation)
- Furies (disambiguation)
- Furio (disambiguation)
- Furiosa (disambiguation)
- Furioso (disambiguation)
- Furious (disambiguation)
- Furry (disambiguation)
- Furey, a surname
- Fury3, a 1996 video game
- The Furys (disambiguation)
