= Furie =

Furie may refer to:

- Furie (film), a 2019 action martial arts film
- HMS Wilhelmina (1798), previously Dutch frigate Furie
- Sidney J. Furie (born 1933), Canadian film director
- John Furie (born 1948), English footballer

== See also ==
- Furey, a surname
- Furies (disambiguation)
- Fury (disambiguation)
