= Furios =

Furios may refer to:

- Iván Furios (born 1979), an Argentinian footballer

== See also ==
- Furio (disambiguation)
- Furiosa (disambiguation)
- Furioso (disambiguation)
- Furious (disambiguation)
