= Furio =

Furio may refer to:

- Furio (given name), including a list of people with the name
- Furio (surname), including a list of people with the name
- Falcomposite Furio, a kit-plane

== See also ==
- Furios (disambiguation)
- Furiosa (disambiguation)
- Furioso (disambiguation)
- Furious (disambiguation)
- Fury (disambiguation)
