= Bethlehem (German band) =

German metal band

- Origin: Grevenbroich, Germany
- Genres: Dark metal, depressive suicidal black metal
- Years active: 1991–present
- Labels: Nightmare, Adipocere, Red Stream Inc., Prophecy Productions
- Members: Yvonne "Onielar" Wilczynska – vocals; Ilya Karzov – guitars; Florian "Torturer" Klein – drums; Sven "Velnias" Galinsky – live guitar
- Past members: Jürgen Bartsch – bass, synthesizer (1991–2025; died 2025); Klaus Matton – guitars; Andreas Classen – vocals; Olaf Eckhardt – guitars; Oliver Schmidt – session keyboards (on Thy Pale Dominion); Chris Steinhoff – drums (until Dictius te necare); Sephiroth – vocals (1994); Michael Schneider – guitars; Rainer Landfermann – vocals (on Dictius te necare and Alles tot); Cathrin Campen – vocals (on S.U.I.Z.I.D. and Reflektionen aufs Sterben); Marcus Losen, also known as Zahgurim – drums (1996–1998; on S.U.I.Z.I.D. and Reflektionen aufs Sterben); Marco Kehren – vocals (on S.U.I.Z.I.D. and Reflektionen aufs Sterben); Christian Houben – vocals (on Schatten aus der Alexander Welt); Reiner Tiedemann – keyboards, remixes (on Schatten aus der Alexander Welt and Suicide Radio); Guido Meyer de Voltaire – vocals (on Schatten aus der Alexander Welt, Mein Weg and Hexakosioihexekontahexaphobia); Andreas Tekath – session keyboards (on Mein Weg); Ferdinando "Herr Morbid" Merchisio – guitars (2009); Jonathan Théry – vocals (on Suizidal-Ovipare Todessehnsucht and Gestern starb ich schon heute); Niklas Kvarforth – vocals (on A Sacrificial Offering to the Kingdom of Heaven in a Cracked Dog's Ear and Stönkfitzchen); Steve Wolz – drums; Malte Langenbrinck – vocals (2011); Rogier Droog – vocals (2012); Alexander Schmied – vocals (2012–2013); Reuben Jordan – guitars

Bethlehem is a German dark metal band from Grevenbroich, formed in 1991 by bassist Jürgen Bartsch, guitarist Klaus Matton and vocalist Andreas Classen. Band leader Bartsch was its only constant member until his death in 2025.

Bethlehem are associated with the development of dark metal and depressive suicidal black metal. The term "dark metal" is frequently traced Bethlehem's 1994 debut album, Dark Metal, although Katatonia had used the phrase "sorrowfilled and harmonous Northern Dark Metal" in promotional material.

== Name ==
The band's name refers to the city of Bethlehem and its importance in Christianity. According to Bartsch, the name was chosen out of sarcasm and to avoid censorship during the tape trading era of the early 1990s in heavily regulated countries such as Cuba and Vietnam.

== History ==
=== Formation and early releases (1991–1995) ===
Bethlehem was founded in Grevenbroich in 1991 by Jürgen Bartsch on bass and synthesizer, Klaus Matton on guitar, and singer Andreas Classen. Bartsch was unrelated to German child murderer Jürgen Bartsch.

The band released its first record, the 7-inch single Thy Pale Dominion, through Nightmare Records in 1993. Their debut album, Dark Metal, followed in 1994 on Adipocere Records. Classen sang on the early releases, but left the band after Dark Metal and later founded black metal band Paragon Belial.

=== Red Stream period and Gummo soundtrack appearance (1996–1998) ===
Bethlehem's second studio album, Dictius te necare, was released by Red Stream in 1996. On this album, Rainer Landfermann of German death metal band Pavor took over vocals. In a review for Doom-Metal.com, Kostas Panagiotou described Landfermann's performance as "one of the sickest and most extreme voices you'll ever hear from a human being".

The album Sardonischer Untergang im Zeichen irreligiöser Darbietung, abbreviated as S.U.I.Z.I.D., was released through Red Stream in 1998. Landfermann was replaced with Marco Kehren of Deinonychus, while Marcus Losen, of Paragon Belial, played drums. Losen left the band in 1998. That year, Bethlehem contributed the tracks "Schuld uns'res knöcherigen Faltpferds" and "Verschleierte Irreligiösität" to the soundtrack of American film Gummo.

=== Prophecy Productions and Meyer de Voltaire albums (1999–2006) ===
In 1999, Bethlehem moved from Red Stream to Prophecy Productions. The 7-inch single Profane Fetmilch Lenzt Elf Krank was released in 2000, followed by the album Schatten aus der Alexander Welt on 17 September 2001. Three years later, Mein Weg was released on 17 November 2004. Guido Meyer de Voltaire, who sang on both albums, was known for his work with metal band Aardvarks. He left Bethlehem in 2006 after internal disputes.

=== Split releases and Kvarforth material (2007–2010) ===
In 2007, Bartsch announced Ferdinando "Herr Morbid" Merchisio of Italian dark metal band Forgotten Tomb as Bethlehem's new guitarist. Bartsch stated that he was working with Merchisio on an album intended to be recorded in England at Priory Recording Studios with Greg Chandler of Esoteric.

On 14 May 2009, Bethlehem released the split 7-inch single Suizidal-Ovipare Todessehnsucht with American black metal band Benighted in Sodom through Obscure Abhorrence Productions. Bethlehem's side featured "Du sollst dich töten" from S.U.I.Z.I.D., with guitar solos and vocals by Jonathan Théry of French band Ataraxie.

Later in 2009, Niklas Kvarforth of Swedish black metal band Shining became Bethlehem's vocalist. Reuben Jordan of Benighted in Sodom was announced as a guitarist. On 12 June 2009, Red Stream released A Sacrificial Offering to the Kingdom of Heaven in a Cracked Dog's Ear. The album was a partly re-recorded version of S.U.I.Z.I.D. with vocals by Kvarforth and lyrics translated from German into English.

The EP Stönkfitzchen was released on 22 October 2010. It contained six tracks, four of them new. Kvarforth sang in German for the first time with Bethlehem. Bartsch played bass, Olaf Eckhardt played guitar, and Steve Wolz played drums.

=== Later albums with Meyer de Voltaire and Onielar (2014–2019) ===
On 10 October 2014, ten years after Mein Weg, Bethlehem released the studio album Hexakosioihexekontahexaphobia (wikt) through Prophecy Productions. It was recorded in August and September 2014 at Klangschmiede Studio E, produced by Bartsch, and engineered and mastered by Markus Stock. Florian "Torturer" Klein of Mor Dagor played drums, Olaf Eckhardt played guitar, and Guido Meyer de Voltaire sang. Meyer de Voltaire stated after the recordings that this would be his final collaboration with the band. A limited two-CD edition of the album, restricted to 250 copies, included the bonus disc Vergor'n im Spinnenmaul.

For the band's 25th anniversary, the self-titled album Bethlehem was released by Prophecy Productions on 2 December 2016. It was recorded in May and June 2016 at Klangschmiede Studio E in Mellrichstadt. Yvonne "Onielar" Wilczynska of Darkened Nocturn Slaughtercult sang, with Bartsch on bass, Steve Wolz on drums and Ilya Karzov on guitar.

Bethlehem's eighth full-length studio album, Lebe dich leer, was released by Prophecy Productions on 17 May 2019. It was recorded in August and September 2018 in North Rhine-Westphalia at Soundsight Studio in Hennef and Stonehenge Studio in Siegburg by Armin Rave. Wilczynska sang, Bartsch played bass, Karzov played guitar, and Klein played drums. The album reached number 49 on the German albums chart.

=== Death of Jürgen Bartsch (2025) ===
Jürgen Bartsch died on 27 August 2025 after a long illness. He was 58.

== Style ==
=== Lyrics ===
With the exception of "Gepriesen sei der Untergang", the debut album Dark Metal consists of songs with English-language lyrics. On later releases, Bethlehem's lyrics were primarily written in German. An exception is the material featuring Niklas Kvarforth, who, according to Bartsch, had difficulty pronouncing German lyrics.

Many of Bethlehem's songs have morbid lyrics and deal with themes such as suicide and depression. Bartsch often used encrypted, metaphorical language, neologisms and playful word formations, giving the lyrics an obscure and puzzling quality. Although some listeners interpreted the lyrics as deliberately meaningless or almost Dadaist, Bartsch rejected that interpretation. In an interview with Bleeding4Metal, he said:

No. Dadaism is an art form. I encrypt my lyrics through strong metaphors, and people who are personally close to me also know what they are about. Therefore it is not Dadaism, not art, but an encryption of my intimate side.

According to Bartsch, Bethlehem's lyrics attracted attention from students of German literature and were also mentioned by The New York Times in a column on unusual lyrics.

=== Music ===
On Dictius te necare, Bethlehem played music close to doom metal, black metal and death metal, combined into a dark, melancholic and depressive atmosphere that the band called dark metal. The album alternates between fast passages and slow, bleak sections typical of doom metal. Landfermann's vocals consist largely of shrieks and death growls and vary widely in volume, aggression and pitch.

Over time, Bethlehem's style changed. On Mein Weg in 2004, the band's earlier black metal and death metal elements became less prominent, while influences from Neue Deutsche Härte, gothic metal and electronic music became more apparent. On the EP Stönkfitzchen, the band moved closer again to its earlier style.

Hexakosioihexekontahexaphobia is stylistically connected to Schatten aus der Alexander Welt and Mein Weg. Guido Meyer de Voltaire primarily used deep clean vocals on these three albums, but also switched to guttural vocals. In the booklet for Hexakosioihexekontahexaphobia, Bartsch described the three albums as a conceptual and stylistic trilogy, representing the band's "second phase", which ended with the 2014 album.

The albums Bethlehem and Lebe dich leer, both featuring Yvonne "Onielar" Wilczynska, returned stylistically to the early albums Dictius te necare and S.U.I.Z.I.D.. Bartsch described these releases as the band's "third phase".

== Members ==
=== Current members ===
- Yvonne "Onielar" Wilczynska – vocals
- Ilya Karzov – guitars
- Florian "Torturer" Klein – drums
- Sven "Velnias" Galinsky – live guitar

=== Former and session members ===
- Jürgen Bartsch – bass guitar, synthesizer, keyboards, guitars (1991–2025; died 2025)
- Klaus Matton – guitars
- Andreas Classen – vocals
- Olaf Eckhardt – guitars
- Oliver Schmidt – session keyboards on Thy Pale Dominion
- Chris Steinhoff – drums
- Sephiroth – vocals
- Michael Schneider – guitars
- Rainer Landfermann – vocals on Dictius te necare and Alles tot
- Cathrin Campen – vocals on S.U.I.Z.I.D. and Reflektionen aufs Sterben
- Marcus Losen, also known as Zahgurim – drums on S.U.I.Z.I.D. and Reflektionen aufs Sterben
- Marco Kehren – vocals on S.U.I.Z.I.D. and Reflektionen aufs Sterben
- Christian Houben – vocals on Schatten aus der Alexander Welt
- Reiner Tiedemann – keyboards on Schatten aus der Alexander Welt, remixes on Suicide Radio
- Guido Meyer de Voltaire – vocals on Schatten aus der Alexander Welt, Mein Weg and Hexakosioihexekontahexaphobia
- Andreas Tekath – session keyboards on Mein Weg
- Ferdinando "Herr Morbid" Merchisio – guitars
- Jonathan Théry – vocals on Suizidal-Ovipare Todessehnsucht and Gestern starb ich schon heute
- Niklas Kvarforth – vocals on A Sacrificial Offering to the Kingdom of Heaven in a Cracked Dog's Ear and Stönkfitzchen
- Steve Wolz – drums
- Malte Langenbrinck – vocals
- Rogier Droog – vocals
- Alexander Schmied – vocals
- Reuben Jordan – guitars

== Discography ==
=== Studio albums ===
- Dark Metal (1994)
- Dictius te necare (1996)
- Sardonischer Untergang im Zeichen irreligiöser Darbietung (1998)
- Schatten aus der Alexander Welt (2001)
- Mein Weg (2004)
- Hexakosioihexekontahexaphobia (2014)
- Bethlehem (2016)
- Lebe dich leer (2019)

=== Other albums ===
- A Sacrificial Offering to the Kingdom of Heaven in a Cracked Dog's Ear (2009) – reworked version of S.U.I.Z.I.D. with newly recorded vocals; released on vinyl in 2022 as The Gospel According to Alexander

=== EPs ===
- Reflektionen aufs Sterben (1998)
- Stönkfitzchen (2010)

=== Split EPs ===
- Wraithen / Bethlehem with Wraithen (2004)
- Suizidal-Ovipare Todessehnsucht with Benighted in Sodom (2009)
- Gestern starb ich schon heute with Joyless (2009)

=== Singles ===
- Thy Pale Dominion (7-inch single, 1993)
- Profane Fetmilch Lenzt Elf Krank (7-inch single, 2000)
- Alles tot (7-inch single, 2004)

=== Demos, compilations and other appearances ===
- Bethlehem demo I (cassette, 1992)
- Bethlehem demo II (cassette, 1993)
- Dark Metal home video (VHS, 1993)
- "Wintermute" on Deathophobia I (Force Production, 1993)
- Requiem (Exhumer Productions, 1993)
- Gummo home video soundtrack appearance (New Line Productions, 1997)
- "Schuld uns'res knoch'rigen Flatpferd" and "Verschleierte Irreligiosität" on Gummo (London Records/EMI, 1997)
- Gepriesen sei der Untergang home video (VHS, Red Stream Inc., 1999)
- "Champagner Freuden in verkäster Leichenfotze" and "Tiermutter" on To Live Is Ever To Be In Danger (Red Stream Inc., 1999)
- "Angst atmet Mord" on Upon a Mighty Bloodred Stream Volume 1 (Red Stream Inc., 1999)
- Suicide Radio (CD-ROM, 2003)
- Legalize Murder (DVD, Comedy, 2007)
- A Tribute to Dictius Te Necare (Ostra, 2009)
- Bethlehems Bastarde (Weird Truth Productions, 2009)
- "Yesterday I Still Died Today" on Niklas Kvarforth – Fifteen Years of Absolute Darkness (Spinefarm Records, 2011)
