= Barfoot =

Barfoot is a surname. Notable people with the surname include:

- Clyde Barfoot (1891–1971), Major League Baseball player who played 25 years in professional baseball
- George Barfoot (1812–1889), English cricketer
- Joan Barfoot (born 1946), Canadian novelist
- Michael Barfoot (born 1980), former English cricketer
- Stuart Barfoot (born 1975), English footballer
- Van T. Barfoot (1919–2012), United States Army officer, Medal of Honor winner
- Walter Barfoot (1893–1978), Canadian Anglican bishop

== See also ==
- Barfoot & Thompson, privately owned, non-franchised real estate company based in Auckland, New Zealand
