= The Silence of December =

The Silence Of December

Studio album by Deinonychus
- Released: 1995
- Recorded: 1994
- Genre: Black/doom; Death/doom
- Length: 59:53
- Label: Cacophonous Records

Deinonychus chronology
Warfare Machines (2007)	The Silence Of December (1995)	The Weeping Of A Thousand Years (1996)

The Silence Of December is the first full-length album from Deinonychus (band). It was released in May 1995, yet recorded in 1994. The album was released on Cacophonous Records from the UK.

== Track listing ==
No.	Title	Length
1.	"Intro - Black Sun"	1:53
2.	"I, Ruler of Paradise in Black"	6:30
3.	"The Silence of December"	4:32
4.	"The Final Affliction of Xafan"	10:22
5.	"A Shining Blaze over Darkland"	6:18
6.	"Under the Autumn Tree"	7:07
7.	"Here Lies My Kingdom"	7:38
8.	"My Travels Through the Midnight Sky"	7:33
9.	"Red Is My Blood... Cold Is My Heart"	5:55
10.	"Outro - Bizarre Landscape"	2:05
