= Cynaeda similella =

Scientific classification
- Domain: Eukaryota
- Kingdom: Animalia
- Phylum: Arthropoda
- Class: Insecta
- Order: Lepidoptera
- Family: Crambidae
- Genus: Cynaeda
- Species: C. similella

Binomial name
- Cynaeda similella (Rothschild, 1915)

Synonyms
- Noctuelia similella Rothschild, 1915

Species of moth

Cynaeda similella is a moth in the family Crambidae. It was described by Rothschild in 1915. It is found in Algeria.

The wingspan is about 31 mm. Adults are similar to Cynaeda allardalis, but differ in some forewing markings. Furthermore, the hindwings are buff. Adults have been recorded on wing in October.
