= Cynaeda dichroalis =

Scientific classification
- Domain: Eukaryota
- Kingdom: Animalia
- Phylum: Arthropoda
- Class: Insecta
- Order: Lepidoptera
- Family: Crambidae
- Genus: Cynaeda
- Species: C. dichroalis

Binomial name
- Cynaeda dichroalis (Hampson, 1903)

Synonyms
- Noctuelia dichroalis Hampson, 1903

Species of moth

Cynaeda dichroalis is a moth in the family Crambidae. It was described by George Hampson in 1903. It is found in Sri Lanka.

The wingspan is about 18 mm. The forewings are bright yellow, the inner area fuscous black to beyond the middle and with spots on the base of the costa. There is a postmedial series of spots. The basal area of the hindwings is fuscous, with yellow spots on it below the cell and on the inner margin, as well as a series of five spots from the costa to the tornus.
