= Fury (surname) =

- Language: Irish

Origin
- Origin: Ireland

Other names
- Variant forms: Ó Fearáin, Furey

Fury is an Irish surname.

It may refer to:

- Danny Fury, Swiss drummer and singer
- David Fury (born 1959), American television writer and producer
- Ed Fury, (born 1928), American bodybuilder, actor and model born Edmund Holovchik
- George Fury (born 1945), Australian retired rally and racing car driver
- Warren Fury (born 1985), Welsh international rugby union player
- A family of boxers:
  - John Fury (born 1964), Irish; father
  - Tyson Fury (born 1988), British; older son
  - Hughie Fury (born 1994), British; nephew
  - Tommy Fury (born 1999), British; younger son

== See also ==
- Fury (disambiguation)
