= Cynaeda leucopsumis =

Scientific classification
- Kingdom: Animalia
- Phylum: Arthropoda
- Class: Insecta
- Order: Lepidoptera
- Family: Crambidae
- Genus: Cynaeda
- Species: C. leucopsumis

Binomial name
- Cynaeda leucopsumis (Hampson, 1919)

Synonyms
- Argyria leucopsumis Hampson, 1919

Species of moth

Cynaeda leucopsumis is a moth in the family Crambidae. It was described by George Hampson in 1919. It is found in Assam, India.

The wingspan is about 24 mm. The forewings are whitish, suffused with rufous and black brown. The costal area is black brown, irrorated (speckled) with blue white. There is a black-brown antemedial line, bordered by white on the inner side. The subterminal line is white, defined by black on the inner side. The hindwings are cupreous brown.
