= Cynaeda forsteri =

Scientific classification
- Domain: Eukaryota
- Kingdom: Animalia
- Phylum: Arthropoda
- Class: Insecta
- Order: Lepidoptera
- Family: Crambidae
- Genus: Cynaeda
- Species: C. forsteri

Binomial name
- Cynaeda forsteri de Lattin, 1951

Species of moth

Cynaeda forsteri is a moth in the family Crambidae. It was described by Gustave de Lattin in 1951. It is found in Russia, where it has been recorded from the southern Ural.
