= Furiosa =

Furiosa may refer to:

- Imperator Furiosa, a character in the 2015 film Mad Max: Fury Road
  - Furiosa: A Mad Max Saga, a 2024 action prequel film directed by George Miller
- Furiosa, a provisional name of the Alfa Romeo MiTo
- Phragmacossia furiosa (P. furiosa), a species of moth in the family Cossidae
- Cynaeda furiosa (C. furiosa), a species of moth in the family Crambidae
- "Furiosa", a song by Anitta from the F9 soundtrack

== See also ==
- Furio (disambiguation)
- Furioso (disambiguation)
- Furious (disambiguation)
- Fury (disambiguation)
