= HMS Fury =

Ten ships of the Royal Navy have borne the name HMS Fury, whilst another was planned but later cancelled:

- HMS Fury (1779) was a 14-gun Swan-class ship-sloop launched in 1779 and broken up in 1787.
- HMS Fury (1782) was a gunboat commissioned in 1782. She was one of 12 that the garrison at Gibraltar launched during the Great Siege of Gibraltar. Each was armed with an 18-pounder gun, and received a crew of 21 men drawn from Royal Navy vessels stationed at Gibraltar. Porcupine provided Fury's crew.
- HMS Fury (1790) was a 16-gun Hound-class sloop launched in 1790. She was converted into a 16-gun bomb vessel in 1798 and broken up in 1811. Because Fury served in the navy's Egyptian campaign between 8 March 1801 and 2 September, her officers and crew qualified for the clasp "Egypt" to the Naval General Service Medal, which the Admiralty authorised in 1850 for all surviving claimants. (Note: A first-class share of the prize money awarded in April 1823 was worth £34 2s 4d; a fifth-class share, that of an able seaman, was worth 3s 11½d. The amount was small as the total had to be shared between 79 vessels and the entire army contingent.)
- HMS Fury (1794) was a 4-gun gunboat, previously a Dutch hoy purchased in 1794 and sold in 1802.
- HMS Fury was to have been an 8-gun bomb vessel. She was ordered in 1812, but the order was cancelled the following year.
- HMS Fury (1814) was an 8-gun bomb vessel launched in 1814. She made two voyages of exploration to the Arctic under William Edward Parry, but on the second one in 1825, she was damaged by ice and abandoned.
- HMS Fury (1834) was a wood paddle vessel purchased in 1834 and broken up in 1843.
- HMS Fury (1845) was a wooden Bulldog-class paddle sloop launched in 1845 and sold in 1864.
- HMS Fury was a turret ship renamed HMS Dreadnought before being launched in 1875.
- HMS Fury (1911) was an Acorn-class destroyer launched in 1911 and sold in 1921.
- HMS Fury (H76) was an F-class destroyer launched in 1934, damaged by a mine in 1944 and broken up later that year.

== Other vessels ==
- Fury may have been one of two schooners built at Calcutta for the Bengal Government in 1799. She served for three years in the Red Sea before being turned over to the government in Bombay. The other was Wasp. They both supported General Baird's expedition to Egypt to help General Ralph Abercromby expel the French there.
