= Cynaeda affinis =

Scientific classification
- Domain: Eukaryota
- Kingdom: Animalia
- Phylum: Arthropoda
- Class: Insecta
- Order: Lepidoptera
- Family: Crambidae
- Genus: Cynaeda
- Species: C. affinis

Binomial name
- Cynaeda affinis (Rothschild, 1915)

Synonyms
- Noctuelia affinis Rothschild, 1915

Species of moth

Cynaeda affinis is a moth in the family Crambidae. It was described by Rothschild in 1915. It is found in Algeria.

The wingspan is about 16 mm. The basal three-fourths of the forewings is cream, powdered with olive-brown. The outer one-quarter is pale blue-grey with a black subterminal line. The hindwings are yellowish wood-grey. Adults have been recorded on wing in April.
