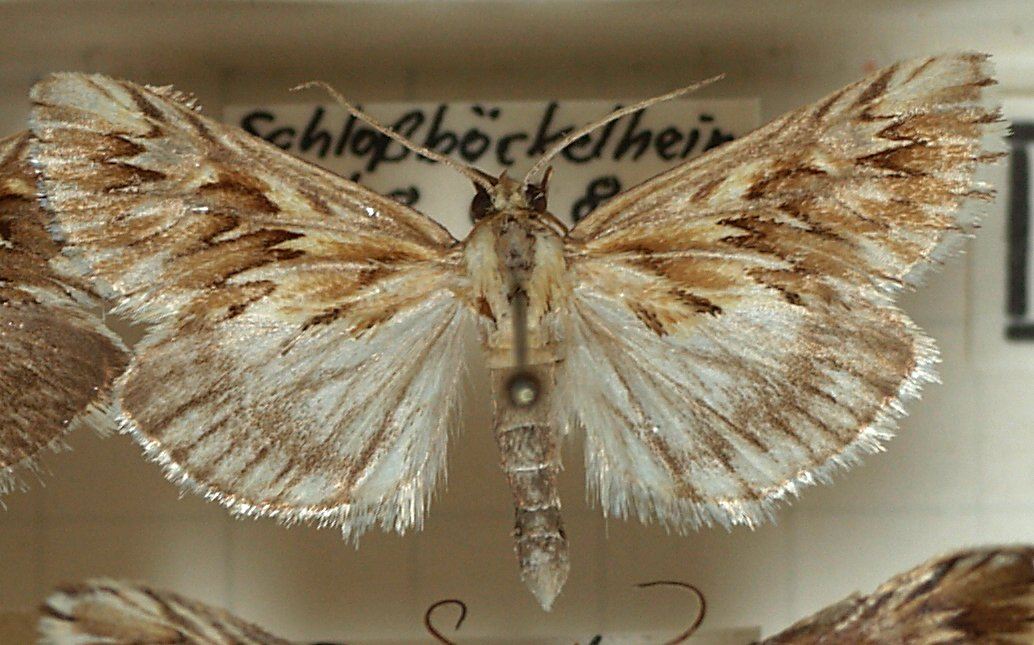
- Cynaeda dentalis

Scientific classification
- Domain: Eukaryota
- Kingdom: Animalia
- Phylum: Arthropoda
- Class: Insecta
- Order: Lepidoptera
- Family: Crambidae
- Subfamily: Odontiinae
- Genus: Cynaeda; Hübner, 1825

Synonyms
- Cynoeda Walker, 1859; Noctuelia Guenée, 1854; Noctuaelia Wocke, 1871; Odontia Duponchel, 1832

= Cynaeda =

Genus of moths

Cynaeda is a genus of moths of the family Crambidae.

== Species ==
- Cynaeda affinis (Rothschild, 1915)
- Cynaeda albidalis (Hampson, 1913)
- Cynaeda allardalis (Oberthür, 1876)
- Cynaeda alticolalis (Christoph, 1877)
- Cynaeda annuliferalis (Hampson, 1913)
- Cynaeda dentalis (Denis & Schiffermüller, 1775)
- Cynaeda dichroalis (Hampson, 1903)
- Cynaeda escherichi (O. Hofmann, 1897)
- Cynaeda forsteri Lattin, 1951
- Cynaeda furiosa Hampson, 1900
- Cynaeda fuscinervis (Hampson, 1896)
- Cynaeda gigantea Wocke, 1871
- Cynaeda globuliferalis (Hampson in Poulton, 1916)
- Cynaeda hilgerti (Rothschild, 1915)
- Cynaeda leucopsumis (Hampson, 1919)
- Cynaeda mardinalis (Staudinger, 1892)
- Cynaeda nepticulalis (O. Hofmann, 1897)
- Cynaeda obscura (Warren, 1892)
- Cynaeda plebejalis (Christoph, 1882)
- Cynaeda puralis (Gaede, 1917)
- Cynaeda rebeli (Amsel, 1935)
- Cynaeda seriziati (Staudinger, 1892)
- Cynaeda similella (Rothschild, 1915)
- Cynaeda superba (Freyer, 1844)
- Cynaeda togoalis (Karsch, 1900)
- Cynaeda yaminalis (Oberthür, 1888)
