= Cynaeda escherichi =

Scientific classification
- Domain: Eukaryota
- Kingdom: Animalia
- Phylum: Arthropoda
- Class: Insecta
- Order: Lepidoptera
- Family: Crambidae
- Genus: Cynaeda
- Species: C. escherichi

Binomial name
- Cynaeda escherichi (O. Hofmann, 1897)

Synonyms
- Aporodes escherichi O. Hofmann, 1897; Noctuelia escherichi

Species of moth

Cynaeda escherichi is a moth in the family Crambidae. It was described by O. Hofmann in 1897. It is found in Turkey.
