= Onielar =

German black metal musician

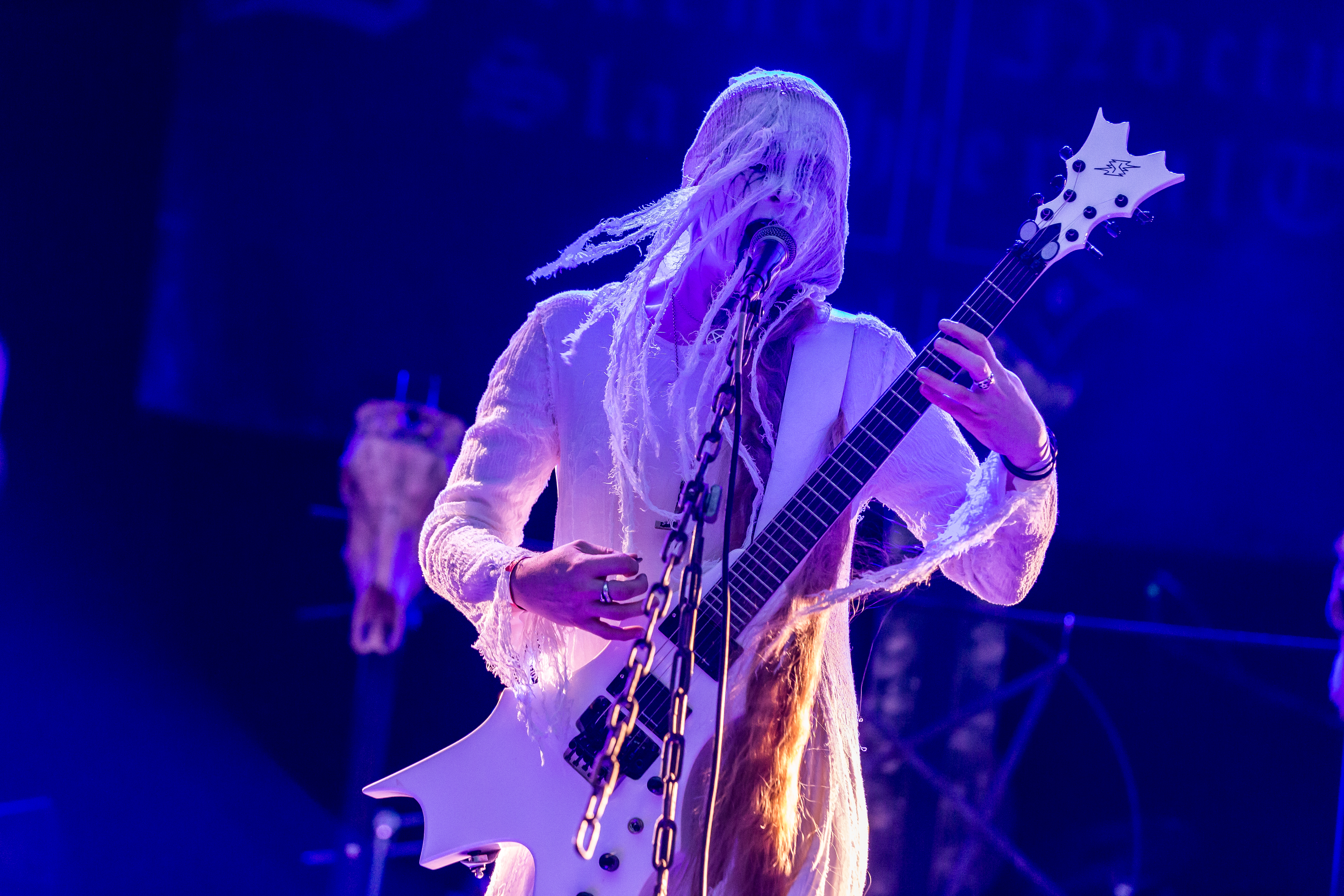
- Onielar performing with Darkened Nocturn Slaughtercult at Party.San Metal Open Air in 2017

Background information
- Born: Yvonne Wilczynski; Grevenbroich, Germany
- Genres: Black metal, dark metal
- Occupations: Singer, guitarist
- Instruments: Vocals, guitar
- Member of: Darkened Nocturn Slaughtercult, Bethlehem

Onielar, born Yvonne Wilczynski, is a German black metal singer and guitarist from Grevenbroich. She is best known as the founder, vocalist and guitarist of the German-Polish black metal band Darkened Nocturn Slaughtercult, and as a vocalist for the German dark metal band Bethlehem.

== Career ==
In 1997, Onielar founded the German-Polish black metal band Darkened Nocturn Slaughtercult in Dormagen. As of February 2022, she was the band's vocalist and guitarist.

From 2016, she also took over vocals for the dark metal band Bethlehem, beginning with the album Bethlehem. She also performed on Bethlehem's 2019 album Lebe dich leer and appeared with the band live.

In Bethlehem, she became one of the successors to the band's co-founder and former vocalist Andreas Classen, who later played bass in Darkened Nocturn Slaughtercult and contributed to at least one of that band's releases.

== Discography ==
=== With Bethlehem ===
- Bethlehem (2016)
- Lebe dich leer (2019)
