= A Pale Debilitating Autumn =

Studio album by Pavor
- Released: 1994
- Recorded: May–July 1994
- Genre: Technical death metal
- Length: 46:22
- Label: Imperator Music GRIM 001 CD
- Producer: Rainer Landfermann, Bernd Gast

Pavor chronology
A Pale Debilitating Autumn (1994)	Furioso (2003)

A Pale Debilitating Autumn is the 1994 debut album by German technical death metal band Pavor.

== Track listing ==
- All songs written & arranged by Pavor.
1. "A Pale Debilitating Autumn" – 6:53
2. "Total Warrior" – 5:34
3. "Corpses" – 5:30
4. "Careworn" – 4:20
5. "Pavor" – 4:50
6. "Imperator Of An Ashen Bane" – 8:16
7. "Fucked By Darkness" – 4:24
8. "Symbols Of Depravity" – 6:35
