= Cynaeda nepticulalis =

Scientific classification
- Domain: Eukaryota
- Kingdom: Animalia
- Phylum: Arthropoda
- Class: Insecta
- Order: Lepidoptera
- Family: Crambidae
- Genus: Cynaeda
- Species: C. nepticulalis

Binomial name
- Cynaeda nepticulalis (O. Hofmann, 1897)

Synonyms
- Aporodes nepticulalis O. Hofmann, 1897

Species of moth

Cynaeda nepticulalis is a moth in the family Crambidae. It was described by O. Hofmann in 1897. It is found in Turkey.
