= Cynaeda obscura =

Scientific classification
- Domain: Eukaryota
- Kingdom: Animalia
- Phylum: Arthropoda
- Class: Insecta
- Order: Lepidoptera
- Family: Crambidae
- Genus: Cynaeda
- Species: C. obscura

Binomial name
- Cynaeda obscura (Warren, 1892)

Synonyms
- Aporodes obscura Warren, 1892

Species of moth

Cynaeda obscura is a moth in the family Crambidae. It was described by Warren in 1892. It is found in Lebanon.
