= Mournument =

Studio album by Deinonychus
- Released: July 8, 2004
- Recorded: Winter – Autumn 2000 at Klangschmiede Studio E, Mellrichstadt, Germany
- Genre: Doom metal, gothic metal
- Length: 57:35
- Label: My Kingdom Music

Deinonychus chronology
Deinonychus (1999)	Mournument (2004)	Insomnia (2004)

Professional ratings
Review scores
Source	Rating
Whiskey Soda –	(favorable)

Mournument is a 2004 album by the Dutch doom metal band Deinonychus. It was recorded for the Italian record label My Kingdom Music and was recorded in Mellrichstadt, Germany.

== Track listing ==
Original CD

Mournument
No.	Title	Writer(s)	Length
1.	"Pluto's Ovoid Orbit"	Marco Kehren	3:16
2.	"Salus Deceived"	M. Kehren	5:55
3.	"Odourless Alliance"	M. Kehren	4:01
4.	"Tantalised in this Labyrinth"	M. Kehren	3:48
5.	"The Crimson Tides–Oceans of Soliloquy Pt. II"	Shane Davison, M. Kehren	6:44
6.	"Selek From Menes"	M. Kehren	4:10
7.	"A Misleading Scenario"	M. Kehren	5:29
8.	"The Obscure Process of Metamorphous"	M. Kehren, S. Davison	4:47
9.	"Arrival in Mesopotamia"	M. Kehren	5:44
10.	"Ancient Dream (Candlemass Cover)"	Leif Edling	6:37
11.	"Ascension—The 40th Day After Easter"	M. Kehren	6:56
Total length:			57:35

== Personnel ==
Performers

- Staff Glover – bass
- Marco Kehren – vocals, guitar, bass
- Arkdae – keyboard
- William A. Sarginson – Drums

Production

- William A. Sarginson – Drumtracks
- Marco Kehren – Mixed and Mastered
- Markus Stock – Mixed and Mastered
