= Cynaeda superba =

Scientific classification
- Domain: Eukaryota
- Kingdom: Animalia
- Phylum: Arthropoda
- Class: Insecta
- Order: Lepidoptera
- Family: Crambidae
- Genus: Cynaeda
- Species: C. superba

Binomial name
- Cynaeda superba (Freyer, 1845)

Synonyms
- Noctua superba Freyer, 1845; Cynaeda superbalis Herrich-Schäffer, 1848; Cynaeda petitjeanii Oberthür, 1876

Species of moth

Cynaeda superba is a species of moth in the family Crambidae. It is found in the Republic of Macedonia.

The wingspan is about 23 mm.
