= Cynaeda plebejalis =

Scientific classification
- Domain: Eukaryota
- Kingdom: Animalia
- Phylum: Arthropoda
- Class: Insecta
- Order: Lepidoptera
- Family: Crambidae
- Genus: Cynaeda
- Species: C. plebejalis

Binomial name
- Cynaeda plebejalis (Christoph, 1882)

Synonyms
- Noctuelia plebejalis Christoph, 1882

Species of moth

Cynaeda plebejalis is a moth in the family Crambidae. It was described by Hugo Theodor Christoph in 1882. It is found in Azerbaijan.
