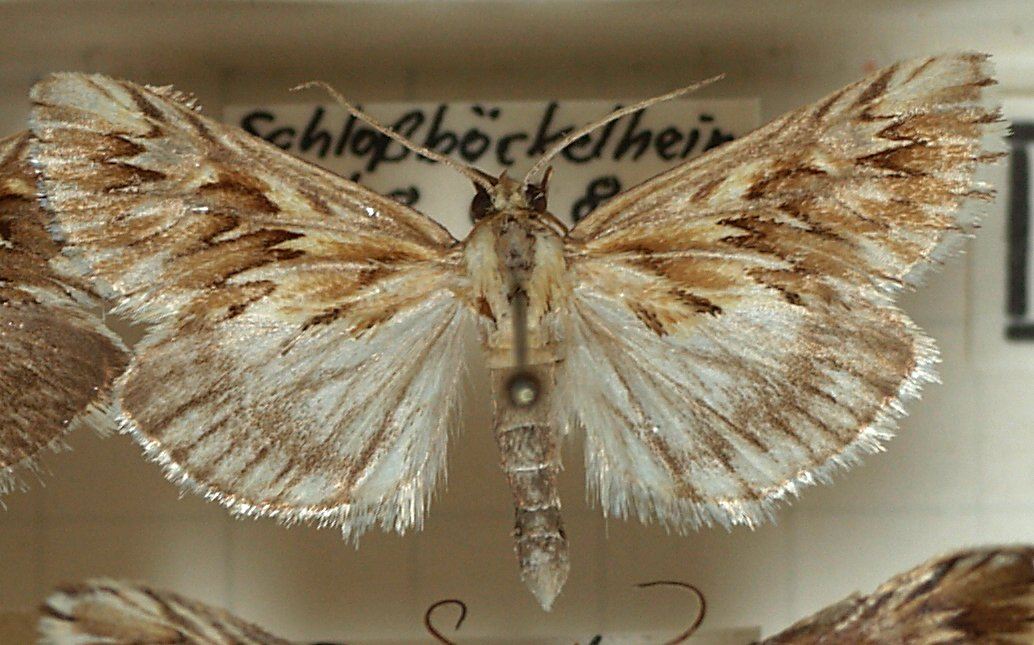

Scientific classification
- Kingdom: Animalia
- Phylum: Arthropoda
- Clade: Pancrustacea
- Class: Insecta
- Order: Lepidoptera
- Family: Crambidae
- Genus: Cynaeda
- Species: C. dentalis

Binomial name
- Cynaeda dentalis (Denis & Schiffermüller, 1775)

Synonyms
- List: Pyralis dentalis Denis & Schiffermüller, 1775; Cynaeda dentalis ab. clara Skala, 1928; Cynaeda dentalis ab. pygmaealis Amsel, 1935; Cynaeda dentalis f. pallida Lattin, 1951; Cynaeda dentalis dilutalis Lattin, 1959; Noctua fulminans Fabricius, 1794; Cynaeda dentalis occidentalis Viette, 1958; Phalaena Noctua radiata Esper, 1796; Phalaena ramalis Fabricius, 1794

= Cynaeda dentalis =

Species of moth

Cynaeda dentalis is a species of moth of the family Crambidae. It is found in Europe, Jordan, Turkey and Cape Verde.

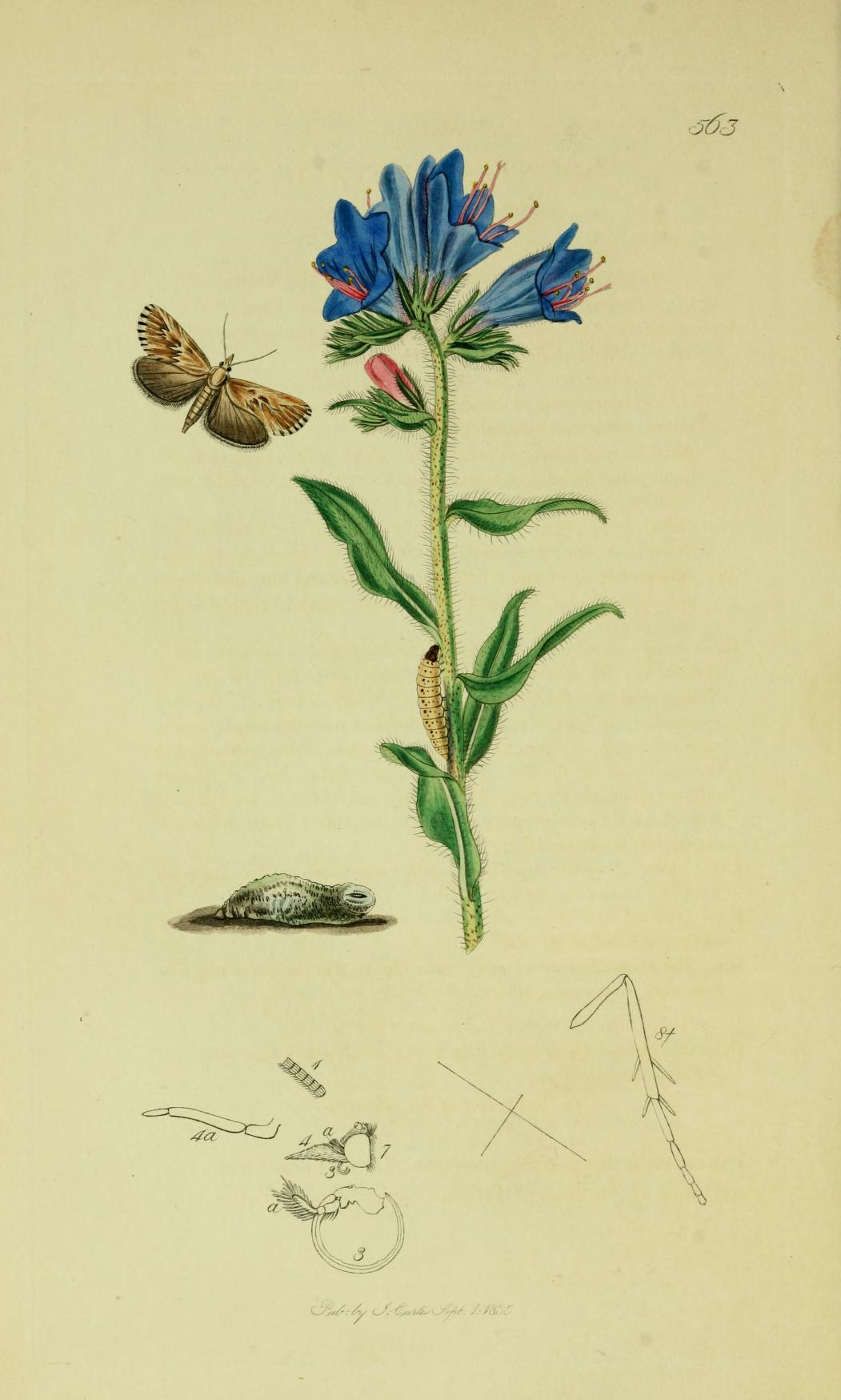
Illustration from John Curtis's British Entomology Volume 6

The wingspan is 19–22 millimetres (0.75–0.87 in). The moth flies from June to August depending on the location.

The larvae feed on viper's bugloss (Echium vulgare).
