= Deinonychus (band) =

Dutch doom metal band

- Origin: Brunssum, Netherlands
- Genres: Black/doom, death/doom
- Years active: 1992–2008, 2016-present
- Labels: Cacophonous Rec, My Kingdom Music
- Members: Marco Kehren; Steve Wolz; Markus Stock
- Past members: William Sarginson; Maurice Swinkels; Fabien Pereira; John Bartels; Staff Glover; Jürgen Bartsch; Alessio Fagrelli
- Website: Deinonychus Facebook Profile

Deinonychus is a Dutch doom metal band formed in 1992 by Marco Kehren. There is a relationship between Deinonychus and German band Bethlehem. Kehren provided vocals on S.U.I.Z.I.D., Reflektionen auf's Sterben and Profane Fetmilch Lenzt Elf Krank, while Bethlehem bassist and lyricist Jürgen Bartsch joined Deinonychus in 2005. The first three albums and early demos released as After the Rain Falls...An Empty Sky Remains, feature Kehren on instruments and vocals. 1999's Deinonychus added Cradle of Filth drummer William Sarginson, and 2002's Mournument was recorded with a full band. The band announced their disbandment in September 2008. Kehren runs the martial industrial band Nihil Novi Sub Sole.

Deinonychus reformed in 2016 with a new line up consisting of Marco Kehren (guitars, bass, vocals), Steve Wolz (drums) and Markus Stock (keyboards). The band recorded the album Ode to Acts of Murder, Dystopia and Suicide, released on My Kingdom Music worldwide in October 2017.

== Discography ==
Title	Release date	Label
The Silence of December	1995	Cacophonous Records
When The Rain Falls	1996	Guttural
The Weeping of a Thousand Years	1996	Cacophonous Records
Ark of Thought	1997	Supernal
Deinonychus	1999	Ars Metalli
Mournument	2002	My Kingdom Music
Insomnia	2004	My Kingdom Music
Warfare Machines	2007	My Kingdom Music
Ode to Acts of Murder, Dystopia and Suicide	2017	My Kingdom Music
