= Furioso =

Furioso may refer to:

== Horses ==
- Furioso, a Hungarian Thoroughbred stallion foaled in 1836, foundation stallion of the
  - Furioso or Furioso-North Star horse breed of Hungary
- Furioso (British horse), a British Thoroughbred stallion foaled in 1939
- Furioso II, the son of the above, a Selle Français stallion foaled in 1965
- Furioso (Japanese horse), a Japanese Thoroughbred racehorse.

== Arts and entertainment ==
- Furioso, a musical tempo indication
- Furioso (film), a 1950 West German film directed by Johannes Meyer
- Furioso (album), by Pavor, 2003
- Furioso (Dimension Six), a 1980 role-playing game
- Furioso, a literary magazine by James Jesus Angleton and Reed Whittemore
- Il furioso all'isola di San Domingo, or Il furioso, an opera by Donizetti

== People ==
- Tintoretto (1518–1594), an Italian painter nicknamed Il Furioso

== See also ==
- Furio (disambiguation)
- Furiosa (disambiguation)
- Furious (disambiguation)
- Fury (disambiguation)
- Orlando Furioso, an Italian epic poem and opera
- Bombastes Furioso, an opera
