= Cynaeda fuscinervis =

Scientific classification
- Kingdom: Animalia
- Phylum: Arthropoda
- Class: Insecta
- Order: Lepidoptera
- Family: Crambidae
- Genus: Cynaeda
- Species: C. fuscinervis

Binomial name
- Cynaeda fuscinervis (Hampson, 1896)

Synonyms
- Noctuelia fuscinervis Hampson, 1896

Species of moth

Cynaeda fuscinervis is a moth in the family Crambidae. It was described by George Hampson in 1896. It is found in India.
