= Fury (DJ) =

American DJ and professional snowboarder

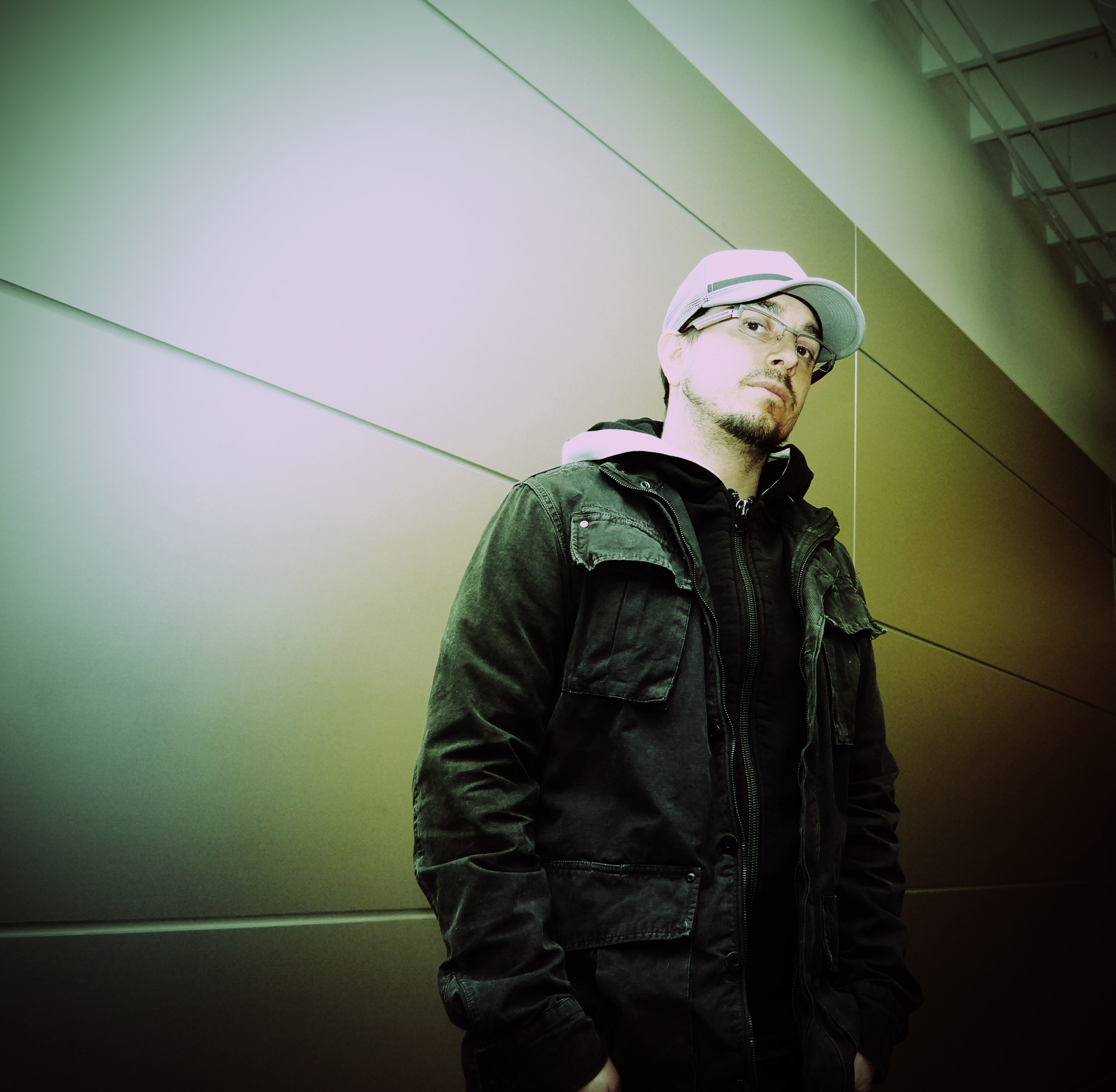

Background information
- Also known as: DJ Fury, Fury
- Born: Stephen Blakley; Rochester, New York
- Origin: Denver, Colorado
- Genres: Drum and bass, hardcore techno, jungle, breakbeat
- Occupations: Rave and event promoter, DJ, producer, graphic designer, former professional snowboarder
- Instruments: Drums, turntables
- Years active: 1992–present
- Website: furyjungle.com

Steve Blakley (born Rochester, New York), also known by his alias Fury (formerly DJ Fury) is an American DJ, rave promoter, and former professional snowboarder based in Denver, Colorado. In the 1980s and 1990s he was sponsored by Barfoot and Division 23 as an athlete, traveling to international snowboarding expos and competing in contests such as the U.S. Snowboarding Open. He began DJing as DJ Fury in 1992, adopting the styles of hardcore techno, drum and bass, breakbeat, and jungle. In 2000 the publication Denver Westword called him "Denver's premier jungle DJ." He tours frequently to festivals such as Electric Daisy Carnival, Paradiso, and Electric Forest Festival, often in collaboration with MC Dino, and as of 2014 is a resident DJ for Reload Productions, Beta Nightclub & Bassrush.

In the 1990s Blakley began promoting raves in Colorado and started LowerWorld Productions, co-founding rave series such as Skylab and Breakdown. He also co-founded the popular Rewind and Reload series, which are devoted to the drum and bass scene. According to Denver Westword, as of 2000 both events "pull in as many as 1,400 attendees... and have helped establish Denver and Boulder as the seat of one of the nation's most active rave cultures." Today regular Reload events continue in Denver, and Blakley continues to organize the weekly event series Bassic Fridays. Blakley is president of The Firm Graphics, a graphic design company that primarily caters to festival-style electronic music events.

== Early life ==
Stephen "Steve" Blakley was born and raised in Rochester, New York. At an early age he began learning piano, and after developing an interest in the city's straight-edge punk scene, particularly hardcore punk, convinced his mom to let him take up drumming.

In his early teens Blakley began to take his snowboarding hobby seriously. Since he was too young at the time for official certification, at age fourteen he became an unofficial snowboard instructor at Swain Ski Area in upstate New York. Swain was one of the few places at the time that allowed snowboards on the trails. At the age of fourteen he also had his first athletics sponsorship, with the snowboard company Barfoot. Blakley spent the next several years competing in contests, among them the U.S. Snowboarding Open. At one point he competed in the slalom against Ross Rebagliati, who would later go on to win a gold in the 1998 Winter Olympics. Recollected Blakley, "He's like this 'racer guy,' all decked out in racing gear, and I'm in big ol' baggy pants with a shitty freestyle board. I'm like, 'I'm gonna beat your ass! I'm gonna whup you!' He was all serious, and I was joking about it. Well, he finished like thirty seconds ahead of me."

In the late 1980s Blakley played drums for a punk band named Betrayed, based in Rochester, New York. The band wasn't strictly straight-edge, though Blakley personally adopted the ethos early on. According to Denver Westword, with "Blakley essentially running the band, Betrayed became part of the vibrant, local straight-edge scene and achieved minor success in New York." The band shared stages with punk groups such as Snapcase and Burn. Betrayed also released one recording, a seven-inch vinyl record on Torrid Records. Though the record was sold in various punk record stores in the United States, according to Blakley the band never saw any money from the label. Just before the release of the vinyl, a seventeen-year-old Blakley moved to Colorado, with the band dissolving as a result.

== Career ==
=== 1990–92: Snowboarding, early DJing ===
While living in Colorado in the early 1990s Blakley worked as a professional snowboarder. According to Blakley, "When I first moved out here, there weren't many people making much money off snowboarding. Barfoot was paying me $300 a month, and that was cool back then." The year he moved to Colorado the company Division-23 Snowboards was started by a former Barfoot executive, and Blakley switched his sponsorship to the new company. He was given his first pro-model snowboard, and within two years was supporting himself entirely through snowboarding. Blakley has been involved with film as well, and in 1993 he both co-edited and produced the snowboarding documentary Seventh Year.

While snowboarding Blakley traveled worldwide, including Australia, New Zealand, Europe and Canada. In 1991 he attended his first rave while on a trip to Vancouver, British Columbia, and afterwards began attending every rave he could around Denver, Colorado. According to Blakley, he had first developed an interest in the rave scene after friends in New York told him about DJ Frankie Bones's Storm raves in Brooklyn. He quickly developed an interest in deejaying himself, buying his first turntables and learning to mix hardcore techno. He also bought a crate of records at a record store in Los Angeles, recollecting that "I didn't even know what the hell I was buying. I have a stack of shitty old house records because I didn't know what they were. All I wanted was the hard techno stuff, breakbeat techno, and I picked up anything that looked cool."

"As hardcore techno gradually evolved into jungle (with faster breakbeats and deeper, harder bass), Blakley became the first real jungle DJ in Denver."
— Denver Westword

While continuing to snowboard to support himself, in 1992 Blakley adopted the alias DJ Fury and began performing in the hardcore techno and U.K. breakbeat scene around Denver. His very first live performance was at a small venue on Santa Fe street in Denver. The event was one of the few times that DJ Derrick Daisey, or Vitamin D, played in the city. Daisey and Blakley formed a "casual partnership," and together they went on to release a couple of mix tapes together, as well as the DJ mix CD Vitamin D vs. Fury. By 1993 hardcore techno began evolving into the genre jungle, with Blakley adopting the style.

=== 1993–99: Rave promotions ===
Using funds he'd collected from snowboarding, in the early 1990s Blakley began working as a rave promoter in Denver and Boulder, Colorado. He founded LowerWorld Productions, his own production company, and soon began working with both Jason Bills and Come Together Productions on rave events. The team had a number of successful event series, notably the Skylab series. They also put on the 1994 Sands of Time event, which was broken up early by the Denver Police Department. According to Blakley about the event, "I had just gotten my board royalties, a check from Division-23 for $9,000, and I lost it all that night. It took me years to recover." Despite the setback, he continued to work with Jason Bills and they kept the Skylab events running consistently in Denver for years, with the series growing to become one of the largest regular raves in the city. He also started working with Eric Kozak, also known as DJ D.ecco, and began putting on the successful Rewind and Reload drum and bass raves in Colorado.

Blakley co-founded the Rewind series of events in 1995. Catering only to jungle music and operated by Blakley's LowerWorld, Rewind helped Blakley gain national exposure as a DJ. He soon began to focus less on snowboarding, and after moving his sponsorship from the now defunct Division-23 to Ignition Snowboards, began devoting himself entirely to music and music promotion. He soon had resident DJ positions with Together and LowerWorld in Denver, and was traveling to gigs around the country. During his touring he continued operating monthly events (now called Reload) in Denver.

=== 2000s: Breakdown series ===
Rewind and Reload led to Blakley and Eric Kozak being recruited in the summer of 1998 to found and operate Breakdown, a drum-and-bass-themed Thursday club night at The Snake Pit. As well as local DJs, Kozak and Blakley brought in well-known artists such as Andy C, Ed Rush and Dieselboy.

"In the eight years he's been spinning, Blakley has gradually become the most in-demand DJ in and around Denver – a scene that five years ago was meager at best. His series of Rewind and Reload jungle events, which [as of 2000] pull in as many as 1,400 attendees with each installment, are known to jungle enthusiasts all over the world and have helped establish Denver and Boulder as the seat of one of the nation's most active rave cultures."
— Denver Westword in 2000

According to Denver Westword, "Breakdown became the first 21-and-over all-drum-and-bass night in Denver. What began as just another weekly theme night soon morphed into a mecca for drum-and-bass culture in the States... soon it became known as the premier drum-and-bass night in the nation, with upwards of 300 people in attendance week after week." According to Blakley, "If you go back and look at the peak, probably 2000 to 2002, we were consistently pulling more people than anyone else in the country. It was cool, because everyone wanted to play Breakdown so bad that we'd get DJs who'd normally get like a million dollars to come and play for us for a lot less." Among the ravers that came to Breakdown on a regular basis was Sean Sabo, also known as DJ Sabotage. Sabo began guesting from time to time when Kozak and Blakley were mixing at the club.

Blakley and Kozak decided to end Breakdown in 2004 after a consistent six-year run, with Blakley explaining at the time that "The night has run its course. We want to end it while it's still a good night rather than watch it fade away, like most other nights do." The last event in July 2004 featured Ed Rush and Optical, as well as many of the local DJs who had played at the series in the past. After Breakdown ended, D.ecco, Sabotage and Blakely moved in August 2004 from the Snake Pit to the basement of the Church in Denver, starting a Thursday night drum and bass event.

=== 2010–14: Touring ===
Using both the aliases DJ Fury and Fury he has toured frequently since the 1990s, performing on both the east and west coasts of the United States into the 2000s and 2010s. Cities he has performed at regularly include Los Angeles, Washington D.C., Seattle, and San Francisco, among others. Blakley often performs in his home city of Denver as well. In July 2014 Blakley played at the Global Dance Festival, which he has played regularly along with festivals such as EDC Las Vegas, Paradiso, and Nocturnal Wonderland.

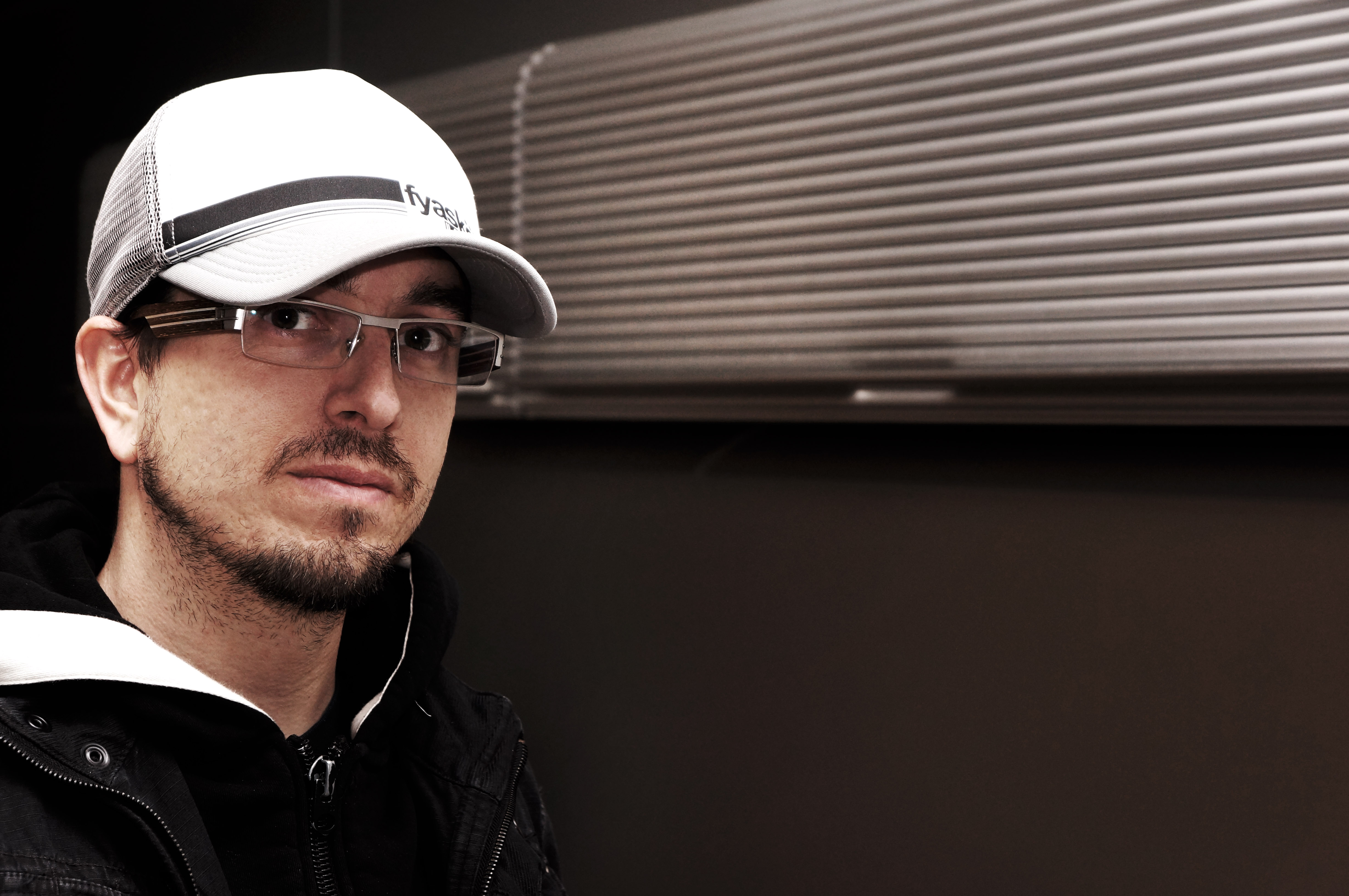
Fury in 2012

On tour Blakely is usually accompanied by MC Dino, a lyricist who has been emceeing in Colorado since 1997. MC Dino is also a seven-year resident of Breakdown Thursdays, a drum and bass club night operated by Blakley and held at the Snake Pit in Denver. Blakley and MC Dino have performed together at festivals such as the Electric Daisy Carnival in 2011 and Bassrush Massive, a week-long event held in Las Vegas in June 2013. Others include the 2014 Paradiso event and the June 2014 Electric Forest Festival held in Rothbury, Michigan. According to Travel Hymns, Blakley and MC Dino "deliver a natural pairing of hip hop tendencies with explosive drum and bass. With MC Dino serving as somewhat a hype man, the duo delivers kinetic live performances."

=== 2014: Recent projects ===
As of 2014 Blakley is a resident DJ for Reload, Beta Nightclub & Bassrush, the drum & bass division of Insomniac. Today regular Reload events continue in Denver, and Blakley continues to organize and co-host the weekly event at Beta Nightclub, entitled Bassic Fridays.

== The Firm Graphics ==
In 1997 Blakley's father bought him a Macintosh computer and Blakley began teaching himself graphic design. He soon teamed up with Brandon Kindred, also known as DJ Beekay, and they started publishing Static, a rave-oriented zine. The zine lasted three issues only, but it led to the Denver company Together hiring Blakley to design all of their rave fliers, which on average had 20,000 printings each. Afterwards Blakley was hired by other companies as well, designing for rave promoters and local hip-hop artists such as Dez and B-Rock. He named his new graphic design company The Firm, hiring two employees and setting up in office space in the downtown Denver neighborhood of LoDo.

Currently named The Firm Graphics, Blakley continues to serve as president. The company frequently does designs for large festival-style electronic music events, and clients have included Insomniac Events (who organize Electric Daisy Carnival and Beyond Wonderland), V2 Presents, USC Events and Beta Nightclub.

== Filmography ==
Production credits for Steve Blakley
Year	Release title	Artist(s)/Studio	Notes, role
1993	Seventh Year (documentary)	Torrid Productions	Producer, co-editor

== Discography ==
=== Mixtapes ===
The following is an incomplete list of mixtapes self-released by Fury:

- Vitamin D Vs. Fury (with Vitamin D)
- 2010: Reload2010
- 2011: Rewind3
- 2011: Flasbhack99
- 2012: Lowerworld Triple Pack
- 2012: Triple Pack 2000
- 2013: Late
- 2013: Get The Fuck Out of the House
- 2013: Old School
- 2013: Breakdown
- 2013: Loaded
- 2013: Bassic Mix
- 2013: Birth of the Denver Massive
- 2013: Late
- 2013: Ragga Jungle
- 2013: GoodCop Temp
- 2013: One Seventy Six

=== Singles ===
Incomplete list of songs by Fury
Year	Title	Album	Label
2001	"Corrupted" (with DJ Ecco ft. Sabotage)	Single; Only	Terraformat Records (TFFM005, US), 12"
2001	"Corrupted (Red One Remix)" (with DJ Ecco feat. Sabotage)	Single; Only	Terraformat Records (TFFM005, US), 12"

== See also ==
- Drum and bass
