= Cynaeda gigantea =

Scientific classification
- Kingdom: Animalia
- Phylum: Arthropoda
- Clade: Pancrustacea
- Class: Insecta
- Order: Lepidoptera
- Family: Crambidae
- Genus: Cynaeda
- Species: C. gigantea

Binomial name
- Cynaeda gigantea (Wocke, 1871)

Synonyms
- Odontia gigantea Wocke, 1871; Cynaeda gigantea hilariella Schawerda, 1921; Cynaeda gigantea mendicalis Lattin, 1951

Species of moth

Cynaeda gigantea is a species of moth in the family Crambidae. It is found in France, Switzerland, Croatia, Bosnia and Herzegovina, Hungary, Romania, the Republic of Macedonia, Greece and Turkey.

The larvae feed Anchusa and Onosma species. They mine the leaves of their host plant.
