= Cynaeda albidalis =

Scientific classification
- Kingdom: Animalia
- Phylum: Arthropoda
- Class: Insecta
- Order: Lepidoptera
- Family: Crambidae
- Genus: Cynaeda
- Species: C. albidalis

Binomial name
- Cynaeda albidalis (Hampson, 1913)

Synonyms
- Noctuelia albidalis Hampson, 1913

Species of moth

Cynaeda albidalis is a moth in the family Crambidae. It was described by George Hampson in 1913. It is found in Iraq.

The wingspan is about 20 mm. The forewings are white, the costal area faintly tinged with brown up to the postmedial line. The postmedial line is represented by an oblique rufous line, followed by a faint line with a few dark scales. There is a rufous subterminal line, as well as a fine black terminal line. The terminal area of the hindwings is tinged with brown and there is a fine black terminal line.
