= Cynaeda annuliferalis =

Scientific classification
- Kingdom: Animalia
- Phylum: Arthropoda
- Class: Insecta
- Order: Lepidoptera
- Family: Crambidae
- Genus: Cynaeda
- Species: C. annuliferalis

Binomial name
- Cynaeda annuliferalis (Hampson, 1913)

Synonyms
- Noctuelia annuliferalis Hampson, 1913; Noctuelia annuliferalis var. quinquealis Gaede, 1917

Species of moth

Cynaeda annuliferalis is a moth in the family Crambidae. It was described by George Hampson in 1913. It is found in Lesotho, Namibia, South Africa and Tanzania.
