= Cynaeda alticolalis =

Scientific classification
- Domain: Eukaryota
- Kingdom: Animalia
- Phylum: Arthropoda
- Class: Insecta
- Order: Lepidoptera
- Family: Crambidae
- Genus: Cynaeda
- Species: C. alticolalis

Binomial name
- Cynaeda alticolalis (Christoph, 1877)

Synonyms
- Noctuelia alticolalis Christoph, 1877

Species of moth

Cynaeda alticolalis is a moth in the family Crambidae. It was described by Hugo Theodor Christoph in 1877 and is found in Iran.
