= Furies (disambiguation) =

The Furies (Erinyes) are the deities of vengeance in Greek mythology.

Furies may also refer to:

== Film and television ==
- The Furies (1930 film), a murder mystery
- The Furies, a film montage by Slavko Vorkapić which opened the 1934 film Crime Without Passion
- The Furies (1950 film), a Western by Anthony Mann
- Furies (1977 film), an animated short film by Sara Petty
- The Furies (2016 film), a Spanish film
- Furies (2022 film), a Vietnamese film
- The Furies (2025 film), a Canadian sports comedy film
- Furies (TV series), a French action drama television series
- Furies (2026 film), an Arabic drama film

== Print media ==
- The Furys, a 1935 novel by James Hanley, see The Furys Chronicle
- "The Furies", a short story in the 1954 collection Appleby Talking by Michael Innes
- "The Furies", a 1965 science fiction novelette by Roger Zelazny
- The Furies (Roberts novel), a 1966 science fiction novel by Keith Roberts
- The Furies (Jakes novel), a 1976 historical novel by John Jakes
- The Furies, a 2009 historical novel by Bill Napier
- The Furies, a 2023 novel by Mandy Beaumont
- The Furies, a newspaper of The Furies Collective, a Washington DC–based lesbian organization

== Characters ==
- Erinyes (Dungeons & Dragons), a devil in the Dungeons & Dragons role-playing game
- Furies (Shannara), characters in the Shannara book series by Terry Brooks
- The Furies, characters in the Codex Alera book series by Jim Butcher

== Other ==
- The Furies (band), an American indie rock band
- The Eumenides, or The Furies, a play by Aeschylus

== See also ==
- Female Furies, a group of women warriors in DC Comics
- The Furys (disambiguation)
- The Fureys, Irish folk band
- Fury (disambiguation)
