= Warfare Machines =

Studio album by Deinonychus
- Released: 2007
- Recorded: 2006 2007 Roma-Italy
- Genre: Black/doom; Death/doom
- Length: 33:13
- Label: My Kingdom Music

Deinonychus chronology
Insomnia (2003)	Warfare Machines (2007)	Re-Issues Ark of Thought-Mournument-Insomnia-Warfare Machines-Amphetamine Machine 2010 (2010)

Warfare Machines is the last Deinonychus album made, after the band disbanded in September 2008. It was released by My Kingdom Music.

== Track listing ==
- All songs written by Marco Kehren.
1. Krematorium 03:06
2. Carpet Bombing 03:23
3. Manoeuvre East 04:16
4. NaPola 04:45
5. MG-34 04:11
6. False Flag 05:25
7. Nerve Agent 04:56
8. Morphium 03:11

== Personnel ==
- Marco Kehren: Guitars, Vocals
- Jürgen Bartsch: Bass
- Giuseppe Orlando: Drums, Percussion

== Artwork and layout ==
- Eric Massicotte
