= Cynaeda globuliferalis =

Scientific classification
- Kingdom: Animalia
- Phylum: Arthropoda
- Class: Insecta
- Order: Lepidoptera
- Family: Crambidae
- Genus: Cynaeda
- Species: C. globuliferalis

Binomial name
- Cynaeda globuliferalis (Hampson in Poulton, 1916)

Synonyms
- Noctuelia globuliferalis Hampson in Poulton, 1916

Species of moth

Cynaeda globuliferalis is a moth in the family Crambidae. It was described by George Hampson in 1916. It is found in Kenya.
