= Cynaeda togoalis =

Scientific classification
- Kingdom: Animalia
- Phylum: Arthropoda
- Clade: Pancrustacea
- Class: Insecta
- Order: Lepidoptera
- Family: Crambidae
- Genus: Cynaeda
- Species: C. togoalis

Binomial name
- Cynaeda togoalis (Karsch, 1900)

Synonyms
- Noctuelia togoalis Karsch, 1900

Species of moth

Cynaeda togoalis is a moth in the family Crambidae. It was described by Ferdinand Karsch in 1900. It is found in Togo.
