= Cynaeda rebeli =

Scientific classification
- Domain: Eukaryota
- Kingdom: Animalia
- Phylum: Arthropoda
- Class: Insecta
- Order: Lepidoptera
- Family: Crambidae
- Genus: Cynaeda
- Species: C. rebeli

Binomial name
- Cynaeda rebeli (Amsel, 1935)

Synonyms
- Noctuelia rebeli Amsel, 1935

Species of moth

Cynaeda rebeli is a moth in the family Crambidae. It was described by Hans Georg Amsel in 1935. It is found in the Palestinian territories.
