= Cynaeda hilgerti =

Scientific classification
- Domain: Eukaryota
- Kingdom: Animalia
- Phylum: Arthropoda
- Class: Insecta
- Order: Lepidoptera
- Family: Crambidae
- Genus: Cynaeda
- Species: C. hilgerti

Binomial name
- Cynaeda hilgerti (Rothschild, 1915)

Synonyms
- Noctuelia hilgerti Rothschild, 1915

Species of moth

Cynaeda hilgerti is a moth in the family Crambidae. It was described by Rothschild in 1915. It is found in Algeria.

The wingspan is 19–23 mm. The forewings are sandy buff, suffused with white in the central one-third. There is an antemedian brown band and a discocellular black stigma, as well as a postmedial band of black spots and a black terminal line. The hindwings are buff with a brown postmedian line and a black-brown terminal line. Adults have been recorded on wing in April.
