= Cynaeda puralis =

Scientific classification
- Kingdom: Animalia
- Phylum: Arthropoda
- Clade: Pancrustacea
- Class: Insecta
- Order: Lepidoptera
- Family: Crambidae
- Genus: Cynaeda
- Species: C. puralis

Binomial name
- Cynaeda puralis (Gaede, 1917)

Synonyms
- Noctuelia puralis Gaede, 1917

Species of moth

Cynaeda puralis is a moth in the family Crambidae. It was described by Max Gaede in 1917. It is found in Tanzania.
