= Furia =

Furia may refer to:

- Furia gens, an ancient Roman family
- Furia (album), of 1999 by Brian May
- Furia (film), a 1999 French romantic drama film
- Furia (band), a Polish black metal band
- Fury (1947 film), an Italian film with the original title Furia
- The Rage (2002 film), a Romanian film with the original title Furia
- Erinyes (mythology), female chthonic deities of vengeance in ancient Greek religion and mythology also known as the Furies
- Furia (novel), a 2020 YA Contemporary novel
- Furia Esports, a Brazilian esports organization
- A1-CM Furia, a Ukrainian unmanned aerial vehicle
- Furia (fungus), genus of fungi in the Entomophthoraceae family
- La Furia, a French satire magazine
- Vishal Furia, Indian film director, including Bali (2021 film)

== See also ==
- Fury (disambiguation)
