= Cynaeda yaminalis =

Scientific classification
- Domain: Eukaryota
- Kingdom: Animalia
- Phylum: Arthropoda
- Class: Insecta
- Order: Lepidoptera
- Family: Crambidae
- Genus: Cynaeda
- Species: C. yaminalis

Binomial name
- Cynaeda yaminalis (Oberthür, 1888)

Synonyms
- Aporodes yaminalis Oberthür, 1888

Species of moth

Cynaeda yaminalis is a moth in the family Crambidae. It was described by Oberthür in 1888. It is found in Algeria.
