= Cynaeda seriziati =

Scientific classification
- Domain: Eukaryota
- Kingdom: Animalia
- Phylum: Arthropoda
- Class: Insecta
- Order: Lepidoptera
- Family: Crambidae
- Genus: Cynaeda
- Species: C. seriziati

Binomial name
- Cynaeda seriziati (Staudinger, 1892)

Synonyms
- Eurycreon seriziati Staudinger, 1892

Species of moth

Cynaeda seriziati is a moth in the family Crambidae. It was described by Staudinger in 1892. It is found in Algeria.
