= Cynaeda mardinalis =

Scientific classification
- Domain: Eukaryota
- Kingdom: Animalia
- Phylum: Arthropoda
- Class: Insecta
- Order: Lepidoptera
- Family: Crambidae
- Genus: Cynaeda
- Species: C. mardinalis

Binomial name
- Cynaeda mardinalis (Staudinger, 1892)

Synonyms
- Noctuelia mardinalis Staudinger, 1892

Species of moth

Cynaeda mardinalis is a moth in the family Crambidae. It was described by Staudinger in 1892. It is found in Kurdistan.
