= Darkened Nocturn Slaughtercult =

German black metal band

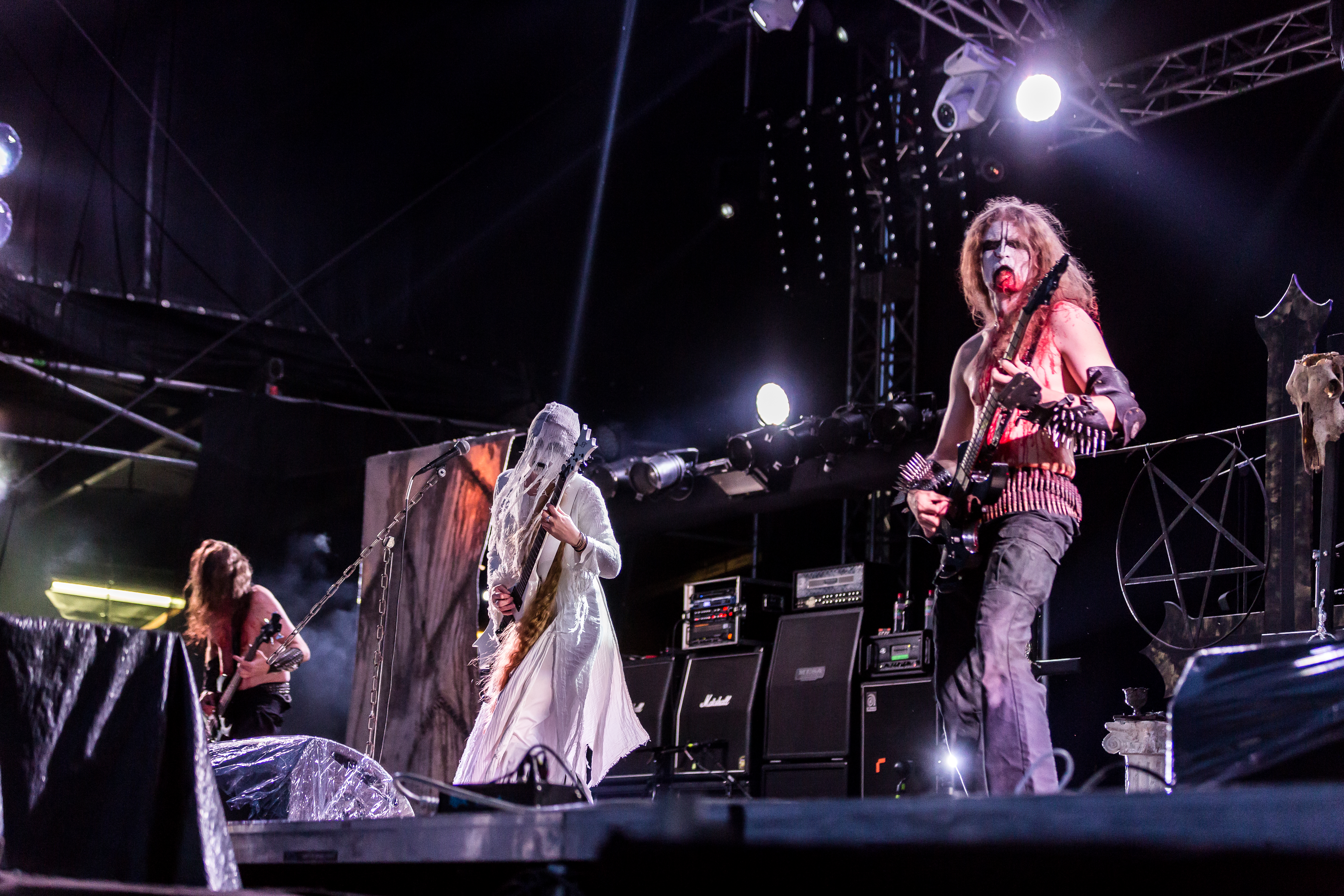
- Darkened Nocturn Slaughtercult in 2017

Background information
- Origin: Germany
- Genre: Black metal
- Years active: 1997–present
- Label: War Anthem Records
- Members: Onielar; Velnias; Horrn; R. K.
- Website: slaughtercult.de

Darkened Nocturn Slaughtercult is a German black metal band from Dormagen, formed in 1997. In November 2021, lead singer Onielar revealed she had been diagnosed with an aggressive form of breast cancer and needed to undergo a double mastectomy and chemotherapy. She has since made a full recovery.

== Musical style ==
Darkened Nocturn Slaughtercult is considered a traditional black metal band, and has stated, "we are very much influenced by the Norwegian black metal bands. Bands like Gorgoroth, Enslaved, Satyricon, Immortal, Darkthrone. I listened to this music a lot. Most people say our music reminds them of those bands. They think we fit in the vein of old school black metal. Nevertheless, the greatest influence for music is occultism." Their sound has been described as "very raw".

== Members ==
=== Current members ===
- Onielar (Yvonne Wilczynska) – vocals, rhythm guitar (1997–present)
- Velnias (Sven Galinsky) – lead guitar (1997–present)
- Horrn (Michael Pelkowsky) – drums, percussion (2000–present)
- R. K. (René Kögel) – bass (2019–present)

=== Former members ===
- Ariovist – drums, percussion (1997–1999)
- Grigorr – bass (1997–2001; 2007–2009)
- Emporonorr – bass (2002–2006)
- Adversarius (Tobias Lachmann) – bass (2010–2019)

=== Live members ===
- Necropest – bass (2006–2007)
- Thymos – bass (2009–2010)

== Discography ==
- The Pest Called Humanity / Pyre – Luciferian Dark Age (split album, 1999)
- Follow the Calls for Battle (2001)
- Underneath Stars of the East / Emptyness (split album, 2003)
- Nocturnal March (2004)
- Hora Nocturna (2006)
- Evoking a Decade (collector's edition, double MCD, 2008)
- Saldorian Spell (2009)
- Legion of Chaos (split LP with Purgatory)
- Necrovision (2013)
- Darkened Bižuterija (split LP with Jelena Rozga, 2015)
- Mardom (2019)
