= Furioso (album) =

Studio album by Pavor
- Released: 2003
- Recorded: 2002–2003, BGM Tonstudio, Bad Honnef
- Genre: Technical death metal
- Length: 51:56
- Label: Imperator Music (independently released)
- Producer: Rainer Landfermann and Armin Rave

Pavor chronology
A Pale Debilitating Autumn (1994)	Furioso (2003)

Furioso is the second studio album by the heavy metal band Pavor. It was released in 2003 on Imperator Music.

== Track listing ==
- All music by Pavor. All lyrics as noted.
1. Inflictor Of Grimness - 9:31 (Armin Rave)
2. Perplexer: Perdition Projectile - 5:52 (Rainer Landfermann)
3. Wroth Volcanic Vent - 5:32 (Landfermann)
4. Furioso - 6:22 (Landfermann)
5. A Schizoid Uglifier - 6:16 (Landermann)
6. Crucified Hopes - 7:04 (Rave)
7. Inconsistent ClayBlood Totemist - 8:31 (Landfermann)
8. Dilettante's Dilemma - 2:48 (Landfermann)

== Personnel ==
- Claudius Schwartz: Vocals
- Armin Rave: Guitars
- Rainer Landfermann: Bass
- Michael Pelkowsky: Drums, percussion

== Production ==
- Produced, recorded, mixed and mastered by Armin Rave and Rainer Landfermann
