= HMS Fury (1794) =

History

Great Britain
- Name: HMS Fury
- Acquired: 3 February 1794 (by purchase)
- Commissioned: March 1794
- Fate: Sold May 1802

General characteristics
- Type: Hoy
- Tons burthen: 55, or 56 (bm)
- Length: 57 ft 10 in (17.6 m) (overall); 50 ft 2 1/2 in (15.3 m) (keel)
- Beam: 14 ft 6 in (4.4 m)
- Depth of hold: 5 ft 4 in (1.63 m)
- Propulsion: Sails
- Sail plan: sloop
- Complement: 30
- Armament: 1 × 24-pounder gun + 3 × 32-pounder carronades

HMS Ferret was a Dutch hoy of the same name that the Admiralty purchased in 1794 for use as a gun-boat. It sold her in May 1802.

== Career ==
Fury underwent fitting at Deptford in March–April 1794. Lieutenant Joseph Tokely commissioned her in March 1794.Lieutenant Francis Fraser replaced Tokely in May 1795. Fury was paid off in February 1796, but Lieutenant David Burn recommissioned her in September.

On 13 July 1797 Fury brought in to Portsmouth an open boat French privateer, of 14 men. The privateer had grounded on the Shingles at the entrance to the Channel while in chase of the Cowes pilot boat. The master of the privateer had already been captured nine times before.

On 10 August Fury captured the French privateer Invisible.

Lieutenant A. Everell replaced Burn in January 1799 (acting). Lieutenant John Roberts commanded Fury from 1800.

Fury was one of five vessels that shared in the proceeds of the capture on 13 March 1801 of the French vessel Cosmopolite.

== Fate ==
The "Principal Officers and Commissioners of His Majesty's Navy" offered "Fury gun-vessel, 55 Tons, lying at Portsmouth", for sale on 12 May 1802. She sold at Portsmouth in May.
