= Pavor =

German technical death metal band

- Origin: Bonn, Rheinland, Germany
- Genre: Technical death metal
- Years active: 1987–present
- Label: Independent Artist
- Members: Rainer Landfermann; Michael Pelkowsky; Armin Rave; Claudius Schwartz
- Past members: Holger Seebens

Pavor is a German technical death metal band formed in 1987. The band has released two albums in an independent twenty-year career.

== Biography ==
Guitarists Armin Rave and Holger Seebens founded Pavor in 1987 near Bonn, Germany. Efforts to be more professional led to changes in the early line-up. Michael Pelkowsky (drums), Rainer Landfermann (bass), and Claudius Schwartz (vocals) became regular members.

The band's desire for quality resulted in the delay of a first official release. During the winter of 1992/1993, they recorded and released a 28-minute, untitled EP, which sold out and is out of print. After a year of composing and performing, Pavor re-entered the studio during May/June/July 1994 to record their first full-length album, A Pale Debilitating Autumn. Shortly after the album's release, guitarist Holger Seebens left the band. Pavor continued as a four-piece.

During 1995 and 1996, Pavor promoted the album with interviews and shows, and started preparing for the next album. Organizational issues caused led to a partial withdrawal from public relations and the public in subsequent years. The band made brief appearances in the media. In February 2000, German metal magazine RockHard featured Pavor with an interview and the track "Perplexer: Perdition Projectile" on its annual "best unsigned acts" compilation "Unerhört!". In June 2000, Pavor won the underground-contest held by Heavy Oder Was?! magazine, and played the Bang Your Head Festival in Balingen, Germany, as a result.

In 2003, Pavor finished recording their second album, Furioso. The eight-song album includes a re-recorded version of their 1989 classic "Crucified Hopes.".

== Members ==
=== Current members ===
- Rainer Landfermann - bass
- Michael Pelkowsky - drums
- Armin Rave - guitar
- Claudius Schwartz - vocals

=== Past members ===
- Holger Seebens - guitar (1987–1994)

== Discography ==
- Catharsis (Demo, 1993)
- Pavor (Demo, 1993)
- A Pale Debilitating Autumn (Album, 1994)
- Furioso (Album, 2003)
