= Furious =

Furious may refer to:

- Rage (emotion)

== Arts and entertainment ==
- Furious (album), by Soopa Villainz, 2005
- "Furious", a song by Joan as Police Woman from the 2008 album To Survive
- "Furious", a song by Ja Rule from The Fast and the Furious (soundtrack), 2002
- Furious (play), by Michael Gow, 1991
- Furious (film), or Legend of Kolovrat, a Russian historical fantasy action film
- Fast & Furious, or The Fast and the Furious, an American crime action adventure films media franchise
- The Furious, a 2025 Hong Kong action film
- Furious (TV series), a 2026 American crime drama television series

== Other uses ==
- HMS Furious, the name of several Royal Navy ships

== See also ==
- Fury (disambiguation)
- Furiosa (disambiguation)
- Furioso (disambiguation)
- Furio (disambiguation)
