= John Furie =

English footballer

Personal information
- Full name: John Patrick Christopher Furie
- Date of birth: 13 May 1948 (age 78)
- Place of birth: Hammersmith, England
- Position: Right-back

Youth career
- Watford

Senior career*
Years	Team	Apps	(Gls)
1966–1967	Watford	1	(0)
1967–1968	Gillingham	17	(0)
- Chelmsford City
- Guildford City
1971–1972	Wealdstone	74	(1)
- Oxhey Jets

Managerial career
- Sun Sports
- 1986–1987: Oxhey Jets
- * Club domestic league appearances and goals

John Patrick Christopher Furie (born 13 May 1948) was an English professional footballer of the 1960s. He played in the Football League for Gillingham, making 17 appearances.
