= Furio (surname) =

Furio is a surname of Italian origin.

Notable persons with that name include:

- Sonia Furió (1937–1996), Mexican actress
- Carlos Furió Más (born c. 1970), (fl. 2000), Spanish research psychologist
- Dominic Furio (born 1981), American football player

== See also ==
- Furio (given name)
- Iván Furios
