= Cohl Furey =

Canadian mathematician and physicist

- Born: Nichol Furey; Canada
- Occupations: Physicist, mathematician
- Known for: Application of octonions to the Standard Model

Academic background
- Education: Simon Fraser University (2005, B.S.); University of Cambridge (2006, M.S.)
- Alma mater: University of Waterloo (2015, Ph.D.)
- Thesis: Standard model physics from an algebra? (2015)
- Doctoral advisor: Achim Kempf

Academic work
- Discipline: Mathematical physics
- Main interests: Particle physics, division algebras, Clifford algebras, Jordan algebras, octonions
- Website: www.furey.space

Cohl Furey, also known as Nichol Furey, is a Canadian mathematical physicist. She is known for her work on octonions as applied to the Standard Model.

== Career ==
Furey has a bachelor's degree in mathematics and physics from Simon Fraser University (2005), Master's degree from the University of Cambridge (2006) and a Ph.D in theoretical physics from the University of Waterloo (2015). She was a research fellow at the University of Cambridge's Trinity Hall from 2016 to 2019 and spent a few months at the African Institute for Mathematical Sciences in Cape Town. Since 2020, she has been at the Humboldt University of Berlin on a Freigeist Fellowship by the Volkswagen Foundation.

Her main interests are division algebras, Clifford algebras, and Jordan algebras, and their relation to particle physics. Her work focuses on finding an underlying mathematical structure to the Standard Model of particle physics. She is most noted for her work on octonions.

She has worked on attempting to obtain the Standard Model of particle physics from octonionic constructions. In her 2018 paper "SU(3)_{C} × SU(2)_{L} × U(1)_{Y} (× U(1)_{X}) as a symmetry of division algebraic ladder operators," according to Quanta Magazine, "she consolidated several findings to construct the full Standard Model symmetry group, SU(3) × SU(2) × U(1), for a single generation of particles, with the math producing the correct array of electric charges and other attributes for an electron, neutrino, three up quarks, three down quarks and their anti-particles. The math also suggests a reason why electric charge is quantized in discrete units — essentially, because whole numbers are." In 2022 together with Mia Hughes, she linked the symmetry breaking in physics to division algebras including octonions.

== Media recognition ==
In 2019, Wired.com listed her in their article "10 Women in Science and Tech Who Should Be Household Names".

== Notable publications ==
- Furey, Nichol; Hughes, Mia J. (2022-08-10). "Division algebraic symmetry breaking". Physics Letters B. 831 137186. arXiv:2210.10126. Bibcode:2022PhLB..83137186F. doi:10.1016/j.physletb.2022.137186. ISSN 0370-2693.
- C. Furey, "Three generations, two unbroken gauge symmetries, and one eight-dimensional algebra", Phys. Lett. B, 785 (2018) p. 84-89 (See addendum, arXiv version
- C. Furey, "SU(3)_{C} × SU(2)_{L} × U(1)_{Y} (× U(1)_{X}) as a symmetry of division algebraic ladder operators", Eur. Phys. J. C, 78 5 (2018) 375
- C. Furey, "A demonstration that electroweak theory could violate parity automatically (leptonic case)", Int. J. Mod. Phys. A, (2018)
- C. Furey, "Standard model physics from an algebra?", PhD thesis, University of Waterloo, [arXiv:1611.09182]
- C. Furey, "Charge quantization from a number operator", Phys. Lett. B, 742 (2015), pp. 195–199
- C. Furey, "Generations: Three prints, in colour", JHEP 10 (2014) 046 [arXiv:1405.4601 hep-th]
- C. Furey, "Towards a unified theory of ideals", Phys. Rev. D 86 (2012) 025024, [arXiv:1002.1497 hep-th]
- Furey, DeBenedictis, "Wormhole throats in R^{m} gravity", Class. Quantum Grav. 22 (2005) 313–322, [arXiv:gr-qc/0410088]
