= The Weeping of a Thousand Years =

Studio album by Deinonychus
- Released: 1996
- Recorded: 1996
- Genre: Black/doom; Death/doom
- Length: 60:03
- Label: Cacophonous Records

Deinonychus chronology
Warfare Machines (2007)	The Weeping of a Thousand Years (1996)	Ark of Thought (1997)

The Weeping of a Thousand Years is the second full-length album by Deinonychus. It was released in July 1996 on Cacophonous Records.

== Track list ==
No.	Title	Length
1.	"The Romantic Sounds of Death"	6:32
2.	"A Gathering of Memories"	7:10
3.	"Upon the Highlands I Fought"	7:20
4.	"A Last Lament"	7:11
5.	"I Have Done as You Did"	7:09
6.	"Lost Forever"	7:11
7.	"The Awakened"	12:33
8.	"The Gothic Statue"	8:22
