= Fury: Original Motion Picture Soundtrack =

2014 soundtrack album

Soundtrack album by Steven Price
- Released: October 14, 2014
- Recorded: 2013–2014
- Genre: Soundtrack
- Length: 1:06:55
- Label: Varèse Sarabande

Professional ratings
Review scores
Source	Rating
Movie Wave	4.5/5 stars
Soundtrack Geek	9.26/10
Synchrotones Soundtrack Reviews	4/5 stars
Soundtrack Dreams	8.4/10

Fury: Original Motion Picture Soundtrack is the original soundtrack of the 2014 film Fury, composed by Steven Price.

== Track listing ==
All music is composed by Steven Price.

Fury (Original Motion Picture Soundtrack)
No.	Title	Length
1.	"April, 1945"	04:14
2.	"The War Is Not Over"	01:47
3.	"Fury Drives Into Camp"	01:50
4.	"Refugees"	02:42
5.	"Ambush"	02:08
6.	"The Beetfield"	07:59
7.	"Airfight"	03:04
8.	"The Town Square"	02:17
9.	"The Apartment"	00:58
10.	"Emma"	02:35
11.	"Tiger Battle"	06:17
12.	"On The Lookout"	03:04
13.	"This Is My Home"	03:43
14.	"Machine"	03:21
15.	"Crossroads"	08:06
16.	"Still In This Fight"	03:39
17.	"I'm Scared Too"	03:45
18.	"Wardaddy"	02:39
19.	"Norman"	02:50

== Development ==
On November 19, 2013 composer Steven Price signed on to score the film. Varèse Sarabande revealed the details of the soundtrack album of the film on September 16, and released the original soundtrack album for the film on October 14, 2014.
