= Cynaeda furiosa =

Scientific classification
- Kingdom: Animalia
- Phylum: Arthropoda
- Class: Insecta
- Order: Lepidoptera
- Family: Crambidae
- Genus: Cynaeda
- Species: C. furiosa

Binomial name
- Cynaeda furiosa Hampson, 1900

Species of moth

Cynaeda furiosa is a moth in the family Crambidae. It was described by George Hampson in 1900. It is found in Central Asia and Iran.

== Subspecies ==
- Cynaeda furiosa furiosa
- Cynaeda furiosa amseli Lattin, 1959 (Iran)
