= Cynaeda allardalis =

Scientific classification
- Domain: Eukaryota
- Kingdom: Animalia
- Phylum: Arthropoda
- Class: Insecta
- Order: Lepidoptera
- Family: Crambidae
- Genus: Cynaeda
- Species: C. allardalis

Binomial name
- Cynaeda allardalis (Oberthür, 1876)

Synonyms
- Orobena allardalis Oberthür, 1876

Species of moth

Cynaeda allardalis is a moth in the family Crambidae. It was described by Oberthür in 1876. It is found in Algeria.
