= George Barfoot =

English cricketer

Domestic team information
- Years: Team
- 1842–1845: Hampshire

Career statistics
Competition	FC
Matches	7
Runs scored	44
Batting average	3.66
100s/50s	–/–
Top score	16
Balls bowled	8
Wickets	1
Bowling average	5.00
5 wickets in innings	–
10 wickets in match	–
Best bowling	1/5
Catches/stumpings	3/–
- Source: Cricinfo, 15 February 2010

George Barfoot (6 November 1812 at Twyford, Hampshire – 1889 at Winchester, Hampshire) was an English first-class cricketer who represented Hampshire, making his debut in 1842 against Marylebone Cricket Club (MCC).

The following season Barfoot played three further first-class matches for Hampshire, twice against Nottinghamshire and once against the Marylebone Cricket Club.

Barfoot followed this up with a single first-class match for Hampshire in 1844 against the Marylebone Cricket Club and played the same opposition for the final time in 1845. In 1845 Barfoot played his final first-class match for Hampshire against Petworth Cricket Club. In his career Barfoot scored 44 runs at a batting average of 3.66 and took a single wicket for the cost of 5 runs.

Barfoot died at Winchester, Hampshire in 1889.
