= USS Fury =

USS Fury may refer to the following ships of the United States Navy:

- USS Fury (1869), the former Umpqua, only held the name for a few months in 1869
- USS Fury (PG-69), Flower-class corvette, was commissioned 17 March 1942 and decommissioned 22 August 1945
