= Furey =

Furey is a surname. Notable people with the surname include:

- Andrew Furey (born 1975), 14th Premier of Newfoundland and Labrador
- Barney Furey (1886–1938), American actor
- Clara Furey (born 1983), Canadian multidisciplinary artist
- Cohl Furey (fl. 2005), Canadian mathematical physicist
- Chuck Furey (born 1954), Canadian politician from Newfoundland and Labrador
- Dick Furey (1925–1998), American professional basketball player
- Finbar Furey (born 1946), Irish folk musician
- George Furey (born 1948), Canadian politician from Newfoundland and Labrador
- Joe Furey (fl. 1992), American comedian
- John Furey (born 1951), American actor
- John F. Furey (1906–1973), American politician and judge from New York
- Kevin Furey (born 1983), American politician from Montana
- Kirk Furey (born 1976), Canadian ice hockey player
- Lewis Furey (born 1949), Canadian musician
- Maggie Furey (1955–2016), English fantasy writer
- Sean Furey (born 1982), American athlete

== See also ==
- The Fureys, an Irish folk band
- J. P. O'Furey (1876–1937), American politician and newspaper publisher from Nebraska
