= Furio (given name) =

Furio is a given name of Italian origin (and derived from Latin Furius meaning "furious").

Notable persons and fictional figures with that name include:

== People ==
- Furio Bordon (born c. 1970), Italian playwright
- Marcus Furius Camillus, also known as Marco Furio Camillo (c. 446–365 BCE), Roman general
- Furio Colombo (1931–2025), Italian journalist and politician, editor-in-chief of L'Unità
- Furio Niclot Doglio (1908–1942), Italian test pilot and World War II ace
- Furio Fusi (born 1947), Italian sprinter
- Furio Nordio (fl. 1960s), Italian bobsledder
- Furio Piccirilli (1869–1949) American sculptor
- Furio Radin (fl. since 1990s), Croatian legislator
- Jacopo Furio Sarno (born 1989), Italian actor
- Furio Scarpelli (1919–2010), Italian screenwriter

== Fictional or fictionalized characters ==
- Furio, in the Italian film The White Sheik (1952)
- Titular characters of operas, Furio Camillo, about Marcus Furius Camillus:
  - Furio Camillo (Pacini) (1839), by Giovanni Pacini
  - Furio Camillo (Perti) (1692), by Giacomo Antonio Perti
- Furio Derek, villain in Power Rangers Lost Galaxy (1999)
- Furio Giunta, Italian gangster in The Sopranos (2000–02)
- Furio Tigre, witness to a murder in Ace Attorney (2009)

== See also ==
- Furio (surname)
