= Michael Barfoot =

English cricketer

Personal information
- Full name: Michael Rod Barfoot
- Born: 18 July 1980 (age 46); Cheltenham, Gloucestershire, England
- Batting: Right-handed
- Bowling: Right-arm fast-medium

Domestic team information
- Years: Team
- 1999: Worcestershire Cricket Board

Career statistics
Competition	LA
Matches	1
Runs scored	–
Batting average	–
100s/50s	–/–
Top score	–
Balls bowled	18
Wickets	–
Bowling average	–
5 wickets in innings	–
10 wickets in match	–
Best bowling	–
Catches/stumpings	–/–
- Source: Cricinfo, 2 November 2010

Michael Rod Barfoot (born 18 July 1980) is a former English cricketer. Barfoot was a right-handed batsman who bowled right-arm fast-medium. He was born at Cheltenham, Gloucestershire.

Barfoot represented the Worcestershire Cricket Board in a single List A match against the Kent Cricket Board in the 1999 NatWest Trophy.
