= The Furys =

The Furys may refer to:

- The Furys (novel), 1935
- The Furys (doo-wop group), Jerome Evans & The Furys released singles 1962 - 1974
- The Furys (punk band), Los Angeles new wave band formed in the late 1970s

== See also ==
- The Fureys, Irish male folk band originally formed in 1976
