= List of war metal bands =

This is a list of war metal bands. War metal (also known as war black metal or bestial black metal) is an aggressive, cacophonous and chaotic subgenre of blackened death metal.

== List of bands ==
- Archgoat
- Axis of Perdition
- Bahimiron
- Beherit
- Bestial Warlust
- Black Witchery
- Blasphemy
- Blood Revolt
- Diocletian
- Goat Semen
- Impiety
- In Battle
- Nuclear Blaze
- Revenge
- Teitanblood
- Zyklon-B
