= Grimlord (disambiguation) =

Grimlord is a fictitious villain character in the show VR Troopers.

Grimlord may also refer to:

- Grimlord (band), Polish heavy metal band.
- Grimlord Necrotis, a band member of Army of in Between
- David "Grimlord" Herrera, a band member of Bahimiron

== See also ==
- Archibald Douglas, 3rd Earl of Douglas, known as Archibald the Grim
- Gremloids, alternative name for Hyperspace, a film written and directed by Todd Durham, and starring Chris Elliott and Paula Poundstone
