= Kingdom of Fear =

Kingdom of Fear may refer to:

- Kingdom of Fear (book), a 2003 book by Hunter S. Thompson
- Kingdom of Fear (Shitdisco album), 2007
- Kingdom of Fear (In Battle album), 2007
- "Kingdom of Fear" (song), by Cameron Whitcomb, 2026

== See also ==
- Empire of Fear: Inside the Islamic State
- Republic of Fear
