= Devouring Radiant Light =

Studio album by Skeletonwitch
- Released: July 20, 2018
- Recorded: January – February 2018
- Studio: GodCity Studios, Salem, Massachusetts
- Genre: Melodic black metal
- Length: 46:08
- Label: Prosthetic
- Producer: Kurt Ballou, Skeletonwitch

Skeletonwitch chronology
Serpents Unleashed (2013)	Devouring Radiant Light (2018)

Professional ratings
Aggregate scores
Source	Rating
Metacritic	83/100
Review scores
Source	Rating
MetalSucks	4.5/5 stars
Exclaim!	(9/10)

Devouring Radiant Light is the sixth studio album by American extreme metal band Skeletonwitch. It was released in July 2018 by Prosthetic Records.

== Track listing ==
No.	Title	Length
1.	"Fen of Shadows"	7:59
2.	"When Paradise Fades"	4:01
3.	"Temple of the Sun"	4:43
4.	"Devouring Radiant Light"	6:47
5.	"The Luminous Sky"	4:02
6.	"The Vault"	8:57
7.	"Carnarium Eternal"	3:00
8.	"Sacred Soil"	6:40
Total length:		46:08

== Personnel ==
Skeletonwitch

- Nate Garnette – lead guitar, backing vocals
- Scott Hedrick – rhythm guitar
- Evan Linger – bass
- Adam Clemans – vocals
- Dustin Boltjes – drums

Production

- Kurt Ballou – recording, production
- Fredrik Nordström – mixing
- Brad Boatright – mastering

Artwork

- Stéfan Thanneur – cover
- Branca Studio – layout
- Nico Paolillo – photography

== Accolades ==
Publication	Accolade	Rank	Ref.
Decibel	Decibel's Top 40 Albums of 2018	6	
Metal Injection	Top 20 Albums of 2018	19	
Pitchfork	Best Metal Albums of 2018	N/A	
PopMatters	Top 20 Metal Albums of 2018	18	
