= The Oath of Black Blood =

Compilation album by Beherit
- Released: September 1991
- Recorded: June–September 1990
- Genres: Black metal, war metal
- Length: 25:59
- Label: Turbo Music

Beherit chronology
The Oath of Black Blood (1991)	Drawing Down the Moon (1993)

The Oath of Black Blood is a compilation album by the Finnish black metal band Beherit. The album is not a separate recording, but a compilation of the band's demo Demonomancy and EP Dawn of Satan's Millennium. The material was recorded in late 1990 and released as an album in 1991 through Turbo Music, without Beherit's permission, after the band spent the recording budget on alcohol. Spikefarm Records re-released the album in 2005 in digipak format with different artwork.

== Track listing ==
1. "Intro" – 0:57
2. "Metal of Death" – 0:54
3. "The Oath of Black Blood" – 2:41
4. "Grave Desecration" – 2:02
5. "Witchcraft" – 3:13
6. "Goat Worship" – 1:55
7. "Demonomancy" – 2:22
8. "Black Mass Prayer" – 1:15
9. "Beast of Damnation" – 4:07
10. "Hail Sathanas" – 1:47
11. "Dawn of Satan's Millennium" – 4:46

== Credits ==
- Nuclear Holocausto – vocals, guitars
- Black Jesus – bass
- Necroperversor – drums
