= Bahimiron =

US black metal musical group

- Origin: United States
- Genres: Black metal; war metal
- Years active: 2001–2014
- Label: Moribund
- Past members: Grimlord; Jenoside; Blaash; Krag; Moon

Bahimiron was an American black metal band based in Houston, Texas, and Phoenix, Arizona. It was formed by vocalist and guitarist David "Grimlord" Herrera in 2001, after leaving death metal band Imprecation in 1993. Other members included bassist Jenoside and drummer Blaash, who played in the band from its formation until its dissolution, and second guitarist Luna, who joined in 2013. The band was known for their second album, Southern Nihilizm, released in 2008. After thirteen years, Bahimiron split-up in 2014.

Bahimiron's style has been labeled black metal and war metal. Pitchfork's Brandon Stosuy described their sound as "Beherit, Absu, and Gorgoroth in a dusty southern bar brawl". Blabbermouth.net's Scott Alisoglu stated that the band plays "Texas style of dangerously hot black metal that offer one images of decomposing bodies baking in 105-degree temperatures, no doubt the victims of ritual sacrifice."

== Members ==
=== Final line-up ===
- Grimlord (David Herrera) – vocals, guitar (2001–2014)
- Jenoside – bass (2001–2014)
- Blaash – drums, percussions (2001–2014) (died 2017)
- Luna (Milton Luna) – guitar (2013–2014)

=== Former members ===
- Krag – guitar (2001–2013)

== Discography ==
=== Studio albums ===
- Pure Negativism: In Allegiance with Self Wreckage (2006)
- Southern Nihilizm (2008)
- Rebel Hymns of Left Handed Terror (2011)

=== EPs and splits ===
- Hunting Down the Weak (2004)
- As the Sun Burns (2004)
- Pact in Dizease & Profanation (2006)
- Sargeist / Bahimiron (2006)
- Last of the Confederates (2009)

=== Demos ===
- Funeral Black (2002)
- Terror Division Bloodstrike (2003)
- Xrist Gutzlice (2004)
