= Beyond the Permafrost =

Studio album by Skeletonwitch
- Released: October 2, 2007
- Recorded: 2007
- Genres: Thrash metal; melodic black metal
- Length: 36:25
- Label: Prosthetic
- Producers: Cory Smoot and Skeletonwitch

Skeletonwitch chronology
Worship the Witch (2006)	Beyond the Permafrost (2007)	Breathing the Fire (2009)

Professional ratings
Review scores
Source	Rating
AbsolutePunk.net	(80%) link
Allmusic	Link
Lambgoat	Link

Beyond the Permafrost is the second full-length album by American metal band Skeletonwitch. The album blends thrash metal and influence from the NWOBHM movement with death/black metal vocals. The song "Soul Thrashing Black Sorcery" was featured in the video game, Brütal Legend. The songs, while aggressive, also have melodic parts.

== Track listing ==
No.	Title	Length
1.	"Upon Wings of Black"	2:40
2.	"Beyond the Permafrost"	2:30
3.	"Baptized in Flames"	4:06
4.	"Sacrifice for the Slaughtergod"	2:53
5.	"Vengeance Will Be Mine"	3:08
6.	"Limb From Limb"	2:16
7.	"Cast into the Open Sea"	3:16
8.	"Fire from the Sky"	2:34
9.	"Soul Thrashing Black Sorcery"	2:35
10.	"Remains of the Defeated"	3:06
11.	"Feast Upon Flesh"	3:09
12.	"Within My Blood"	4:12
Total length:		36:25

== Personnel ==
- Chance Garnette – vocals
- Nate Garnette – guitar
- Scott Hedrick – guitar
- Eric Harris – bass guitar
- Derrick Nau – drums
