= Blasphemy (band) =

Canadian black metal band

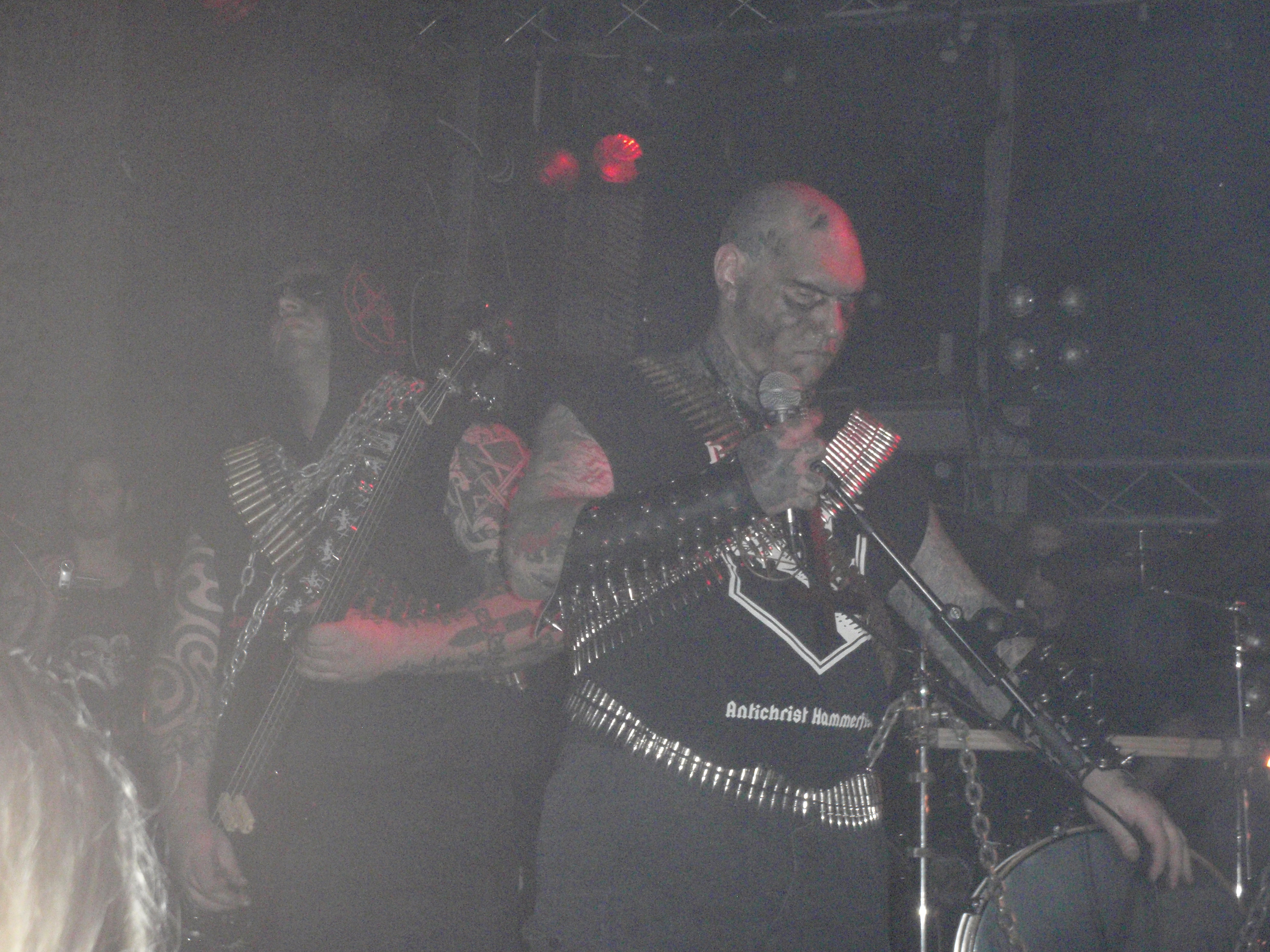
- Blasphemy performing in 2009

Background information
- Origin: Vancouver, British Columbia, Canada
- Genres: Black metal; death metal; war metal
- Years active: 1984–1994; 1999–present
- Labels: Wild Rags; Osmose; Nuclear War Now!; Displeased
- Members: Members

Blasphemy are a Canadian black metal band, formed in 1984 and based in Vancouver, British Columbia. Considered one of the first war metal bands, the band was initially formed by vocalist and occasional bassist Gerry Bull and drummer Sean Stone, better known by their respective stage names "Nocturnal Grave Desecrator and Black Winds" and "3 Black Hearts of Damnation and Impurity", with guitarist Geoff Drakes (better known by his stage name "Caller of the Storms") joining the band shortly thereafter. The band initially formed under the name Antichrist, and would see two further name changes to Desaster and Thrash Hammer before settling on Blasphemy in 1987.

The band have a reputation for violence, as well as some members being involved in criminal activity; including a member smuggling both narcotics and his girlfriend onto a commercial flight to Amsterdam, assaulting a police officer, and drug dealing. Consequently, most of the members have spent time in prison.

== History ==
Blasphemy formed in 1984. The band released a demo titled Blood Upon the Altar in 1989, and their debut album, Fallen Angel of Doom, the following year through Wild Rags, to whom they had signed to whilst touring the United States. Blasphemy's second full-length studio album, 1993's Gods of War, was released through Osmose Productions. 1993 also saw Blasphemy a part of the European tour dubbed the "Fuck Christ Tour"; touring alongside Immortal and Rotting Christ. Nocturnal Grave Desecrator and Black Winds left the band during the first few days of the tour after experiencing problems with then bassist Ace Gustapo Necrosleezer and Vaginal Commands. For the rest of the tour, Ace replaced Nocturnal Grave Desecrator and Black Winds on lead vocals.

After the "Fuck Christ Tour", Blasphemy became inactive for several years. Ryan Förster, known better as Deathlord of Abomination and War Apocalypse, joined the band in 1999 as a second guitarist. The band next played in July 2001 in Vancouver, with a recording of the show released as the live album Live Ritual – Friday the 13th the following year.

They were inactive again until 2009, when they played two concerts; one in Montreal and one in Helsinki, in the Black Flames of Blasphemy festival, with Proclamation, Black Witchery, Revenge and Archgoat. In 2010, Blasphemy headlined the second installation of the Nuclear War Now! festival in Germany.

Blasphemy's song "War Command" has been covered by Beherit and the cover appeared on Beherit's 1999 compilation album Beast of Beherit - Complete Worxxx. Blasphemy's "Winds of the Black Gods" was the opening track on the 2004 compilation Fenriz Presents... The Best of Old-School Black Metal.

== Band members ==
Current

- Nocturnal Grave Desecrator and Black Winds – lead vocals (1984–1993, 1999–present); bass (1984–1991)
- Caller of the Storms – guitars (1984–1994, 1999–present)
- Deathlord of Abomination and War Apocalypse – guitars (1999–present)
- Three Black Hearts of Damnation and Impurity – drums (1984–1994, 1999—present)

Session and live

- Kadeniac – bass, backing vocals (2017, 2022–present)
- Hellfukker – drums (2018–present)

Former

- Ace Gestapo Necrosleezer and Vaginal Commands – bass, backing vocals (1991–1994); lead vocals (1993–1994)
- Black Priest of 7 Satanic Rituals – guitars, backing vocals (1985–1989, 1991–1993)
- The Traditional Sodomizer of the Goddess of Perversity – guitars (1989–1991)
- Bestial Saviour of the Undead Legions – bass, backing vocals (1999–2003)
- V.K. – live bass

Timeline

== Discography ==
=== Studio albums ===
- Fallen Angel of Doom.... (1990)
- Gods of War (1993)

=== Live albums ===
- Live Ritual – Friday the 13th (2001)
- Desecration of São Paulo - Live in Brazilian Ritual Third Attack (2016)
- Victory (Son of the Damned) (2018)

=== Demo albums ===
- Blood Upon the Altar (1989)
- Die Hard Rehearsal (2001)
- Blood Upon the Soundspace (2018)
