= Gods of War (Blasphemy album) =

Studio album by Blasphemy
- Released: 1993
- Recorded: September–December 1992
- Studio: Fiasco Bros. Studios
- Genre: Black metal; death metal; war metal
- Length: 20:15; 41:56 (with Blood Upon the Altar)
- Label: Osmose
- Producer: Osmose

Blasphemy chronology
Fallen Angel of Doom (1990)	Gods of War (1993)	Live Ritual – Friday the 13th (2001)

Professional ratings
Review scores
Source	Rating
AllMusic	2/5 stars

Gods of War is Blasphemy's second full-length album, released in 1993. The 1989 demo Blood Upon the Altar has been released as bonus on most of the editions of this album, to compensate for the albums overly short running time. All songs were composed by Blasphemy.

== Track listing ==
All tracks are written by Blasphemy.

Gods of War
No.	Title	Length
1.	"Intro: Elders of the Apocalypse / Blood Upon the Altar"	2:31
2.	"Blasphemous Attack"	2:01
3.	"Gods of War"	0:26
4.	"Intro / Atomic Nuclear Desolation"	0:42
5.	"Nocturnal Slayer"	2:22
6.	"Emperor of the Black Abyss"	3:20
7.	"Intro / Blasphemy"	3:42
8.	"Intro / Necrosadist"	2:42
9.	"War Command"	0:45
10.	"Empty Chalice"	1:44

Blood Upon the Altar
No.	Title	Length
12.	"Ross Bay Intro"	1:06
13.	"War Command"	0:41
14.	"Demoniac"	3:07
15.	"Intro"	0:34
16.	"Ritual"	3:33
17.	"Nocturnal Slayer"	3:07
18.	"Blasphemy"	3:55
19.	"Intro / Blasphemous Attack / Guitar Effect Outro"	2:53

== Personnel ==
=== Blasphemy ===
- Caller of the Storms – lead and rhythm guitars, effects
- Ace Gustapo Necrosleezer and Vaginal Commands – bass, backing vocals, effects
- Nocturnal Grave Desecrator and Black Winds – vocals
- 3 Black Hearts of Damnation and Impurity – drums

=== Production ===
- Len Osanic – engineering
- Jeff Trebilcock – engineering
- SV. Bell Illustration – artwork
- Osmose – executive production

== Release history ==
Region	Date	Label	Format	Catalog
United States	1993	Osmose Productions	LP, CD, CS	OP 008
Europe	1993	Osmose Productions	LP, CD, CS	OP 008
Europe	2001	Osmose Productions	CD	OPCD 117
United States	2007	Nuclear War Now!	2xLP	ANTI-GOTH 073
Europe	2010	Osmose Productions	2xLP	OPLP 118
Europe	2012	Osmose Productions	2xLP	OPLP 118
Europe	2016	Osmose Productions	LP, CD	OP 117-1
