= Drawing Down the Moon =

Drawing Down the Moon may refer to:

- Drawing down the Moon (ritual), a Wiccan ritual
- Drawing Down the Moon (Beherit album), 1993
- Drawing Down the Moon (Azure Ray album), 2010
- Drawing Down the Moon (film), a 1997 movie starring Walter Koenig
- Drawing Down the Moon (book), a book on neopaganism by Margot Adler
