= Fallen Angel of Doom =

Fallen Angel of Doom....

Studio album by Blasphemy
- Released: August 1990
- Genre: War metal
- Length: 30:12
- Labels: Wild Rags (Netherlands, United States); Nuclear War Now! (USA 2007 reissue)

Blasphemy chronology
Blood Upon the Altar (1989)	Fallen Angel of Doom.... (1990)	Gods of War (1993)

Fallen Angel of Doom.... is the debut album by Canadian war/black metal band Blasphemy, released in 1990. The album is considered one of the most influential records for the war metal style (also known as "brutal black metal" or "bestial black metal").

== Reception ==
Professional ratings
Review scores
Source	Rating
AllMusic	2/5 stars
Sputnikmusic	4/5 stars

Tom of Terrorizer magazine called the album "heavier than the entire forests of Canada falling on your big toe" and included it on the list of The Heaviest Albums Ever: The albums Kerrang! forgot.

In 2013, Decibel ranked Fallen Angel of Doom at number 58 on its list of the Top 100 Black Metal Albums of All Time.

== Track listing ==
All tracks are written by Nocturnal Grave Desecrator and Black Winds, Black Priest of the 7 Satanic Blood Rituals, and Caller of the Storms.

No.	Title	Length
1.	"Winds of the Black Godz (Intro)"	1:20
2.	"Fallen Angel of Doom"	3:40
3.	"Hording of Evil Vengeance"	2:22
4.	"Darkness Prevails"	3:32
5.	"Desecration"	2:27
6.	"Ritual"	3:18
7.	"Weltering in Blood"	2:27
8.	"Demoniac"	2:45
9.	"Goddess of Perversity"	4:28
10.	"The Desolate One (Outro)"	3:53
Total length:		30:12

== Personnel ==
- Caller of the Storms – lead guitar, sound effects
- Traditional Sodomizer of the Goddess of Perversity – rhythm guitars, backing vocals, effects
- Nocturnal Grave Desecrator and Black Winds – bass, lead vocals, effects
- 3 Black Hearts of Damnation and Impurity – drums

== Release history ==
Region	Date	Label	Format	Catalog
Netherlands	1990	Wild Rags	LP, CD, CS	WRR019
United States	1990	Wild Rags	LP, CD, CS	WRR019
United States	2007	Nuclear War Now!	LP, 2xLP, CD	ANTI-GOTH 069
United States	2015	Nuclear War Now!	LP, CD	ANTI-GOTH 069
United States	2015	Ross Bay Cult	LP, CD	Command 008
