= Live Ritual – Friday the 13th =

Live album by Blasphemy
- Released: 2001
- Recorded: July 13, 2001 in Vancouver, Canada
- Genre: Black metal
- Length: 37:00; 76:24 (with Die Hard Rehearsal)
- Label: Osmose Productions
- Producer: Digz Supko, Yosuke Konishi, Fir Suidema, Blasphemy

Blasphemy chronology
Gods of War (1993)	Live Ritual – Friday the 13th (2001)	Desecration of São Paulo - Live in Brazilian Ritual Third Attack (2016)

Live Ritual – Friday the 13th is Blasphemy's first live album, first released in 2001 as a limited edition LP record via Nuclear War Now! The first 100 copies of the record (known as the Die Hard Edition by fans) were pressed on red vinyl and came with a bonus CD-R that contained the band's 15-track demo Die Hard Rehearsal, which was recorded at Ross Bay Studios on August 29, 2001. The album was later issued on CD, with the bonus demo, in 2002 through From Beyond Productions.

== Track listing ==
No.	Title	Length
1.	"War Command"	1:45
2.	"Blasphemous Attack"	1:44
3.	"Gods of War"	0:35
4.	"Demoniac"	3:16
5.	"Goddess of Perversity"	4:11
6.	"Fallen Angel of Doom..."	3:55
7.	"Atomic Nuclear Desolation"	2:01
8.	"The Desolate One"	3:53
9.	"Desecration"	2:31
10.	"Weltering in Blood"	2:35
11.	"Blasphemy"	3:46
12.	"Hoarding of Evil Vengeance"	2:35
13.	"Ritual"	4:13
Total length:		37:00

Die Hard Rehearsal
No.	Title	Length
14.	"War Command"	0:38
15.	"Blasphemous Attack"	1:39
16.	"Gods of War"	0:26
17.	"Demoniac"	3:02
18.	"Goddess of Perversity"	4:15
19.	"Fallen Angel of Doom..."	3:31
20.	"Darkness Prevails"	3:35
21.	"Desolate One"	0:40
22.	"Atomic Nuclear Desolation"	0:32
23.	"Desecration"	2:18
24.	"Weltering in Blood"	2:41
25.	"Blasphemy"	3:41
26.	"Hording of Evil Vengeance"	2:25
27.	"Nocturnal Slayer"	2:49
28.	"Ritual"	4:09
Total length:		76:24

== Personnel ==
=== Blasphemy ===
- Bestial Saviour Of The Undead Legions – bass
- 3 Black Hearts Of Damnation And Impurity – drums
- Caller Of The Storms – guitar
- Deathlord Of Abomination And War Apocalypse – guitar
- Nocturnal Grave Desecrator And Black Winds – vocals

=== Production ===
- Blasphemy – recording (Die Hard Rehearsal)
- Yosuke Konishi – recording (Live Ritual – Friday the 13th)
- Fir Suidema – remastering
- Digz Supko – mastering
- Chris Moyen – cover artwork
- Othalaz Von Armageddos and Justin Allfather – photography

== Release history ==
Region	Date	Label	Format	Catalog
Canada	2001	Nuclear War Now!	LP	ANTI-GOTH 004
Canada	2001	War Hammar Records	LP	WHR 666
United States	2002	From Beyond Productions	CD	FBP-007
