= Forever Abomination =

Studio album by Skeletonwitch
- Released: October 7, 2011
- Recorded: 2011
- Studios: Hydeaway, Van Nuys, CA and The Sunset Lodge, Silverlake, CA
- Genres: Thrash metal; melodic black metal
- Length: 32:04
- Label: Prosthetic
- Producer: Matt Hyde

Skeletonwitch chronology
Breathing the Fire (2009)	Forever Abomination (2011)	Serpents Unleashed (2013)

Professional ratings
Aggregate scores
Source	Rating
Metacritic	83/100
Review scores
Source	Rating
About.com	4/5 stars
Allmusic	4/5 stars
Metal Storm	8.9/10 stars
Pitchfork Media	7.3/10
Revolver Magazine	4/5 stars

Forever Abomination is the fourth studio album by American extreme metal band Skeletonwitch. It is also the first album to feature drummer Dustin Boltjes. The album was released on October 7, 2011.

== Track listing ==
No.	Title	Length
1.	"This Horrifying Force (The Desire to Kill)"	4:10
2.	"Reduced to the Failure of Prayer"	2:52
3.	"Of Ash and Torment"	2:55
4.	"Choke Upon Betrayal"	2:36
5.	"Erased and Forgotten"	2:24
6.	"The Infernal Resurrection"	2:52
7.	"Rejoice in Misery"	2:47
8.	"Cleaver of Souls"	3:49
9.	"Shredding Sacred Flesh"	2:34
10.	"Sink Beneath Insanity"	2:55
11.	"My Skin of Deceit"	2:12
Total length:		32:04

== Release dates ==
location	date
Europe	October 7, 2011
United Kingdom	October 10, 2011
United States of America	October 11, 2011
Japan	October 19, 2011

== Charts ==
Chart (2011)	Peak position
US Billboard 200	153
US Independent Albums (Billboard)	27
US Top Hard Rock Albums (Billboard)	11
US Top Rock Albums (Billboard)	38

== Personnel ==
Skeletonwitch

- Chance Garnette – vocals
- Nate "N8 Feet Under" Garnette – guitars
- Scott "Scunty D." Hedrick – guitars
- Evan "Loosh" Linger – bass
- Dustin Boltjes – drums
