= Breathing the Fire =

Studio album by Skeletonwitch
- Released: October 13, 2009
- Recorded: 2009
- Studios: Soundhouse Recording (Seattle, Washington)
- Genres: Thrash metal; melodic black metal
- Length: 34:49
- Label: Prosthetic
- Producer: Jack Endino

Skeletonwitch chronology
Beyond the Permafrost (2007)	Breathing the Fire (2009)	Forever Abomination (2011)

Professional ratings
Review scores
Source	Rating
Allmusic	4.0/5 stars
Lords of Metal	7/10 stars
Metal 1	9/10 stars

Breathing the Fire is the third studio album by American extreme metal band Skeletonwitch. Released on October 13, 2009, it was the group's first album to include bassist Evan Linger.

== Track listing ==
No.	Title	Length
1.	"Submit to the Suffering"	2:11
2.	"Longing for Domination"	2:42
3.	"Where the Light Has Failed"	2:13
4.	"Released from the Catacombs"	3:14
5.	"Stand Fight and Die"	3:26
6.	"The Despoiler of Human Life"	2:23
7.	"Crushed Beyond Dust"	2:29
8.	"Blinding Black Rage"	2:32
9.	"Gorge Upon My Soul"	3:37
10.	"Repulsive Salvation"	3:35
11.	"Strangled by Unseen Hands"	2:49
12.	"...And into the Flame"	3:38
Total length:		34:49

== Personnel ==
Skeletonwitch

- Chance Garnette – vocals
- Nate "N8 Feet Under" Garnette – guitars
- Scott "Scunty D." Hedrick – guitars
- Evan "Loosh" Linger – bass
- Derrick "Mullet Chad" Nau – drums
