= Electric Doom Synthesis =

Studio album by Beherit
- Released: 28 June 1995
- Genre: Dark ambient
- Length: 45:29
- Label: Spinefarm

Beherit chronology
H418ov21.C (1994)	Electric Doom Synthesis (1995)	Engram (2009)

Electric Doom Synthesis is Beherit's third studio album and second dark ambient album. It features ritualistic music, pitchshifted spoken word, and occasional guitars, all much in the spirit of black metal.

== Track listing ==
All songs written and performed by Marko Laiho.

1. "Ambush" – 5:14
2. "We Worship" – 1:26
3. "Dead Inside" – 6:10
4. "Beyond Vision" – 4:17
5. "Deep Night 23rd" – 7:08
6. "Drawing Down the Moon" – 2:56
7. "Sense" – 10:10
8. "Temple" – 7:51
