= Soul Metamorphosis =

EP by In Battle
- Released: 2003
- Recorded: 2003
- Studio: Necromorbus Studio in Stockholm, Sweden
- Genre: Black metal, death metal, Viking metal
- Length: 15:07
- Label: Imperial Dawn Records
- Producer: Vidar Widgren; In Battle

In Battle chronology
The Rage of the Northmen (1999)	Soul Metamorphosis (2003)	Welcome to the Battlefeld (2004)

Soul Metamorphosis is an EP by Swedish extreme metal band In Battle.

== Track listing ==
1. "Pioneers of a Dead Future" - 3:50
2. "Dawn of Darkness" - 3:38
3. "Soul Metamorphosis" - 3:24
4. "King God" - 4:15

== Personnel ==
- John Odhinn Sandin - Vocals
- John Frölén - Guitars
- Nils Fjellström - Drums
- Hasse Carlsson - Guitars
- Marcus Edvardsson - Bass
