= Engram (album) =

Studio album by Beherit
- Released: 9 April 2009
- Recorded: November 2008 at D-Studio, Klaukkala, Finland
- Genre: Black metal
- Length: 43:04
- Label: Spinefarm
- Producer: Nuclear Holocausto

Beherit chronology
Electric Doom Synthesis (1995)	Engram (2009)	Celebrate the Dead (2012)

Professional ratings
Review scores
Source	Rating
AllMusic	3.5/5 stars

Engram is the fourth studio album by Beherit. It features a return to a straight black metal style.

== Track listing ==
1. "Axiom Heroine" – 4:41
2. "Destroyer of Thousand Worlds" – 3:05
3. "All in Satan" – 3:33
4. "Pagan Moon" – 7:16
5. "Pimeyden Henki" – 4:45
6. "Suck My Blood" – 4:27
7. "Demon Advance" – 15:17

== Charts ==
Chart (2009)	Peak position
Finnish Albums (Suomen virallinen lista)	10
