= Serpents Unleashed =

Studio album by Skeletonwitch
- Released: October 29, 2013
- Recorded: 2013
- Genre: Thrash metal; melodic black metal
- Length: 31:41
- Label: Prosthetic
- Producer: Kurt Ballou

Skeletonwitch chronology
Forever Abomination (2011)	Serpents Unleashed (2013)	Devouring Radiant Light (2018)

Professional ratings
Aggregate scores
Source	Rating
Metacritic	77/100
Review scores
Source	Rating
Allmusic	4/5 stars
The A.V. Club	B+
Pitchfork	7.5/10 stars

Serpents Unleashed is the fifth studio album by American extreme metal band Skeletonwitch. The album was released on October 29, 2013. This album was the last album released with original vocalist Chance Garnette, before he was fired from the band in early 2015 due to his problems with alcohol.

== Track listing ==
No.	Title	Length
1.	"Serpents Unleashed"	2:11
2.	"Beneath Dead Leaves"	3:07
3.	"I Am of Death (Hell Has Arrived)"	2:47
4.	"From a Cloudless Sky"	2:48
5.	"Burned From Bone"	2:39
6.	"Unending, Everliving"	3:03
7.	"Blade on the Flesh, Blood on My Hands"	2:26
8.	"This Evil Embrace"	3:39
9.	"Unwept"	2:25
10.	"Born of the Light That Does Not Shine"	2:18
11.	"More Cruel Than Weak"	4:18
Total length:		31:41

== Charts ==
Chart (2013)	Peak position
US Billboard 200	62
US Independent Albums (Billboard)	10
US Top Hard Rock Albums (Billboard)	7
US Top Rock Albums (Billboard)	20

== Personnel ==
Skeletonwitch

- Chance Garnette - vocals
- Scott "Scunty D." Hendrick - guitar
- Nate "N8 Feet Under" Garnette - guitar
- Dustin Boltjes - drums
- Evan "Loosh" Linger - bass
- Kurt Ballou - production, mixing, engineering
