= Skeletonwitch =

American thrash metal band

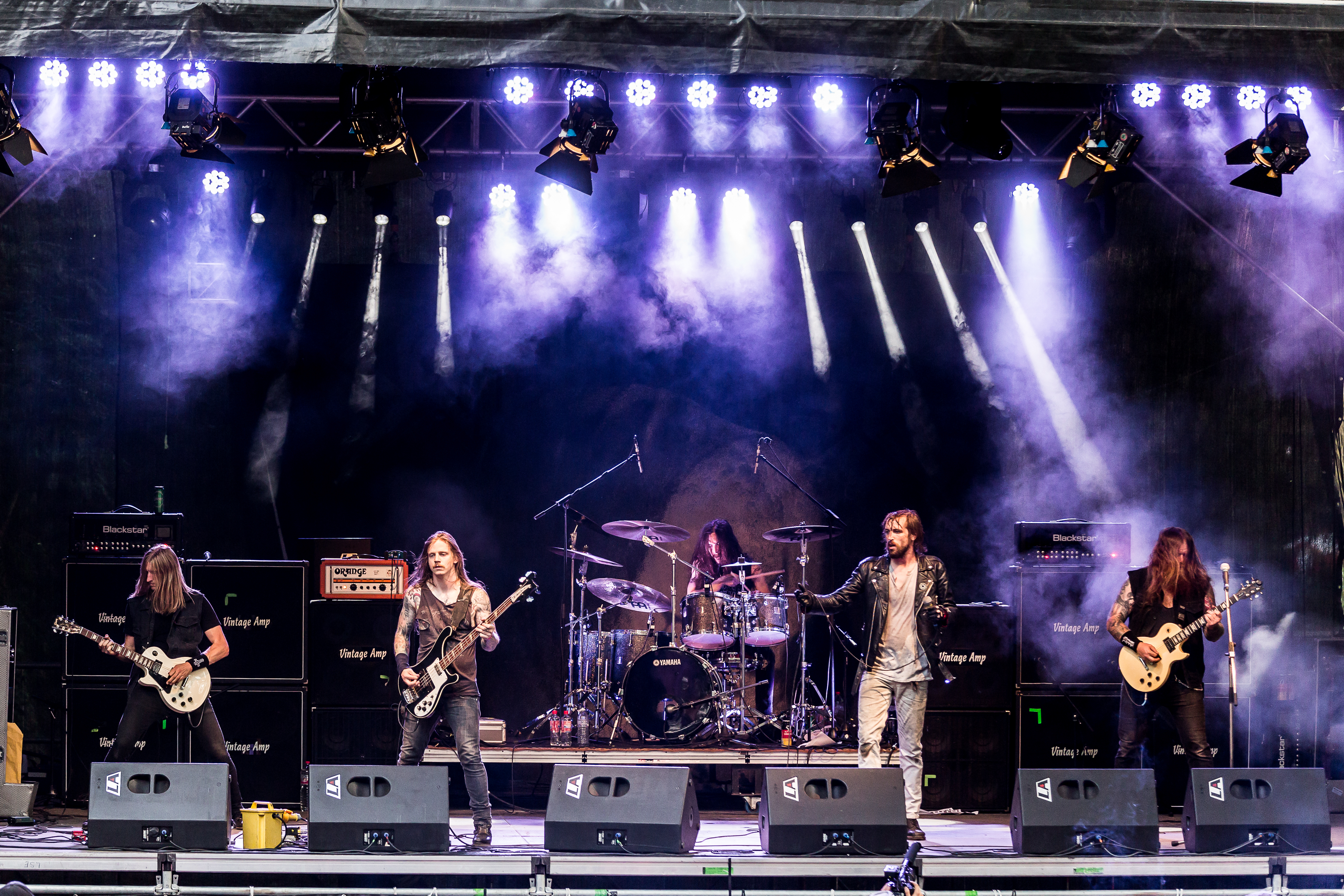
- Skeletonwitch at Rock unter den Eichen 2018, Germany

Background information
- Origin: Athens, Ohio, U.S.
- Genres: Thrash metal; melodic black metal
- Years active: 2003–present
- Labels: Prosthetic, Shredded
- Members: Nate Garnette; Scott Hedrick; Evan Linger; Adam Clemans
- Past members: Eric Harris; Derrick Nau; Jimi Shestina; Dustin Boltjes; Chance Garnette
- Website: skeletonwitch.com

Skeletonwitch is an American thrash metal band from Athens, Ohio, formed in 2003. The band currently consists of lead guitarist Nate Garnette, rhythm guitarist Scott Hedrick, bassist Evan Linger, and vocalist Adam Clemans. The band fired original vocalist Chance Garnette in late 2014 or early 2015. In early 2018, drummer Dustin Boltjes left the band after seven years.

== History ==
Skeletonwitch was formed in 2003 in Athens, Ohio. Guitarist Hedrick heard Nate Garnette's former band Serkesoron's demo while they were at Ohio University. They started a new group. Skeletonwitch released their first album, At One with the Shadows, on August 11, 2004 though Shredded Records. After forming the band, they recruited Nate's older brother, Chance, as vocalist. The three have been the only constant members. They have gone through three drummers: Tony Laureano, Derrick "Mullet Chad" Nau replacing Jimi Shestina, then Eric Harris with Evan Linger on bass guitar.

After signing to Prosthetic, Skeletonwitch released Beyond the Permafrost on October 2, 2007. In 2008, Skeletonwitch opened for Danzig's Blackest of the Black tour.

On October 13, 2009, Skeletonwitch released their third studio album, Breathing the Fire, which debuted at No. 151 on the Billboard 200 charts. The soundtrack of the video game Brütal Legend featured Skeletonwitch's "Soul Thrashing Black Sorcery". The song "Crushed Beyond Dust" was featured on the Rock Band network on February 28, 2010. Skeletonwitch was featured on all of the dates of Ozzfest 2010.

Skeletonwitch was featured on an Adult Swim video for their song "Bringers of Death" in 2010. "Bringers of Death" also appears on the Adult Swim heavy metal compilation Metal Swim.

In March 2011, Skeletonwitch parted with drummer Derrick Nau and temporarily replaced him with Tony Laureano. Skeletonwitch released their fourth studio album, Forever Abomination, on October 7, 2011. It was the first album with drummer Dustin Boltjes, replacing Nau. The House of Blues in Orlando banned Skeletonwitch after deeming them "unfit to be associated with Disney." The band released its fifth studio album, Serpents Unleashed, in October 2013.

Vocalist Chance Garnette withdrew from live appearances partway through a tour in October 2014. Garnette's last show with Skeletonwitch was October 15, 2014, at the Webster Theater in Hartford, CT. Days later, he appeared in Worcester District Court in Worcester, Massachusetts, and was "charged with assault and battery on a family/household member". The case was continued to December 10, 2014. Garnette was released on $500 bail. He was replaced on a European tour the following March with former Cannabis Corpse vocalist Andy Horn. It was later confirmed that Garnette stated that the band fired him due to alcohol abuse, for which he sought treatment. His permanent replacement was confirmed in February 2016 as Adam Clemans, frontman of blackened sludge metal band Wolvhammer and former vocalist of Veil of Maya.

On April 26, 2018, the band announced Devouring Radiant Light as the title of their upcoming album. The album was released on July 20, 2018.

== Band members ==
Skeletonwitch at Rock unter den Eichen 2018 (Germany)

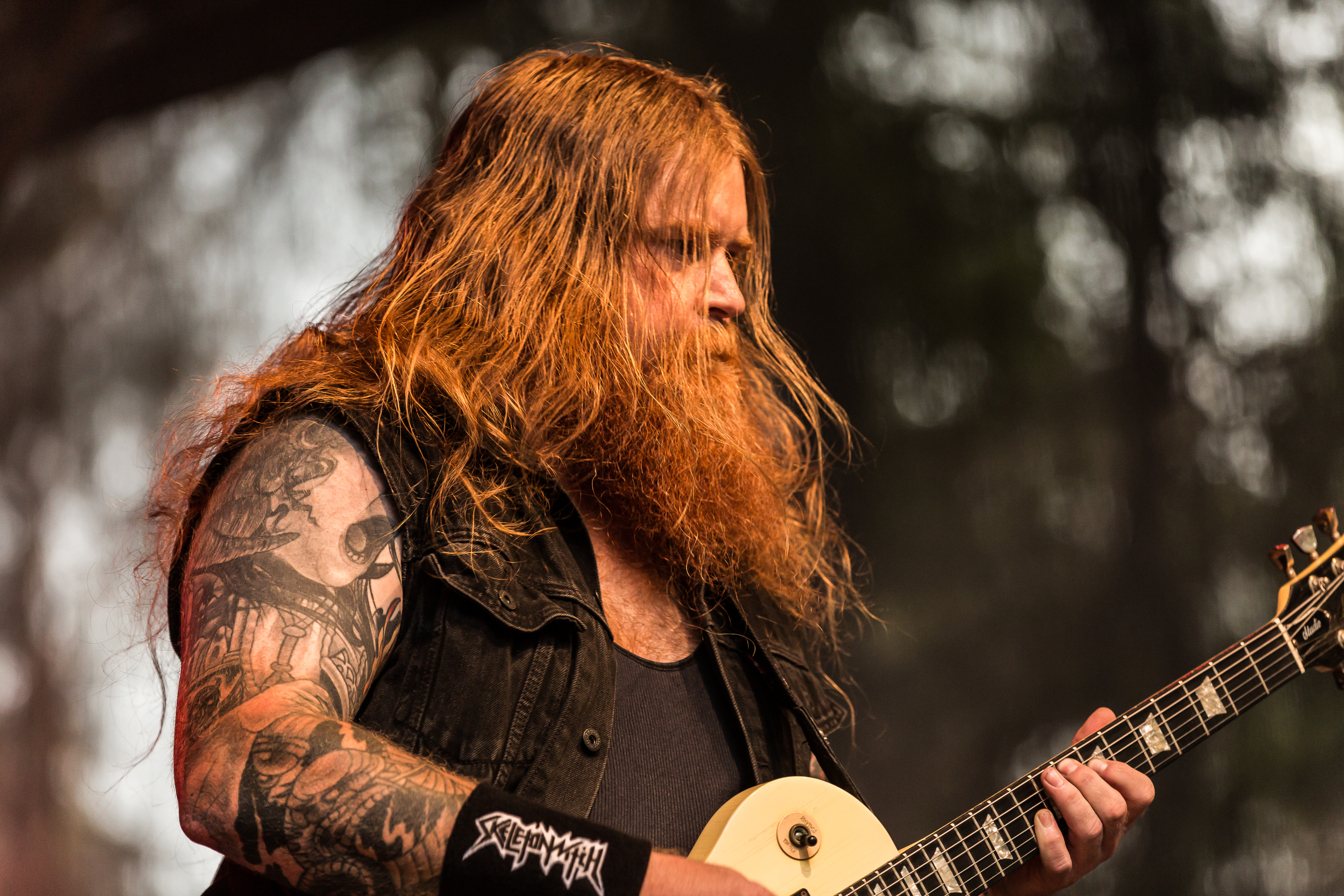
Nate Garnette

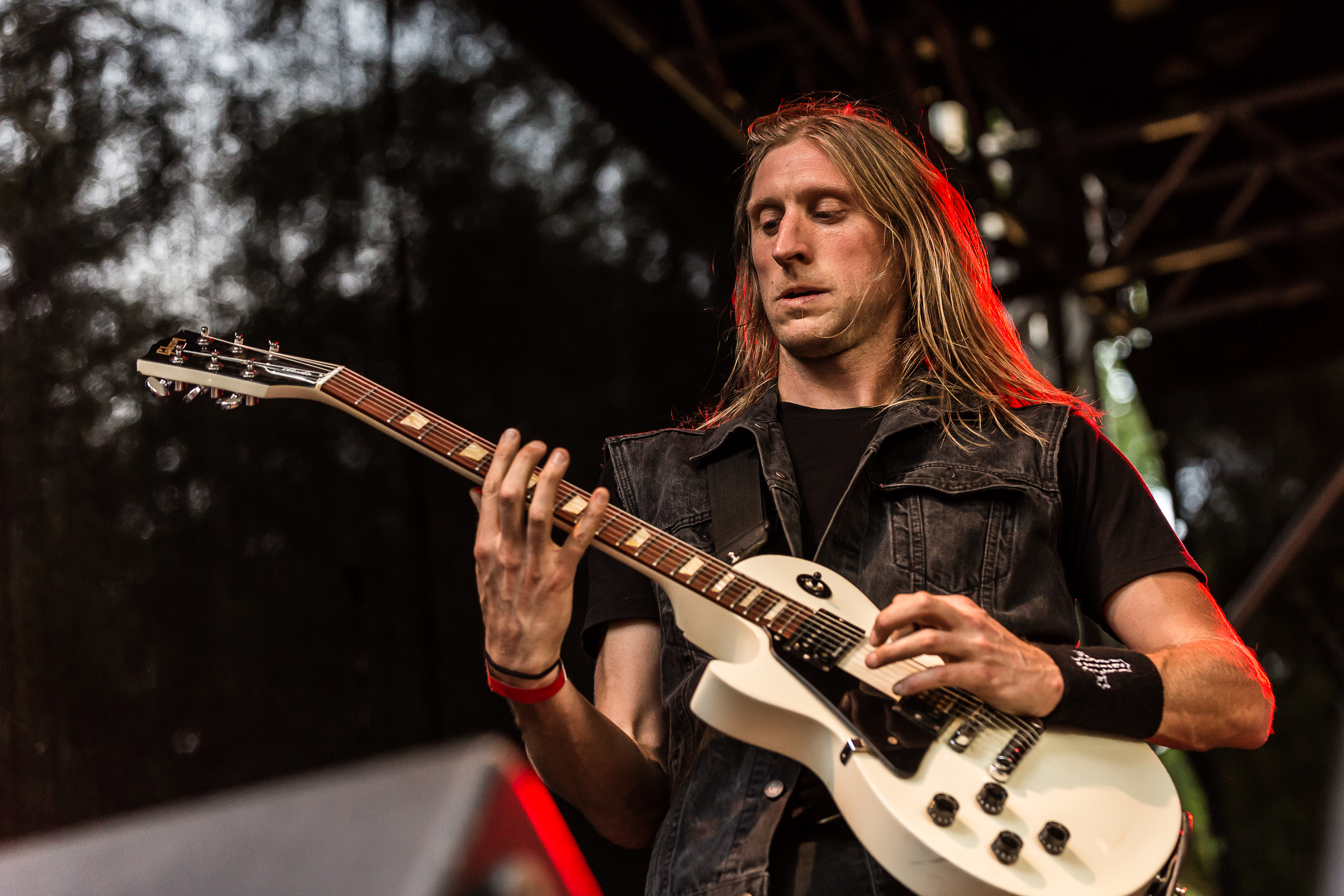
Scott Hedrick

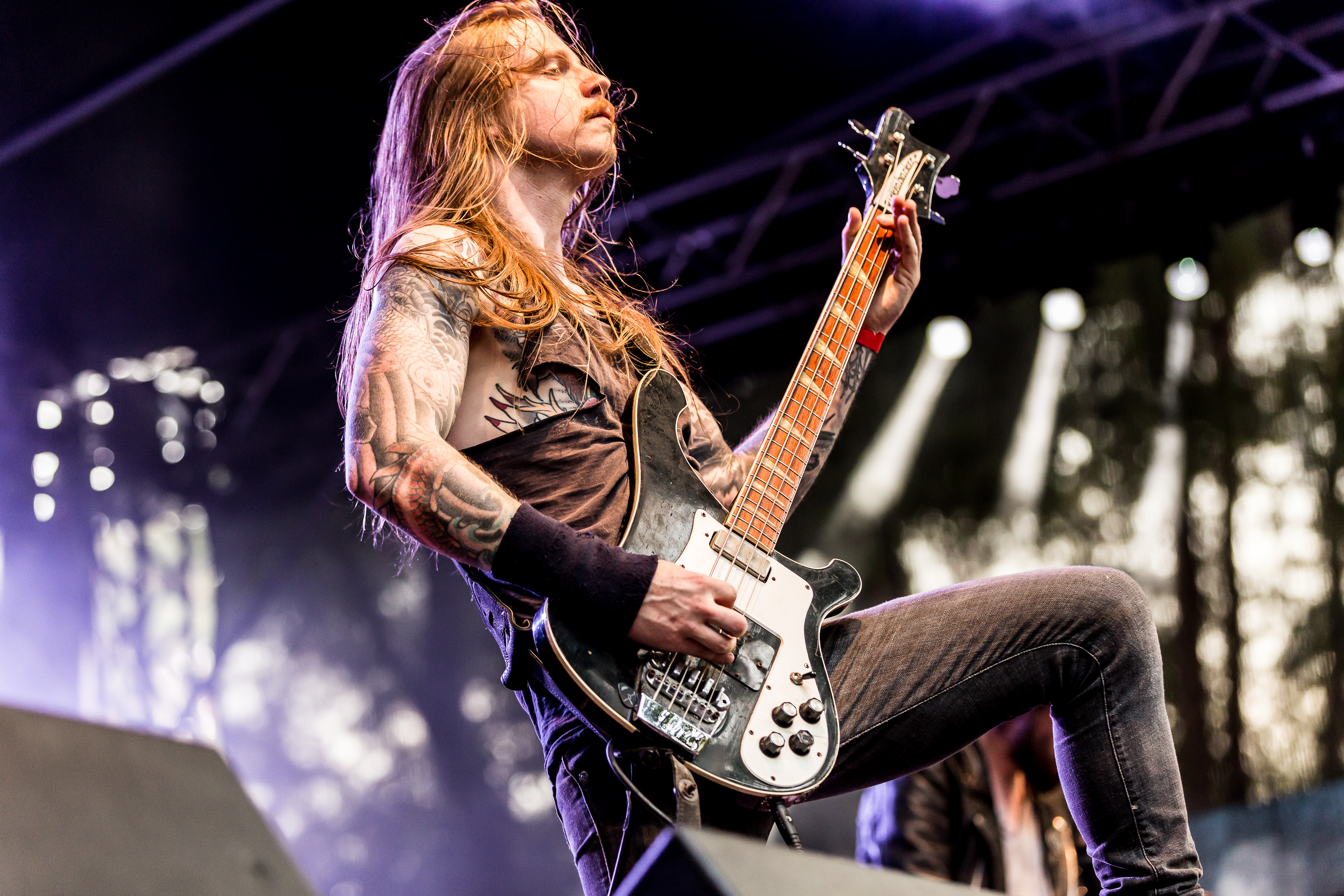
Evan Linger

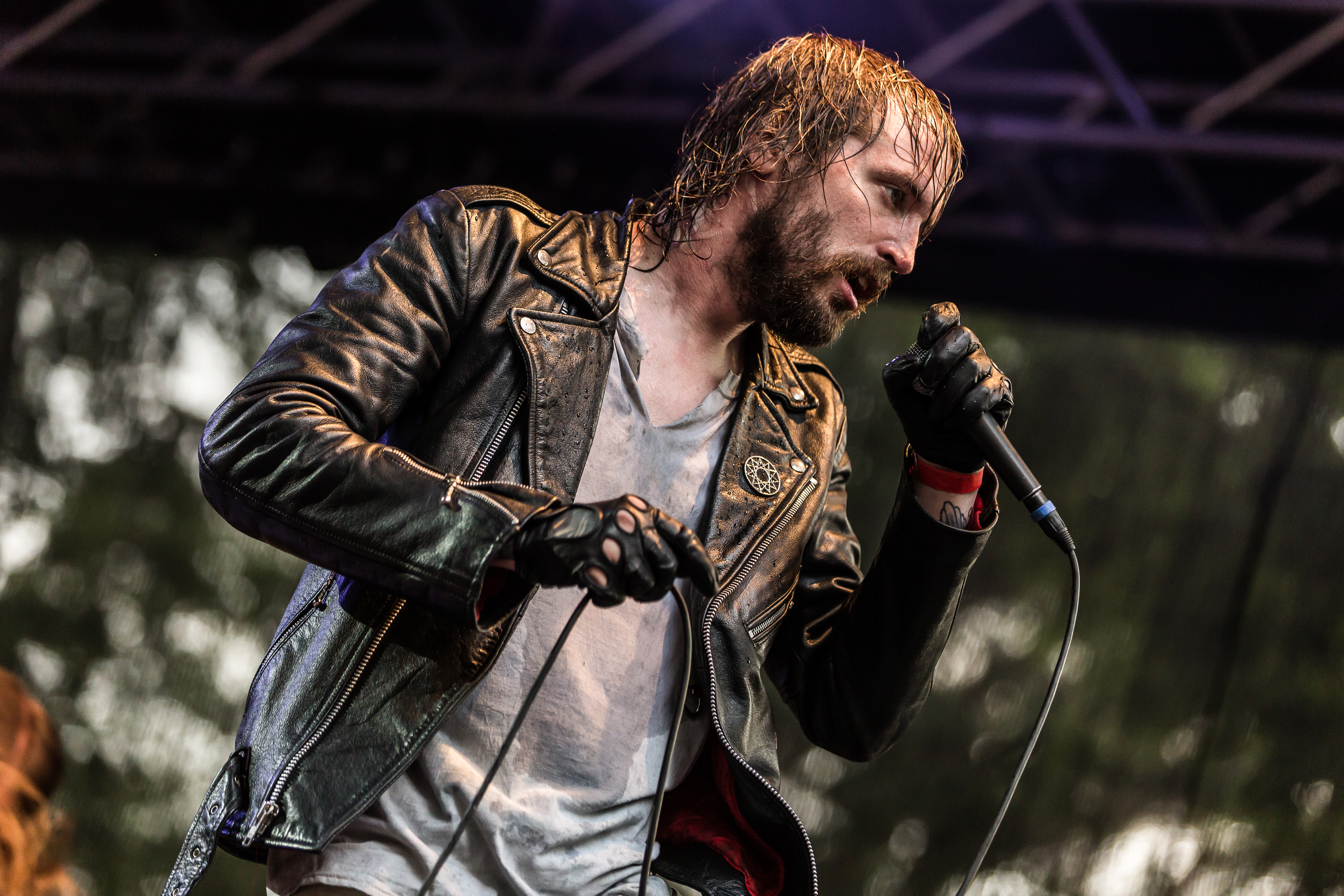
Adam Clemans

Current members

- Nate "N8 Feet Under" Garnette – lead guitar (2003–present)
- Scott "Scunty D." Hedrick – rhythm guitar (2003–present)
- Evan "Loosh" Linger – bass (2008–present)
- Adam Clemans – vocals (2016–present)

Current live musicians

- James Stewart – drums (2018–present)
- Toby Swope – drums (2019–present)

Former members

- Chance Garnette – vocals (2003–2015)
- Derrick Nau – drums (2003–2011)
- Jimi Shestina – bass (2003–2005)
- Eric Harris – bass (2005–2008)
- Dustin Boltjes – drums (2011–2018)

Former live musicians

- Tony Laureano – drums (2011)
- Andy Horn – vocals (2015)
- Jon "The Charn" Rice – drums (2018)

Timeline

== Discography ==
Studio albums

- At One with the Shadows (2004)
- Beyond the Permafrost (2007)
- Breathing the Fire (2009)
- Forever Abomination (2011)
- Serpents Unleashed (2013)
- Devouring Radiant Light (2018)

EPs

- Worship the Witch (2006)
- Onward to Battle/The Infernal Resurrection (2011)
- The Apothic Gloom (2016)

Demos

- Demo (2005)

Live albums

- Live at the Union Friday the 13th (2004)

Other appearances

- Metal Swim - Adult Swim compilation album (2010)
