= H418ov21.C =

1994 studio album by Beherit

Studio album by Beherit
- Recorded: February–March 1994, Helsinki
- Genre: Dark ambient
- Label: Spinefarm
- Producer: Marko "Nuclear Holocausto" Laiho

Beherit chronology
Drawing Down the Moon (1993)	H418ov21.C (1994)	Electric Doom Synthesis (1995)

H418ov21.C (short for House 418 of 21st Century) is the second studio album by Finnish black metal band Beherit, released in 1994. The album is the group's first dark ambient recording.

== Track listing ==
All songs written and performed by Marko Laiho.

1. "The Gate of Inanna" – 4:25
2. "Tribal Death" – 6:59
3. "Emotional Ecstasy" – 3:48
4. "Fish" – 3:22
5. "21st Century" – 4:00
6. "Paradise (Part II)" – 3:38
7. "Mystik Force" – 6:55
8. "Spirit of the God of Fire" – 3:22
9. "E-scape" – 3:10
