= Worship the Witch =

EP by Skeletonwitch
- Released: August 2006
- Recorded: 2006
- Genre: Thrash metal, black metal
- Length: 11:50

Skeletonwitch chronology
At One with the Shadows (2004)	Worship the Witch (2006)	Beyond the Permafrost (2007)

Alternative cover
- Vinyl cover

Worship The Witch is the first EP released by American extreme metal band Skeletonwitch.

== Track listing ==
No.	Title	Length
1.	"Beyond The Permafrost"	2:43
2.	"Fire From The Sky"	2:35
3.	"Feast Upon Flesh"	3:18
4.	"Forever in the Abyss"	3:14
Total length:		11:50

== Personnel ==
- Chance Garnette – vocals
- Nate Garnette – guitars
- Scott Hedrick – guitars
- Eric Harris – bass
- Derrick Nau – drums
