= Grimlord (band) =

Polish heavy metal band

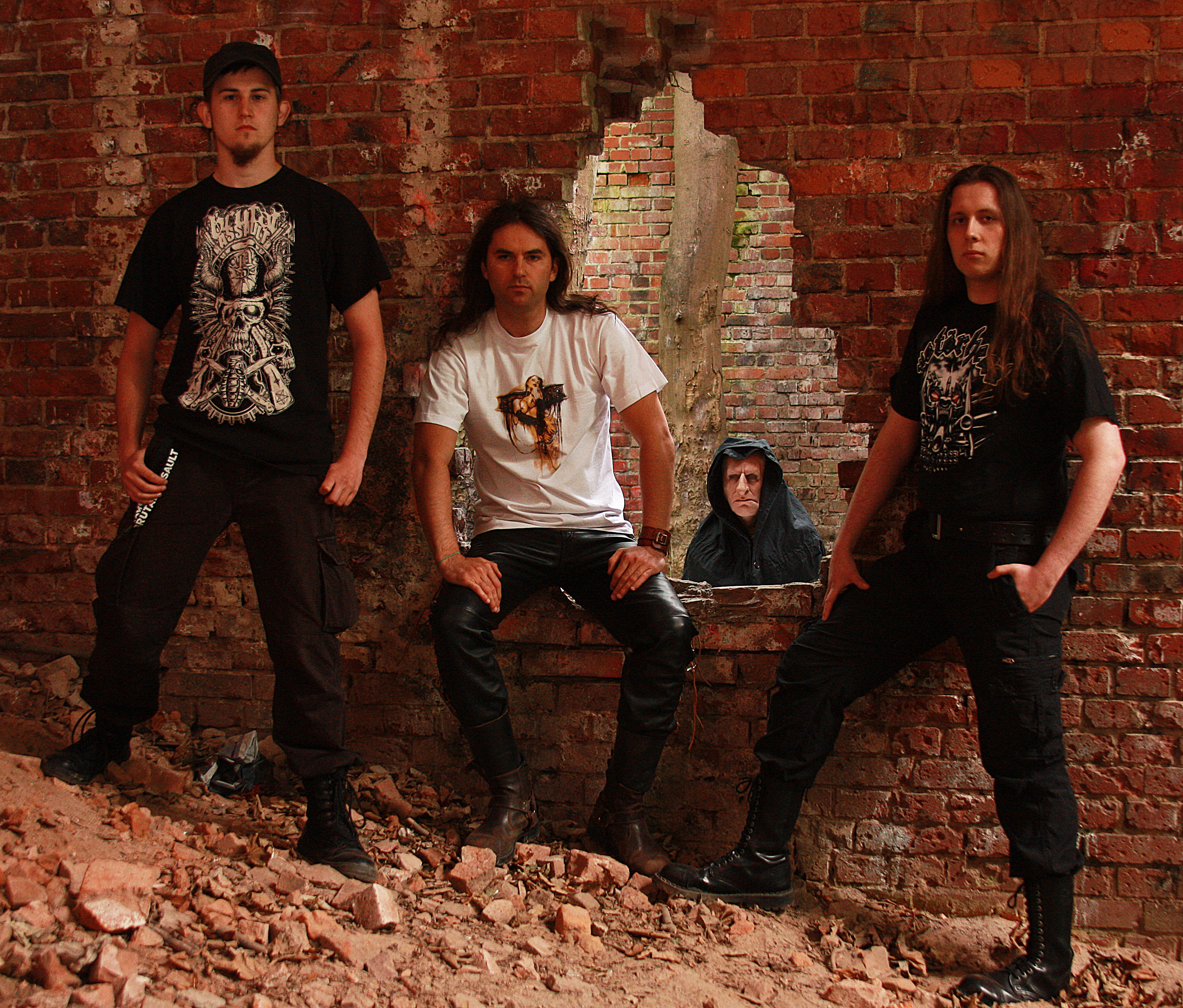
- Grimlord, 2012.

Background information
- Origin: Wrocław, Poland
- Genres: Metal, progressive metal
- Years active: 1999–present
- Label: Legacy Records
- Members: Bartosz Źrebiec
- Website: www.grimlord.eu

Grimlord is a Polish heavy metal band from Wrocław, formed in 1999.

== Members ==
=== Current members ===
- Bartosz Źrebiec – guitar, vocals

=== Session members ===
- Kacper Stachowiak – drums

=== Former members ===
- Rafał Krent – bass (as a photo session member)
- Rafał Kowalski - guitar
- Łukasz „Lukas” Boratyn - drums

== Discography ==
- Nocna Wizyta (CD Demo, 2003)
- Zaćmienie (CD single, 2005)
- Blood Runneth Over (2007)
- Dolce Vita Sath An As (2009)
- V-Column (Legacy Records, 2012)
