= Kingdom of Fear (In Battle album) =

Studio album by In Battle
- Released: September 3, 2007
- Recorded: 2007
- Genre: Black metal, death metal, Viking metal
- Length: 44:44
- Label: Candlelight Records

In Battle chronology
Welcome to the Battlefield (2004)	Kingdom of Fear (2007)	Flames and Death (2009)

Kingdom of Fear is the fourth studio album by the Swedish band In Battle. The album was released through Candlelight Records and Nocturnal Arts Productions.

== Track listing ==
1. "Kingdom of Fear" - 4:38
2. "The Multitude" - 4:04
3. "The Wandering One" - 4:48
4. "Follow the Allfather" - 3:51
5. "Tyr" - 3:12
6. "The Dead Shall See" - 4:22
7. "The Curse" - 3:08
8. "I Kamp" - 4:18
9. "Terrorkings" - 3:48
10. "Path of Power" - 4:17
11. "Raven Calls" - 4:24

== Personnel ==
Per the album's notes.

- John Odhinn Sandin - vocals
- Hasse Carlsson - guitar
- Tomas Elofsson - guitar
- John Frölén - bass
- Nils Fjallström - drums
- Tim Turan - mastering
