= Imprecation (band) =

American metal band

Imprecation is an American death metal band. They have released three albums, all on Dark Descent Records.

== Select discography ==
- Satanae Tenebris Infinita (2013)
- Damnatio ad Bestias (2019)
- Diabolical Flames of the Ascended Plague (split with Black Blood Invocation, 2019)
- In Nomine Diaboli (2022)
- Vomitum Tempestas (EP, 2025)
