= Empire of Fear: Inside the Islamic State =

2015 book

- Author: Andrew Hosken
- Genre: Autobiography
- Publisher: Universities Press
- Publication date: 2015
- Media type: Print
- Pages: 304
- ISBN: 178074806X

Empire of Fear: Inside the Islamic State is a book by Andrew Hosken, a BBC reporter specialized on the Islamic State. Said book deals with the Islamic State, the conditions which led to its creation, its funding and its future plans for expansion.
