= Goat Semen =

Peruvian metal band

Goat Semen is a Peruvian war metal band. They have received brief mentions from publications such as Loudwire and Gear Gods. The band's style has been categorized as black metal, death metal and heavy metal. Kerrang named Goat Semen as the seventh "most offensive band name of all time." Frontman Erick Neyla is quoted saying: "I have never regretted naming the band Goat Semen."

== Band members ==
- Erick Neyla - vocals
- Hellfucker - guitar

== Discography ==
- Demo 2003
- Nahdaan Helvetissa
- Devotos del Diablo (2004)
- En Vivo en Lima Hell (2007)
- Ego Sum Satana (2015)
- Fuck Christ (2024)
