= In Battle =

Swedish extreme metal band

- Origin: Sundsvall, Sweden
- Genres: Black metal; death metal; Viking metal; war metal
- Years active: 1996-present
- Labels: Napalm Records; Imperial Dawn Records; Cold Records; Metal Blade Records; Candlelight Records; Nocturnal Art Productions
- Members: John Odhinn Sandin; John Frölén; Hasse Karlsson; Nils Fjellström
- Past members: See below

In Battle is a Swedish extreme metal band from Sundsvall. The band's lyrics focus on Norse mythology and war.

== History ==
The original line-up consisted of John Frölén on guitar and bass, John Odhinn Sandin on vocals, Håkan Sjödin on guitar and bass, and Otto Wiklund on drums. Håkan Sjödin left the band early to play with Setherial full time. The band's first album, In Battle, was recorded at Sunlight Studio in Stockholm, Sweden and released through Napalm Records in 1997. Their second release, The Rage of the Northmen, came in March 1998. It was recorded at Ballerina Audio, Umeå, Sweden. In 1999, the only member left was Frölén, who started writing a third album. In 2002, he began rehearsing with Sandin (this time on drums), and asked Hans Carlsson (guitar) of Diabolical to join the band. In 2003, Nils Fjellström of Aeon replaced Sandin on drums and Sandin went back to singing. The Soul Metamorphosis EP was recorded at Necromorbus Studio in Stockholm, Sweden. In 2004, their album Welcome to the Battlefield (recorded in three different studios) was released through Cold Records and Metal Blade Records. Erik Rutan from Morbid Angel and Hate Eternal mixed and mastered the album. Rutan played a guitar solo on the album. In April 2005, the band left Cold Records after that album's release. In 2006, In Battle signed with Nocturnal Art Productions and began working on Kingdom of Fear. The album was released on September 3, 2007. In Battle were working on a fifth studio album with a working title of Flames & Death.

== Line-up ==
=== Current members ===
- John Odhinn Sandin - vocals (1996–1998, 2002–present)
- John Frölén - bass (formerly guitar) (1996–present)
- Hasse Karlsson - guitar (2002–present)
- Nils Fjellström - drums (2003–present)

=== Former members ===
- Håkan Sjödin (aka Mysteriis) - guitar/bass (1996–1997)
- Otto Wiklund - drums/vocals (1996–1998)
- Marcus Edvardsson - bass (2003)

== Discography ==
- In Battle (full-length, 1997)
- The Rage of the Northmen (full-length, 1999)
- Soul Metamorphosis (EP, 2003)
- Welcome to the Battlefield (full-length, 2004)
- Kingdom of Fear (full-length, 2007)
- Flames & Death (full-length, TBA)
