= Drawing Down the Moon (Beherit album) =

Studio album by Beherit
- Released: 13 November 1993
- Recorded: April–September 1992 at Studio Sound Kuopio, Finland
- Genre: Black metal
- Length: 39:30
- Label: Spinefarm
- Producer: Nuclear Holocausto

Beherit chronology
The Oath of Black Blood (1991)	Drawing Down the Moon (1993)	H418ov21.C (1994)

Professional ratings
Review scores
Source	Rating
Sputnikmusic	3.5/5 stars

Drawing Down the Moon is the debut studio album by Finnish black metal band Beherit. It was released in November 1993, through Spinefarm Records. The album is notable for its usage of space-like synth sounds and occasional use of computer-altered vocals.

The lyrics to "Intro" were taken from the Seventh Satanic Statement, as transcribed by Anton LaVey on the Satanic Bible.

In 2013, Decibel ranked Drawing Down the Moon at number 10 on its list of the Top 100 Black Metal Albums of All Time.

== Track listing ==
All music written by Marko Laiho.

1. "Intro (Tireheb)" – 0:45
2. "Salomon's Gate" – 3:42
3. "Nocturnal Evil" – 2:53
4. "Sadomatic Rites" – 4:07
5. "Black Arts" – 3:33
6. "The Gate of Nanna" – 4:15
7. "Nuclear Girl" – 1:32
8. "Unholy Pagan Fire" – 3:54
9. "Down There..." – 2:36
10. "Summerlands" – 3:20
11. "Werewolf, Semen and Blood" – 3:08
12. "Thou Angel of the Gods" – 2:23
13. "Lord of Shadows and Goldenwood" – 3:23

== Personnel ==
=== Beherit ===
- Nuclear Holocausto (Marko Laiho) – vocals, rhythm and lead guitars, synths
- Necroperversor (Pekka Virkanen) – drums
- Black Jesus (Santtu Siippainen) – bass

=== Additional ===
- Nuclear Holocausto – production
