= Black Witchery =

American death/black metal band

- Also known as: Witchery
- Origin: Winter Springs, Florida, United States
- Genres: Black metal, death metal, war metal
- Years active: 1999–present
- Labels: Full Moon Productions; Nuclear War Now! Productions; Dark Horizon Records; Osmose Productions
- Members: Impurath; Vaz; V.B.
- Past members: Steve "Tregenda" Childers; Alal'Xhaasztur

Black Witchery is an American war metal band from Winter Springs, Florida.

The band formed in the mid-1990s after the dissolution of the Irreverent. It was known as Witchery before changing to their current name in 1999 due to Swedish band Witchery already using the name.

== History ==
The band issued two splits and an EP before releasing their debut album, Desecration of the Holy Kingdom, in 2001 through Full Moon Productions. In 2005, they signed with Osmose Productions and released their second album, Upheaval of Satanic Might, followed by a split album with Archgoat, entitled Desecration & Sodomy in 2008. The two bands toured Europe in 2017.

A live album, Live Desecration Ritual, was released in 2010. Their third full-length, Inferno of Sacred Destruction, arrived in 2010, followed by the Nuclear War Now! Productions-issued Evil Shall Prevail in 2016, the latter compiling tracks from the band's early demos and split EPs, and also previously unreleased material.

On February 2, 2016, former guitarist Steve "Tregenda" Childers died as a result of a car accident at the age of 49.

== Members ==
Current members

- Impurath – lead vocals, bass (1996–present)
- V.B. – guitar (2019–present)
- Vaz – drums (1997–present)

Former members

- Tregenda – guitar (1999–2013; died 2016)
- Alal'Xhaasztur – guitar (2013–2019; died 2024)
- Darkwolf – guitar, drums (1996–1997)

== Discography ==
=== Studio albums ===
- Desecration of the Holy Kingdom (2001)
- Upheaval of Satanic Might (2005)
- Inferno of Sacred Destruction (2010)

=== Split albums ===
- Hellstorm of Evil Vengeance (with Conqueror) (1999)
- Desecration & Sodomy (with Archgoat) (2008)
- Holocaustic Death March to Humanity's Doom (with Revenge) (2015)

=== Live albums ===
- Live Descration Ritual (2010)

=== Compilation albums ===
- Evil Shall Prevail (2016)
