= Archgoat =

Finnish black metal band

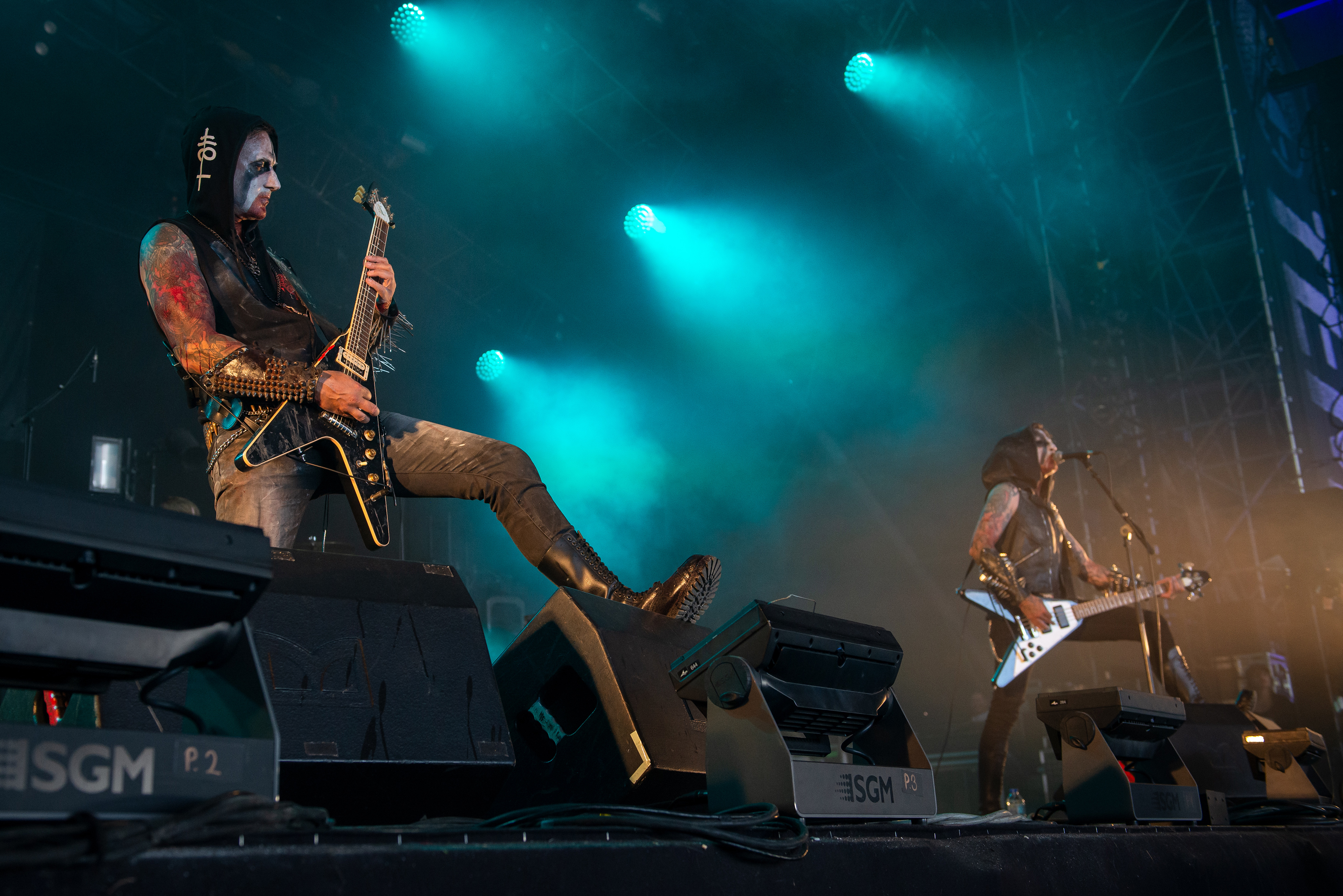
- Archgoat performing at Hellfest 2022

Background information
- Origin: Turku, Finland
- Genres: War metal; black metal; death metal
- Years active: 1989–1993; 2004–present
- Labels: Necropolis, Hammer of Hate, Blasphemous Underground, Debemur Morti Productions
- Members: Lord Angelslayer; Ritual Butcherer; Diabolus Sylvarum

Archgoat is a Finnish blackened death metal band formed in 1989 by Sri Lankan-Finnish twin brothers Ritual Butcherer on guitar and Lord Angelslayer on bass and vocals. It was one of Finland's first black metal bands along with Barathrum, Impaled Nazarene and Beherit. The members of Archgoat identify with the philosophy of Satanism and the occult as expressed in their lyrical content, which also consists of anti-Christian themes.

== History ==
Archgoat is seen as one of the most influential metal bands from Finland. Archgoat were formed in 1989 in Turku, Finland, though they did not release their first recording, Jesus Spawn, until 1991. The band signed a contract with Necropolis Records in 1992. In 1993, their MLP, Angelcunt (Tales of Desecration), was released. Later that year, Archgoat entered into a full-time studio deal with Necropolis. However, after their recording sessions, a disagreement with the terms of their contract resulted in the band refusing to release the finished material to the public.

In 1993, Archgoat began a hiatus, citing their belief that they did not belong in a "commercial" black metal scene. The band did not reform until 2004, when they released their 1993 material as a 7-inch EP, Angelslaying Black Fucking Metal, through Hammer of Hate Records. Their First Live Black Mass concert was recorded in Finland in 2005. Sinister Karppinen became the band's permanent drummer at this time. Their debut LP, Whore of Bethlehem, was released in September 2006, and they embarked on a European tour in spring 2007 with Black Witchery. A live split of this tour was released as Desecration & Sodomy in 2008. In 2020, the band released the live album Black Mass XXX. Commemorating 30 years of live performances, it was recorded at Debemur Morti Productions' Servants Of Chaos showcase on 28 September 2019. It was released on 10 April 2020.

In July 2015, it was announced that drummer Sinister Karppinen left the band and was replaced with VnoM.

== Discography ==
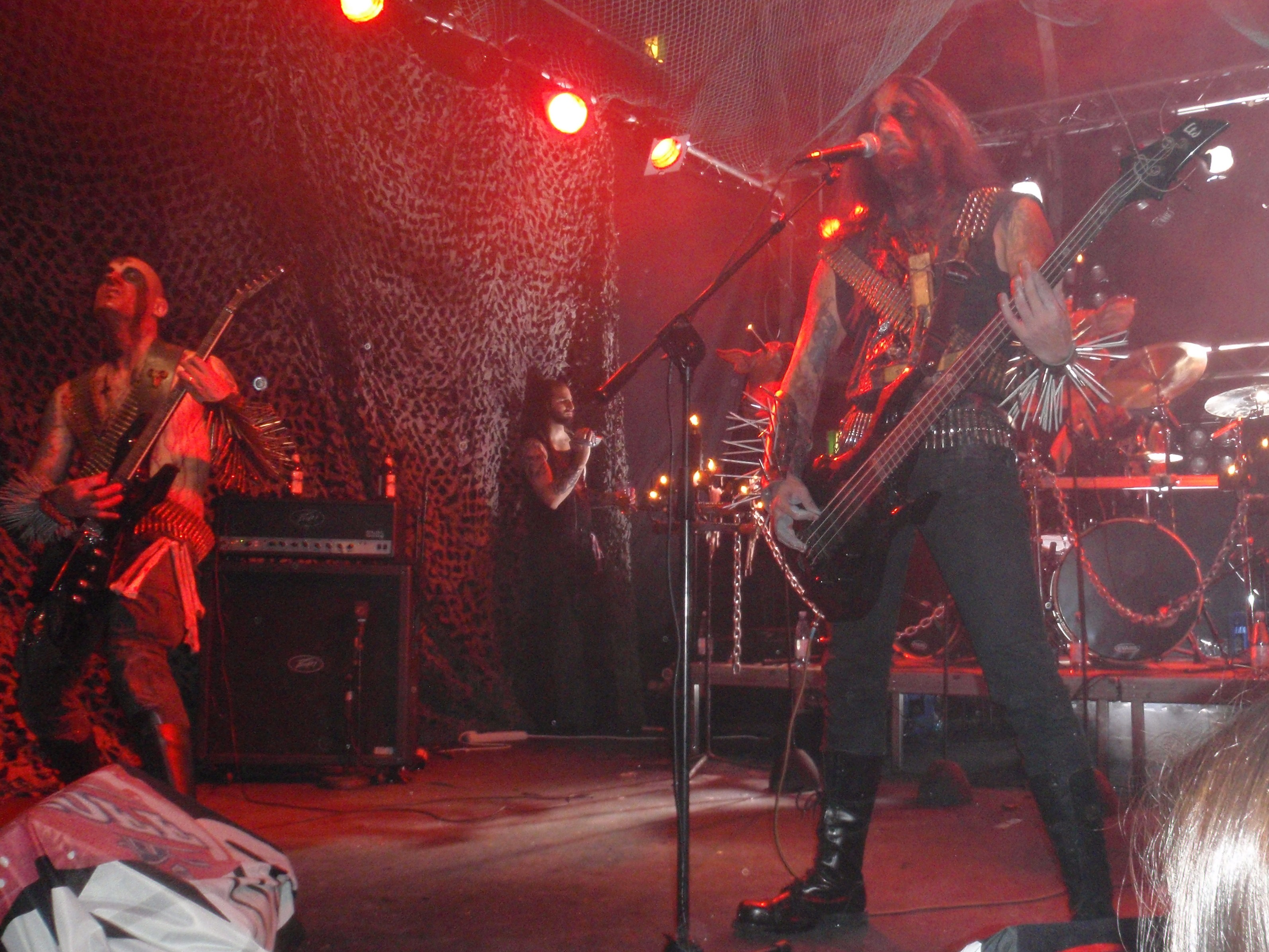
Archgoat performing in 2009

=== Studio albums ===
- Whore of Bethlehem (2006)
- The Light-Devouring Darkness (2009)
- The Apocalyptic Triumphator (2015)
- The Luciferian Crown (2018)
- Worship the Eternal Darkness (2021)
- Nightbringer, Lightbringer (2026)

=== EPs ===
- Angelcunt (Tales of Desecration) (1993)
- Angelslaying Black Fucking Metal (2004)
- Heavenly Vulva (Christ's Last Rites) (2011)
- Eternal Damnation of Christ (2017)
- All Christianity Ends (2022)

=== Demos/promos ===
- Jesus Spawn (1991)
- Penis Perversor (1993)

=== Live albums ===
- Archgoat and Black Witchery (2008)
- Black Mass XXX (2020)

=== Split albums ===
- Messe Des Morts / Angel Cunt (1999) (with Beherit)
- Lux Satanae (Thirteen Hymns Of Finnish Devil Worship) (2015) (with Satanic Warmaster)

== Band members ==
=== Current members ===
- Angelslayer (Rainer Puolakanaho) bass, vocals – (1989–1993, 2004–present)
- Ritual Butcherer (Kai Puolakanaho) guitars, bass – (1989–1993, 2004–present)
- Goat Aggressor (Tuukka Franck) drums – (2017–present)

=== Former members ===
- Blood Desecrator (Tommi) drums – (1989–1993)
- Sinister Karppinen (Tuomas Karppinen) drums – (2005–2015)
- VnoM (Ville Markkanen) drums – (2015–2017)
- Diabolus Sylvarum (Risto Suomi) keyboards – (2014–2018)

=== Live members ===
- Leneth the Unholy Carnager drums – (2004–2005)
- Maggot Wrangler drums – (2015)
