= Beherit =

Finnish black metal band

- Also known as: The Lord Diabolus
- Origin: Rovaniemi, Finland
- Genres: Black metal, dark ambient, war metal (early)
- Years active: 1989–1996; 2008–present
- Label: Spinefarm Records
- Members: Nuclear Holocausto Vengeance; Sodomatic Slaughter; Ancient Corpse Desekrator; Abyss
- Past members: Black Jesus; Necroperversor; Kimmo Luttinen

Beherit is a Finnish black metal band from Rovaniemi. The band was formed in 1989 by Nuclear Holocausto Vengeance (Marko Laiho), Demonic Fornication (Jari Vaarala) and Sodomatic Slaughter (Jari Pirinen), to perform "the most primitive, savage, hell-obsessed black metal imaginable". According to a source, "Beherit" is a Syriac word for a devil. Through their uncommercial music, visuals, and live performances, the band attracted a cult following. Besides the "raw" sound, the band has an avant-garde side and an emphasis on atmosphere. Beherit are regarded as genre pioneers.

Beherit released one album and many demos and compilations of minimalistic black metal. They disbanded after the 1993 album Drawing Down the Moon, considered a genre classic. Frontman Laiho continued as a solo project and released two albums under the band's name, H418ov21.C in 1994 and Electric Doom Synthesis in 1996. These albums are categorized as dark ambient. Although completely electronic, the albums carried the band's black metal atmosphere. Original members Nuclear Holocausto and Sodomatic Slaughter reformed the band in 2008 with new members Ancient Corpse Desekrator and Abyss.

== History ==
=== Early days (1989–1990) ===
Beherit was founded in Rovaniemi, Lapland in 1989 as a three-piece consisting of vocalist and guitarist Nuclear Holocausto Vengeance (Marko Laiho), bassist Daemon Fornication and drummer Sodomatic Slaughter (Jari Pirinen). The band released three demos the following year—Seventh Blasphemy, Morbid Rehearsals, and Demonomancy—and gathered reputation for their live shows, which included pig heads and goats.

=== The Oath of Black Blood (1991–1992) ===
Beherit's compilation album, The Oath of Black Blood, includes material recorded from June to September 1990. The album was released in 1991. The album is traditional, fast, old-school black metal influenced by death metal, thrash metal, and grindcore. It is not a separately recorded studio album. The band's label at the time, Turbo Music, funded the recording, but the musicians supposedly spent the money on alcohol. The label released their demo Demonomancy and the 7-inch EP Dawn of Satan's Millennium as a compilation, without the band's permission, and named it The Oath of Black Blood, originally supposed to be the album's name. Laiho commented on the album in a 1992 interview for Metal Hammer magazine,

"I hate the album! It's so bad, we never wanted to release it. The songs are from our 'Demonomancy' demo and our label Turbo Music just used a regular cassette for the album pressing. Honestly, I never sent them the master tape... We're planning to release a proper LP soon, this time on my own label. The result should be much better."

The album is now regarded as a full-length release. Spinefarm Records re-issued it in 2005, and Season of Mist in 2006. In 1991, the band members briefly performed as The Lord Diabolus, from which a single demo tape was made and released independently before the band returned to working as Beherit. The songs "Intro (Tireheb)" and "Nocturnal Evil" were later re-released as Beherit songs.

=== Drawing Down the Moon (1993) ===
Beherit's best-known and influential album, Drawing Down the Moon, was recorded between April and August in 1992. It was released in 1993 as the band's first official LP. The album was named after a Wiccan ritual, "drawing down the Moon". The album was experimental within the black metal scene. The band used whispers and space-like electronic and synth sounds. Drawing Down the Moon was reissued by Candlelight Records in 2006.

=== Ambient era (1994–1996) ===
Despite the album's success, Drawing Down the Moon was the band's last black metal release, as they split up the next year. Laiho recorded two albums of dark ambient music, H418ov21.C and Electric Doom Synthesis, and released them under the band's name. As the band did not reform and Laiho had lost interest in black metal, he continued his dark ambient career as Suuri Shamaani and in hardcore techno as DJ Gamma-G.

=== Return to black metal, Engram (2009) ===
Beherit reformed in 2008 with original members Nuclear Holocausto and Sodomatic Slaughter, and newcomers Ancient Corpse Desekrator and Abyss. The new album returned to black metal, and marked Beherit's return to a full-band lineup after existing as a solo project from 1994 until its disbandment in 1996. The album, Engram, is the band's third black metal album, fifth overall, and first in 14 years.

A sixth album, Bardo Exist, was released in 2020. This album returned to black ambient.

== Conflicts ==
Beherit were one of the first second-wave black metal bands. In the early 1990s, due to Beherit and groups such as Impaled Nazarene and Barathrum, the Finnish scene was becoming more and more recognized. This eventually resulted in a Norwegian-Finnish conflict often named the "Dark War". According to Isten fanzine's obviously satirical article, the conflict originated from several misunderstandings and practical jokes, involving Laiho, but Mika Luttinen of Impaled Nazarene believed he received death threats in Norwegian. His band's first album had a statement saying "no orders from Norway accepted", which Luttinen later admitted being stupid and childish. Laiho commented on the conflict in an interview for January 1994 issue of Masters of Brutality magazine:

"When we started the band about 4 years ago we knew this and so that's okay. Now there are more people against us ‘cause of these new rules and all these stupid rumours spread by our Norwegian enemies... but I don’t care so much. But that’s a bit sad that the black metal underground scene is totally split."

== Band members ==
=== Current members ===
- Nuclear Holocausto (Marko Laiho of Black Crucifixion) – vocals, guitars, keyboards, programming (1989–1996, 2008–present)
- Sodomatic Slaughter (Jari Pirinen of Black Crucifixion) – drums (1989–1991, 2008–present)
- Ancient Corpse Desekrator (Sami Tenetz) (Thy Serpent) – guitars (2008–present)
- Abyss (Pasi Kolehmainen) – bass (2008–present)

=== Former members ===
- Black Jesus (Santtu Siippainen) (ex. Coffin) – bass (1991–1992)
- Daemon Fornication/Demon Fornication (Jari Vaarala) – bass (1989–1990)
- Kimmo Luttinen (of Catamenia, Impaled Nazarene, The Black League) – drums
- Necroperversor (Pekka Virkanen) (ex. Coffin) – drums (1991–1992)

== Discography ==
=== Albums ===
- Drawing Down the Moon (1993)
- H418ov21.C (1994)
- Electric Doom Synthesis (1995)
- Engram (2009)
- At the Devil's Studio 1990 (2011)
- Bardo Exist (2020)
- WBRRR (2023)

=== Compilations ===
- The Oath of Black Blood (1991)
- Beast of Beherit - Complete Worxxx (1999)

=== EPs and demos ===
- Seventh Blasphemy (1990)
- Morbid Rehearsals (1990)
- Demonomancy (1990)
- Dawn of Satan's Millennium (1990)
- Diabolus Down There (alternately, Down There..., released under the band name The Lord Diabolus, 1991)
- Unreleased Studio Tracks (1991)
- Promo 1992 (1992)
- Messe des morts (1994)
- Celebrate the Dead (2012)

=== Splits ===
- Beherit / Death Yell (1991)
- Messe des morts / Angel Cunt (1999) (with Archgoat)
