= Blackened death metal =

Fusion genre of black metal and death metal

- Stylistic origins: Death metal; black metal
- Cultural origins: Early-to-mid-1990s, Central Europe; Scandinavia; North America

Subgenres
- Melodic black-death; war metal

Other topics
- Melodic death metal; blackened death-doom

Blackened death metal (also known as black death metal) is an extreme subgenre of heavy metal that fuses elements of black metal and death metal.

The genre emerged in early 1990s when black metal bands began incorporating elements of death metal and vice versa. The genre typically employs death growls, tremolo picking, blast beats, and Satanic lyrics and imagery. Bands of the genre typically employ corpse paint, which was adapted from black metal.

== Characteristics ==
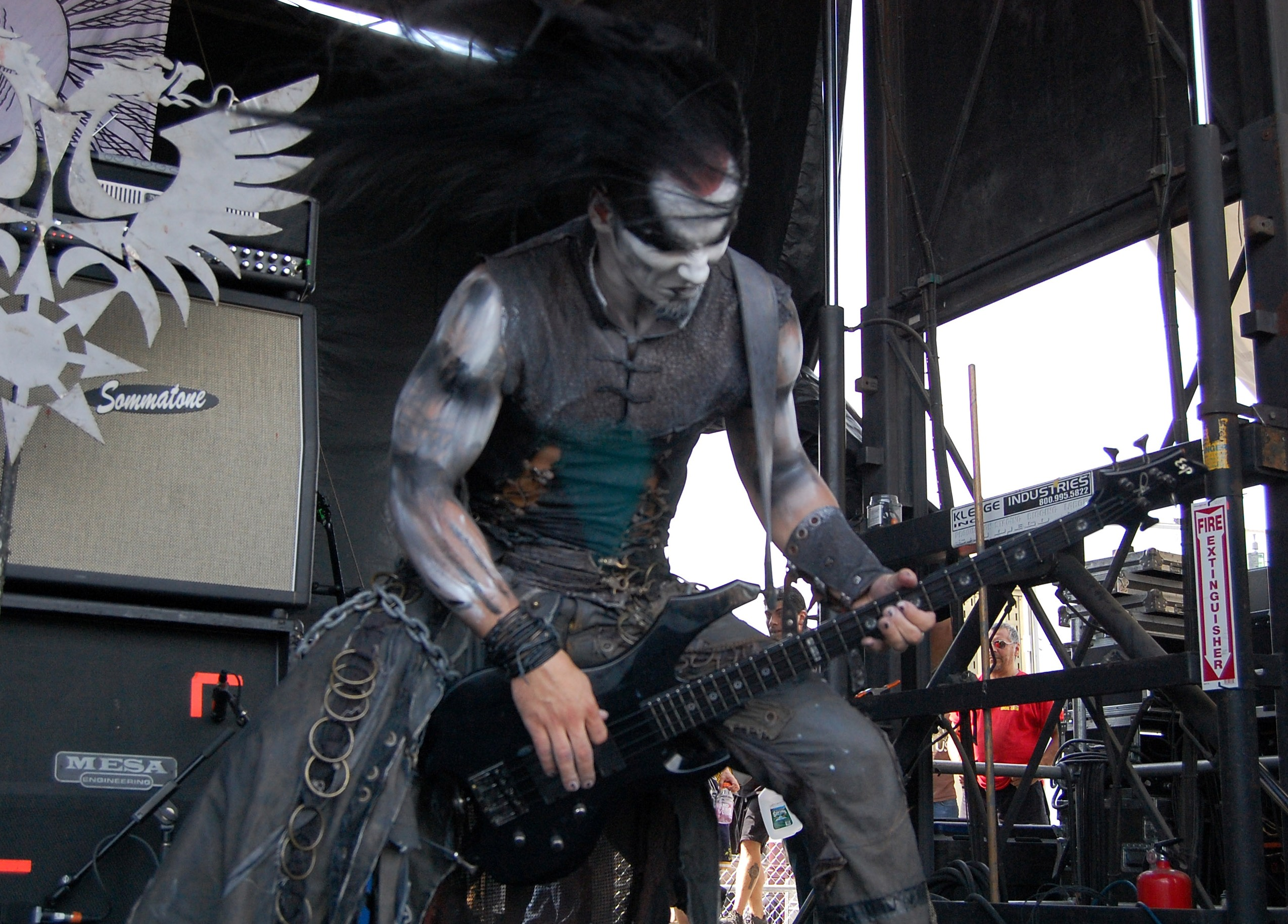
Orion, bassist of Behemoth performing 2009.

The genre is commonly defined as death metal, which incorporates musical, lyrical or ideological elements of black metal, such as an increased use of tremolo picking, anti-Christian or Satanic lyrical themes and chord progressions similar to those used in black metal. Blackened death metal bands are also more likely to wear corpse paint and suits of armour, than bands from other styles of death metal. Lower range guitar tunings, death growls and abrupt tempo changes are common in the genre. Some blackened death metal bands, such as Goatwhore and Angelcorpse, even take significant influence from thrash metal.

== History ==
Both black metal and death metal evolved in the 1980s out of the same crop of early extreme metal bands such as Dark Angel, Possessed, Kreator, Sodom, Venom, Celtic Frost and Bathory, leading to common elements between the genres being in place.

Early death metal groups possessing certain elements in common with black metal include early Sepultura, Morbid Angel, and Deicide. John McEntee, guitarist and vocalist of death metal band Incantation, has noted that he and his band draw influence from black metal. Seminal black metal band Darkthrone began playing death metal before evolving into the style they would primarily become known for.

Blasphemy fused death metal and black metal on their debut album Fallen Angel of Doom, giving way to the development of war metal. Dissection evolved out of the Gothenburg melodic death metal scene, embracing black metal influences into their music and helping create melodic black-death thanks to their 1993 album The Somberlain.

The year 1998 saw the release of Behemoth's album Pandemonic Incantations, striking a stylistic change in the sound of the band's output from a traditional black metal style with generally pagan lyrical themes into a more death metal influenced sound with lyrics about the occult and Satan. After continuing this style, their 2000 album Thelema.6 peaked at number 31 on the Polish Albums Charts. Many of Behemoth's subsequent albums would continue to chart, with Demigod peaking at number 15, The Apostasy at number 9, and Evangelion and The Satanist both at number one, with multiple albums charting worldwide. American band Skeletonwitch's third, fourth and fifth albums peaked at numbers 151, 153 and 62, respectively, on the Billboard 200 charts.

Thy Art Is Murder, a band which previously played deathcore, moved into a style more similar to blackened death metal on their fourth album Dear Desolation, charting in eight different territories, including a peak at number five on the Australian Albums Charts and number seven on the New Zealand Heatseekers Albums. Similarly, New Jersey's Lorna Shore also began to tread into blackened death metal territory with their sophomore album "Flesh Coffin".

== Stylistic divisions ==
=== Melodic black-death ===
Melodic black-death
- Other names: Blackened melodic death metal; melodic blackened death metal
- Stylistic origins: Melodic death metal; black metal
- Cultural origins: Early to mid-1990s, Scandinavia (particularly Sweden)

Melodic black-death (also known as blackened melodic death metal or melodic blackened death metal) is a genre of extreme metal that describes the style created when melodic death metal bands began being inspired by black metal and European romanticism. However, unlike most other black metal, this take on the genre incorporates an increased sense of melody and narrative. Additionally, the use of the reverberation effect on the vocals is more common in this style. Some bands known to have performed the style include Dissection, Sacramentum, Naglfar, Dawn, Unanimated, Thulcandra, Skeletonwitch, and Cardinal Sin.

Sweden's Dissection evolved alongside melodic death metal bands such as At the Gates and In Flames, by building upon the musical foundation laid by death metal and incorporating guitar melodies and harmonies amongst the standard brutality of the genre. However, unlike the other bands, Dissection began incorporating influences from black metal into their music, which lead to their debut album The Somberlain influencing a plethora of subsequent bands and Metal Injection dubbing them "one of the most important extreme metal bands of all time". Sacramentum's debut and second albums Far Away from the Sun and The Coming of Chaos would then continue Dissection's style of black metal-infused melodic death metal, based around middle of the neck guitar riffing and howling vocals, while Vinterland would lean even more upon their black metal predecessors like Norway's Emperor. Naglfar would base their sound primarily within that of Gothenburg metal bands like In Flames and Dark Tranquility, by taking a brighter and thrashier take on the style.

=== War metal ===
War metal
- Other names: Bestial black metal; war black metal
- Stylistic origins: First wave black metal; death metal; grindcore
- Cultural origins: Late 1980s to early 1990s, Brazil, Canada, Finland

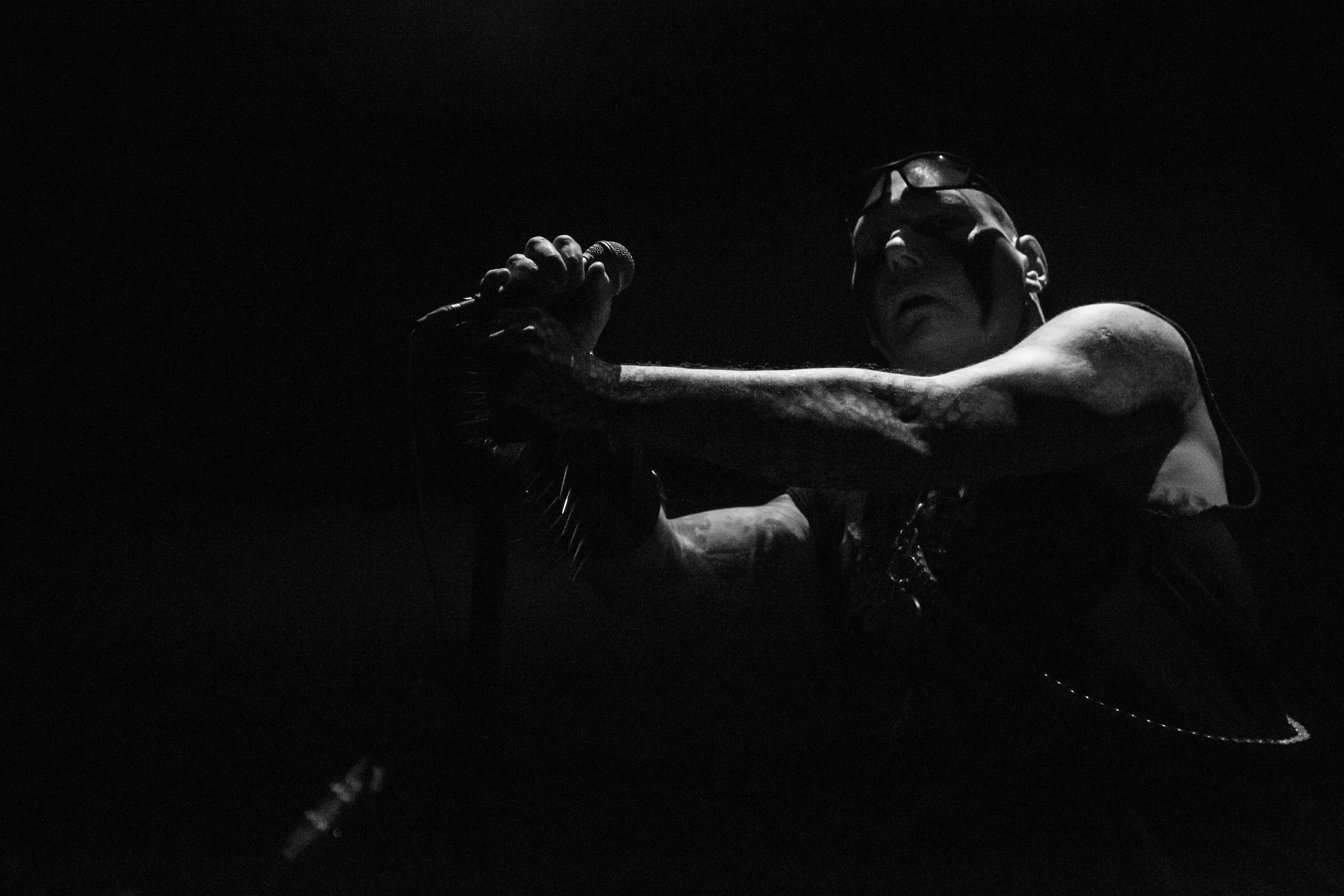
Pioneering war metal band Blasphemy performing in 2017

War metal (also known as war black metal or bestial black metal) is a genre derived primarily from first-wave black metal, while incorporating elements of death metal and grindcore. It is aggressive, cacophonous and chaotic and includes musical characteristics including tremolo picking, blast beats, growled or screamed vocals and lo-fi production.

Brazilian band Sarcófago's debut album I.N.R.I. (1987), was a major influence upon the development of the genre.

The genre was pioneered by Canadian band Blasphemy on their debut album Fallen Angel of Doom (1990). Kansas City, Missouri band Order from Chaos and many of the acts on the record label Ross Bay Cult were also early proponents in the genre. The genre quickly developed a scene in Australia, with Sadistik Exekution and Bestial Warlust. It was the members of Bestial Warlust who coined the name "war metal". At this time, the Finnish scene was home to war metal bands Archgoat and Beherit.

Other notable acts in the genre include Revenge, Diocletian, Teitanblood, Black Witchery, Axis of Advance, Goat Semen, Impiety, In Battle and Zyklon-B.

== See also ==
- List of blackened death metal bands
- List of war metal bands
