= Live Legacy =

Live album by Dissection
- Released: 2003
- Recorded: 8 August 1997; Wacken Open Air, Germany
- Genre: Melodic black metal
- Length: 40:09
- Label: Nuclear Blast

Dissection chronology
Where Dead Angels Lie (1996)	Live Legacy (2003)	Maha Kali (2004)

Frozen in Wacken cover

Professional ratings
Review scores
Source	Rating
AllMusic	link
Collector's Guide to Heavy Metal	7/10

Live Legacy is a live album by Swedish black metal band Dissection, released in 2003 by Nuclear Blast. It was recorded during a show at the Wacken Open Air festival in Germany on 8 August 1997. It was first released as a bootleg called Frozen in Wacken, which featured the art of romantic painter Antoine Wiertz on the cover. The bootleg also includes the song "Night's Blood" that was omitted from the official release due to errors in the recording.

The Limited Boxset (1,000 pieces) also contains the "Gods of Darkness – Live" DVD and CD is taken from the Dimmu Borgir/Dissection video "Live & Plugged Vol. 2" as well as a "Live Legacy" poster flag.

== Track listing ==
No.	Title	Length
1.	"Intro - At the Fathomless Depths"	1:56
2.	"Retribution – Storm of the Light's Bane"	5:09
3.	"Unhallowed"	6:36
4.	"Where Dead Angels Lie"	6:26
5.	"Frozen"	3:37
6.	"Thorns of Crimson Death"	8:21
7.	"The Somberlain"	8:01
Total length:		40:09

== Frozen in Wacken track listing ==
No.	Title	Length
1.	"At the Fathomless Depths/Night's Blood"	9:00
2.	"Unhallowed"	6:23
3.	"Frozen"	3:26
4.	"Where Dead Angels Lie"	6:19
5.	"Retribution - Storm of the Light's Bane"	5:06
6.	"Thorns of Crimson Death"	8:12
7.	"The Somberlain"	7:46
Total length:		46:12

== Credits ==
- Jon Nödtveidt – vocals, guitar
- Johan Norman – guitar
- Emil Nödtveidt – bass
- Tobias Kellgren – drums
