= The Past Is Alive (The Early Mischief) =

Compilation album by Dissection
- Released: 1997
- Genre: Melodic black metal
- Length: 34:18 / 45:30
- Label: Necropolis Records

Dissection chronology
Storm of the Light's Bane (1995)	The Past Is Alive (The Early Mischief) (1997)	Maha Kali (2004)

Professional ratings
Review scores
Source	Rating
AllMusic	link
Collector's Guide to Heavy Metal	7/10

The Past Is Alive (The Early Mischief) is a compilation album by Swedish black metal band Dissection. It contains tracks from early EPs and promos. It also includes two tracks by Satanized, the former band of Jon Nödtveidt. Some versions also include two tracks taken from the Where Dead Angels Lie EP. It has been released several times by different labels, including Necropolis Records who released it originally and Karmageddon Records. It also has been released with different cover artwork.

== Track listing ==
1. "Shadows over a Lost Kingdom" – 2:49
2. "Frozen" – 3:28
3. "Feathers Fell" – 0:52
4. "Son of the Mourning" – 3:25
5. "Mistress of the Bleeding Sorrow" – 4:39
6. "In the Cold Winds of Nowhere" – 4:01
7. "Into Infinite Obscurity" – 1:04
8. "The Call of the Mist" – 3:59
9. "Severed into Shreds" – 4:27
10. "Satanized" – 2:54 (by Satanized)
11. "Born in Fire" – 2:41 (by Satanized)
12. "Where Dead Angels Lie" – 6:10
13. "Elizabeth Bathory" – 5:03 (Tormentor cover)
