= The Somberlain =

Studio album by Dissection
- Released: 3 December 1993
- Recorded: 1–6 March 1993
- Studio: Hellspawn/Unisound
- Genres: Melodic black metal; melodic death metal
- Length: 45:38
- Label: No Fashion
- Producer: Dissection

Dissection chronology
Into Infinite Obscurity (1991)	The Somberlain (1993)	Storm of the Light's Bane (1995)

The Somberlain is the debut studio album by Swedish black metal band Dissection, released on 3 December 1993 by No Fashion Records. It went on to become a highly influential release in black metal as a foundational work for the subgenre known as melodic black metal. It is the only studio album with guitarist John Zwetsloot, who was fired a year later.

The band dedicated the album to Euronymous, who had been murdered in August the same year. This is the only album that features the band's original lineup. The artwork was created by Kristian "Necrolord" Wåhlin. The album was composed and arranged between 1989 and 1993, and was recorded between 1 and 6 March 1993.

== Music ==
Noticing similarities to death metal bands At the Gates, Sentenced and Necrophobic, Deathmetal.org stated that Dissection utilizes black metal's technique, but embraces a different aesthetic from that genre, lacking its "flow and inscrutability." According to No Clean Singing, "Dissection made their name by infusing their black metal with a layer of melody which ensured that each song was memorable, together with strong musicianship and compelling lyrics and imagery. By keeping most of their NWOBHM-isms in the minor scale, they maintained a sense of darkness and foreboding over the blasting, thrashing framework of technically-proficient black metal."

Kyle Ward of Sputnikmusic argued that "Dissection is known for combining intricate, harmonized guitar leads with the raw force of Black Metal", and that "while each song has its own melodic riffs respectively, there are some where the song is full of these melodic riffs, and vocals just as epic and melodic." He also noted the significant stylistic differences between this album and Dissection's following album, Storm of the Light's Bane. Metal Injection's Atanamar Sunyata wrote that "Dissection drew deeply from Bathory's legacy. Unlike their peers, however, Dissection looked beyond the atonal seethings of Under The Sign of the Black Mark, taking direction from Quorthon's later, more epic leanings." He described the album as "steeped in the sinister miasma of black metal's ethos", while noting that the band "discarded less of metal's traditional tropes than their contemporaries. Classical constructs guide the album's course and teeming thrash provides its foundation."

== Reissues ==
The album was reissued in 1997 by Nuclear Blast Records and again in 2004 by Black Lodge. Black Lodge also released a special edition set in 2005 limited to 666 copies, packaged in a wooden box along with a T-shirt and a sticker. The album was re-released most recently in 2006 by The End Records in a two-disc set, containing the original album, an unreleased live recording from 1995, the Into Infinite Obscurity EP from 1991, a demo from 1992, The Grief Prophecy demo from 1990, a rehearsal from 1990, and the Satanized rehearsal from 1990. All content is remastered, packaged in a slipcase, and is touted as the "Ultimate Reissue". The album was remastered from the original tapes by Håkan Åkesson at Cutting Room Studios in Stockholm.

== Reception ==
Professional ratings
Review scores
Source	Rating
AllMusic	3/5 stars
Collector's Guide to Heavy Metal	7/10
Sputnikmusic	4.5/5 stars

Though often overshadowed by the band's following album Storm of the Light's Bane, The Somberlain has been well received by music critics and fans. Blabbermouth wrote that the album was released "to critical acclaim and today the power and passion of that release still resonates as bright as it did back then", calling it an "instant classic".

Metal Injection called it an "essential" black metal album, writing that the album "is exploding with addictive, memorable hooks. Singular, unforgettable melodies overlay sinuous, quick-draw dynamics. Dual harmonies are perfectly executed in rapid-fire waves." They singled out the album's title track as "one of metal's greatest moments", describing the song as "delivering transformative, metal-thrashing transcendence." Kyle Ward wrote a detailed review of the album for Sputnikmusic, describing it as "unrelenting, epic, melodic, heavy, somber, brutal, emotional, and technical all in one". He also argued that "For most band's [sic], a CD like this would be their masterpiece, but with Dissection, it's just another album, not to mention their debut."

Deathmetal.org, however, asserts that the album's rock and roll moments keep it outside the "black metal canon", stating that although The Somberlain manages to create an atmosphere, it "falls short of finding a synthesis of feeling and action as underground black metal in its inventive era did."

In 2013, Decibel ranked The Somberlain at number 36 on its list of the Top 100 Black Metal Albums of All Time.

== Track listing ==
All lyrics are written by Nödtveidt.

Disc one (2006 reissue)
No.	Title	Music	Length
1.	"Black Horizons"	Nödtveidt, Zwetsloot	8:12
2.	"The Somberlain"	Nödtveidt	7:08
3.	"Crimson Towers"	Zwetsloot	0:50
4.	"A Land Forlorn"	Nödtveidt, Palmdahl	6:40
5.	"Heaven's Damnation"	Nödtveidt, Zwetsloot	4:42
6.	"Frozen"	Nödtveidt	3:48
7.	"Into Infinite Obscurity"	Zwetsloot	1:06
8.	"In the Cold Winds of Nowhere"	Nödtveidt, Zwetsloot	4:22
9.	"The Grief Prophecy/Shadows Over a Lost Kingdom"	Nödtveidt, Öhman	3:32
10.	"Mistress of the Bleeding Sorrow"	Nödtveidt, Zwetsloot	4:37
11.	"Feathers Fell"	Zwetsloot	0:41
Total length:			45:38

Disc two (2006 reissue)
No.	Title	Music	Length
1.	"Frozen (Live Recording '95)"	Nödtveidt	3:27
2.	"The Somberlain (Live Recording '95)"	Nödtveidt	7:27
3.	"Shadows over a Lost Kingdom (EP 1991)"	Nödtveidt, Öhman	2:50
4.	"Son of the Mourning (EP 1991)"	Nödtveidt, Öhman	3:24
5.	"Into Infinite Obscurity (EP 1991)"	Zwetsloot	1:05
6.	"Frozen (Demo 1992)"	Nödtveidt	3:28
7.	"In the Cold Winds of Nowhere (Demo 1992)"	Nödtveidt, Zwetsloot	4:00
8.	"Feathers Fell (Demo 1992)"	Zwetsloot	0:53
9.	"Mistress of Bleeding Sorrow (Demo 1992)"	Zwetsloot	4:18
10.	"The Call of the Mist (Demo 1990)"	Nödtveidt	3:59
11.	"Severed into Shreds (Rehearsal 1990)"		4:27
12.	"Satanized (Rehearsal 1991)"		2:53
13.	"Born in Fire (Rehearsal 1991)"		2:39
Total length:			44:50

== Personnel ==
- Jon Nödtveidt – vocals, lead guitar, rhythm guitar, acoustic guitar
- John Zwetsloot – rhythm guitar, classical guitar
- Ole Öhman – drums
- Peter Palmdahl – bass guitar
- Necrolord – cover artwork
- Dan Swanö – recording engineer
