= Cardinal Sin (band) =

Swedish extreme metal band

Background information
- Origin: Gothenburg, Sweden
- Genres: Melodic black-death, thrash metal
- Years active: 1995–1996, 2003–2006
- Label: Wrong Again
- Members: Dan-Ola Persson; John Zwetsloot; Magnus "Devo" Andersson; Alex Losbäck; Jocke Göthberg

Cardinal Sin was a Swedish melodic black/melodic death metal band formed in 1995 by ex-Dissection member John Zwetsloot. In 1996, they released the four-track EP Spiteful Intents, which featured a classical composition by Zwetsloot. They disbanded after the EP and reformed in 2003 with a partially new lineup, but have yet to release another recording.

Metal Hammer journalist Robert Müller wrote that since the group focused around guitarists John Zwetsloot and Devo Andersson, there were no doubts about the technical quality, though the EP's sound was "established and all too well-known".

== Members ==
- Dan-Ola Persson – vocals
- John Zwetsloot – rhythm guitar
- Magnus "Devo" Andersson – lead guitar
- Alex Losbäck – bass
- Jocke Göthberg – drums

== Discography ==
- Spiteful Intents (EP, 1996)
