= Temple of the Black Light =

Satanic occult order

One of the principal symbols used by the Temple of the Black Light

The Temple of the Black Light, formerly the Misanthropic Luciferian Order (MLO; Swedish: Misantropiska Lucifer Ordern), is a Satanic occult order founded in Sweden in 1995. It originally was part of the True Satanist Horde founded by Tony Särkkä, but became an independent organization due to ideological differences. In 1997, leading members engaged in the murder of Josef ben Meddour. In 2002, it published a grimoire, the Liber Azerate, detailing its ideology and cosmogony.

== Beliefs ==
The Temple of the Black Light believes in what they titled "Chaosophy," they believe in the Biblical creation account of Adam and Eve and the existence of the Abrahamic God, that according to them created the universe, but unlike followers of the Abrahamic faiths, they instead reject that God and want to see this creation not to have taken place, and wish to destroy it or cause its non-existence through magic and rituals. They believe that chaos is an infinidimensional and pandimensional plane of possibilities, in contrast to cosmos which only has three spatial dimensions and one linear time dimension. They also believe that, in comparison with the linear time of cosmos, chaos can be described as timeless in the way that it is not contained nor limited by one-dimensional time, and formless, because of its ever-changing and infinite number of space dimensions.

Militant neo-Gnosticism and misanthropy is taught within the group, and they say that the true Satanist must not be a part of the modern society, as it is founded upon lies. They say the very fabric of this reality is a lie that hinders chaos from realizing itself.

These are the three dark veils before Satan, in their belief system seen as the three forces that were expelled from Ain Sof in order to make way for the manifestation of the "Black Light" in the "outer darkness" that soon became Sitra Ahra:

- 000 - Tohu - Formless chaos: Qemetiel ("crown of gods")
- 00 - Bohu - Emptiness/Nothingness: Beliaal ("without god")
- 0 - Chasek - Darkness: Aathiel ("uncertainty")

These three powers can be seen as the burning trident held high above the Thaumielitan. These three powers can also be viewed as wrathful reflections of Ain, Ain Soaf, and Ain Soaf Aur.

== Criminal activities ==
In the summer of 1997, Josef ben Meddour was murdered by Khoshnood-Sharis (Note: Then named Nemesis Khoshnood-Sharis, born Shahin. Also uses the pseudonyms Vlad, Falxifer and Nemidial.) and his accomplice Nödtveidt. The act was described by police as a homophobic hate crime. When Nödtveidt and Khoshnood-Sharis were arrested for the crime on December 15 and 18, 1997, respectively, police discovered satanic altars in the homes of the two suspects. A human skull was also found at Khoshnood's home, for which he was charged with the possession of human body parts. According to law enforcement, the cult never had more than a handful of followers.

During their investigation, police interrogated an early former member of the Temple of the Black Light, as well as Khoshnood-Sharis's girlfriend, who had reported him for aggravated domestic abuse. She described the organisation and their occult ceremonies, which included meditation, invocations of demons, and animal sacrifices—namely cats, which Khoshnood-Sharis bought through classified ads. During the weeks preceding Meddour's murder, Khoshnood-Sharis's rhetoric grew more extreme, including discussion of human sacrifices followed by a mass suicide. During a meeting at Nödtveidt's home, the pair drew up a list of possible victims, which included a former Temple follower, band members from Dissection, and even Nödtveidt's girlfriend.

These plans led to the defection of other members of the Temple of the Black Light, who did not want to take part in a murder, or who feared for their own lives. As a result, when the arrests were made, the number of active members was down to three: Nödtveidt, Khoshnood-Sharis, and Khoshnood-Sharis's girlfriend.

== History ==
The Temple of the Black Light has been influenced in part by the British Order of Nine Angles.

The Temple of the Black Light was originally part of the True Satanist Horde founded by Tony Särkkä but became an independent organization due to ideological differences. It originally had three members, Shahin "Vlad" Khoshnood, Jon Nödtveidt, and Johan Norman. While Norman joined the order around the same time as Nödtveidt, he left after the other members expressed interest in committing violent acts. Khoshnood-Sharis's girlfriend later became a supporting member, and two others also briefly joined the group, marking the height of its membership. As a sign of allegiance, the three founding members each got tattoos of a so-called "vampire pentagram" symbol designed by Khoshnood-Sharis.

In 2002, the Temple of the Black Light released Liber Azerate, a modern grimoire written by Khoshnood-Sharis – who then held the title of Magister Templi and went by the nickname "Frater Nemidial" – in 2002. It was released on the internet in the Swedish and Norwegian languages. Azerate is the hidden name of the "eleven anti-cosmic gods" described in the book. A related musical work is the 2006 Dissection album Reinkaos, the lyrics of which were co-written by Khoshnood, and which Nödtveidt said was "based on the book Liber Azerate and the teachings of MLO." The Temple of the Black Light advocates an ideology it calls "Chaos-Gnostic Satanism," which it also refers to as "Current 218."

In 2010, Khoshnood-Sharis, writing under the pseudonym "N.A-A.218," released a second book named Liber Falxifer: The Book of the Left-Handed Reaper, which is the first of a series of books about Latin American death cults. It was published by Ixaxaar Publications in limited editions. In 2013, Khoshnood released The Book of Sitra Achra: A Grimoire of the Dragons of the Other Side, a book related to the Kabbalistic concept of the Qliphoth.

== See also ==
- Magical organization
