= John Zwetsloot =

Swedish guitarist

- Born: 30 January 1974 (age 52)
- Origin: Sweden
- Genres: Black metal, death metal
- Occupation: Guitarist
- Years active: 1989–present
- Formerly of: Dissection, Cardinal Sin, Nifelheim, The Haunted, Fuck You All

John Allan Zwetsloot (born 30 January 1974) is a Swedish guitarist who formerly played with black/death metal band Dissection. He later started his own band, Cardinal Sin.

== Career ==
=== Dissection ===
In 1989, Dissection was looking for a final member to make the band a four-piece group. Mattias Johansson, their rhythm guitarist at the time, was just a session player and was not dedicated to the band. They found Zwetsloot and Dissection was formed, and later went to play their first show in 1991.

Zwetsloot brought a unique flavor to the band with his knowledge in classical music and theory helped the band form many of its dual harmonies. He was the rhythm guitarist while Nödtveidt played the harmonies as the lead guitarist. He came to be the main composer for most of the songs on the album, behind Nödtveidt. He also brought his knowledge and technique of classical guitar to the table, composing three short solo tracks and interludes for the songs. His solos compositions for the band include: "Crimson Towers", "Into Infinite Obscurity", and "Feathers Fell". The latter two have had various arrangements featured on other Dissection albums. The end of "Heaven's Damnation" contains a brief classical arrangement of the song's main melody, this is also composed and played by him.

When the band played live shows or rehearsed to work on the new album, Zwetsloot showed up late or skipped meetings altogether. He caused the band to cancel gigs because of his absence. Due to him not taking the band as seriously as the other members did, he was eventually fired. In 1994, he was replaced by Johan Norman. Though he was not a part of Dissection for their second album, Storm of the Light's Bane, he shares writing credits on two of the songs. Nödtveidt and Norman became the primary songwriters for the band after Zwetsloot's departure.

=== After Dissection ===
Having left Dissection after The Somberlain, he played for Nifelheim from 1994 to 1998. He also started his own band, Cardinal Sin, in 1995. In typical Zwetsloot fashion, he composed a classical piece for Cardinal Sin's only EP. The band split in 1996, but returned for sometime in 2003.

Zwetsloot was also the original lead guitarist of The Haunted from August to September 1996. Zwetsloot, as "John John", was also a guitarist in the Norwegian band Fuck You All from 2002 to 2009.

== Discography ==
=== Dissection ===
Studio releases

- The Somberlain (1993)

Other releases

- The Grief Prophecy (demo, 1990)
- Into Infinite Obscurity (7-inch EP, 1991)
- Untitled (demo, 1992)

=== Cardinal Sin ===
- Spiteful Intent (EP, 1996)
- Promo (demo, 1995)
