= Stridsyfirlysing =

Striðsyfirlýsing

Studio album by Vondur
- Released: 1995
- Recorded: Helvete Studion, 1995
- Genre: Black metal
- Length: 48:56
- Language: Icelandic
- Label: Necropolis
- Producer: It

Vondur chronology
Striðsyfirlýsing	The Galactic Rock N' Roll Empire (!996)

Striðsyfirlýsing is an album by the Swedish black metal band Vondur. It was released in 1995 by Necropolis Records. The title means "Declaration of War" in Icelandic.

The booklet contains a modification of the "Stop the Madness Campaign" against the use of hard drugs, used by Roadrunner Records in the 1980s. "Never Stop the Madness: Drugs are no fun. Drugs endanger the life and happiness of millions. It must never stop. We appeal in particular to the youth of today. Don't stop the madness. There are better things in life.

Vondur support the never stop the madness campaigns for the use of hard drugs. Join us."

Vondur plays untuned.

The album cover artwork contains an image of Darth Vader along with a squad of imperial stormtroopers.

== Track listing ==
1. "Kynning - Einvaldnir er her" – 1:24
2. "Dreptu allur" – 1:45
3. "Uppruni vonsku" – 3:36
4. "Kynning - Fjórði ríku" – 4:12
5. "Fjórði ríkins uppgangur" – 3:26
6. "I eldur og drumur" – 2:57
7. "Vondur" – 2:38
8. "Hrafnins auga er sem speglar á botni af Satans svartasalur" – 3:17
9. "Eitt bergmál ur framtiðinnar dagar" – 3:38
10. "Kirkjur skola brenna" – 2:03
11. "Sigurskrift" – 2:29
12. "Guð er dáinn" – 3:17
13. "Ekki Krist - Opinberun I & II" – 3:31
14. "Èg daemi oss til dauða" – 2:57
15. "Ekki nein verður saklaus" – 2:00
16. "Beitir hnifar skera djupur" – 3:29
17. "Höfðingi Satan" – 3:07

== Credits ==
- It (Tony Särkkä) - All guitars, bass guitar, vocals on track 16, violin, talk, additional vocals on tracks 2, 9, 12, handwriting
- All (Jim Berger) - Vocals, talk on track 7
- Irata - Drums
- Michael Bohlin - Synthesizers
- Desire - Female talk, photos
- Alexandra Balogh - Piano on tracks 7, 17, Logo design
