= Ophthalamia =

Swedish black metal band

- Origin: Stockholm, Sweden
- Genres: Melodic black metal, doom metal
- Years active: 1989–1998
- Label: No Fashion
- Past members: IT; Night; Bone; All; Mist; Shadow; Legion; Winter; Mourning

Ophthalamia was a Swedish black metal/doom metal band formed in Stockholm in 1989. The band released three studio albums before splitting up in 1998. Members of the band included guitarist IT (Tony Särkkä), guitarist and bassist Night (Emil Nödtveidt), drummer Bone (Ole Öhman), and vocalist Shadow (Jon Nödtveidt).

== History ==
Singer All (Jim Berger) and guitarist IT (Tony Särkkä) formed Ophthalamia in 1989. Both were members of Abruptum and Vondur. The band name comes from an elaborate fantasy world that IT created. Most of the band's songs are connected to this fictional world.

Their debut album, A Journey in Darkness, was released in 1994, followed by their sophomore album, Via Dolorosa, in 1995. In 1997, the band released the compilation To Elishia. The following year, they released A Long Journey, a re-recorded version of their debut album, and their third studio album, Dominion. Unlike the band's fantasy-inspired material, the lyrics on Dominion were inspired by Macbeth. Ophthalamia split up in 1998.

Former vocalist Shadow (Jon Nödtveidt) died by suicide in 2006. Founder and guitarist IT died in 2017. The compilation II Elishia II was released in 2019.

== Members ==
=== Final line-up ===
- IT (Tony Särkkä) – guitar, vocals (1989–1998; died 2017)
- All (Jim Berger) – vocals (1989–1994, 1996–1998)
- Night (Emil Nödtveidt) – guitar, additional vocals (1995–1998), bass (1995–1996)
- Mist (Mikael Schelén) – bass (1996–1998)
- Bone (Ole Öhman) – drums, percussion (1997–1998)

=== Former members ===
- Shadow (Jon Nödtveidt) – vocals (1992–1994; died 2006)
- Legion (Erik Hagstedt) – vocals (1994–1995)
- Mourning (Robert Ivarsson) – bass, additional vocals (1991–1994), guitar (1989–1991)
- Winter (Benny Larsson) – drums, vocals (1989–1996)

=== Live members ===
- Mäbe (Mattias Johansson) – guitar

=== Session members ===
- Day Disyraah (Dan Swanö) – guitars, vocals (1994)
- Axa (Alexandra Balogh) – piano, vocals (1994, 1995)

== Discography ==
Studio albums

- A Journey in Darkness (1994)
- Via Dolorosa (1995)
- A Long Journey (1998)
- Dominion (1998)

Compilation albums

- To Elishia (1997)
- II Elishia II (2019)
