= The Nocturnal Silence =

Studio album by Necrophobic
- Released: July 26, 1993
- Recorded: March 1993
- Studio: Sunlight (Sweden)
- Genre: Blackened death metal
- Length: 45:12
- Label: Black Mark

Necrophobic chronology
The Call (1992)	The Nocturnal Silence (1993)	Spawned by Evil (1996)

Professional ratings
Review scores
Source	Rating
AllMusic	3/5 stars

The Nocturnal Silence is the first studio album recorded by Swedish death metal band Necrophobic.

The album was recorded and mixed at Sunlight Studios, Stockholm, Sweden in March 1993. It was produced by Necrophobic and Tomas Skogsberg and engineered by Tomas Skogsberg and Lars Liden.

AllMusic gave the album three stars out of five.

== Track listing ==
No.	Title	Length
1.	"Awakening..."	4:25
2.	"Before the Dawn"	4:22
3.	"Unholy Prophecies"	5:42
4.	"The Nocturnal Silence"	5:13
5.	"Inborn Evil"	4:54
6.	"The Ancients Gate"	5:31
7.	"Sacrificial Rites"	4:52
8.	"Father of Creation"	6:02
9.	"Where Sinners Burn"	4:11
Total length:		45:12

== Line-up ==
- Anders Strokirk: vocals
- Tobias Sidegard: bass
- David Parland: guitars, keyboard
- Joakim Sterner: drums
