= Necrophobic =

Swedish black/death metal band

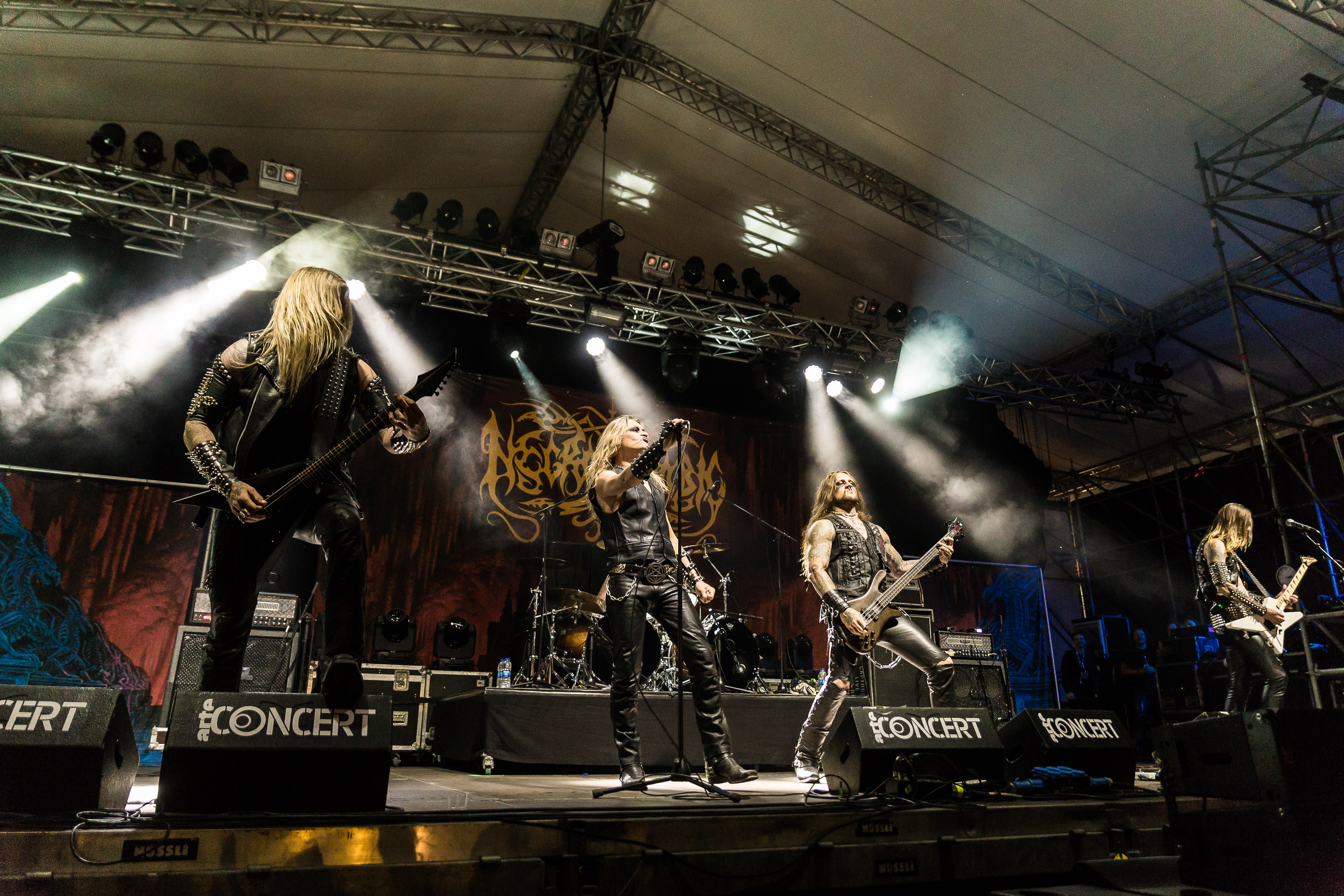
- Necrophobic in 2018

Background information
- Origin: Stockholm, Sweden
- Genre: Blackened death metal
- Years active: 1989–present
- Labels: Regain, Season of Mist, Black Mark Production, Century Media
- Members: Anders Strokirk; Sebastian Ramstedt; Johan Bergebäck; Tobias Cristiansson; Joakim Sterner
- Website: necrophobic.net

Necrophobic is a Swedish blackened death metal band formed in 1989 in Stockholm.

== History ==
The band was formed in 1989 by drummer Joakim Sterner and late guitarist David Parland. It is believed that the band name comes from a Slayer song from the 1986 album Reign in Blood. The pair played with a revolving door of musicians until the permanent addition of bassist Tobias Sidegård prior to recording their debut 7-inch single, The Call, in early 1992.

This lineup plus singer Anders Strokirk, who replaced Stefan Harrvik (who sang on the Unholy Prophecies demo and The Call 7-inch EP), the band entered Sunlight Studio in March 1993 and recorded their debut album, The Nocturnal Silence. The band had worked with the Wild Rags label and store for its singles.

Following the addition of second guitarist Martin Halfdahn, Necrophobic released a four-song extended play, Spawned by Evil, in 1996. This was a teaser for the full-length release, Darkside, which came out later that same year. This album featured a guest appearance by Jon Nödtveidt of Dissection on the song "Nailing the Holy One". The Third Antichrist was released in fall 2000 through Black Mark Production. A switch to Hammerheart Records led to Bloodhymns. In 2006, Necrophobic released Hrimthursum on Regain Records/Candlelight USA, and Death to All was issued in May 2009 and won the title of "Album of the Month" on the Metallian.com webzine. This album was the band's second album for Regain Records. Necrophobic also released Satanic Blasphemies on Regain Records, which is a compilation of their early material. The Slow Asphyxiation and Unholy Prophecies demos are featured, as well as The Call 7-inch EP.

The band announced the album Womb of Lilithu, released on October 25, 2013, in Europe and October 29, 2013, in the United States.

In July 2020, the band announced the release of their album Dawn of the Damned on October 9.

Necrophobic's tenth studio album, In the Twilight Grey, was released on March 15, 2024.

== Musical style and lyrics ==
Necrophobic are a blackened death metal band. Jason Ankeny of AllMusic described Necrophobic's sound as "punishing" and "uncompromising." The band's lyrics explore themes relating to anti-Christianity and Viking mythology.

== Band members ==
Necrophobic at Dark Troll Open Air 2023

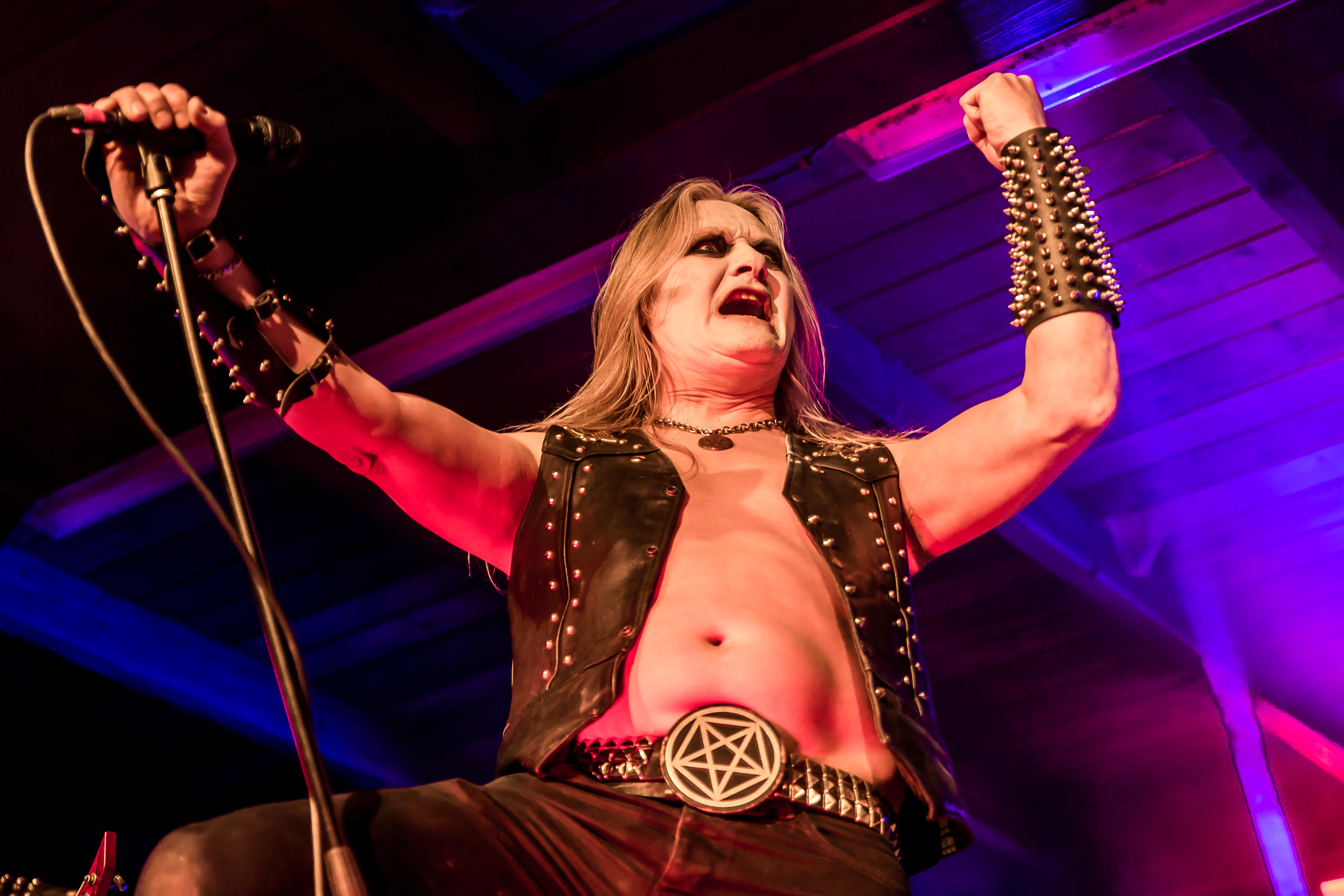
Anders Strokirk

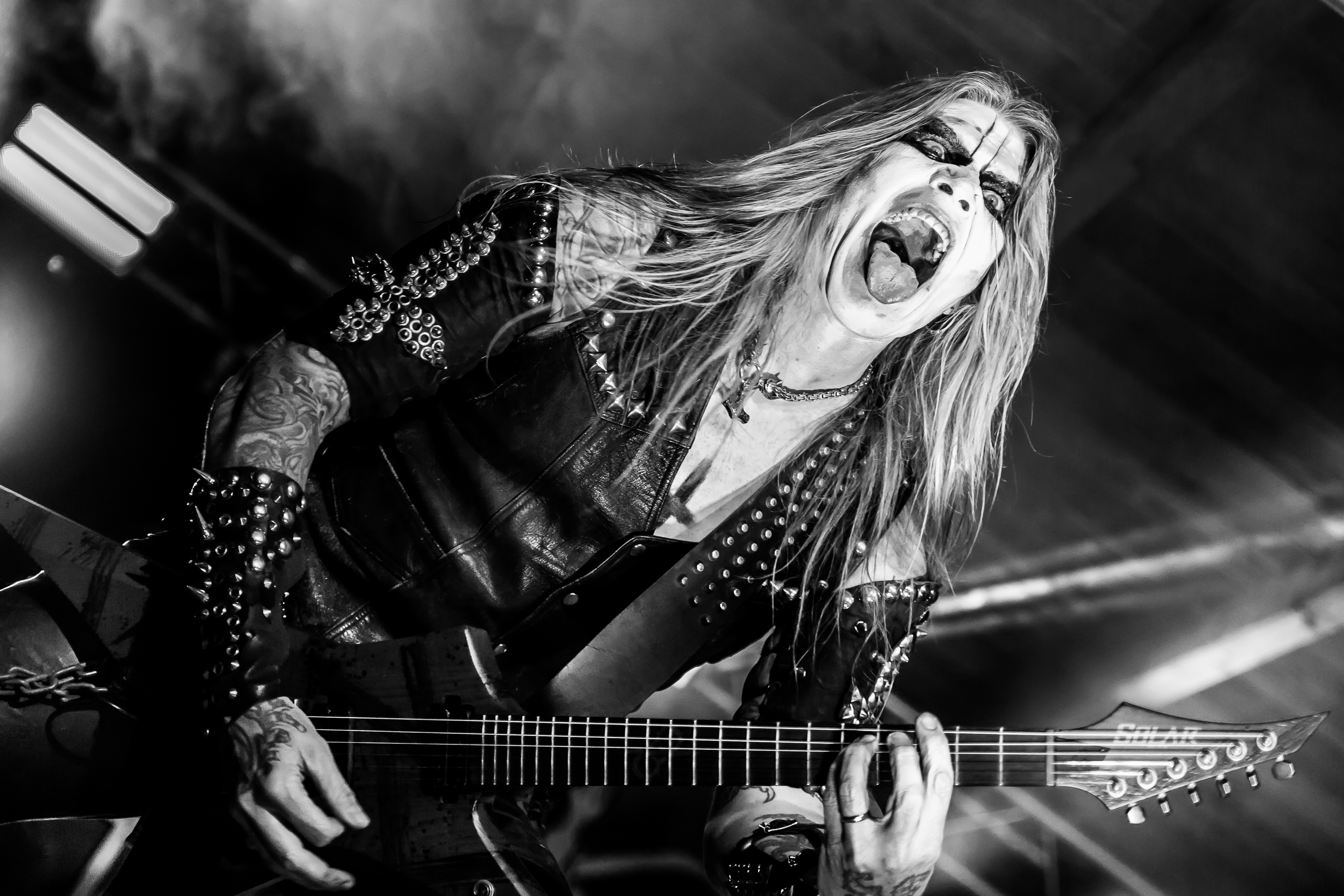
Sebastian Ramstedt

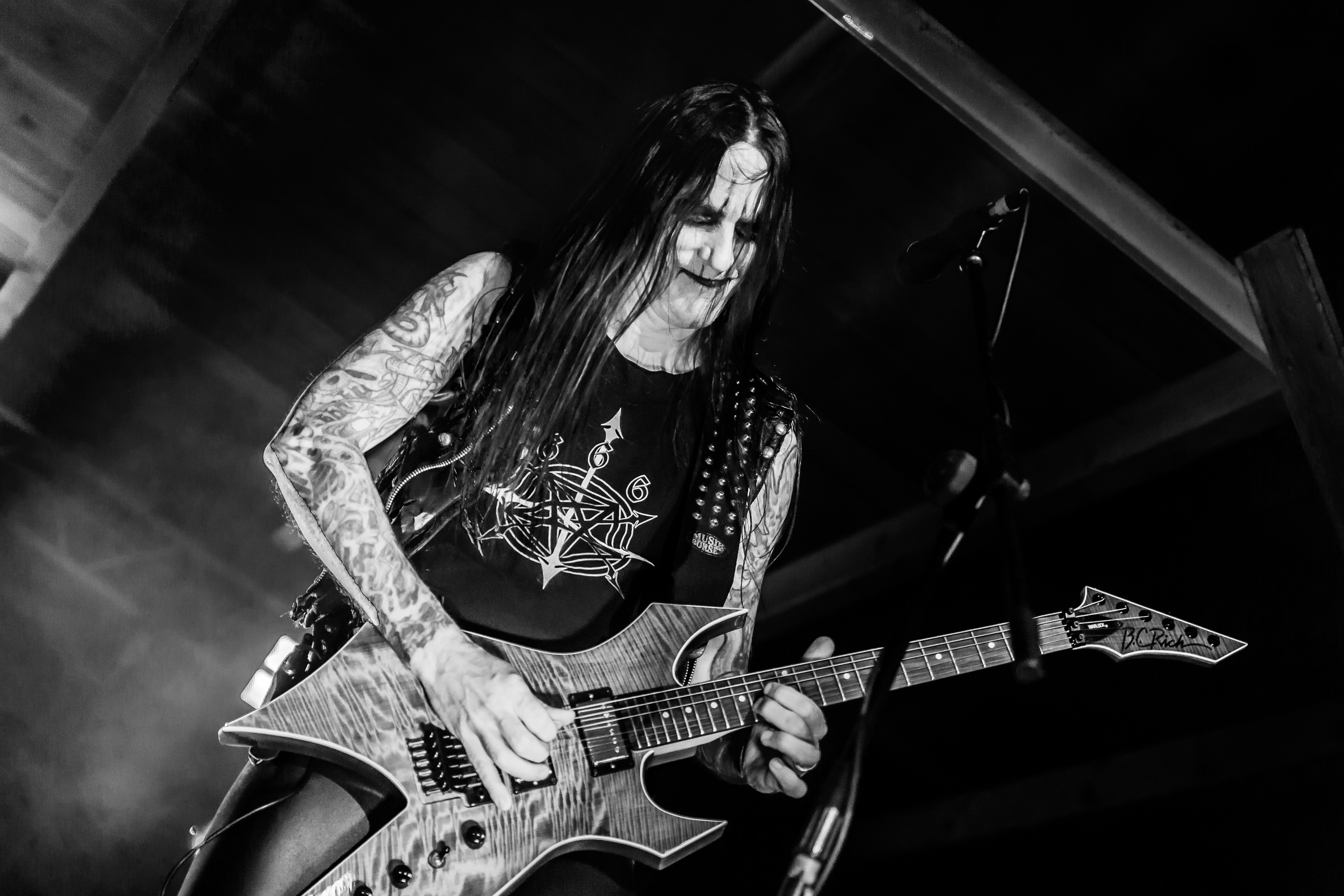
Johan Bergebäck

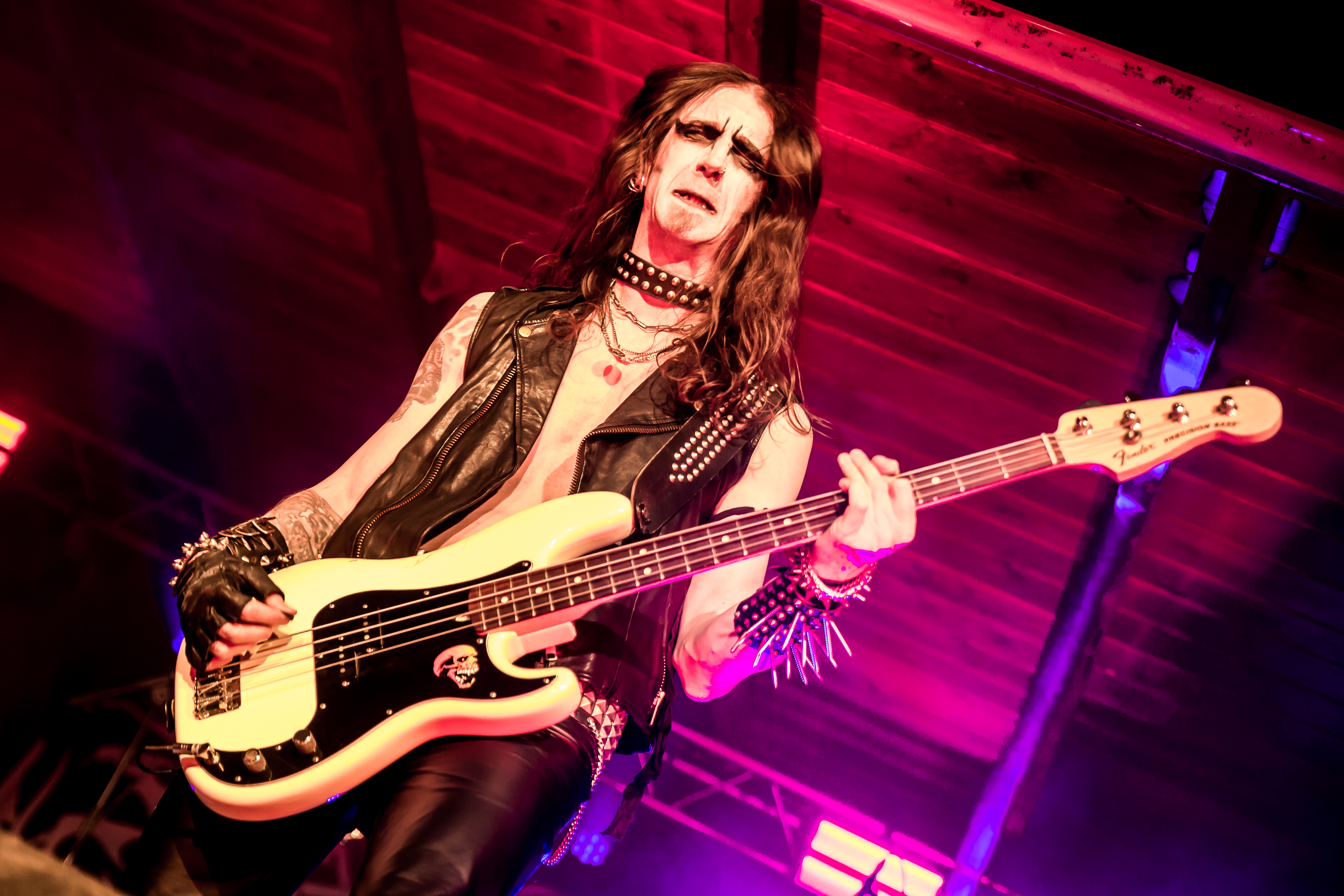
Tobias Cristiansson

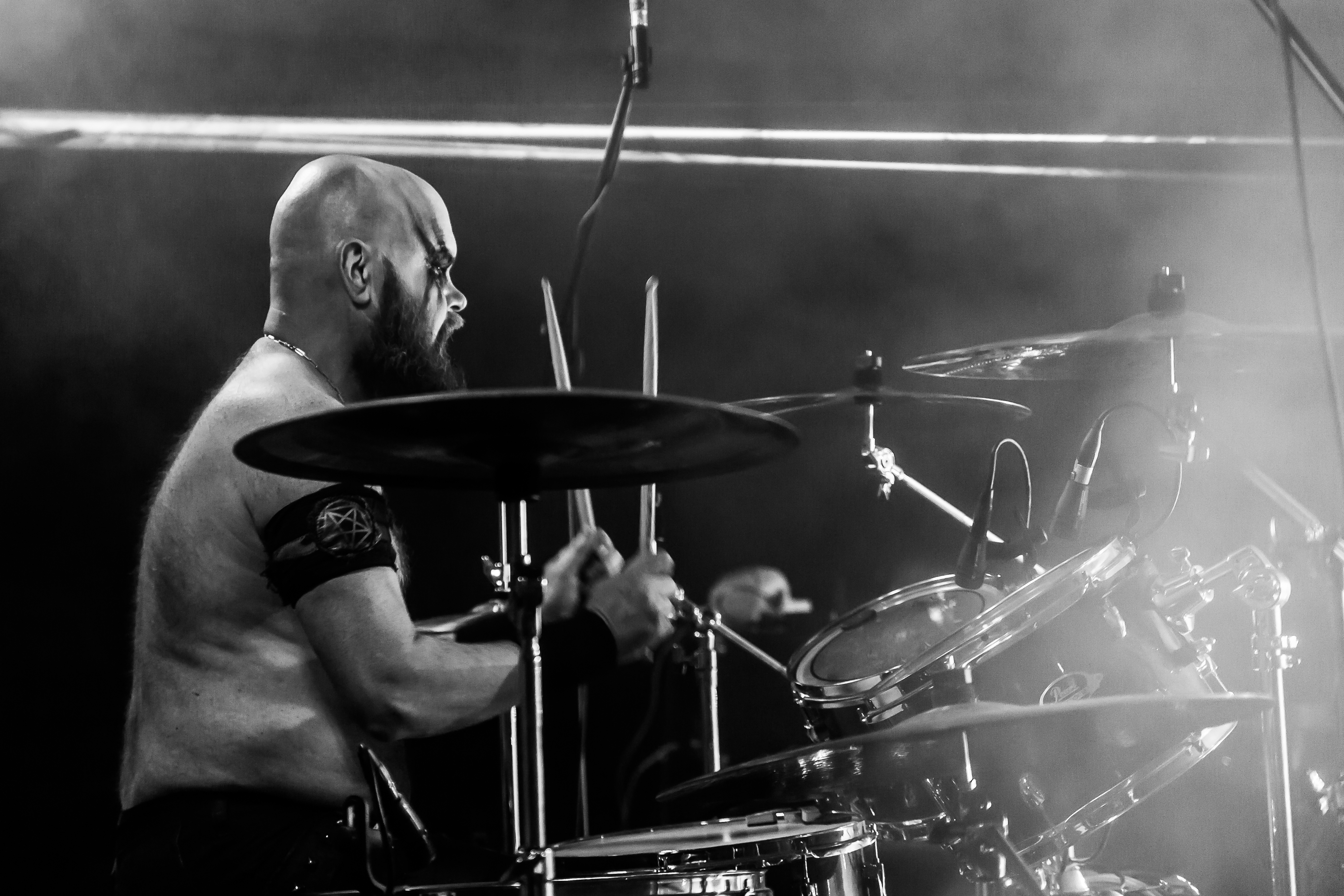
Joakim Sterner

Current members

- Joakim Sterner – drums (1989–present)
- Anders Strokirk – vocals (1993–1994, 2014–present)
- Sebastian Ramstedt – guitar (1996–2011, 2016–present)
- Johan Bergebäck – guitar (2001–2011, 2016–present)
- Tobias Cristiansson – bass (2022–present)

Former members

- David Parland – guitar (1989–1996; died 2013)
- Stefan Zander – vocals, bass (1989–1990)
- Stefan Harrvik – vocals (1990–1993), bass (1990–1991)
- Tobias Sidegård – vocals (1994–2013), bass (1991–2007), guitar (2011–2013)
- Martin Halfdan – guitar (1994–2000)
- Fredrik Folkare – guitar (2011–2016)
- Alex Friberg – bass (2008–2019)
- Allan Lundholm – bass (2019–2021)

Timeline

== Discography ==
=== Albums ===
- The Nocturnal Silence (1993)
- Darkside (1997)
- The Third Antichrist (1999)
- Bloodhymns (2002)
- Hrimthursum (2006)
- Death to All (2009)
- Womb of Lilithu (2013)
- Mark of the Necrogram (2018)
- Dawn of the Damned (2020)
- In the Twilight Grey (2024)

=== EPs ===
- The Call (1993)
- Spawned by Evil (1996)
- Tour EP 2003 (2003)
- Nordanvind (2025)

=== Demos ===
- Slow Asphyxiation (1990) on Witchhunt Records - Believe in Church and Agonize
- Retaliation (1990) on Witchhunt Records - Believe in Church and Agonize
- Unholy Prophecies (1991)

=== Other ===
- Satanic Blasphemies - Compilation (2008)
- Satanic Blasphemies - Boxed Set (2008)
- Satanic Prophecies - Remastered Boxed Set (2018)
