= Vondur =

Swedish black metal band

Vondur was a black metal band from Sweden. It was made up of members of the bands Ophthalamia and Abruptum, "It" (Tony Särkkä) and "All" (Jim Berger). The sound could be described as primitive black metal, though rumors have claimed that this was conceived as a joke band. They released one full-length album, Stridsyfirlysing, and an EP, The Galactic Rock N' Roll Empire, both on the now defunct Necropolis Records. The EP contained two new songs, cover versions of songs by Bathory, Judas Priest, Mötley Crüe and Elvis Presley and a re-recorded version of two songs "Dreptu Allur" and "Hrafnins Auga Er Sem Speglar Á Botni Af Satans Svartasalur", here translated from the Icelandic to the English "Kill Everyone" and "The Raven's Eyes Are as Mirrors of the Bottom of Satan's Black Halls".

== Discography ==
=== Demos ===
- 1994 Uppruni Vonsku (self-released)

=== Albums ===
- 1995 Stridsyfirlysing (Necropolis Records)

=== EPs ===
- 1996 The Galactic Rock N' Roll Empire (Necropolis Records)

=== Compilations ===
- 2011 No Compromise (Osmose Productions)
