= Hrimthursum =

Studio album by Necrophobic
- Released: May 22, 2006
- Genre: Blackened death metal
- Length: 59:02
- Label: Regain
- Producer: Necrophobic, Fredrik Folkare & Anders Bentell

Necrophobic chronology
Bloodhymns (2003)	Hrimthursum (2006)	Death to All (2009)

Professional ratings
Review scores
Source	Rating
Allmusic	3.5/5 stars

Hrimthursum is the fifth full-length album by Swedish blackened death metal band Necrophobic. It was released on Regain Records in 2006.

== Track listing ==
No.	Title	Writer(s)	Length
1.	"The Slaughter of Baby Jesus"	Tobias Sidegård	3:15
2.	"Blinded by Light, Enlightened by Darkness"	Sebastian Ramstedt	4:03
3.	"I Strike with Wrath"	Sidegård, Ramstedt	5:53
4.	"Age of Chaos"	Sidegård	5:51
5.	"Bloodshed Eyes"	Sidegård, Ramstedt	4:07
6.	"The Crossing"	Sidegård, Ramstedt	6:19
7.	"Eternal Winter"	Sidegård, Ramstedt	5:21
8.	"Death Immaculate"	Ramstedt, Johan Bergebäck	4:41
9.	"Sitra Ahra"	Sidegård, Ramstedt	5:56
10.	"Serpents (Beneath the Forest of the Dead)"	Ramstedt	3:45
11.	"Black Hate"	Sidegård, Ramstedt, Bergebäck	4:00
12.	"Hrimthursum"	Ramstedt, Sidegård, Joakim Sterner	6:03

== Personnel ==
- Tobias Sidegård: Vocals, Sampling, Bass
- Johan Bergebäck: Guitars
- Sebastian Ramstedt: Guitars
- Joakim Sterner: Drums

== Production ==
- Arranged by Necrophobic
- Produced by Necrophobic, Fredrik Folkare and Anders Bentell
- Recorded and engineered by Fredrik Folkare and Anders Bentell
