= Bloodhymns =

Studio album by Necrophobic
- Released: March 25, 2002
- Genre: Blackened death metal
- Length: 45:56
- Label: Karmageddon Media

Necrophobic chronology
The Third Antichrist (1999)	Bloodhymns (2002)	Hrimthursum (2006)

Professional ratings
Review scores
Source	Rating
Allmusic	3/5 stars

Bloodhymns is Necrophobic's fourth full-length studio album.

== Track listing ==
No.	Title	Length
1.	"Taste of Black"	3:32
2.	"Dreams Shall Flesh"	5:18
3.	"Act of Rebellion"	5:02
4.	"Shadowseeds"	4:56
5.	"Mourningsoul"	4:48
6.	"Helfire"	3:53
7.	"Cult of Blood"	5:08
8.	"Roots of Heldrasill"	4:37
9.	"Blood Anthem"	5:29
10.	"Among the Storms"	3:13
Total length:		45:56
