= Reinkaos =

Studio album by Dissection
- Released: 30 April 2006
- Studios: Black Horizon Music (via The End in North America)
- Genre: Melodic death metal
- Length: 43:06
- Label: Black Horizon

Dissection chronology
Storm of the Light's Bane (1995)	Reinkaos (2006)

Professional ratings
Review scores
Source	Rating
About.com	3/5 stars
AllMusic	3/5 stars
Blabbermouth.net	3/10
Chronicles of Chaos	6/10
Collector's Guide to Heavy Metal	6/10
Metal.de	7/10

Reinkaos (stylised as REINKAΩS) is the third and final studio album by Swedish extreme metal band Dissection. It was released through the band's own label Black Horizon Music, which they had formed "out of the need of taking charge of our own business and making things our own way, without compromise". Reinkaos is also available as autographed limited first edition: CD packed in exclusive embossed slipcase, limited to 1,001 hand-numbered copies signed by the band members; including the music video for "Starless Aeon" and a sticker.

== Musical style and lyrics ==
The album is less influenced by traditional black metal and closer to Gothenburg metal or traditional heavy metal than Dissection's former albums, but, according to Decibel journalist Chris D., still "very much Nödtveidt and very much Dissection". The lyrics reflect the occult tenets of the Misanthropic Luciferian Order (MLO) and are "based on invocations and formulas that have been linked into the lyrics to evoke the powers that they represent. Occult musical theory has been applied in the song writing process as a means of symbolically charging their structures. They have also been written inspired by scientific ideas such as string theory. The songs have all been written with the intention of using sounds and vibrations as an Anti-Cosmic tool and they have all been consciously created to be the vessels for these powers." In the grimoire Liber Azerate, released by the MLO, reinchaos is defined as "the return to chaos and acausal existence."

== Track listing ==
No.	Title	Length
1.	"Nexion 218"	1:32
2.	"Beyond the Horizon"	5:20
3.	"Starless Aeon"	3:59
4.	"Black Dragon"	4:48
5.	"Dark Mother Divine"	5:44
6.	"Xeper-i-Set"	3:09
7.	"Chaosophia"	0:41
8.	"God of Forbidden Light"	3:42
9.	"Reinkaos" (instrumental)	4:43
10.	"Internal Fire"	3:20
11.	"Maha Kali"	6:04
Total length:		43:06

== Personnel ==
- Jon Nödtveidt − vocals, guitars
- Set Teitan − guitars, backing vocals
- Tomas Asklund − drums

=== Guest appearances ===
- Brice Leclercq − bass
- Additional vocals on "Maha Kali" by Nyx 218
- Additional backing vocals by Erik Danielsson and Whiplasher Bernadotte

== Charts ==
Chart performance for Reinkaos
Chart (2026)	Peak position
Swedish Physical Albums (Sverigetopplistan)	8
