= Abruptum =

Swedish black metal and dark ambient band

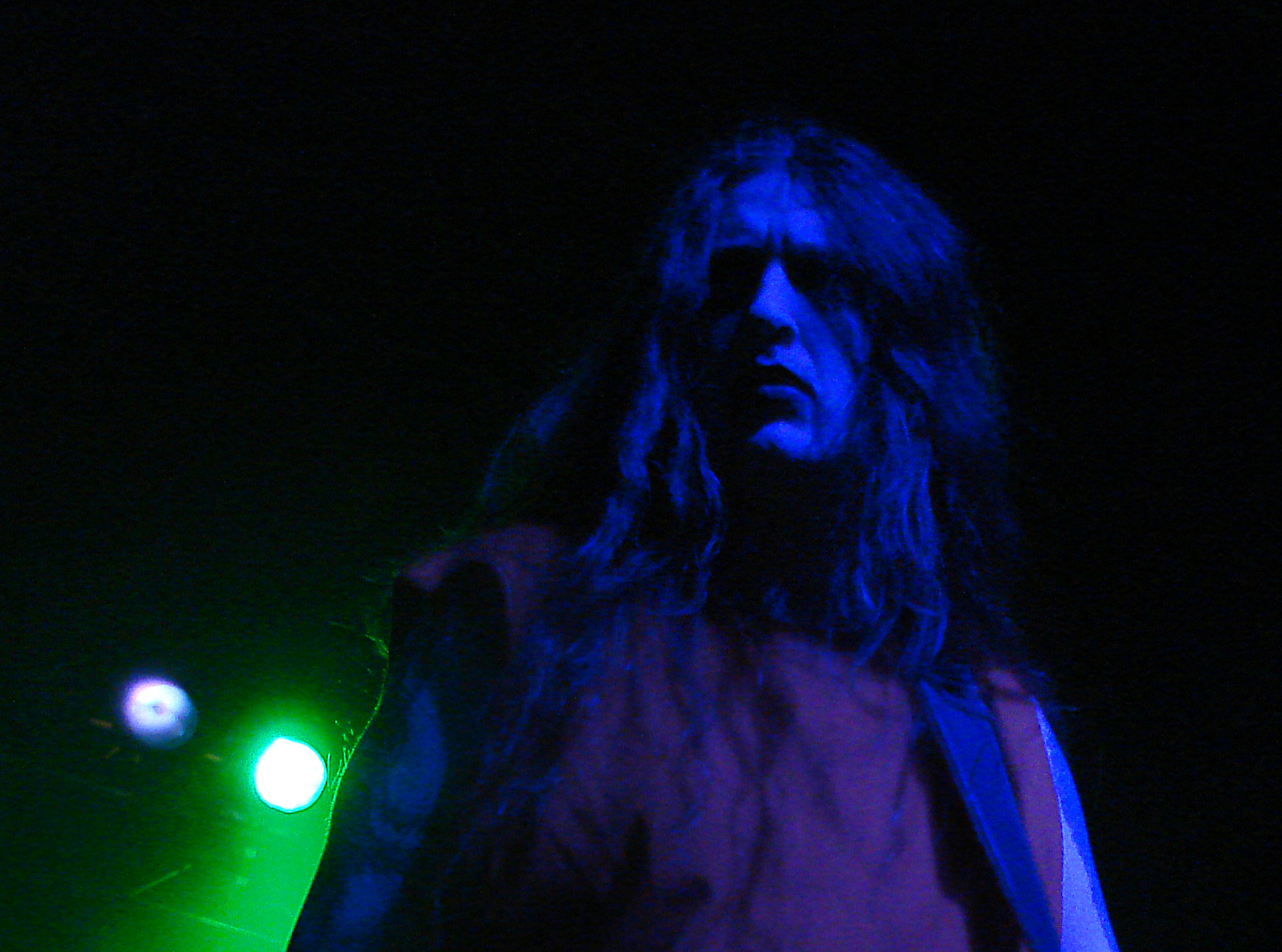
- Evil, the current sole member of the band, in 2007

Background information
- Origin: Finspång, Sweden
- Genres: Black metal; dark ambient; noise music
- Years active: 1989–2005; 2008–present
- Labels: Deathlike Silence; Southern Lord; Blooddawn Productions

Abruptum is a Swedish black metal and dark ambient band formed in 1989 by IT (a.k.a. Tony Särkkä), with All (a.k.a. Jim Berger), Ext and Evil (a.k.a. Morgan Steinmeyer Håkansson of Marduk) joining later. IT was one of the leaders of the True Satanist Horde, which was part of the Swedish black metal scene. Euronymous, co-founder of Mayhem and founder of Deathlike Silence Productions, described Abruptum as "the audial essence of pure black evil".

== History ==
IT had already planned to create the band in 1987, but it was not until 1990 that he found the right members to do it. The same year, they recorded their first two demos. After the release of the first demo, they fired their bass player, Ext. After the release of a 7-inch EP Evil in 1991 (later re-released by Psychoslaughter), All began to drink heavily and was forced to leave the band. IT then found a new member in "Evil". Around this time, IT reunited with All to form the side project, Vondur.

Abruptum was signed to Euronymous's label Deathlike Silence Productions, on which they released two albums. Euronymous described them as "the audial essence of pure black evil", and IT considered Euronymous to be "a true ally". After Euronymous's murder, Abruptum contributed the opening track to the compilation album Nordic Metal: A Tribute to Euronymous. Controversy surrounded Abruptum's close relationship with Euronymous, with Varg Vikernes specifically referencing Abruptum when recalling his version of the events and motives leading to the death of Euronymous. Vikernes, claiming that he killed Euronymous in self-defense, recalled in a 2006 interview:

(Euronymous) wanted to kill me for several reasons. I dumped his label, and by doing that left him with a label with only bands that sold extremely bad (Abruptum, and some other trash).

It has been wrongly rumored IT left the band and the black metal scene altogether in 1996, following numerous threats made to him and to his family. According to IT himself and his sister/manager, that was not at all the reason for his departure from the scene, as he had simply been wanting to leave for some time until he ultimately did. Evil kept Abruptum going and released material on his own record label, Blooddawn Productions, until 2005 when he announced that he had ended Abruptum.

Since Abruptum's disbanding, IT joined an industrial band called 8th Sin, and was briefly involved with the band (Total) War along with All. All worked with IT again in Ophthalamia, but they too eventually disbanded. IT eventually died on 8 February 2017, aged 44. Evil continues his work with Marduk and Death Wolf (formerly known as Devil's Whorehouse), yet brought Abruptum back in 2008, recording and releasing an EP ("Malediction") that same year and a full-length ("Potestates Apocalypsis") in 2011 under his Blooddawn Productions label.

== Music themes and style ==
While Abruptum is classified as a black metal/dark ambient band, the band took a different approach to their music. They did not focus on creating any structured songs, and mostly just made noise. Earlier material had shorter songs, but their later releases typically included one or two tracks with more than forty minutes of music. They primarily used standard drums, guitars, bass, keyboards, and other various instruments, but what stood out even more was the screaming, as the band supposedly tortured and cut each other during their recordings. Whether this is true or not has never really been verified. This led to Euronymous' now (in)famous distinction of Abruptum as "The Audial Essence of Pure Black Evil". After IT left the band, Evil shifted the band's musical style towards dark ambient/noise, dropping most of the metal sound.

== Members ==
=== Current member ===
Evil (Patrik Niclas Morgan Håkansson), Piano, Vocals, Programming (1993–1995, 2000–2005, 2008–present)

=== Former members ===
- It – Vocals, Guitars, Bass, Drums, Violin (1989–1997)
- All – Vocals (1990–1991)
- Ext – Bass (1990)

== Discography ==
- Abruptum (Demo, 1990)
- The Satanist Tunes (Demo, 1990)
- Evil (7-inch EP, 1991)
- Orchestra of Dark (Same as 'The Satanist Tunes' with additional 'Outro' added, 1991)
- Obscuritatem Advoco Amplectere Me (Deathlike Silence Productions, March 15, 1993)
  - Translation: "I call on obscurity to embrace me."
- In Umbra Malitiae Ambulabo, in Aeternum in Triumpho Tenebrarum (Deathlike Silence Productions, April 1, 1994)
  - Translation: "Walk in the shadow of evil, in the triumph of darkness forever."
- Evil Genius [First Two Demos and 7-inch EP on one CD; Hellspawn Records, 1995; remastered and re-reissued by Black Lodge Records and Southern Lord Records with a bonus track ('De Profundis Mors Vas Cousumet' from the Nordic Metal compilation) in 2007]
- Nordic Metal: A Tribute to Euronymous (Track Contribution: 'De Profundis Mors Vas Consumet', 1995)
- Vi Sonas Veris Nigrae Malitiaes (Full Moon Productions, 1997)
- De Profundis mors vas Consumet ('Nordic Metal' track + 2 Unreleased Tracks; Blooddawn Productions, 2000)
  - Translation: "Death from the deep vessel consumes"
- Casus Luciferi (Blooddawn Productions, March 15, 2004)
  - (Rough) Translation: "Lucifer's downfall"
- Maledictum (EP) (Blooddawn Productions, 2008)
  - Translation: "Curse"
- Potestates Apocalypsis (Blooddawn Productions, June 2011)
  - Translation: "Powers of the Apocalypse"

== See also ==
- Emit
- Marduk
