= Ramberget =

Mountain in Gothenburg, Sweden

Coordinates: 57°42′53″N 11°56′17″E

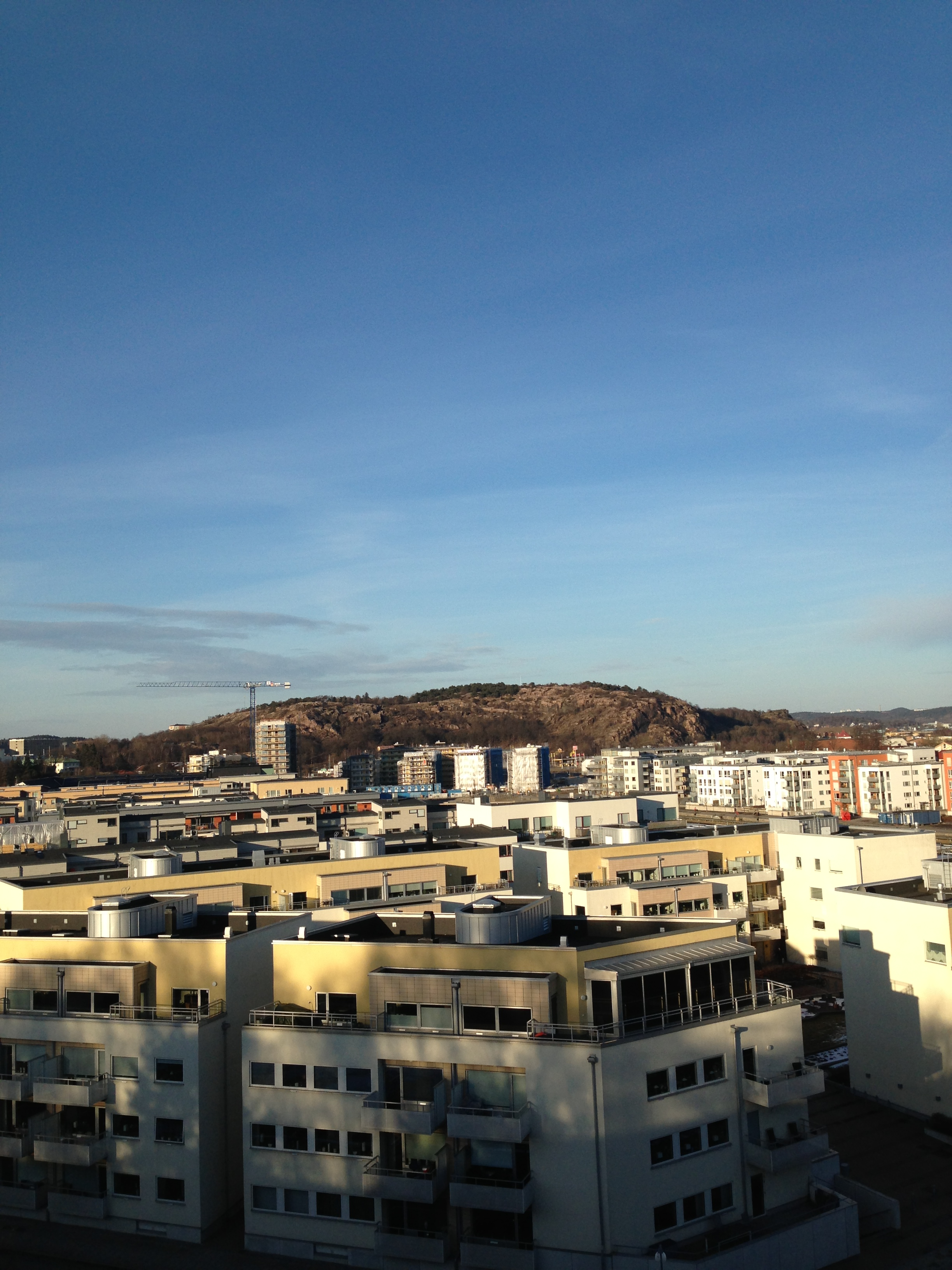
Ramberget as seen from Sörhallsberget, Gothenburg, 2013

Ramberget (Swedish pronunciation: [ˈrâmːˌbærjɛt]; English: "Raven Hill") is a hill on Hisingen island in Gothenburg, Sweden. The surrounding area and park is called Keillers Park. Ramberget is a popular tourist attraction and a place for outdoor recreation for Gothenburg residents, with walking paths, lookouts over the city of Gothenburg and artworks. Ramberget's highest point 87 metres (282 ft) above sea level, with a lower second point called Ättestupan. There is a road for cars going to the top of Ramberget. The park is about 31 hectares.

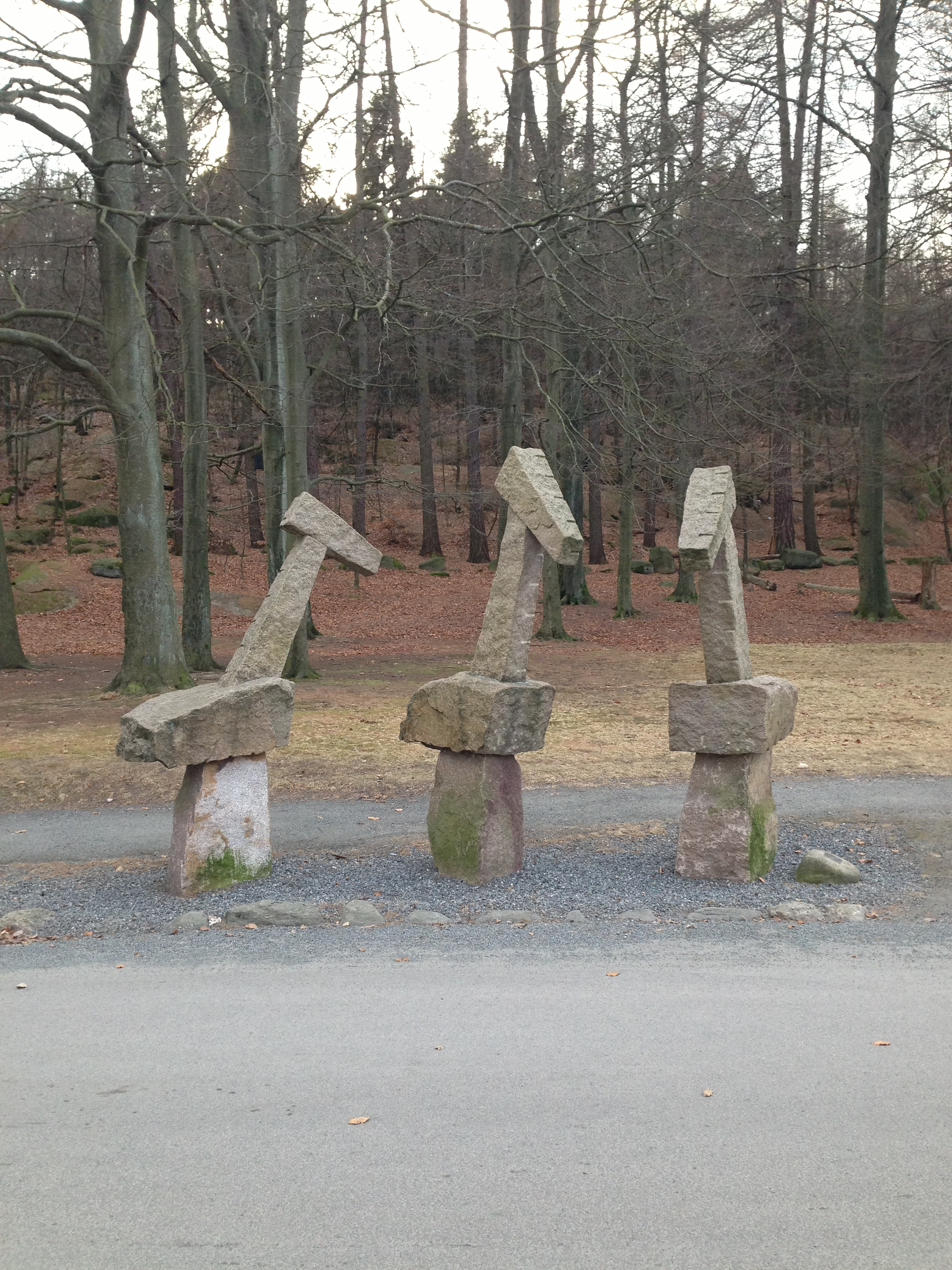
Tre gracer (Three graces) by Per Agélii in Keillers Park, Gothenburg, erected 2008

Ramberget got its characteristic shape already during the Ice Age 12,000 years ago. The northeast slope is flat while the south side has a higher cliff that is clearly visible from the river. The ice sheet has left traces both in the rock faces and through boulders in the area. Ramberget got its name of the old Swedish word "ram" which means raven. Ravens are still nesting on Ramberget. Until the early 1800s, when it wood was still widely used as fuel, there were no trees on Ramberget which instead was covered with heather, later replanting made the wood grow back and today there is a lush vegetation of beech, larch, pine and oaks. Most of the north shore of the river, including the area around Ramberget, was owned in the early 1900s by the Keiller family. Alexander Keiller, who came to Gothenburg from Scotland, had in the 1840s started a mechanical workshop that would later evolve into shipbuilding group Götaverken. During the recession of the 1860s, however, the company went into bankruptcy and after reorganization Alexander's son James Keiller begame the new manager. After some setbacks, including a severe fire in 1898, James decided to pull back and in 1906 he sold almost all of the business. At the same time he donated the area around Ramberget to the city, with the condition that the area should be used and remain as a natural park. The deed of gift is that only buildings that are "for the park's care or the visiting public homelike" may be erected, with the exception of water reservoirs.

Keillers Park was designed in a National Romantic style, partly by Eugen Thorburn who also designed Kungsportsbron in central Gothenburg. The park was inaugurated Oct. 3, 1908.

The Göteborg Mosque is located at the foot of Ramberget.

== See also ==
- Keillers Park murder
