= Darkside (Necrophobic album) =

Studio album by Necrophobic
- Released: March 4, 1997
- Genre: Blackened death metal
- Length: 37:54
- Label: Black Mark

Necrophobic chronology
Spawned by Evil (1996)	Darkside (1997)	The Third Antichrist (1999)

Darkside is the second studio album by Swedish blackened death metal band Necrophobic. It was released in 1997. There is a hidden track after the tenth track.

== Artwork ==
The album's cover artwork was created by Swedish visual artist and musician Kristian Wahlin. It has been characterized as gothic art that makes use of perspective. The album's booklet artwork also received contributions from Emil Ahlman and Urban Skytt of Nasum. The back cover artwork includes photographs of the band in black and white. According to Kenny Schticky of MetalSucks, the band members "appear to have been awakened far too early in the morning on the day of the photo shoot."

== Reception and legacy ==
Chronicles of Chaos rated the album a score of 8 out of 10. AllMusic gave the album three stars out of five.

Kenny Schticky of MetalSucks included the album on his list of "10 CD Booklets That Should Be Remembered as Fine Art."

== Track listing ==
No.	Title	Lyrics	Music	Length
1.	"Black Moon Rising"	Parland	Parland	2:51
2.	"Spawned by Evil"	Sidegård	Parland, Halfdan	3:21
3.	"Bloodthirst"	Sterner	Parland, Sterner, Halfdan	3:39
4.	"Venaesectio (Episode One)"	(instrumental)	Sidegård	1:23
5.	"Darkside"	Sterner	Parland, Halfdan, Sidegård	3:55
6.	"The Call"	Parland, Sidegård	Parland, Sidegård	3:26
7.	"Descension (Episode Two)"	(instrumental)	Sidegård	1:21
8.	"Nailing the Holy One"	Parland, Sterner, Halfdan, Sidegård	Parland	2:42
9.	"Nifelhel (Episode Three)"	(instrumental)	Halfdan	4:12
10.	"Christian Slaughter"	Sterner, Halfdan	Sterner, Halfdan	6:16
11.	"Nema" (hidden track)			4:48
Total length:				37:54

== Personnel ==
=== Necrophobic ===
- Tobias Sidegård - vocals, bass guitar, guitar solos (1)
- Martin Halfdan - guitars
- Joakim Sterner - drums

=== Additional personnel ===
- Jon Nödtveidt - lead vocals (8)
- Blackmoon - lead and acoustic guitar (1)
- Sebastian Ramstedt - lead guitar (2, 5)
