= Dawn of the Damned =

Studio album by Necrophobic
- Released: 9 October 2020
- Studio: Chrome Studios, Stockholm, Sweden
- Genre: Blackened death metal
- Length: 48:02
- Label: Century Media Records, Napalm Records
- Producer: Fredrik Folkare

Necrophobic chronology
Mark of the Necrogram (2018)	Dawn of the Damned (2020)

Singles from Coherence
- 1. "Devil's Spawn Attack" Released: 2020; 2. "The Infernal Depths of Eternity" Released: 2020; 3. "Mirror Black" Released: 2020

Dawn of the Damned is the ninth studio album by the Swedish blackened death metal band Necrophobic. It was released by the music label Century Media Records on 9 October 2020.

== Background ==
Dawn of the Damned was recorded at Chrome Studios in Stockholm, Sweden. It was produced, mastered and mixed by Fredrik Folkare. It was mixed and mastered by Andreas Vaple. Three music videos were released for the album for the tracks "Devil's Spawn Attack", "The Infernal Depths of Eternity", and "Mirror Black".

== Reception ==
Professional ratings
Review scores
Source	Rating
Blabbermouth	8.5/10
Kerrang!	3/5
Distorted Sound	9/10

The album received mostly positive reviews. Dom Lawson of Blabbermouth praised the album saying "As with all enduring metal subgenres, black metal remains a hugely malleable thing, but Necrophobic keep proving that sticking to the script — and doing it with more intensity than just about anyone else — is still the most exhilarating way to plummet into hell's depths." Fraser Wilson of Distorted Sound stated, "The Swedes once again prove to be masters of their melodic blackened death metal niche, once again waving the flag for the Swedish mindset that brutality can still be catchy." While Nick Ruskell of Kerrang said "True, they’re not saying a whole lot new, but who cares? Being this good at something is good enough."

== Track listing ==
Dawn of the Damned track listing
No.	Title	Lyrics	Music	Length
1.	"Aphelion"		Ramstedt, Folkare	2:25
2.	"Darkness Be My Guide"	Ramstedt	Ramstedt	4:46
3.	"Mirror Black"	Ramstedt	Ramstedt	5:23
4.	"Tartarian Winds"	Ramstedt	Ramstedt	4:24
5.	"The Infernal Depths of Eternity"	Ramstedt	Ramstedt, Strokirk, Bergeback	7:33
6.	"Dawn of the Damned"	Ramstedt, Strokirk	Ramstedt	3:39
7.	"The Shadows"	Ramstedt	Ramstedt	4:55
8.	"As the Fire Burns"	Ramstedt	Ramstedt	4:01
9.	"The Return of a Long Lost Soul"	Strokirk	Ramstedt	7:09
10.	"Devil's Spawn Attack"	Ramstedt	Ramstedt	3:42

== Personnel ==
Necrophobic

- Anders Strokirk – vocals
- Sebastian Ramstedt – lead guitar, rhythm guitar
- Johan Bergebäck – rhythm guitar
- Allan Lundholm – bass
- Joakim Sterner – drums

Production

- Fredrik Folkare – producer, mixing, mastering
- Andreas Vaple – mixing, mastering

== Charts ==
Chart performance for Dawn of the Damned
Chart (2021)	Peak position
German Albums (Offizielle Top 100)	26
Swiss Albums (Schweizer Hitparade)	35
Austrian Albums (Ö3 Austria)	35
Belgian Albums (Ultratop Wallonia)	44
