= The Third Antichrist =

Studio album by Necrophobic
- Released: October 25, 1999
- Genre: Blackened death metal
- Length: 44:20
- Label: Black Mark Production

Necrophobic chronology
Darkside (1997)	The Third Antichrist (1999)	Bloodhymns (2002)

Professional ratings
Review scores
Source	Rating
Allmusic	2/5 stars

The Third Antichrist is the third full-length album by the Swedish blackened death metal band Necrophobic. It was recorded and mixed at Sunlight studios in Stockholm, Sweden December 1998 – June 1999, and released by Black Mark Production in October 1999. Jens Ryden and Michael Semprevivo designed the cover.

== Track listing ==
1. "Rise of the Infernal" 01:45 (Music: Sebastian Ramstedt)
2. "The Third of Arrivals" 04:18 (Music: Tobias Sidegård; Lyrics: Sidegård, Ramstedt)
3. "Frozen Empire" 04:35 (Music: Ramstedt, Joakim Sterner; Lyrics: Sterner)
4. "Into Armageddon" 04:37 (Music: Martin Halfdan; Lyrics: Sterner)
5. "Eye of the Storm" 04:58 (Music: Sidegård, Ramstedt; Lyrics: Sidegård)
6. "The Unhallowed" 02:55 (Music: Halfdan; Lyrics: Sterner)
7. "Isaz" 03:37 (Music: Ramstedt; Lyrics: Halfdan, Sidegård)
8. "The Throne of Souls Possessed" 04:40 (Music: Sterner, Ramstedt; Lyrics: Sterner)
9. "He Who Rideth in Rage" 04:12 (Music: Halfdan, Sidegård, Ramstedt; Lyrics: Halfdan)
10. "Demonic" 05:13 (Music: Ramstedt, Sterner; Lyrics: Ramstedt)
11. "One Last Step Into the Great Mist" 03:30 (Music: Halfdan; Lyrics: Halfdan)

== Members ==
- Tobias Sidegård - vocals, bass guitar
- Sebastian Ramstedt - lead & rhythm guitar
- Martin Halfdan - lead & rhythm guitar
- Joakim Sterner - drums
