= Tony Särkkä =

Swedish musician (1972–2017)

Background information
- Also known as: It
- Born: 15 December 1972; Stockholm, Sweden
- Died: 8 February 2017 (aged 44)
- Genres: Black metal
- Occupation: Musician
- Instruments: Vocals, guitar, drums, bass

Tony Särkkä (15 December 1972 – 8 February 2017), who went by the stage name It, was a Swedish multi-instrumentalist who played in many black metal bands. He played guitar, drums and bass guitar as well as doing vocals. He was joined by Jim Berger in many projects.

Särkkä's projects included Abruptum, Ophthalamia, Vondur, Incision, Brejn Dedd, War and 8th Sin. He also contributed guest vocals to Dissection's second album Storm of the Light's Bane and to Marduk's third album Opus Nocturne. He was the founder of The True Satanist Horde in Sweden.

Särkkä died on 8 February 2017 at the age of 44. His death was officially announced on 14 February by his sister, via Särkkä's Facebook page.
