= Keillers Park murder =

Swedish criminal case

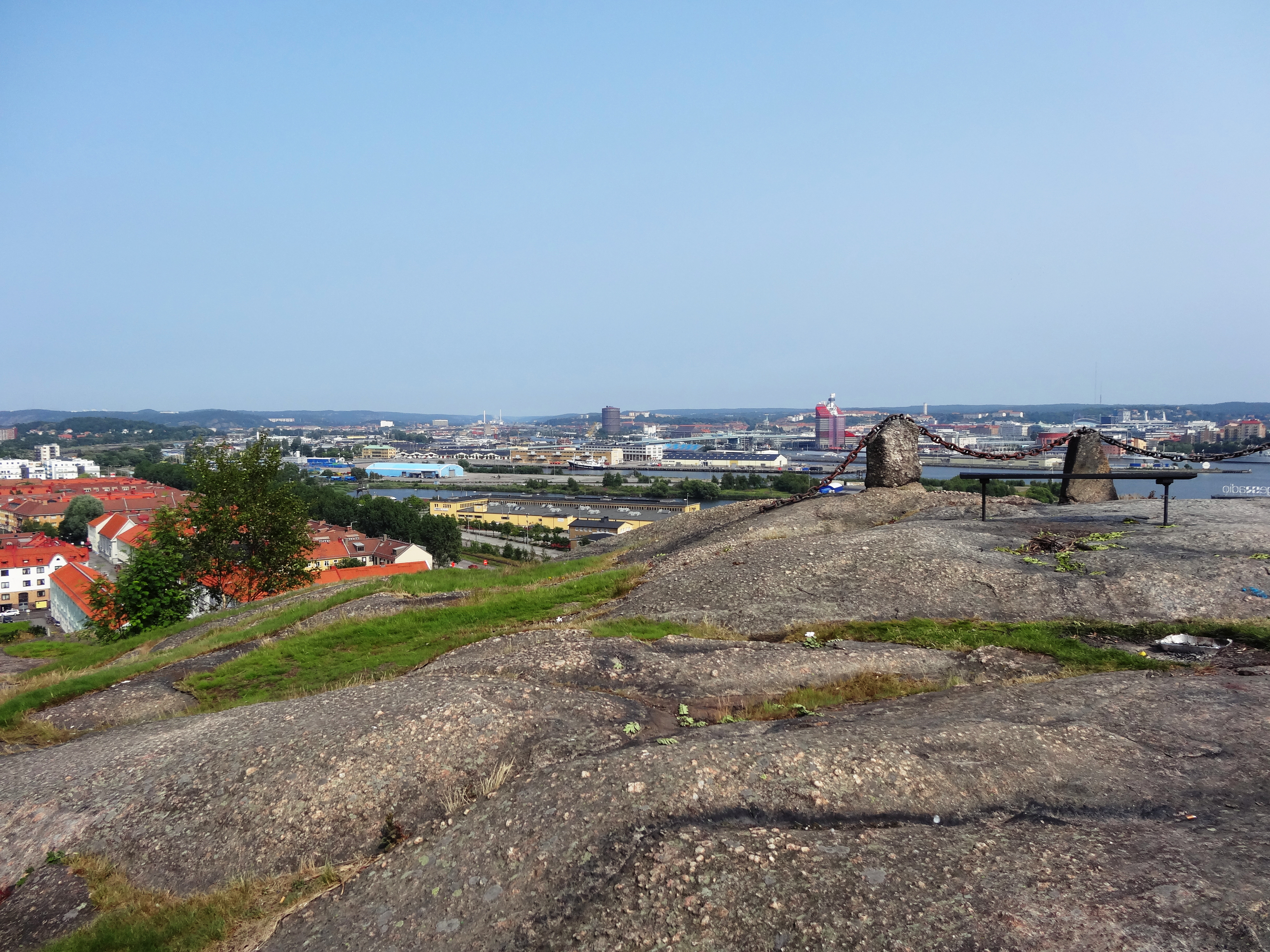
- View over Gothenburg from the heights of Keillers Park

- Keillers Park (Västra Götaland) Keillers Park (Southern Sweden) Keillers Park (Sweden)
- Location: 57°42′52″N 11°56′11″E; Keillers Park, Ramberget, Gothenburg, Sweden
- Date: 23 July 1997 (CET)
- Target: Homosexual man
- Attack type: Shooting
- Weapon: Pistol
- Deaths: 1
- Victim: Josef Ben Meddour
- Perpetrators: Nemesis Khoshnood-Sharis (Note: Now called Victor Draconi.); Jon Nödtveidt
- Motive: Satanism and homophobia
- Verdict: Guilty
- Convictions: Murder (Khoshnood-Sharis); Complicity to murder (Nödtveidt)

The Keillers Park murder was the murder of Josef ben Meddour (Note: Josef is the Swedish spelling of the name Yusef.) (born 1960 or 1961 and aged 36), a gay Algerian man who had been living in Sweden for many years. On 23 July 1997, the body of an unknown man was discovered in a park in the city of Gothenburg, in western Sweden. The man, who had been shot twice with a pistol, was identified two days later as Meddour.

After months of investigation, the police apprehended the two murderers. They were Jon Nödtveidt (born 1975; then aged 22), the frontman of extreme metal band Dissection, and his friend Nemisis Vlad Khosnood (born 1976 or 1977; (Note: Then named Nemesis Khoshnood-Sharis, born Shahin.) then aged 20), a satanist who also used the alias "Frater Nemidial". The two men confessed to their crime and were sentenced by a court of appeal to ten years of incarceration. Vlad was also a suspect in other murder and assault cases and a domestic abuse case at that time.

Nödtveidt and Vlad, who had formed the Satanic cult Misantropiska Lucifer Ordern (MLO), had previously discussed performing human sacrifices before they murdered Meddour. Whether the motive was occult-related could not be clearly established, however. The murder was described as a homophobic hate crime by the Swedish media.

== Discovery of the body ==
On 23 July 1997, at around 4:30 pm, a sixteen-year-old boy discovered the body of a man, lying face down, at the base of an old water tower in Keillers Park, in downtown Gothenburg. Called on site, the police determined that the man had been shot twice with a pistol. The first bullet hit him in the back and went right through the heart, while the second was fired to his head as he lay on the ground. A bag and a head cap were recovered beside the body. (Note: (in Swedish) 04:46 – 05:05 : Plötsligt ser han en man som ligger på mage...) (Note: (in Swedish) Ohlin (2012), p. 2-3.)

No identification was found on the corpse, but a police officer recognized the man from the Svingeln Square area. In the neighbourhood, a shop attendant told the police that the name of the victim was Josef, and that he was often in the company of a man who looked Finnish. (Note: (in Swedish) 07:07 – 08:10 : De vet ännu ingenting om den mördade mannen...) With this testimony, the police identified him as Josef ben Meddour, aged 36, an Algerian national. (Note: (in Swedish) Ohlin (2012), p. 2.) He had been living in Sweden for about ten years. (Note: (in Swedish) 11:17 – 11:29 : Polisen har nu identifierat den man...) Meddour was gay, and the other man was his boyfriend. (Note: (in Swedish) 08:42 – 08:52 : Mannen som butiksbiträdet säger har...)

== First leads ==
The police first suspected the victim's boyfriend. The head cap recovered near the body was his, he had no alibi, and the couple was known for their frequent arguments. After twelve days in custody, the boyfriend was released, and he was later cleared of all suspicion. (Note: (in Swedish) Ohlin (2012), p. 4.)

The investigators then learned that on the evening of 22 July, Meddour had been visited by militants from the GIA, an Algerian Islamic organisation. (Note: (in Swedish) 22:12 – 22:22 : Det visar sig att samma kväll som Josef...) Meddour was known for his opposition to the GIA, so the police considered the possibility of a political assassination. Other people were interrogated, but no suspects emerged. (Note: (in Swedish) Ohlin (2012), p. 5.)

== Arrests ==
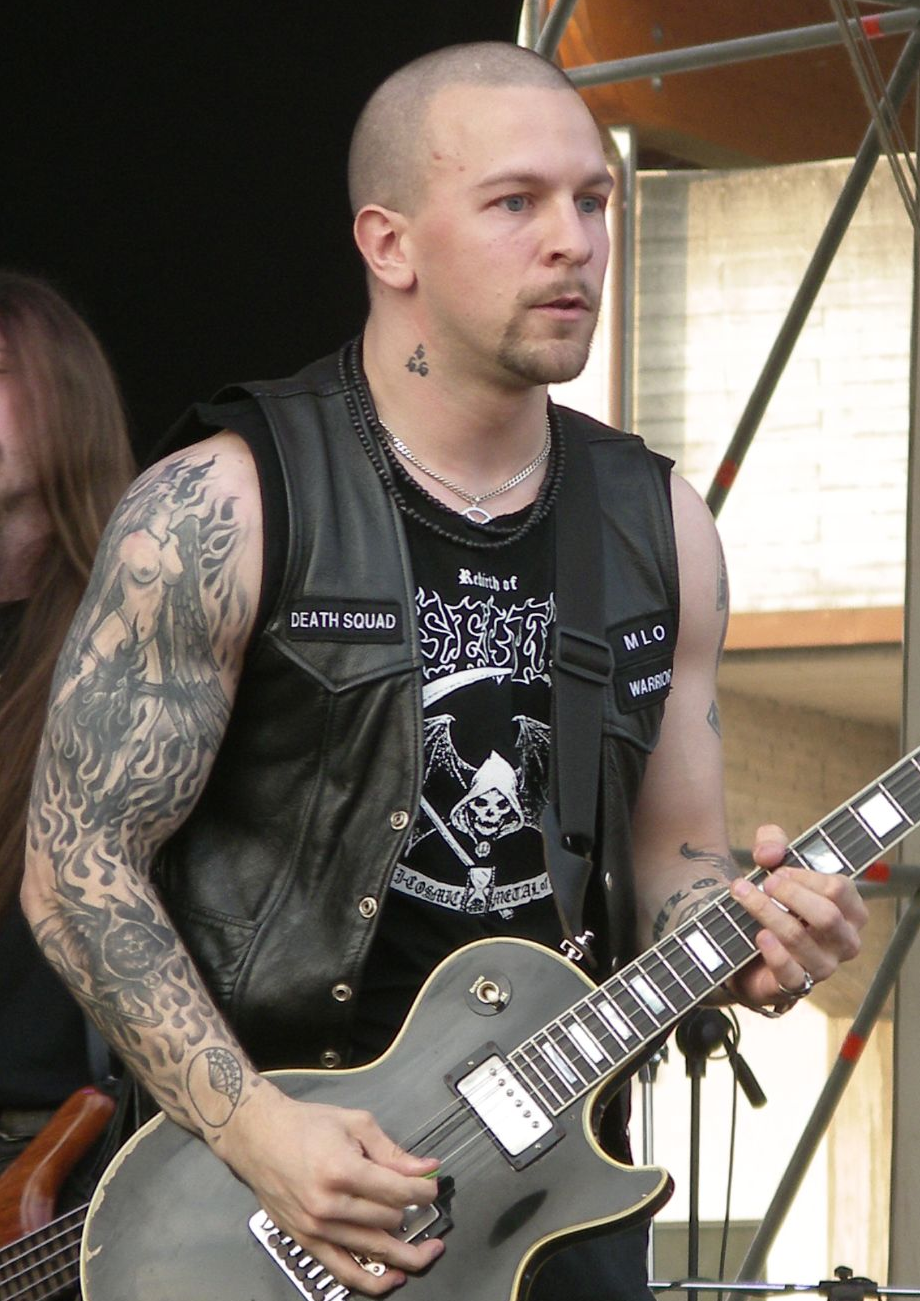
Jon Nödtveidt in 2005

On 15 December 1997, a 23-year-old woman (born 1973 or 1974) entered a police station in Stockholm, the Swedish capital. She wanted to file a complaint against her boyfriend Vlad, whom she accused of beating and repeatedly abusing her, and threatening to kill her and her child. She also told the police that Vlad had once confessed to her that he was, along with his friend Jon, the perpetrator of the Keillers Park murder.

The story that Vlad had told her was as follows: he and Nödtveidt met Meddour in a street of Gothenburg, and invited him to follow them to Keillers Park. There, they first tried to immobilise him with an electroshock weapon (Taser), which somehow did not succeed. Meddour tried to run away, but Vlad shot him in the back with a pistol. While Meddour was lying on the ground, Vlad handed the gun to Nödtveidt, who shot a second bullet into his head.

The 23-year-old woman also told the police that she knew the whereabouts of the murder weapon. (Note: (in Swedish) Ohlin (2012), p. 5-6.) Observations made at the crime scene matched the woman's account of the events. Vlad was arrested the same day at his home in Stockholm. He was found carrying a loaded 9 mm pistol. Nödtveidt was apprehended in Gothenburg on the morning of 18 December. (Note: (in Swedish) Ohlin (2012), p. 6.)

== Confessions ==
The two suspects at first denied any involvement in Meddour's death, but after he was remanded on probable cause, Nödtveidt eventually made a confession, also naming Vlad in the story. On the night of 21 July 1997, he drank at various pubs and clubs in Gothenburg and used amphetamine along with Vlad and two other friends. In the early morning of 22 July, the two other friends headed home, while Nödtveidt and Vlad roamed the city centre. Next to a park locally known as a meeting place for gay men, they were approached by a stranger, who at the sight of their clothes, asked them if they were Satanists, and told them he wanted to learn about this cult. At first, Nödtveidt and Vlad tried to push back the unknown man, Meddour, but he insisted. (Note: (in Swedish) Ohlin (2012), p. 7.)

The two friends eventually invited Meddour to Nödtveidt's home. Meddour's behaviour and speech made clear he was a homosexual, which made Nödtveidt and Vlad angry and offended. Once they reached Nödtveidt's home, Meddour appeared scared and refused to step in. Nödtveidt and Vlad then suggested continuing their discussion about Satanism at Keillers Park. Before they left, Nödtveidt entered his flat to pick up the pistol and the Taser. Once at Keillers Park, Vlad took the Taser from Nödtveidt, and tried unsuccessfully to immobilise Meddour. Meddour attempted to run away, but his escape was cut short when Vlad shot a first bullet in his back, followed by a second bullet in his head. (Note: (in Swedish) Ohlin (2012), p. 7-9.)

When faced with his contradictions, Vlad also confessed to the murder. His version of the events was very similar to Nödtveidt's, apart from one significant difference: according to him, Nödtveidt was the one who had held the gun, and who had pulled the trigger twice. (Note: (in Swedish) Ohlin (2012), p. 9-10.)

== Background ==
=== Black metal ===
Nödtveidt was the leader of the band, Dissection, that had earned some fame in the small world of early black metal, a subgenre of heavy metal characterised by the occultism and raw violence of its lyrics, (Note: (in Swedish) 27:52 – 28:16 : Och samtidigt som den här metalen slog igenom...) and by the extreme behaviour and lifestyle of its followers. (Note: (in Swedish) 01:12 – 01:29 : Black metal är inte bara en musikgenre...) In the mid-nineties, the brief history of black metal was already riddled with violent deaths. (Note: (in Swedish) 31:00 – 31:20 : Det är nu det tar sin början...)

In 1991, Per Ohlin (1969-1991), the Swedish singer of a Norwegian band called Mayhem, committed suicide (aged 22), (Note: (in Swedish) 32:00 – 32:24 : Och i slutet på 80-talet så flyttade...) by shooting himself in the head with a shotgun. (Note: (in Swedish) Ohlin (2012), p. 12.) His body was found by the band's leader, Øystein Aarseth (1968-1993), who instead of calling the police immediately, left to buy a disposable camera, and came back to take photographs of the corpse, which were eventually used for the bootleg live album Dawn of the Black Hearts (whose creator, Mauricio Montoya Botero, died in 2002 by suicide at the age of 38). (Note: (in Swedish) 32:25 – 32:44 : Men när han upptäcktes av Øystein...) Aarseth also picked up fragments of his friend's skull, which ended up on a display shelf at the Helvete record shop in Oslo. (Note: (in Swedish) 34:19 – 34:30 : I ett hörn i Helvete står ett vitrinskåp...)

The following year, Bård "Faust" Eithun (born 1974), a co-worker of Aarseth, stabbed a homosexual man in a park in Lillehammer. (Note: (in Swedish) 36:03 – 36:31 : En av medlemmarna var en kille som...) Aarseth himself was stabbed to death in 1993 (aged 25) by a Norwegian musician, Varg Vikernes (born 1973), who was known for his solo project Burzum. Vikernes claims that the murder was in fact an act of self-defense, as Aarseth had allegedly planned to murder him. Vikernes—who was also accused of burning three churches—was sentenced in 1994 to 21 years in prison. (Note: (in Swedish) 43:27 – 44:52 : Situationen i Norge blev ohållbar ganska...)

=== Satanism ===
When the arrests were made on 15 and 18 December 1997, the police discovered satanic altars in the homes of the two suspects. (Note: (in Swedish) Ohlin (2012), p. 7-8.) A human skull was also found at Vlad's place, for which he was charged with possession of human parts. (Note: (in Swedish) Ohlin (2012), p. 8.) Nödtveidt and Vlad were members of a satanic organization called Misanthropic Luciferian Order (MLO), of which Vlad was one of the founders, and that, according to the police, never had more than a handful of followers. (Note: (in Swedish) Ohlin (2012), p. 13.)

During their investigations, the police interrogated former members of the MLO, who described the organisation and narrated the occult ceremonies they had attended. Rituals included meditation, invocations of demons, and animal sacrifices (specifically cats, which were bought through classified ads). During the weeks that preceded the murder of Josef ben Meddour, Vlad had been more and more extremist in his speech, and the idea of performing human sacrifices, followed by a mass suicide, was discussed at length. During a meeting at Nödtveidt's place, a list of possible victims was made. It included a former follower who had defected, band members from Dissection, and Nödtveidt's girlfriend. (Note: (in Swedish) Ohlin (2012), p. 13-14.)

These plans led to the defection of some members of the MLO, who did not want to take part in any assassination, or who feared for their own lives. As a result, when the arrests were made, the number of active members was down to three: Nödtveidt, Vlad, and his girlfriend. (Note: (in Swedish) Ohlin (2012), p. 14.)

== Trials ==
During the trial, the motives of the murder were not made clear. Whether it was a satanic crime, one of the human sacrifices that the MLO members had talked about, or a hate crime. According to criminal inspector Lars Ohlin, who led the police investigation, Nödtveidt stated during interrogation that the murder was a "sacrifice to Satan", but later retracted the statement. According to Ohlin, Nödtveidt and Vlad's acts were in the tradition of Satanism, but homophobia was a major factor, and the Keillers Park murder was registered as a hate crime by the Swedish police. (Note: (in Swedish) 71:20 – 71:32 : Rätten lägger stor vikt på att det finns...)

On 6 July 1998, Nödtveidt was sentenced by the Gothenburg District Court to eight years in prison for accessory to murder and illegal possession of a firearm. Vlad was sentenced to ten years for murder, violence against his girlfriend, illegal possession of a firearm and possession of body parts. All three parties appealed the verdict.

The Court of Appeal for Western Sweden gave its verdict on 25 September 1998. Nödtveidt was this time sentenced to ten years in prison, the same as Vlad, whose sentence was confirmed.

== Aftermath ==
Nödtveidt and Vlad were released in 2004, after spending seven years in prison. (Note: (in Swedish) 72:06 – 72:09 : De släpps både två...) Nödtveidt committed suicide in 2006. His body was found at his home, surrounded by a ring of candles, a ritual book by his side.

Josef ben Meddour's body was repatriated to Algeria. He was buried in the national capital, Algiers. (Note: (in Swedish) 76:17 – 76:33 : Eftersom Per Anders och Josef inte hade...)

== In books and films ==
- Hilton, Johan (2006). No tears for queers: ett reportage om män, bögar och hatbrott [No tears for queers: a story about men, gays and hate crimes] (in Swedish) (New ed.). Stockholm: Atlas. ISBN 91-7389-223-8. SELIBR 10154503.
- (in Swedish) Keillers Park (2006), film directed by Susanna Edwards and written by Pia Gradvall.

== Sources ==
P3 dokumentär om mordet i Keillers Park

On 24 March 2013, the Swedish radio station P3 broadcast a documentary produced by Ida Lundqvist on the Keillers Park murder.

Satanistmordet i Keillers Park

An article written by criminal inspector Lars Ohlin, who led the investigation, originally published in the book Nordisk kriminalkrönika 1999. It was reproduced in issue #31/2012 of the magazine Veckans brott.
