= Maha Kali =

Single by Dissection
- Released: 10 November 2004
- Recorded: 2003–2004
- Studio: Hall Prison (2003); Monolith Studio (2004)
- Genre: Melodic death metal
- Length: 12:07
- Label: Escapi Music
- Producer(s): Lech Chudon; Tomas Asklund

"Maha Kali" is a single by the Swedish extreme metal band Dissection, released in 2004. It was the first release after the rebirth of Dissection, shortly after Jon Nödtveidt was released from prison. It represents the band's change from a "blackened" sound to primarily melodic death metal. "Maha Kali" entered the Swedish single charts at number 50. The B-side on the single, "Unhallowed (Rebirth Version)", is a re-recording from Storm of the Light's Bane.

== Release history ==
"Maha Kali" was re-recorded and included on Dissection's last full-length album, Reinkaos. The song also appears on the live DVD Rebirth of Dissection (2006) and the live album Live Rebirth (2010).

== Critical reception ==
Metal.de said the song doesn't have any rough edges and doesn't sound like Dissection anymore. The basic riff was noted as similar to "Hell Is Where the Heart Is" by Edge of Sanity. Powermetal.de said the band is out of any new ideas and the song's atmosphere is very different to previous Dissection records.

Decibel said that the song was disappointing in its 2004 release but liked the re-recorded version on Reinkaos. It was remarked that it closes the album perfectly.

Per Ardua Ad Astra of Sputnikmusic gave 2.5/5 rating said that Dissection's "Maha Kali" has good melodies but lacks the aggression, atmosphere, and originality of their earlier work, resulting in a disappointing release despite competent playing.

== Track listing ==
1. "Maha Kali" – 6:01
2. "Unhallowed (Rebirth Version)" – 6:06

== Personnel ==
- Jon Nödtveidt − vocals, guitars
- Set Teitan − guitars, backing vocals
- Tomas Asklund − drums
- Brice Leclercq − bass

== Charts ==
Chart performance for "Maha Kali"
Chart (2004)	Peak position
Sweden (Sverigetopplistan)	50
