= Jon Nödtveidt =

Swedish musician (1975–2006)

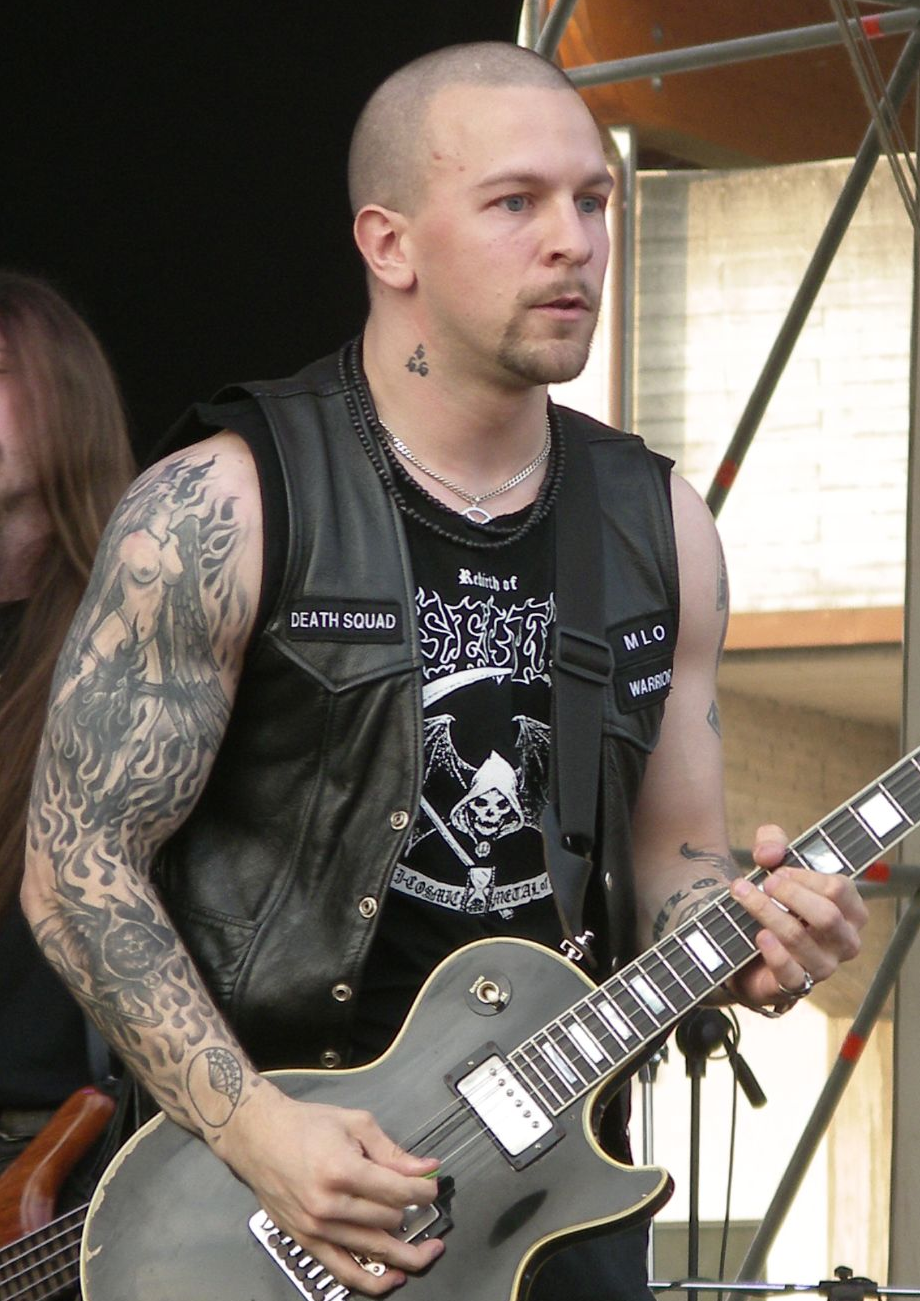
- Nödtveidt in 2005

Background information
- Also known as: Shadow; Rietas; Witchhammer
- Born: Jon Andreas Nödtveidt; 28 June 1975; Katrineholm, Sweden
- Died: 13 August 2006 (aged 31) Hässelby, Sweden
- Genres: Black metal; melodic death metal
- Occupation: Musician
- Instruments: Vocals; guitar
- Years active: 1988–1997; 2004–2006
- Formerly of: Dissection; Ophthalamia; The Black; De Infernali

Jon Andreas Nödtveidt (28 June 1975 – 13 August 2006) was a Swedish musician best known as the founder, vocalist and lead guitarist of the extreme metal band Dissection. With the band, he released the seminal and influential extreme metal albums The Somberlain (1993) and Storm of the Light's Bane (1995). In addition to Dissection, Nödtveidt performed with several other projects, including Ophthalamia, The Black, De Infernali and Nifelheim, and also worked as a journalist for Metal Zone, where he covered the growing black metal scene.

In 1998, Nödtveidt was sentenced to ten years in prison for accessory to murder. Upon his release from prison in 2004, he resumed his work with Dissection and released the album Reinkaos (2006). He committed suicide on 13 August 2006 at the age of 31.

== Career ==
Nödtveidt was born to a Norwegian father and a Swedish mother. He started to play guitar around eight years old. He cited Running Wild, Judas Priest, Manowar, Black Sabbath, Venom, Bathory, Possessed, and Morbid Angel among his favourite heavy metal bands, as well as electronic and progressive rock artists like Klaus Schulze, Tangerine Dream, and Landberk. At the beginning of his musical career, he was a member of the hard rock band Thunder with his younger brother Emil, and later thrash/death metal bands Siren's Yell and Rabbit's Carrot. In 1989, he formed Dissection together with bassist Peter Palmdahl. Following the release of the demo The Grief Prophecy and the EP Into Infinite Obscurity in 1991, the band released their debut album, The Somberlain, in 1993.

In 1992, he joined the Swedish black metal band Ophthalamia where he provided vocals under the stage name "Shadow" on their 1994, album A Journey in Darkness. In 1994, Nödtveidt joined Nifelheim as a session guitarist, he played on their first two albums Nifelheim (1995) and Devil's Force (1998). Later legal matters stopped him from appearing on their third studio album released in 2000. He also played on the 1994 album The Priest of Satan with black metal band The Black.

During the summer of 1995, he joined the newly formed Satanic organization Misanthropic Luciferian Order (MLO) which promoted anti-cosmic Satanism. Later that year, Dissection released their second studio album, Storm of the Light's Bane. In 1996, Nödtveidt formed the dark ambient band De Infernali and released the album Symphonia De Infernal the following year.

=== Imprisonment and later career ===
In July 1998, Nödtveidt was convicted of being an accessory to the 1997 murder of Josef ben Meddour. He restarted Dissection upon his release from prison in 2004 and embarked on the Rebirth of Dissection tour. In 2006, the band released their third studio album, Reinkaos. In May of that year, Nödtveidt announced that the band would split up following a short tour in support of their new album. Dissection played their final show on 24 June 2006 in Stockholm on Midsummer.

== Death ==
On 13 August 2006, Nödtveidt was found dead in his apartment in Hässelby by an apparent self-inflicted gunshot wound inside a circle of lit candles.

Early reports indicated that he was found with an open copy of the Satanic Bible, but these were later dismissed by Dissection's guitarist Set Teitan. According to him, "it's not any atheist, humanist and ego-worshipping The Satanic Bible by Anton LaVey that Jon had in front of him, but a Satanic grimoire. He despised LaVey and the 'Church of Satan'." The said "Satanic grimoire" is reputed to be the Liber Azerate, one of the publishings of the Misanthropic Luciferian Order, of which Nödtveidt was a member since the early stages of the cult. The lyrics of the final Dissection album, Reinkaos, were co-written by Nödtveidt's friend Vlad (Victor Draconi) (Note: Previously named Nemesis Khoshnood-Sharis, born Shahin.) who wrote the Liber Azerate under the pseudonym Frater Nemidial and was convicted of murder in 1998.

Nödtveidt's brother, Emil "Nightmare Industries" Nödtveidt, the rhythm guitarist and keyboardist of the band Deathstars, wrote a song named "Via the End" the night he heard about Nödtveidt's suicide. The song appeared on Deathstars' 2009 album Night Electric Night.

Regarding his views on suicide, Nödtveidt said:

The Satanist decides of his own life and death and prefers to go out with a smile on his lips when he has reached his peak in life, when he has accomplished everything, and aim to transcend this earthly existence. But it is completely un-satanic to end one's own life because one is sad or miserable. The Satanist dies strong, not by age, disease or depression, and he chooses death before dishonor! Death is the orgasm of life! So live life accordingly, as intense as possible!

== Discography ==
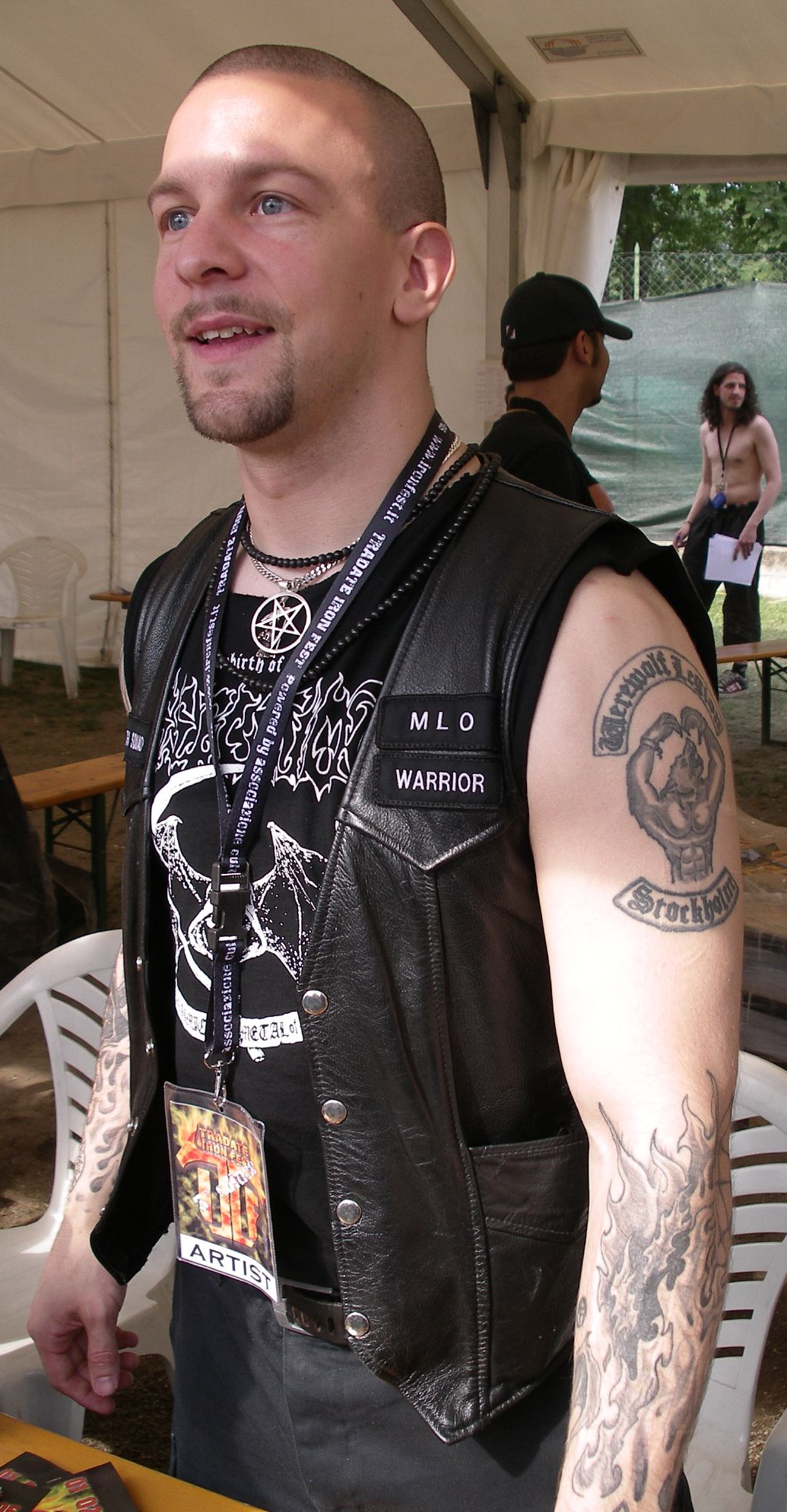
Nödtveidt in 2005

=== With Dissection ===
Studio albums

- The Somberlain (1993)
- Storm of the Light's Bane (1995)
- Reinkaos (2006)

Compilation albums

- The Past Is Alive (The Early Mischief) (1997)
- I Am the Great Shadow (2021)

Live albums

- Live Legacy (2003)
- Live in Stockholm 2004 (2009)
- Live Rebirth (2010)

EPs

- Into Infinite Obscurity (1991)
- Where Dead Angels Lie (1996)
- Maha Kali (2004)

Video albums

- Rebirth of Dissection (2006)

=== With Thunder ===
- Thunder (1987)

=== With The Black ===
- The Priest of Satan (1994)

=== With Ophthalamia ===
- A Journey in Darkness (1994)

=== With De Infernali ===
- Symphonia De Infernali (1997)

=== With Nifelheim ===
- Nifelheim (1995)
- Devil's Force (1998)

=== Other appearances ===
- Necrophobic – Darkside (1997) (vocals on "Nailing the Holy One")
- Diabolicum – The Dark Blood Rising (The Hatecrowned Retaliation) (2001) (lyrics for "Sound the Horns of Reprisal")
