= Storm of the Light's Bane =

Studio album by Dissection
- Released: 17 November 1995
- Recorded: 17–30 March 1995
- Studio: Hellspawn/Unisound
- Genres: Melodic black metal; melodic death metal
- Length: 43:16
- Label: Nuclear Blast
- Producer: Dissection

Dissection chronology
The Somberlain (1993)	Storm of the Light's Bane (1995)	Reinkaos (2006)

Storm of the Light's Bane is the second studio album by Swedish black metal band Dissection, released on 17 November 1995 by Nuclear Blast Records. It is the first album with guitarist Johan Norman, who replaced John Zwetsloot.

This would be the band's last full-length album before frontman Jon Nödtveidt's 1997 incarceration for the felony murder of Josef ben Meddour. It would not be until 2006 that they would release their third and final album Reinkaos, which was followed by the breakup of the band and Nödtveidt's suicide shortly after. As with the band's debut album, Kristian "Necrolord" Wåhlin created the artwork.

Several publications have called the album a "masterpiece" and "one of the best black metal albums ever written".

== Music and lyrics ==
The album is notable for being one of the earliest and most successful examples of a band combining black metal with the melodic death metal sound that was developing in Gothenburg around the time of this album's release. Metal Hammer said "While Sweden's Dissection were very much black metal in terms of ideology and atmosphere, they also featured noticeable elements of the melodic death metal movement exploding in their home country, as well as classic '80s heavy metal." Dave Schalek wrote that "the songs are cold, dark, evil and extreme." OC Weekly have described the album as "extreme and aggressive but also primeval and classically orchestrated with heavy echoes of drums and haunting melodies hidden throughout the darkness."

In an interview, Jon Nödtveidt said that though "everything we do is connected through death in one way or another. This is not an album where all the songs follow a story. On this record, all the songs and music are different but still have that death theme within them to tie them in some form or another." He also added that "We never limit ourselves even if we feel we play dark, death metal. We don't write our music to fit into a certain pattern."

== Release history ==
In 1995, Nuclear Blast released a Europe-exclusive special digipak version of the album limited to 500 copies, which upon unfolding formed the shape of a cross with the song's lyrics printed on the sleeves. It was re-released in 2002 as a digipak (catalogue number: NB 646-2), this time with the 1997 EP Where Dead Angels Lie as bonus tracks. The Japanese edition features the bonus track "Feathers Fell" as track 5, in between "Where Dead Angels Lie" and "Retribution – Storm of the Light's Bane". The album was re-released once again in 2006 by The End Records in a two-disc set, and includes the Where Dead Angels Lie EP, an unreleased EP from 1994 featuring two songs from the album, and an "alternate mix" version of the full album, all remastered from the original master tapes by Håkan Åkesson at Cutting Room Studios in Stockholm, and packaged in a slipcase. This version is touted as the "Ultimate Reissue".

== Reception and legacy ==
=== Critical reception ===
Professional ratings
Review scores
Source	Rating
AllMusic	4.5/5 stars
Chronicles of Chaos	6/10
Collector's Guide to Heavy Metal	9/10
Metal.de	10/10
Rock Hard	8.5/10

The album is routinely cited as a landmark album in the history of black metal, and as one of the earliest examples of a band blending black metal and death metal, more particularly, melodic death metal.

In his review of the album for AllMusic, William York described all of the album's songs as "expertly crafted mini-epics" with thematic unity and memorable melodies, adding that the album is "deservedly hailed as a landmark" of the genre.

Sputnikmusic mentions the attention to detail in the music and the "meticulous structure" of each song, naming the album the legacy of the band.

Metal Hammer named it one of the 20 best black metal albums of the 90s, noting the influence of melodic death metal, and describing it as "a melodic, majestic and gloriously epic listen that features a measured, bombastic tone yet also makes use of furious, high-paced delivery when necessary."

Loudwire describe it as a "milestone in extreme metal" and "one to chill the bones and the only one of its kind."

In 2023, Andy O'Connor of Spin wrote: "It’s nothing short of breathtaking: Melodies are deliberately labored for optimal resonance, yet they feel as natural as wind and sunlight. [...] It’s totally possible to recognize someone who did what [Nödtveidt] did was also capable of making highly affecting music, though it doesn’t make it easier to stomach. Every artist’s dream is to live forever through their work, right? Nödtveidt got what he wanted: His melodies will always be bigger than him. Even if we can’t fully untangle Dissection from its creator, it’s not impossible to liberate those melodies in some way. They’re too good to be shamefully chained."

=== Accolades ===
Publication	Accolade	Position
Metal Hammer	20 Best Black Metal Albums of the Nineties	–
IGN	10 Great Black Metal Albums	–
LA Weekly	10 Metal Albums to Hear Before You Die	2
Loudwire	10 Best Metal Albums of 1995	3
About.com	Best Metal Albums of 1995	4
Terrorizer	Most Important Albums of the Nineties	–
Terrorizer	Top 40 Black Metal Albums	8
Decibel	Top 100 Black Metal Albums of All Time	23

== Track listing ==
Track listing adapted from liner notes.

No.	Title	Lyrics	Music	Length
1.	"At the Fathomless Depths" (instrumental)		Nödtveidt	1:56
2.	"Night's Blood"	Nödtveidt	Nödtveidt/Zwetsloot	6:41
3.	"Unhallowed"	Nödtveidt/Tony Särkkä	Nödtveidt/Norman	7:28
4.	"Where Dead Angels Lie"	Nödtveidt	Nödtveidt	5:53
5.	"Retribution – Storm of the Light's Bane"	Nödtveidt	Nödtveidt/Zwetsloot	4:51
6.	"Thorns of Crimson Death"	Nödtveidt	Nödtveidt/Norman	8:06
7.	"Soulreaper"	Nödtveidt	Nödtveidt/Norman	6:56
8.	"No Dreams Breed in Breathless Sleep" (instrumental)		Alexandra Balogh	1:26
Total length:				43:16

Bonus disc (2006 reissue)
No.	Title	Lyrics	Music	Length
1.	"At the Fathomless Depths" (Unreleased alternative mix '95)		Nödtveidt	1:56
2.	"Night's Blood" (Unreleased alternative mix '95)	Nödtveidt	Nödtveidt/Zwetsloot	6:41
3.	"Unhallowed" (Unreleased alternative mix '95)	Nödtveidt/Tony Särkkä	Nödtveidt/Norman	7:28
4.	"Where Dead Angels Lie" (Unreleased alternative mix '95)	Nödtveidt	Nödtveidt	5:53
5.	"Retribution – Storm of the Light's Bane" (Unreleased alternative mix '95)	Nödtveidt	Nödtveidt/Zwetsloot	4:51
6.	"Feathers Fell" (Unreleased alternative mix '95)			0:54
7.	"Thorns of Crimson Death" (Unreleased alternative mix '95)	Nödtveidt	Nödtveidt/Norman	8:06
8.	"Soulreaper" (Unreleased alternative mix '95)	Nödtveidt	Nödtveidt/Norman	6:56
9.	"No Dreams Breed in Breathless Sleep" (Unreleased alternative mix '95)		Alexandra Balogh	1:26
10.	"Night's Blood" (Unreleased demo 1994)			7:14
11.	"Retribution – Storm of the Light's Bane" (Unreleased demo 1994)			5:12
12.	"Elisabeth Bathori" (Tormentor cover, Where Dead Angels Lie '96 remastered original mix)			5:05
13.	"Where Dead Angels Lie" (Demo version, Where Dead Angels Lie '96 remastered original mix)			6:10
14.	"Anti Christ" (Slayer cover, Where Dead Angels Lie '96 remastered original mix)			2:44
15.	"Son of the Mourning" (Where Dead Angels Lie '96 remastered original mix)			3:13

== Personnel ==
Dissection

- Jon Nödtveidt – vocals, lead, rhythm & acoustic guitars
- Johan Norman – rhythm guitar
- Peter Palmdahl – bass guitar
- Ole Öhman – drums

Additional musicians

- Alexandra Balogh – piano
- Legion – backing vocals on "Thorns of Crimson Death"
- Tony Särkkä – backing vocals on "Soulreaper"

Production

- Dissection – arrangement and production
- Dan Swanö – recording, engineering and mixing
- Håkan Åkesson – mastering and remastering (2006)
- Necrolord – cover artwork
- Oscar Matsson – photography
