= Dissection (band) =

Swedish extreme metal band

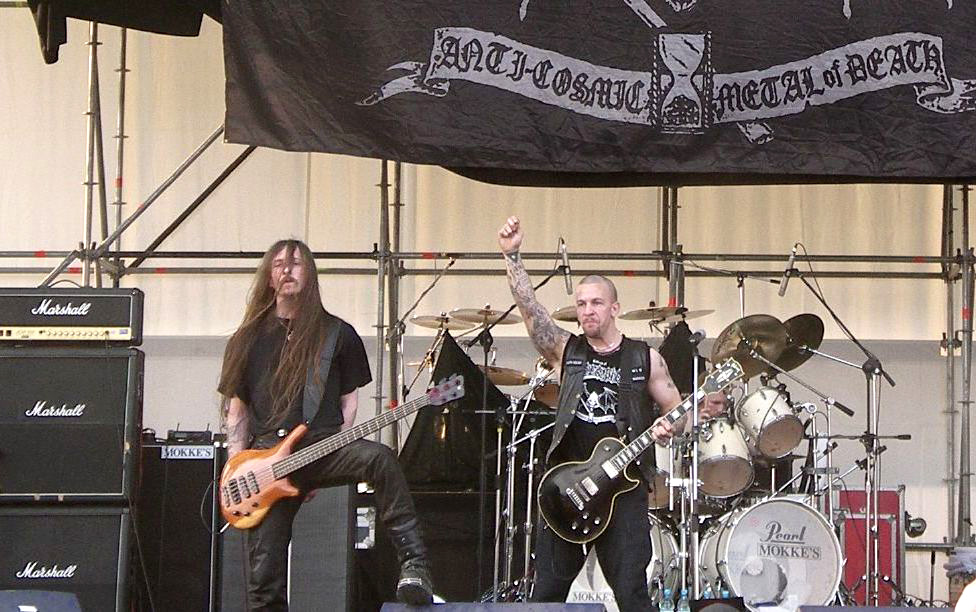
- Dissection performing in 2005. Left to right: Brice Leclerq and Jon Nödtveidt

Background information
- Origin: Strömstad, Sweden
- Genres: Melodic black metal; melodic death metal
- Years active: 1989–1997; 2004–2006
- Labels: No Fashion; Nuclear Blast; The End
- Past members: Jon Nödtveidt; Set Teitan; Tomas Asklund; Mattias "Mäbe" Johansson; John Zwetsloot; Johan Norman; Peter Palmdahl; Emil Nödtveidt; Brice Leclerq; Haakon Forwald; Erik Danielsson; Ole Öhman; Tobias Kellgren
- Website: www.dissection.se

Dissection was a Swedish extreme metal band from Strömstad, formed in 1989 by guitarist, vocalist, and main songwriter Jon Nödtveidt and bassist Peter Palmdahl. Despite several lineup changes, Dissection released The Somberlain in 1993 and Storm of the Light's Bane in 1995 before splitting up in 1997 due to Nödtveidt's imprisonment for complicity in the murder of Josef Meddour.

After his release, Nödtveidt reformed the band in 2004 with new members whom he felt could "stand behind and live up to the demands of Dissection's Satanic concept." They released their third and final full-length album, Reinkaos, in April 2006 before disbanding that June. Nödtveidt said he had "reached the limitations of music as a tool for expressing what I want to express, for myself and the handful of others that I care about." Two months later, Nödtveidt committed suicide with a gun inside a circle of lit candles in his apartment in Hässelby.

Dissection released several live albums and EPs before its final dissolution and played a central role in the development of Sweden's black metal and death metal scenes, particularly through the influence of the first two albums; it has sometimes been described as part of the Gothenburg scene.

== History ==
=== First era ===
In 1988, a thrash metal band named Siren's Yell was formed in the Swedish town of Strömstad. Its members were Jon Nödtveidt, Ole Öhman, Peter Palmdahl, and Mattias "Mäbe" Johansson. The group recorded a single demo before breaking up in 1989. Nödtveidt joined the band Rabbit's Carrot, where Öhman played drums. Nödtveidt and Öhman "were never very comfortable in Rabbit's Carrot, which also explains their short time in that band, as they wanted the music and lyrics to evolve on the extreme dark side. Jon would write songs and arrange them together with Ole in the rehearsal place, but the other members didn't feel that the material would fit the band." In autumn 1989, Jon Nödtveidt formed Dissection together with Palmdahl on bass. In the spring of 1990, they recruited drummer Öhman. In April 1990, the first official rehearsal tape, Severed into Shreds, was recorded and sent to underground fanzines worldwide "to mark the birth of Dissection, a band that was about to make heavy impact on the scene". The band recruited former Siren's Yell bassist Mattias "Mäbe" Johansson, who was now playing with the local death/thrash metal band Nosferatu, as a live session member playing rhythm guitar. Dissection's first concert was held in October 1990 with death metal act Entombed.

In December 1990, the band recorded and released the demo The Grief Prophecy. It contained three songs and featured illustrations by the artist known as Necrolord, who later created most Dissection album artworks.

In January 1991, second guitarist John Zwetsloot joined the band, which now had a complete line-up "and could further develop their characteristic dual-harmony guitar sound that was to become an important part of the band's sound". The first concert with Zwetsloot was held in February 1991 at a local death metal event in the band's hometown Strömstad. As the demo was spreading in the underground scene, the French record label Corpsegrinder Records offered Dissection a deal to record an EP.

In April 1991, Dead, the notorious Norwegian black metal group Mayhem's vocalist, committed suicide. A few days later, Dissection played the Mayhem song "Freezing Moon" in honour of Dead at a show in Falkenberg, Sweden, and made an unofficial special edition of The Grief Prophecy demo with a cover drawn by Dead. In September 1991, the band recorded three new tracks for the 7-inch EP Into Infinite Obscurity, released in December 1991 by Corpsegrinder Records in a limited edition of 1,000 copies. In December 1991, Nödtveidt and Öhman also played live in Askim, Norway, at a black metal concert arranged by the Norwegian Black Circle Nödtveidt had joined, with Euronymous, who led the Circle and the band Mayhem. Nödtveidt, Öhman, and Euronymous performed "Freezing Moon" live.

In 1992, Dissection recorded a four-track promo tape and signed a one-album deal with No Fashion Records. In March 1993, the band recorded the full-length album The Somberlain, recorded and mixed at Hellspawn/Unisound studios with Dan Swanö. During that time, the band's members, who were temporarily living in different towns, all moved to Gothenburg after the summer of 1993, where they shared a steady rehearsal place with At the Gates. The album was released in December 1993 and dedicated to Euronymous, who had been murdered earlier the same year.

As the band members found themselves rehearsing more and more without Zwetsloot and had to cancel shows because he did not show up for the preparing rehearsals, the band were forced to dismiss the guitarist. The last concert with Zwetsloot was performed in Oslo, Norway, on 14 April 1994. The day Zwetsloot was fired, Dissection contacted Johan Norman from Satanized (a short-lived project Nödtveidt was involved with), who showed up a day later and was deemed a worthy and motivated successor by the band. Dissection continued playing live, wrote songs for a second album, and entered the studio twice to record demos of new songs and the contribution "Anti-Christ" for the Slayer tribute compilation album Slatanic Slaughter on Black Sun Records. In November 1994, Dissection signed a deal with Nuclear Blast and focused on the second album. In March 1995, the band returned to the Hellspawn/Unisound studios to record their second full-length, followed by a three-date tour through the UK with Cradle of Filth and a few concerts in Sweden.

During the summer of 1995, Nödtveidt and Norman joined the newly formed Satanic organisation Misanthropic Luciferian Order (MLO, now known as Temple of the Black Light). In September 1995, drummer Ole Öhman left Dissection and was replaced by Tobias Kellgren (ex-Satanized). He was introduced to the Swedish fans at a show with Morbid Angel at Kåren in Gothenburg, 10 October 1995.

In November 1995, Dissection's second studio album, Storm of the Light's Bane, was released by Nuclear Blast, followed by a two-week European tour through Germany, Austria, Czech Republic, Switzerland, and Sweden in December 1995, and the World Tour of the Light's Bane covering Europe and America, ending in 1997.

By the beginning of January 1996, Dissection was playing shows in Sweden before leaving for a UK tour with At the Gates in February, followed by a vast US tour with At the Gates and Morbid Angel in March. Back in Scandinavia, Dissection played at the Rockefeller in Oslo together with Darkthrone and Satyricon, marking the start of a co-headlining European tour. In April, in connection with the co-headlining European tour, Dissection released the Where Dead Angels Lie MCD, which contained the title track's studio and demo versions as well as other demo recordings and two cover songs.

In 1997, Dissection played the Gods of Darkness tour together with Cradle of Filth, In Flames and Dimmu Borgir. Dissection's and Dimmu Borgir's show at the Live Music Hall in Cologne, Germany, on 31 March 1997, was recorded and released by Nuclear Blast on the live split video cassette Live & Plugged Vol. II. Dissection's World Tour of the Light's Bane ended with an appearance at the Wacken Open Air festival, which was recorded and released on the Live Legacy album, and the Nuclear Blast festivals.

Although "[t]he first era of Dissection was now at its peak" and "the situation, at least on the surface, seemed to be stable and prosperous with the band's success peaking, personal differences prevailed". This resulted in Palmdahl leaving the band and being replaced by Jon Nödtveidt's brother Emil for the summer festivals. After the summer Norman "suddenly 'disappeared' for several months without notice, with Tobias covering up for him claiming to know nothing (however remaining in close contact with Johan throughout this period). The background of this 'disappearance' being that Johan had turned his back on and betrayed the MLO, fearing their retribution." As Nödtveidt was a member of MLO, Norman had also left Dissection behind, Nödtveidt being the only member left in the band. He recruited a new line-up and booked Studio Fredman for the planned recording of their third studio album.

==== Nödtveidt's murder conviction ====
On 18 December 1997, Nödtveidt and fellow MLO member Vlad (Victor Draconi, also known as Frater Nemidial, then known as Shahin Nemesis Khoshnood-Sharis) were arrested for the murder of a 37-year-old homosexual man, Josef ben Meddour, on 22 July 1997. Nödtveidt received a 10-year sentence, and Necropolis Records released the compilation album The Past Is Alive (The Early Mischief). Vlad/Draconi has been the owner of the Dissection trademark, registered with the Swedish Intellectual Property Office, since 2005.

=== Reformation ===
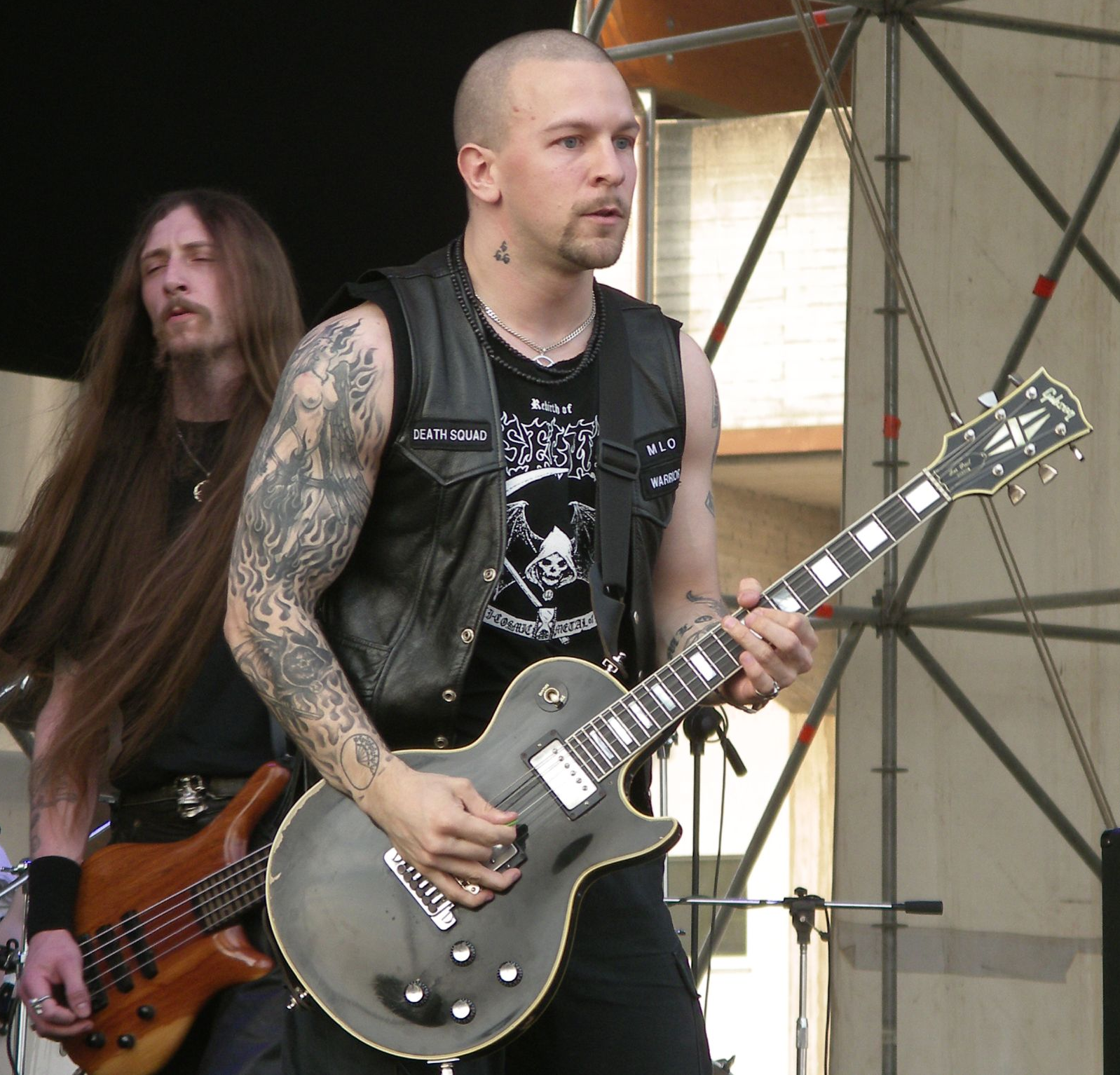
Dissection live in 2005

Upon his release in 2004, Nödtveidt restarted the band with a completely new line-up, including only members able to "stand behind and live up to the demands of Dissection's Satanic concept". Dissection recorded a two-track EP entitled Maha Kali and toured extensively on the Rebirth of Dissection tour.

In 2006, Dissection released their third full-length album, Reinkaos, through their own label in association with The End Records. The band followed the teachings of the MLO, and the lyrics on the Reinkaos album contain magical formulae from the Liber Azerate, based on the organisation's teachings.

=== Breakup ===
In May 2006, shortly after the release of Reinkaos, the band announced plans to split following a short tour. The tour was scheduled to include two appearances in the United States, but these were eventually cancelled after Nödtveidt was denied an entry visa to the country due to his previous incarceration. The band played its final European concert in Stockholm on Midsummer, 24 June 2006. Some former members of Dissection have gone on to form other bands, also influenced by their beliefs based on the MLO.

=== Nödtveidt's suicide ===
On 13 August 2006, frontman Jon Nödtveidt committed suicide. According to the Swedish Expressen, the police said that Nödtveidt was found with a Satanic Bible in front of him, which Blabbermouth.net falsely reported to be a copy of The Satanic Bible. It was later confirmed by band member Set Teitan to be a Satanic grimoire, which is believed to be a copy of the Liber Azerate written by Frater Nemidial, leader of the MLO. With Nödtveidt's death, any possibility of a reunion was lost, as he had remained the only original member since Dissection's foundation; in fact, second founding member Peter Palmdahl had left the band in 1997, when Nödtveidt was arrested.

== Musical style ==
Deathmetal.org notes how the band mixed the extreme styles of death metal and black metal with "the 1970s style of melodic rock that Iron Maiden popularized and developed", and according to Daniel Ekeroth, the band "developed their own melancholic and atmospheric death metal style", which "combine[d] strong melodies with musical brutality".

Dissection considered the "characteristic dual-harmony guitar-sound" to be "an important part of the band's sound" and therefore required a second guitarist. Due to the band's turn towards melodic death metal, Tomas "Tompa" Lindberg regards Dissection as part of the Gothenburg scene.

== Involvement in MLO ==
The lead vocalist of Dissection, Jon Nödtveidt, was a member of the Misanthropic Luciferian Order, founded in 1995. Nödtveidt was introduced to the organisation by close friends at an early stage.

When the police investigated the MLO after the murder of Josef ben Meddour, they interrogated former members who described the organisation and recounted the occult ceremonies they had attended. Rituals included meditation, invocations of demons, and animal sacrifices—cats, which were bought through classified ads. In the weeks preceding the murder of Josef ben Meddour, Vlad had become increasingly extremist in his speech, and the idea of performing human sacrifices, followed by a mass suicide, was discussed at length. During a meeting at Nödtveidt's place, a list of possible victims was made. It included a former follower who had defected, band members from Dissection, and even Nödtveidt's girlfriend.

Nödtveidt said of the MLO in an interview: "MLO is a Chaos-Gnostic order, which seeks the true light of Lucifer through the study, development, and practice of all dark, gnostic and Satanic magical systems. Our goal is to create a synthesis between the dark traditions of all aeons, thus creating the occult keys that shall open the gates to the forthcoming endless dark aeon. My status within the order is that of a full member of the second grade and a Priest of Satan. To become a candidate, one must first of all already be an Anti-cosmic Satanist and actively practicing black magician. He/she must wholeheartedly sympathise with and share the misanthropic and anti-cosmic values of the order, and then be ready to dedicate his/her entire existence to following his/her true will in accordance with the dark gods. Becoming an initiate is a long and hard process and can take several years."

Some members of Dissection were very involved in the Misanthropic Luciferian Order. Former bassist, Haakon Forwald of Disiplin, withdrew from Dissection, saying it was partly in order to concentrate on his esoteric studies.

== Band members ==
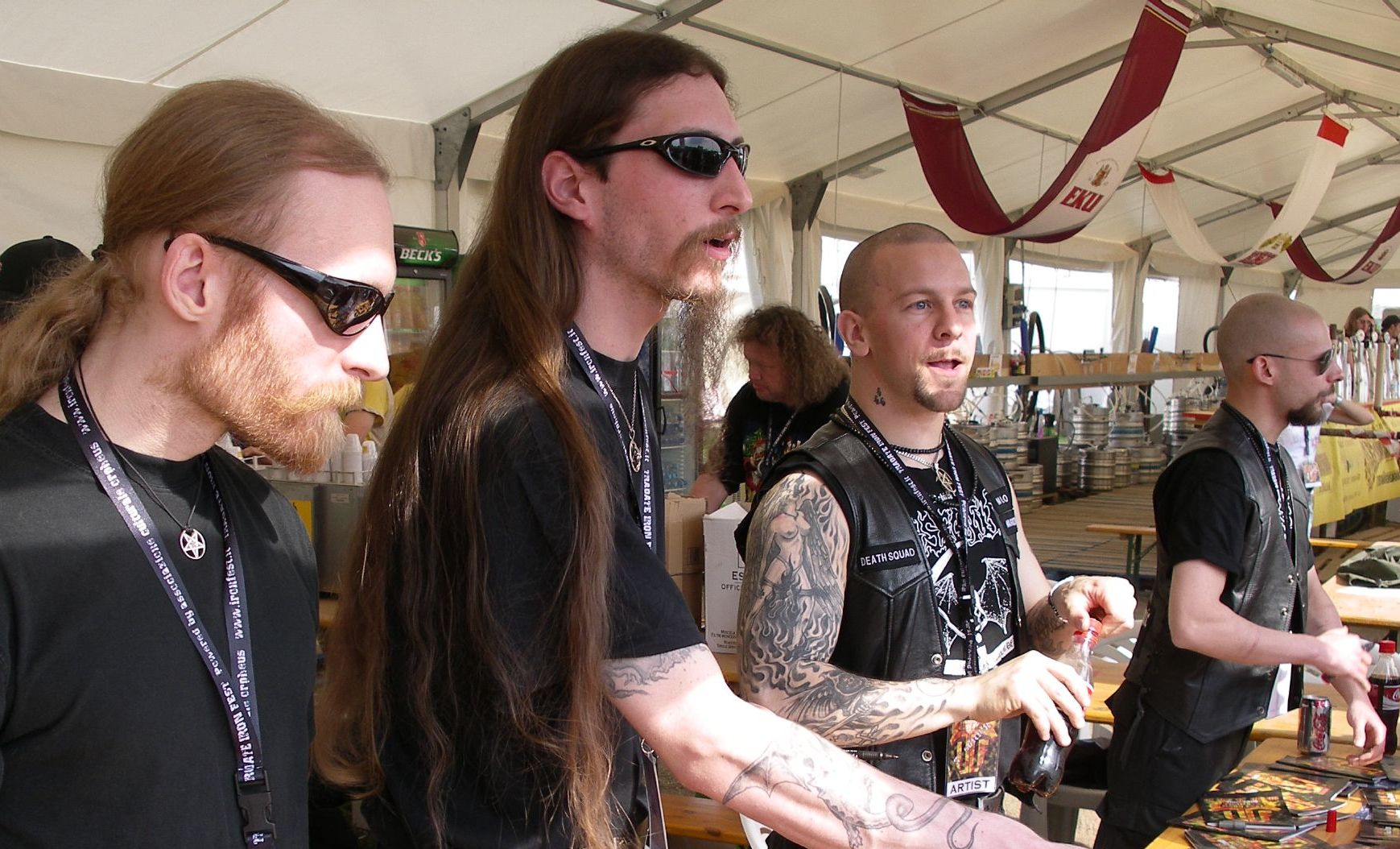
Dissection at a meet and greet in Italy in 2005. From left to right: Tomas Asklund, Brice LeClercq, Jon Nödtveidt and Set Teitan.

=== Final line-up ===
- Jon Nödtveidt – vocals, lead guitar (1989–1997, 2004–2006; died 2006)
- Set Teitan – rhythm guitar, backing vocals (2004–2006)
- Tomas Asklund – drums (2004–2006)

=== Former members ===
- Peter Palmdahl – bass (1989–1997)
- John Zwetsloot – guitar (1990–1995)
- Ole Öhman – drums (1990–1995)
- Tobias "Tobbe" Kjellgren – drums (1995–1997)
- Johan Norman – guitar (1995–1997)
- Brice LeClercq – bass (2004–2005)
- Haakon Forwald – bass (2005)

=== Live session musicians ===
- Emil Nödtveidt – bass (1997)
- Erik Danielsson – bass (2005–2006)

== Discography ==
=== Studio albums ===
Title	Album details	Sales	Peak chart positions
Title	Album details	Sales	SWE
The Somberlain	Released: 3 December 1993; Label: No Fashion Records; Formats: CD, CS, LP, digital download		57
Storm of the Light's Bane	Released: 17 November 1995; Label: Nuclear Blast; Formats: CD, CS, LP, digital download	US: 8,939+	—
Reinkaos	Released: 30 April 2006; Label: Black Horizon; Formats: CD, CS, LP, digital download		—

=== Compilation albums ===
Title	Album details	Notes
The Past Is Alive (The Early Mischief)	Released: 20 July 1997; Label: Necropolis Records; Formats: CD	
I Am the Great Shadow	Released: 1 August 2021; Label: Darkness Shall Rise Productions; Formats: CS	Limited to 1,500 copies

=== Live albums ===
Title	Album details
Live Legacy	Released: 17 February 2003; Label: Nuclear Blast; Formats: CD, digital download
Live in Stockholm 2004	Released: 22 September 2009; Label: Escapi Music; Formats: CD, digital download
Live Rebirth	Released: March 2010; Label: High Roller Records; Formats: LP
Midsummer masacre	Released: June 14th 2022; Label: Black Horizon music; Formats: Digital

=== EPs ===
Title	Album details	Notes
Into Infinite Obscurity	Released: 5 September 1991; Label: Corpse Grinder Records; Formats: LP	Limited to 1,000 copies
Where Dead Angels Lie	Released: 26 April 1996; Label: Nuclear Blast; Formats: CD	

=== Single ===
Title	Single details	Notes	Peak chart positions
Title	Single details	Notes	SWE
Maha Kali	Released: 10 November 2004; Label: Escapi Music; Formats: CD	Limited to 1,000 copies	50

=== Demo ===
Title	Demo details
The Grief Prophecy	Released: February 1991; Label: Self-released; Formats: CS

=== Video albums ===
Title	Album details	Peak chart positions
Title	Album details	SWE
Live & Plugged Vol. 2 (split with Dimmu Borgir)	Released: 1997; Label: Nuclear Blast; Formats: VHS	—
Rebirth of Dissection	Released: 29 July 2006; Label: Escapi Music; Formats: DVD	5
— denotes a recording that did not chart or was not released in that territory.
