= 2003 in heavy metal music =

This is a timeline documenting the events of heavy metal in the year 2003.

== Newly formed bands ==
- A Day to Remember
- The Abominable Iron Sloth
- Abysmal Dawn
- Adler's Appetite
- Aina
- Airbourne
- Anagnorisis
- Anubis Gate
- As Blood Runs Black
- As They Sleep
- At All Cost
- August Burns Red
- Baroness
- Battlecross
- Bleed the Sky
- Blessed by a Broken Heart
- Bloody Panda
- Born of Osiris
- Carach Angren
- The Chariot
- Communic
- Conducting from the Grave
- Dååth
- Damageplan
- Darkwater
- Demonoid
- Diablo Swing Orchestra
- Eisbrecher
- Emmure
- Furia
- Head Control System
- Hypno5e
- In Vain
- Jesu
- Job for a Cowboy
- Jon Oliva's Pain
- Kayo Dot
- Kroda
- Leaves' Eyes
- Les Discrets
- Lyriel
- Midnight
- Myrkgrav
- Nadja
- NadimaČ
- Ne Obliviscaris
- Neaera
- Om
- Parkway Drive
- Powerwolf
- Rosetta
- The Ruins of Beverast
- Skeletonwitch
- The Sword
- Sybreed
- Tesseract
- Threat Signal
- Through the Eyes of the Dead
- Thulcandra
- Trollfest
- Turmion Kätilöt
- Urfaust
- Wintersun
- Wolfchant
- Wolves in the Throne Room

== Reformed bands ==
- 24-7 Spyz
- Child's Play
- Count Raven
- Fear Factory
- Judas Priest
- Killing Joke
- MC5
- Primus
- Stryper
- Twisted Sister

== Albums ==
- 8 Foot Sativa – Season for Assault
- Aborted – Goremageddon: The Saw and the Carnage Done
- Akercocke – Choronozon
- Alien Ant Farm – truANT
- Alice Cooper – The Eyes of Alice Cooper
- All Shall Perish – Hate, Malice, Revenge
- Anaal Nathrakh – When Fire Rains Down from the Sky, Mankind Will Reap as It Has Sown (EP)
- Anthrax – We've Come for You All
- Apocalyptica – Reflections
- Arch Enemy – Anthems of Rebellion
- As I Lay Dying – Frail Words Collapse
- Avenged Sevenfold – Waking the Fallen
- Bathory – Nordland II
- Between the Buried and Me – The Silent Circus
- Belphegor – Lucifer Incestus
- Biohazard – Kill or Be Killed
- The Black Dahlia Murder – Unhallowed
- Black Label Society – The Blessed Hellride
- Blood Stain Child – Mystic Your Heart
- Bon Jovi – This Left Feels Right (Compilation)
- Boysetsfire – Tomorrow Come Today
- Brujeria – The Mexecutioner! - The Best of Brujeria (Compilation)
- Cannibal Corpse – 15 Year Killing Spree (Box set)
- Children of Bodom – Hate Crew Deathroll
- Chimaira – The Impossibility of Reason
- Circle II Circle – Watching in Silence
- Coal Chamber – Giving the Devil His Due (Compilation)
- Concept – Reason and Truth
- Cog – "Open Up" (maxi single)
- Cradle of Filth – Damnation and a Day
- The Darkness – Permission to Land
- Deathstars – Synthetic Generation
- Decrepit Birth – ...And Time Begins
- Deep Purple – Bananas
- Default – Elocation
- Deftones – Deftones
- Deicide – The Best of Deicide (Compilation)
- Destruction – Metal Discharge
- DevilDriver – DevilDriver
- The Devin Townsend Band – Accelerated Evolution
- Dimension Zero – This Is Hell
- Dimmu Borgir – Death Cult Armageddon
- Dir En Grey - Vulgar
- Divinity Destroyed – Divinity Destroyed (EP)
- DragonForce – Valley of the Damned
- Dream Evil – Evilized
- Dream Theater – Train of Thought
- Enslaved – Below the Lights
- Entombed – Inferno
- Epica – The Phantom Agony
- Evanescence – Fallen
- Evergrey – Recreation Day
- Every Time I Die – Hot Damn!
- Faith – Salvation Lies Within
- Faith No More – This Is It: The Best of Faith No More (Compilation)
- Fear Factory – Hatefiles (Compilation)
- Finntroll – Visor om slutet (EP)
- Fireball Ministry – The Second Great Awakening
- Firewind – Burning Earth
- From Autumn to Ashes – The Fiction We Live
- Galneryus – The Flag of Punishment
- Garrobos - Jinetes Calavera
- Godhead – Evolver
- Godsmack – Faceless
- Gojira – The Link
- Gojira – Maciste All'Inferno (EP)
- Gorgoroth – Twilight of the Idols
- Graveworm – Engraved in Black
- Hanzel und Gretyl - Über Alles
- Hatebreed – The Rise of Brutality
- Helloween – Rabbit Don't Come Easy
- Hortus Animae – Waltzing Mephisto
- Ill Nino – Confession
- Incubus – Live at Lollapalooza 2003 (Live)
- Integrity – To Die For
- Iron Maiden – Dance of Death
- Ion Dissonance – Breathing Is Irrelevant
- Jane's Addiction – Strays
- Kamelot – Epica
- Katatonia – Viva Emptiness
- Kayo Dot – Choirs of the Eye
- Killing Joke – Killing Joke
- King Diamond – The Best of King Diamond (Compilation)
- King Diamond – The Puppet Master
- Kiss – Kiss Symphony: Alive IV (Live)
- Korn – Take a Look in the Mirror
- Kreator – Live Kreation (Live)
- Krisiun – Works of Carnage
- Lamb of God – As the Palaces Burn
- Lanfear – The Art Effect
- Leviathan – The Tenth Sub Level of Suicide
- Life of Agony - The Best of Life of Agony (Compilation)
- Limp Bizkit – Results May Vary
- Linkin Park – Meteora
- Living Colour – Collideøscope
- Macabre – Murder Metal
- Machine Head – Through the Ashes of Empires
- Malevolent Creation - The Best of Malevolent Creation (Compilation)
- Marduk – World Funeral
- Marilyn Manson – The Golden Age of Grotesque
- Masterplan – Masterplan
- Matchbook Romance – West for Wishing (EP)
- Memento – Beginnings
- Mercyful Fate – The Best of Mercyful Fate (Compilation)
- Metallica – St. Anger
- Ministry – Animositisomina
- Misanthrope – Sadistic Sex Daemon
- Mnemic – Mechanical Spin Phenomena
- Monstrosity – Rise to Power
- Moonspell – The Antidote
- Morbid Angel – Heretic
- Motörhead – Live at Brixton Academy (Live)
- Mushroomhead – XIII
- Neil Turbin – Threatcon Delta
- Nevermore – Enemies of Reality
- Nightrage – Sweet Vengeance
- Ningen Isu – Shura bayashi
- Norther – Mirror of Madness
- Nothingface – Skeletons
- No-Big-Silence – Unreleased
- Occult – Elegy for the Weak
- Old Man's Child – In Defiance of Existence
- One Minute Silence – One Lie Fits All
- Opeth – Damnation
- Overkill – Killbox 13
- Ozzy Osbourne - The Essential Ozzy Osbourne (Compilation)
- Pantera – The Best of Pantera: Far Beyond the Great Southern Cowboys' Vulgar Hits! (Compilation)
- Pitchshifter – Bootlegged, Distorted, Remixed and Uploaded (Compilation)
- Place of Skulls – With Vision
- P.O.D. – Payable on Death
- Poison the Well – You Come Before You
- Psycroptic – The Scepter of the Ancients
- Queensrÿche – Tribe
- Rage – Soundchaser
- RAMP – Nude
- Royal Hunt – Eyewitness
- Rush – Rush in Rio (Live)
- Seven Witches – Passage to the Other Side
- Six Feet Under – Bringer of Blood
- Six Feet Under - Double Dead (Live)
- Skid Row – Thickskin
- Skillet – Collide
- Sepultura – Roorback
- Sevendust – Seasons
- Slayer – Soundtrack to the Apocalypse (Box set)
- Soilwork – Figure Number Five
- Solefald – In Harmonia Universali
- Sonata Arctica – Winterheart's Guild
- Spawn of Possession – Cabinet
- Static-X – Shadow Zone
- Strapping Young Lad – Strapping Young Lad
- Stratovarius – Elements, Pt. 1
- Stratovarius – Elements, Pt. 2
- Stryper – 7: The Best of Stryper (Compilation)
- Staind – 14 Shades of Grey
- Theocracy – Theocracy
- The Lord Weird Slough Feg – Traveller
- Throwdown – Haymaker
- Three Days Grace – Three Days Grace
- Tourniquet – Where Moth and Rust Destroy
- Transport League – Multiple Organ Harvest
- Trivium – Ember to Inferno
- Type O Negative – Life Is Killing Me
- Týr – Eric the Red
- uneXpect – wE, Invaders (EP)
- Virgin Black – Elegant... and Dying
- Xandria – Kill the Sun

== Disbandments ==
- Coal Chamber
- Five Pointe O
- Last Tribe
- Limbonic Art
- Immortal
- Pitchshifter
- Pantera
- Reveille
- Rollins Band (reformed in 2006)

== Events ==
- After months of auditions, Robert Trujillo, bassist of Ozzy Osbourne and former bassist of Suicidal Tendencies, was announced as Metallica's new bassist, replacing Jason Newsted.
- After nearly a decade of the show being off the air, MTV2 announced the resurrection of Headbangers' Ball with Jamey Jasta as host.
- Vocalist Matt Barlow announced his departure from Iced Earth.
- Stryper reformed with all original members.
- Visions of Atlantis vocalist Christian Stani and keyboardist Chris Kamper parted ways with the band, being replaced by Mario Plank and Miro Holly, respectively.
- In July, Judas Priest announced the return of Rob Halford on vocals.

== Deaths ==
- January 10 – Einar André Fredriksen, bassist, vocalist, and songwriter of Funeral, died by suicide at the age of 29.
- March 16 – Teemu "Somnium" Raimoranta, founding member and guitarist of Finntroll, guitarist of Impaled Nazarene, and former guitarist of Thy Serpent, died from injuries after falling from a bridge.
- November 18 – Michael Arnold Kamen, composer (especially of film scores), orchestral arranger and conductor, who collaborated with numerous artists from various genres, including Pink Floyd, Rush, Guns 'N Roses, and Metallica (S&M), died from a heart attack at the age of 55.

Preceded by 2002	Heavy Metal Timeline; 2003	Succeeded by 2004
