= Peripeteia (disambiguation) =

Peripeteia is a reversal of circumstances within a work of literature.

Peripeteia may also refer to:

- Peripeteia (album), a 2016 album by black metal band Anagnorisis
- Peripeteia (video game), an upcoming video game
- Peripeteia, a film by Abigail Child
- Peripeteia, a 2005 album by Cheer Chen
- Peripeteia, a 2020 album by Rafael Anton Irisarri

== See also ==
- Perepiteia
