= Massive Conspiracy Against All Life =

Studio album by Leviathan
- Released: 24 March 2008
- Genre: Black metal, dark ambient
- Length: 62:16
- Label: Moribund Cult

Leviathan chronology
The Blind Wound (2006)	Massive Conspiracy Against All Life (2008)	True Traitor, True Whore (2011)

Professional ratings
Review scores
Source	Rating
Pitchfork Media	(8/10)

Massive Conspiracy Against All Life is the fourth full-length album by San Francisco-based one-man black metal band Leviathan.

There was much controversy over the release of this album, which was originally slated for a summer release in 2007. Supposedly Wrest tried to release the album under the Lurker of Chalice moniker via Blake Judd's Battle Kommand Records, and it was originally going to be titled Perverse Calculus. But Moribund's lawyer's issued a cease and desist order. This also affected and delayed the Nachtmystium / Leviathan split album which was to be released on Southern Lord Records in 2007.

The vinyl version of Massive Conspiracy Against All Life was released on May 20, 2008, via Moribund Records. The LP was limited to 500 copies on black vinyl and 500 copies on red vinyl.

This was the first Leviathan LP to feature acoustic drums as opposed to the electronic drums Wrest used on most of the band's prior releases.

The album was inspired by the death of Wrest's girlfriend – the song "VI-XI-VI" refers to June 11, 2006, in Roman numerals, the date of her suicide.

== Track listing ==
No.	Title	Length
1.	"Vesture Dipped in the Blood of Morning"	5:22
2.	"Merging With Sword, Onto Them"	10:58
3.	"Made as the Stale Wine of Wrath"	8:44
4.	"VI-XI-VI"	7:09
5.	"Receive the World"	7:48
6.	"Vulgar Asceticism"	9:20
7.	"Noisome Ash Crown"	12:55
Total length:		62:16

For unknown reasons, the pre-release album leak featured different track titles, despite containing exactly the same songs. (The CD-Text information of the released CD still refers to these alternate titles, and Wrest's Lurker of Chalice moniker instead of Leviathan.) The pre-release track listing was:

No.	Title	Length
1.	"Sacred Scars"	5:22
2.	"Seamless Garment as the Morning"	10:58
3.	"Last Breath of Expiation"	8:44
4.	"6116"	7:09
5.	"Phosphoros"	7:48
6.	"Flagellum Raised to the Sky"	9:20
7.	"Sanies Obnuntio"	12:55
