= Hacavitz (band) =

Mexican extreme metal band

- Origin: Querétaro City, Querétaro, Mexico
- Genres: Blackened death metal; Black metal
- Years active: 2003–2010; 2011–present
- Labels: Moribund Records
- Members: Antimo Buonnano; César "Led" Sánchez; Fernando León Cortés; Alan Di González
- Past members: See below

Hacavitz is a Mexican extreme metal band formed in 2003. The band took their name from the Mayan god Jacawitz. The lyrical themes include death, darkness, and pre-Hispanic mythology. Since its formation, the band has released six studio albums, two EPs, five split albums, and two compilation albums.

== History ==
Hacavitz was founded by Antimo Buonnano and Oscar García in 2003.

The band's first two studio albums titled "Venganza" (Vengeance) and "Katun" were released through the label Moribund Records. In 2010, they released their third studio album Metztli Obscura, which was released through both Embrace My Funeral and Moribund Records. After disbanding following the release of Metztli Obscura, Buonnano reformed Hacavitz shortly afterward, and in 2015, they released their fourth studio album "Darkness Beyond" in which the band switched to black metal and was released by the label Dark Descent Records and Concreto Records in the United States and Mexico respectively. Hacavitz then released their fifth studio album "Nex Nihil", which was originally released in August 2017 and later released on 28 September 2018 on Moribund Recurds. It maintains its dark and dense essence of black metal that it has been displaying in the band's two previous albums. In 2020, they released 2 splits, "Ad Noctem" with Espectrum Mortis (Spain) on VOMIT Records and "Tercer Nadir Venenoso" with Valdraveth and Theurgia on MAT Records.

In January 2024, Hacavitz announced that they would release their sixth studio album, entitled Muerte, which occurred the following month.

== Members ==
=== Current members ===
- Antimo Buonnano – guitars, bass, vocals (2003–present)
- César "Led" Sánchez – drums (2011–present)
- Fernando León Cortés – guitar (2018–present)
- Alan Di González – bass (2022–present)

=== Live members ===
- Edgar García – bass (2013–2014)
- Iván Ochoa – guitar (2014–2020)

=== Former members ===
- Alberto Allende – drums (2010–2011)
- Diego – bass (2013)
- Óscar García – drums (2003–2010)
- Eduardo Guevara – guitars (2003–2006)
- Antonio Nolasco – bass (2003–2013)
- Ulises Sánchez – bass (2014–2016)

== Discography ==
Studio albums

- Venganza (2005)
- Katun (2007)
- Metztli Obscura (2010)
- Darkness Beyond (2015)
- Nex Nihil (2017)
- Muerte (2024)

EP

- Hacavitz (2004)
- Ojpanna (2012)

Singles

- "Lusting the Dead of the Night" (2005)

Split

- Apocalyptik Blasphemy of the Revolutionists (split with Zygoatsis) (2006)
- Rituals of the Night (split with Thornspawn) (2008)
- Hacavitz & Shit (split with Shit) (2015)
- Ad Noctem (split with Espectrum Mortis) (2020)
- Tercer nadir venenoso (split with Valdraveth and Theurgia) (2020)

Compilation albums

- Kauitl Palaktik (2017)
- Jun K'aal Xiutin (2023)
