= Night Electric Night =

Studio album by Deathstars
- Released: 30 January 2009
- Recorded: November 2007 – December 2008 in New York City and Sweden
- Genres: Industrial metal, gothic metal
- Length: 44:12, Gold Edition 54:47
- Label: Nuclear Blast
- Producer: Nightmare Industries

Deathstars chronology
Termination Bliss (2006)	Night Electric Night (2009)	The Perfect Cult (2014)

Singles from Night Electric Night
- 1. "Death Dies Hard" Released: 12 December 2008

Cover of the Gold Edition

Professional ratings
Review scores
Source	Rating
Lords of Metal	8.5/10 stars
The Tune	6.5/10 stars

Night Electric Night is the third album by Swedish metal band Deathstars. It was released on 30 January 2009 by Nuclear Blast. The album was initially recorded under the working title Deathglam. The album's first single, "Death Dies Hard", made its airplay debut on Stockholm's Bandit Rock 106.3FM. Deathstars have now also put the song "Night Electric Night" on their Myspace page.

== Recording ==
The album was recorded mostly in a studio in Sweden; however, the album was also recorded in part in New York City. The band completed recording the album at New York in December 2008.

== Album title ==
Production of the third album by Deathstars was revealed in an interview with the band conducted by Anthony Morgan of Lucem Fero in early 2008, where it was referred to by its working title, Deathglam. Vocalist Whiplasher Bernadotte expanded on the title, saying, ". . . it'll just continue with the deathglam that we play. In terms of this new album's style, I think it's more Deathstars than ever . . ."

Recently, the band has announced on their official website that the record has been re-dubbed Night Electric Night. Whiplasher Bernadotte has stated that this is because calling the album Deathglam would be too "obvious".

== Track listing ==
No.	Title	Length
1.	"Chertograd"	4:45
2.	"Night Electric Night"	4:04
3.	"Death Dies Hard"	3:21
4.	"Mark of the Gun"	4:02
5.	"Via the End"	4:07
6.	"Blood Stains Blondes"	3:15
7.	"Babylon"	4:18
8.	"The Fuel Ignites"	4:00
9.	"Arclight"	4:35
10.	"Venus in Arms"	4:02
11.	"Opium"	3:43
Total length:		44:12

Gold Edition bonus tracks
No.	Title	Length
12.	"Night Electric Night" (The Night Ignites Remix)	3:04
13.	"Via the End" (Piano Version)	3:27
14.	"Night Electric Night" (feat. Adrian Erlandsson)	4:04
Total length:		54:47

Gold Edition bonus DVD
No.	Title	Length
1.	"Death Dies Hard" (Video)
2.	"Virtue to Vice" (Video)
3.	"Blitzkrieg" (Video)
4.	"Cyanide" (Video)
5.	"Syndrome" (Video)
6.	"Synthetic Generation" (Video)
7.	"Death Dies Hard" (The Making of)
8.	"Virtue to Vice" (The Making of)
9.	"Blitzkrieg" (The Making of)
10.	"Cyanide" (The Making of)

Platinum Edition bonus CD
No.	Title	Length
1.	"Opium" (The God Particle Remix by Pzy-Clone/The Kovenant)
2.	"Trinity Fields" (Drop's Synthetic Evolution by Drop/Sybreed)
3.	"Babylon" (Underworld Lounge Remix by Nightmare Industries)
4.	"Chertograd" (Junkyard Baby Remix by Dope Stars Inc.)
5.	"Opium" (Nightfuture of Century Remix)
6.	"Babylon" (Remixed by Matt LaPlant)
7.	"Last Ammunition" (Xe-NONE Remix) (Competition Winner)
8.	"New Dead Nation" (Of These Hope) (Competition Winner)
9.	"Fuel Ignites" (Catronics Child of Light Mix) (Competition Winner)
10.	"Black Medicines" (Previously Unreleased)
11.	"Division X" (Previously Unreleased)
12.	"Revolution Exodus" (Unreleased Demo)
13.	"Our God the Drugs" (Unreleased Demo)
14.	"Genocide" (Unreleased Demo)
15.	"The Fuel Ignites" (Fuel For Cowboys Remix by Skinny Disco)
16.	"Chertograd" (Necrocock / Masters)
17.	"The Fuel Ignites" (Phoebus Remix)

== Personnel ==
- Whiplasher Bernadotte – lead vocals
- Nightmare Industries – lead guitar, keyboards
- Cat Casino – rhythm guitar
- Skinny Disco – bass, backing vocals
- Bone W. Machine – drums
- Ann Ekberg – female vocal
