= Tentacles of Whorror =

Studio album by Leviathan
- Released: 16 June 2004
- Recorded: December 2003 – January 2004
- Genres: Black metal, dark ambient
- Length: 72:30
- Label: Moribund Cult
- Producers: Wrest, Odin "The Old Goat"

Leviathan chronology
Crebain / Leviathan (2004)	Tentacles of Whorror (2004)	The Speed of Darkness (2004)

Professional ratings
Review scores
Source	Rating
Allmusic	4/5 stars

Tentacles of Whorror is the second full-length album by Leviathan. It was recorded at L.D. 50 Productions between December 2003 and January 2004 with production mastering being handled by Drucifer at Nettlingham Audio. It was released on June 16, 2004 and was distributed by Seattle-based underground record label Moribund Cult. It features lyrics by Maija the Goatess on the track "A Necessary Mutilation".

In 2013, Decibel ranked Tentacles of Whorror at number 98 on its list of the Top 100 Black Metal Albums of All Time.

== Track listing ==
No.	Title	Length
1.	"What Fresh Hell"	4:24
2.	"Heir To The Noose of Ghoul"	4:27
3.	"Cut, With The Night, Into Mine Heart"	5:13
4.	"A Bouquet of Blood For Skull"	4:16
5.	"Deciphering Legend Within The Serpent's Briar"	6:48
6.	"A Necessary Mutilation"	4:40
7.	"Vexed and Vomit Hexed"	6:48
8.	"Tentacles of Whorror (Revel the Tyrant)"	9:09
9.	"Requiem For A Turd World"	7:45
10.	"Blood Red and True: Part 3 (Plummeting Obscure)"	3:42
11.	"Mouth Orifice Bizarre"	6:49
12.	"The History of Rape"	8:19
Total length:		72:20
