= Cyanide (disambiguation) =

Cyanide is a class of chemical compounds.

Cyanide may also refer to:

== Cyanide as poison ==
- Cyanide poisoning, a form of poisoning that occurs when a living organism is exposed to a compound that produces cyanide ions when dissolved in water
- Cyanide fishing, an illegal form of fishing common in South East Asia, which usually uses the chemical compound sodium cyanide

== Film ==
- Cyanide (2006 film), a 2006 Indian Kannada language film
- Cyanide (1930 film), a 1930 German drama film

== Music ==
- "Cyanide" (song), a 2008 song by Metallica
- "Cyanide", a song by Bad Religion from their album The Dissent of Man (2010)
- "Cyanide", a song by Deathstars from their album Termination Bliss (2006)
- "Cyanide", a song by Daniel Caesar from his album Case Study 01 (2019)
- "Cyanide", a song by The Chainsmokers from their album "So Far So Good" (2022)

== Other uses ==
- Cyanide (company), a game development studio
- Cyanide millipede, a millipede found in the moist forests along the Pacific coast of North America
- Cyanide process, a metallurgical technique for extracting gold from low-grade ore
- Cyanide (gamer) (1994–2026), Finnish League of Legends player

== See also ==
- Category:Cyanides
