= Metztli Obscura =

Studio album by Hacavitz
- Released: June 22, 2010
- Recorded: Inzonic Lab. July 2009
- Genre: Blackened death metal
- Length: 37:10
- Label: Moribund Records
- Producer: Hacavitz and J. Carlos Padilla

Hacavitz chronology
Katun (2007)	Metztli Obscura (2010)	Darkness Beyond (2015)

Professional ratings
Review scores
Source	Rating
AllMusic	3.5/5 stars
Metal Storm	8.0/10

Metztli Obscura is the third full-length album by the Mexican extreme metal band Hacavitz. It is the last album to feature Oscar Garcia on drums and percussion.

== Track listing ==
All tracks are written by Hacavitz

No.	Title	Length
1.	"To Meet Again"	3:23
2.	"Ye Parani Eojtocomol"	4:39
3.	"Towards Black Pest"	4:20
4.	"Hablan los Muertos"	4:39
5.	"Most Unclean"	3:40
6.	"Cauitl Glalticpac"	5:33
7.	"Angstcraftwerk"	4:14
8.	"Sulphur Winds"	3:34
9.	"Gorajtzin Miqui"	3:08

== Credits ==
- Antimo Buonnano – guitar, bass, vocals
- Oscar Garcia – drums, percussion
- Engineered, mixed and mastered by J. Carlos Padilla
- Produced by Hacavitz and J. Carlos Padilla
- All music and lyrics by Hacavitz
- Guest vocals in "Towards Black Pest" by Shyaithan (Impiety)
- Cover art by Santiago Armengod
- Layout by Arthur Axegrinder
