= Cast the first stone =

Cast the first stone may refer to:

- Jesus and the woman taken in adultery, a Biblical parable in which Jesus says, "...let him who is without sin cast the first stone."
- Cast the First Stone (Ensign album), 1999
- Cast the First Stone (Ion Dissonance album), 2016
- "Cast the First Stone", a song by Stephen Marley from Old Soul, 2023
- "Cast the First Stone", a song by Slayer from Repentless, 2015
- Cast the First Stone, a 1989 television film starring Jill Eikenberry
