= Ole Öhman =

Swedish drummer

- Also known as: Bone W. Machine
- Born: Ole Christian Öhman; 1973 (age 52–53)
- Origin: Sweden
- Genres: Industrial metal, black metal, death metal
- Occupation: Musician
- Instrument: Drums
- Years active: 1988–2009
- Formerly of: Dissection; Deathstars; Swordmaster; Ophthalamia

Ole Christian Öhman (born 1973) also known as Bone W. Machine, is a Swedish drummer who was a member of the metal bands Dissection from 1990 to 1995, Ophthalamia from 1995 to 1998, and Deathstars from 2000 to 2011. He appeared on two studio albums with Dissection and Ophthalamia and three albums with Deathstars.

== Career ==
Öhman joined Dissection in 1990 and played drums on the band's 1993 debut album The Somberlain. He appeared on their sophomore album, Storm of the Light's Bane, before leaving the band in 1995. That same year, Öhman joined Emil Nödtveidt in the bands Swordmaster and Ophthalamia. In 2000, the pair formed the band Deathstars. The band released their debut album, Synthetic Generation, in 2002, followed by their sophomore album, Termination Bliss, in 2006. In 2008, it was announced that Öhman would not partake in Deathstars' European spring tour with Korn for personal reasons.

In January 2009, Deathstars released their third studio album, Night Electric Night. In October of that same year, it was announced that Öhman had been diagnosed with a severe case of tennis elbow in his left arm and was forced to leave Deathstars' ongoing tour. A show in Frankfurt had to be shortened after the drummer had performed for 45 minutes in severe pain and long-time friend of the band Oscar Leander was subsequently brought in as a touring replacement. Two years later, it was announced that Leander had replaced Öhman as the band's drummer permanently.

== Discography ==
=== With Dissection ===
Studio albums

- The Somberlain (1993)
- Storm of the Light's Bane (1995)

EPs

- Into Infinite Obscurity (1991)
- Where Dead Angels Lie (1996)

=== With Ophthalamia ===
Studio albums

- A Long Journey (1998)
- Dominion (1998)

=== With Deathstars ===
Studio albums

- Synthetic Generation (2002)
- Termination Bliss (2006)
- Night Electric Night (2009)
