= Transmissions from Uranus =

1997 Hanzel und Gretyl album

Studio album by Hanzel und Gretyl
- Released: May 27, 1997
- Recorded: Kinderland Studios, New York City; 1995–1997
- Genre: Industrial rock, electro-industrial
- Length: 52:25
- Label: Energy Records
- Producer: Hanzel und Gretyl

Hanzel und Gretyl chronology
Ausgeflippt (1995)	Transmissions from Uranus (1997)	Über alles (2003)

Transmissions from Uranus is the second full-length album by American industrial metal band Hanzel und Gretyl. It was released in 1997 via Energy Records. It followed the pace set by the band's debut release, Ausgeflippt, as its style was very electronically oriented. The album enjoyed significant success, with the song "9D Galactic Center" included on the soundtrack to Mortal Kombat Annihilation. This was the band's last release on Energy Records, as the company went out of business in 1998. It was also the band's last release with a focus on machines and space and the last album to feature any song performed in a language other than German or English, with the song "Astronafti" performed in Greek, as their image changed radically upon the release of their third album, Über alles, which was a satire of totalitarian regimes.

The CD contained a video game named "The Alienator", which could be installed and played on computers at the time of its release. The objective was to transform the two band members into alien-like space creatures.

== Track listing ==
No.	Title	Length
1.	"Black Forest Galaxy"	1:58
2.	"9D Galactic Center"	1:20
3.	"Pleiadian Agenda"	3:42
4.	"Take Me to Your Leader"	3:55
5.	"Zeta Reticula"	0:33
6.	"Komet Ride"	4:29
7.	"Trance Planet Vortex"	6:48
8.	"Robot Logik"	3:57
9.	"Helium Popsicles"	1:40
10.	"Starfucker"	3:12
11.	"Hyper Erotic Joy Helmet"	0:42
12.	"Mutant Starseed Creation"	4:57
13.	"Fireball XL5"	2:22
14.	"Hallo Berlin"	1:38
15.	"Astronafti"	3:37
16.	"Om Zentrale Station"	7:35
Total length:		52:25

== Credits ==
- Vas Kallas: lead vocals, guitar, assistant programmer
- Kaizer von Loopy: programming, guitar, backup vocals
- Ginger Bread: bass
- Seven: drums
- Mixed by Hanzel und Gretyl and Bryce Goggin at Kinderland Studios, New York City, and Baby Monster Studios, New York City
- "Hallo Berlin" sung by Kevin McGrory
- Mastered by Scott Hull at Masterdisk
- "The Alienator" developed by Point.Five

== Reception ==
Professional ratings
Review scores
Source	Rating
AllMusic	4/5 stars
ChroniclesOfChaos	9/10 stars
DARKSIDE	6/10 stars

CMJ New Music Monthly and Sonic Options Network both gave the album positive reviews. Lollipop Magazine noted that the album was heavier than the previous album, Ausgeflippt, with "the guitars mixed higher and the beats played harder." Maximum Volume Music said that the album "was praised for its progressive musical stylings and groundbreaking technological advances."
