= Leviathan (musical project) =

American black metal solo project

- Origin: San Francisco, California, U.S.
- Genres: Black metal, dark ambient
- Years active: 1998–present
- Labels: Moribund Cult, Profound Lore Records
- Members: Jef Whitehead

Leviathan is an American black metal solo project that started in 1998 by Jef Whitehead under the pseudonym Wrest. Whitehead records all instruments and performs all vocals.

Whitehead is a tattoo artist and known for his other project, Lurker of Chalice, which released two demos and one full-length album in 2005 before it dissolved.

== History ==
Leviathan released the debut album The Tenth Sub Level of Suicide in 2003. Whitehead recorded it on a Tascam four-track tape recorder. In 2005, Whitehead released the only Lurker of Chalice album. He contributed to Sunn O)))'s 2005 album Black One, which received an 8.9 "Best New Music" review from Pitchfork.

Despite early problems, Massive Conspiracy Against All Life was released on March 24, 2008 in Europe and March 25, 2008 in North America. Whitehead briefly ended Leviathan after its release, allegedly due to a legal struggle with Moribund Records. Due to these issues, Whiteheadt thought the project had no future and felt "raped by a label." During this time, Whitehead refused all interview requests.

A second Lurker of Chalice album, Perverse Calculus, was planned for release on Blake Judd's Battle Kommand label, but Moribund's contract with Whitehead stated that he could not release music on other labels. As a result, Moribund released Massive Conspiracy Against All Life, and Whitehead was legally prohibited from releasing new Leviathan material for six months.

On January 9, 2011, Whitehead was arrested and charged with one count of aggravated domestic battery and one count of criminal sexual assault after allegedly choking his girlfriend unconscious and penetrating her with a tattoo machine. Whitehead faced a 34-count indictment, which carried a 60-year sentence, but the state dropped 28 counts before trial. In 2012, he was found not guilty on all except one count of aggravated domestic battery, which court documents indicated referred to the strangulation. Whitehead was sentenced to two years of probation.

Whitehead's legal issues influenced his fifth album True Traitor, True Whore, which was released in 2011. Four years later, Whitehead said that "True Traitor sucks. That record is fucking terrible." In 2023, Whitehead claimed that the album "is not about my Jane Doe" but moreso the Whore of Babylon, Lilith and Eve.

Leviathan released Scar Sighted on 3 March 2015 through Profound Lore Records. In 2018, Whitehead revealed that he was working on a seventh Leviathan record, Die to This, but recording was postponed as a result of issues surrounding Whitehead's record store.

Die to This was formally announced in November 2026, with a release date of November 27 via Profound Lore Records. It was promoted with the lead single "The Blade Already Forgotten Your Name".

== Discography ==
=== Studio albums ===
- 2003 – The Tenth Sub Level of Suicide
- 2004 – Tentacles of Whorror
- 2005 – A Silhouette in Splinters
- 2008 – Massive Conspiracy Against All Life
- 2011 – True Traitor, True Whore
- 2015 – Scar Sighted
- 2026 – Die to This

=== EP's and split releases ===
- 2003 – Live In Eternal Sin / The Speed of Darkness (split with Iuvenes)
- 2004 – Leviathan & Crebain (split with Crebain)
- 2004 – Black Metal Against the World (split with Ad Hominem, Funeral Winds and Eternity)
- 2004 – Leviathan & Xasthur (split with Xasthur)
- 2005 – Portrait in Scars (split with Blackdeath)
- 2006 – Leviathan & Sapthuran (split with Sapthuran)
- 2006 – The Speed of Darkness (EP)
- 2006 – The Blind Wound (EP)
- 2009 – Sic Luceat Lux (split with Acherontas)
- 2014 – Leviathan / Krieg (split with Krieg)
- 2018 – In the Valley of Death, Where Black Metal Is King (split with Nachtmystium, digital release)
- 2018 – Crawl / Leviathan (split with Crawl)

=== Demos ===
- 2000 – Leviathan
- 2000 – Time End
- 2000 – Three
- 2000 – MisanthropicNecroBlasphemy
- 2000 – Black of Cult
- 2000 – Shadow of No Light
- 2001 – Seven
- 2001 – Eight
- 2001 – Nine (Inclement Derision)
- 2001 – Ten
- 2001 – Eleven
- 2002 – Howl Mockery at the Cross
- 2002 – White Devil, Black Metal
- 2002 – The Tenth Sub Level of Suicide
- 2002 – Fifteen

=== Compilation albums ===
- 2001 – Intolerance
- 2001 – Sacrifice Love at the Altar of War
- 2002 – Verräter (2 CDs)
- 2005 – Demos Two Thousand
- 2005 – Howl Mockery at the Cross
- 2016 – Leviathan (5 CD boxed set)
- 2017 – The First Sublevel Of Suicide
- 2018 – Unfailing Fall Into Naught
- 2021 – Portrait in Scars / The Speed of Darkness
- 2022 – Shadow of No Light

=== Other appearances ===
- 2005 – "Hissing and Sullen" on Destroyers From The Western Skies: As Night Devours The Sun
- 2007 – "My War" on Within the Church of Thee Overlords
- 2015 – "My War" Flexi-disc single

== Lineup ==
- Wrest (Jef Whitehead) – all instruments, vocals (Twilight, Lurker of Chalice, Nachtmystium, GiftHorse, Steeltoes, GASM)
