= Cursed (Ion Dissonance album) =

Studio album by Ion Dissonance
- Released: August 24, 2010
- Genres: Mathcore, deathcore
- Length: 42:17
- Labels: Century Media; Doom Patrol; Basick

Ion Dissonance chronology
Minus the Herd (2007)	Cursed (2010)	Cast the First Stone (2016)

Cursed is the fourth studio album by the Canadian mathcore band Ion Dissonance, released on August 24, 2010 through Century Media in North America, Doom Patrol Records in Japan, and Basick Records in Europe.

Cursed is the first Ion Dissonance album to feature 8-string guitars, it also contains the first ever song by the band ("Pallor") to include the use of clean vocals.

== Track listing ==
No.	Title	Length
1.	"Cursed"	0:53
2.	"You People are Messed Up"	3:30
3.	"The More Things Change, the More They Stay the Same"	2:32
4.	"This Is the Last Time I Repeat Myself" (featuring Alex Erian of Despised Icon)	4:36
5.	"No Care Ever"	2:55
6.	"After Everything That's Happened, What Did You Expect"	1:53
7.	"We Like to Call This One...Fuck Off"	4:46
8.	"Can Someone Please Explain This to Me?"	2:42
9.	"Disaster in Sight"	2:13
10.	"This Is Considered Mere Formality"	4:26
11.	"This Feels Like the End…"	4:10
12.	"They'll Never Know"	7:48

iTunes Bonus Track
No.	Title	Length
13.	"Pallor" (featuring Aaron Wolff of The End)	6:16

Japan Bonus Track
No.	Title	Length
13.	"After Everything That's Happened, What Did You Expect" (Big Chocolate Remix)

European Bonus Track
No.	Title	Length
13.	"You People Are Messed Up" (Big Chocolate remix)

== Personnel ==
- Kevin McCaughey – vocals
- Antoine Lussier – guitar
- Sebastien Chaput – guitar
- Yannick Desgroseillers – bass
- Jean-François Richard – drums
