= Solace (Ion Dissonance album) =

Studio album by Ion Dissonance
- Released: September 6, 2005
- Recorded: May 2005
- Genre: Mathcore, deathcore, grindcore
- Length: 41:40
- Label: Abacus
- Producer: Pierre Remillard

Ion Dissonance chronology
Breathing Is Irrelevant (2003)	Solace (2005)	Minus the Herd (2007)

Professional ratings
Review scores
Source	Rating
Hour	4/5 stars
Punknews.org	3.5/5 stars

Solace is the second studio album by Canadian band Ion Dissonance. The album was released on September 6, 2005 through Abacus Recordings. The album shows the band beginning to incorporate deathcore influences into their sound, while significantly reducing grindcore elements that the band more significantly featured on their earlier releases.

In October 2023, the band would re-release the album in a remixed/remastered format provided by their bassist Dominic Grimard, as well as a vinyl and digital streaming release.

== Track listing ==
No.	Title	Length
1.	"Play Dead... and I'll Play Along"	4:08
2.	"O.A.S.D."	3:16
3.	"Cleansed by Silence"	3:39
4.	"She's Strychnine"	3:30
5.	"Nil :: Solaris"	2:56
6.	"Lecturing Raskolnikov (or How to Properly Stab an Old Widow)"	3:24
7.	"You're Not Carving Deep Enough"	2:41
8.	"Shut Up, I'm Trying to Worry"	3:46
9.	"Signature"	3:14
10.	"A Prelude of Things Worse to Come"	11:06
Total length:		41:40

== Personnel ==
- Gabriel McCaughry – vocals
- Antoine Lussier − guitar
- Sebastien Chaput − guitar
- Xavier St-Laurent − bass
- Jean-François Richard − drums
