= Hanzel und Gretyl für immer =

2013 Hanzel und Gretyl album

Remix album by Hanzel und Gretyl
- Released: October 8, 2013
- Recorded: Kinderland Studios, New York City
- Genre: Industrial metal, extreme metal
- Length: 46:58
- Label: Metropolis
- Producer: Hanzel und Gretyl

Hanzel und Gretyl chronology
Born to Be Heiled (2012)	Hanzel und Gretyl für immer (2013)	Black Forest Metal (2014)

Hanzel und Gretyl für immer ("Hanzel und Gretyl forever") is a remix album by American industrial metal band Hanzel und Gretyl and a companion album to 2012's Born to Be Heiled. It was released via Metropolis Records on October 8, 2013. The album is a remix album of Born to Be Heiled. All of the remixes were done by KyzrWolf, a side project of Kaizer van Loopy.

== Track listing ==
All tracks are written by Hanzel und Gretyl.

No.	Title	Length
1.	"More German Than German" (KyzrWolf Remix)	3:34
2.	"Unterstutzung 87" (KyzrWolf Remix)	6:31
3.	"Blitzkrieger und Hellriderz" (KyzrWolf Remix)	3:19
4.	"Hammerzeit" (KyzrWolf Remix)	3:19
5.	"Der Furor" (KyzrWolf Remix)	4:22
6.	"Born to Be Heiled" (KyzrWolf Remix)	5:09
7.	"Holy Shiza" (KyzrWolf Remix)	4:50
8.	"Motorschwein" (KyzrWolf Remix)	4:12
9.	"I'm Movin' to Deutschland" (KyzrWolf Remix)	3:31
10.	"Ironstar Outlaws" (KyzrWolf Remix)	1:52
11.	"Hanzel und Gretyl für immer" (KyzrWolf Remix)	6:19
Total length:		46:58

== Personnel ==
- Kaizer von Loopy (KyzrWolf) – vocals, guitar, programming, remixes
- Vas Kallas – lead vocals, bass

== Reception ==
The album was received positively by reviewers for its more dance-like and electronic remixes.
