= Scar Sighted =

Studio album by Leviathan
- Released: March 3, 2015
- Recorded: 2014
- Genre: Ambient black metal; avant-garde metal
- Length: 64:19
- Label: Profound Lore
- Producer: Billy Anderson

Leviathan chronology
True Traitor, True Whore (2011)	Scar Sighted (2015)

Scar Sighted is the sixth full-length album by San Francisco-based one-man black metal band Leviathan. The album was released on March 3, 2015, through Profound Lore Records. The vinyl edition will be released through Jef Whitehead's own label, Devout Records. Three tracks were streamed online prior to the album's official release date. "All Tongues Toward" was released for streaming on January 15, "Within Thrall" on February 11, and "Gardens of Coprolite" on February 23.

== Critical reception ==
Professional ratings
Review scores
Source	Rating
About.com	4.5/5 stars
AllMusic	4/5 stars
Metal Hammer	8/10
Pitchfork	7.4/10
Ultimate Guitar	8.3/10

Scar Sighted has received favourable reviews by critics. Pitchfork's Grayson Currin gave the album 7.4/10, describing the album as "Using uproarious blitzes of black metal only as dynamic peaks or plateaus, Whitehead commandeers the rest of the 64-minute record to create a stylistic phantasmagoria. Death and doom, musique concrète and noise rock, harsh noise and industrial sounds collide, bending into each other to create lurid new shapes." About.com's Matt Hinch wrote that "Scar Sighted finds a balance, a middle ground between nihilism and perseverance", concluding that "Wrest has outdone himself with Scar Sighted and it's easily Leviathan's best work to date.".

Steel for Brains wrote in their review that "The album is a vision of the madness that at this point in Leviathan’s career feels strangely familiar and welcomed. At once vicious and unforgiving, yet engaging those dynamics in tandem with disquieting melody and brief moments of restraint, Scar Sighted is a narrative of compositional abandon, hinging on newly discovered depths of an already dark psyche and adding a brilliantly deadly piece to the already well-established hateful machinery of Leviathan’s sound."

== Track listing ==
No.	Title	Length
1.	"-"	2:18
2.	"The Smoke of Their Torment"	6:04
3.	"Dawn Vibration"	6:28
4.	"Gardens of Coprolite"	5:40
5.	"Wicked Fields of Calm"	5:46
6.	"Within Thrall"	5:38
7.	"A Veil Is Lifted"	6:18
8.	"Scar Sighted"	10:03
9.	"All Tongues Toward"	8:24
10.	"Aphōnos"	7:43

== Personnel ==
- Jef Whitehead (Wrest) – all instruments and vocals, artwork
- Billy Anderson – production, engineering, mixing
- Brad Boatright – mastering
- Stevie Floyd – layout, design
