= The Tenth Sub Level of Suicide =

Studio album by Leviathan
- Released: 29 September 2003
- Recorded: Wrest's home in USA
- Genres: Black metal, dark ambient
- Length: 71:05
- Label: Moribund Cult
- Producers: Wrest and Odin "The Old Goat"

Leviathan chronology
The Tenth Sub Level of Suicide (2003)	Crebain / Leviathan (2004)

The Tenth Sub Level of Suicide is the debut studio album by American black metal musical act Leviathan. It was recorded entirely on a Tascam four-track tape recorder in mainman Wrest's home, and was released September 29, 2003 by Seattle, Washington-based underground record label Moribund Cult.

== Concept ==
"It's about different phases/levels of contemplation towards an action. The act of self-extermination", says Wrest. "All the lyrics, for the exception of [track] two, are about suicide, in one form or another."

== Reception ==
Professional ratings
Review scores
Source	Rating
AllMusic	4/5 stars

In 2013, Decibel ranked The Tenth Sub Level of Suicide at number 38 on its list of the Top 100 Black Metal Albums of All Time.

== Track listing ==
No.	Title	Length
1.	"Introit"	1:14
2.	"Fucking Your Ghost in Chains of Ice"	5:40
3.	"Sardoniscorn"	9:54
4.	"The Bitter Emblem of Dissolve"	5:55
5.	"Scenic Solitude and Leprosy"	6:45
6.	"He Whom Shadows Move Towards"	6:38
7.	"Submersed (Instrumental)"	3:15
8.	"Mine Molten Armor"	7:03
9.	"The Idiot Sun"	9:33
10.	"At the Door to the Tenth Sub Level of Suicide"	15:02
Total length:		71:05
