= Scheissmessiah! =

2004 Hanzel und Gretyl album

Scheissmessiah

Studio album by Hanzel und Gretyl
- Released: October 12, 2004
- Recorded: Kinderland Studios, New York City; 2004
- Genre: Industrial metal
- Length: 39:59
- Label: Metropolis Records
- Producer: Hanzel und Gretyl

Hanzel und Gretyl chronology
Über alles (2003)	Scheissmessiah (2004)	2012: Zwanzig Zwölf (2008)

Scheissmessiah is the fourth full-length release by American industrial metal band Hanzel und Gretyl. It was released on October 12, 2004, via Metropolis Records. It is a concept album that parodies Handel's Messiah with a satanic metal twist.

Professional ratings
Review scores
Source	Rating
Metal.de	8/10 stars
Sea of Tranquility	2.5/5 stars

== Track listing ==
1. "Lust" – 2:12
2. "Fikk dich mit Fire" – 3:23
3. "Kaiser von Shizer" – 3:13
4. "Disko Fire Scheiss Messiah" – 4:19
5. "Blut! Sex! Fire!" – 3:22
6. "Burning Bush" – 2:54
7. "Scheissway to Hell" – 4:00
8. "And We Shall Purify" – 3:38
9. "10th Circle" – 4:06
10. "Hellalujah" – 3:00
11. "Purity" – 5:47

== Credits ==
- Kaizer von Loopy: lead guitar, lead vocals on tracks 3 and 6, programming
- Vas Kallas: lead vocals, guitar, additional programming
- Anna K: Bass
- Mixed by Arun Venkatesh, at Big Blue Meenie, Jersey City, New Jersey
- Mastered by Tom Hutten at Bionic Mastering, in Soho, New York

== Reception ==
The album received some positive reception for its heavier metal sound than the previous album, Über Alles, with Metal.de noting that "[it is] blessed with an appropriately eardrum-massaging production." There was also negative reception, with some critics dismissing the album and band as a novelty act.
