= Satanik Germanik =

2018 Hanzel und Gretyl album

Studio album by Hanzel und Gretyl
- Released: July 6, 2018
- Recorded: Kinderland Studios, New York City
- Genre: Industrial metal, extreme metal, industrial black metal
- Length: 44:47
- Label: Metropolis
- Producer: Hanzel und Gretyl

Hanzel und Gretyl chronology
Black Forest Metal (2014)	Satanik Germanik (2018)	Hexennacht (2019)

Satanik Germanik is the eighth full-length album released by American industrial metal band Hanzel und Gretyl. It was released via Metropolis Records on July 6, 2018. The album is based around forest motifs from the original Brothers Grimm fairy tales and satanic themes. It was released on the band's 25th anniversary.

== Track listing ==
All tracks are written by Hanzel und Gretyl.

No.	Title	Length
1.	"Golden Dämmerung"	3:10
2.	"We Rise As Demons"	4:48
3.	"Black Six Order"	4:28
4.	"Weisseswald"	4:11
5.	"I Am Bad Luck"	4:19
6.	"Trinken Mit Der Kaizer (Die Bierz From Hell)"	3:21
7.	"Hellfire Und Grimmstone"	4:14
8.	"Sonnenkreuz"	3:33
9.	"Unter Alles"	3:18
10.	"13 Moons"	4:42
11.	"Kinamreg Kinatas"	4:43
Total length:		44:47

== Personnel ==
- Kaizer von Loopy – vocals, guitar, programming
- Vas Kallas – lead vocals, bass

== Reception ==
Professional ratings
Review scores
Source	Rating
MetalGods.tv	8/10 stars
RockMusicRaider	6/10 stars

Satanik Germanik generally received positive reviews, with Intravenous Magazine stating that it is a "heavy, strong and captivating from start to finish the album is a standout in their back catalogue" The album was noted for its more black metal feel and less silly lyrics compared to previous works. RockMusicRaider was more negative, criticizing "the lack of attention to detail and the sometimes pretty silly presentation of lyrics and tune." French music magazine VerdamMnis praised the album's heavy sound but criticized the loss of the humor of the previous albums.
