= True Traitor, True Whore =

Studio album by Leviathan
- Released: 8 November 2011
- Genre: Black metal, dark ambient
- Length: 47:31
- Label: Profound Lore

Leviathan chronology
Massive Conspiracy Against All Life (2008)	True Traitor, True Whore (2011)	Scar Sighted (2015)

Professional ratings
Review scores
Source	Rating
Blabbermouth.net	7.5/10
Chronicles of Chaos	8.5/10
Pitchfork Media	6/10

True Traitor, True Whore is a full-length album by San Francisco-based one-man black metal band Leviathan.

Jef Whitehead, a.k.a. Wrest, was arrested on January 9, 2011, on charges of sexual assault and domestic violence. Wrest has confirmed in an interview that the events surrounding his arrest and the accuser inspired the music and theme of True Traitor, True Whore. In May 2012, Wrest was found not guilty of all charges except for one count of aggravated domestic battery.

A cassette version of True Traitor, True Whore was released on Inferna Profundus, limited to 300 copies.

== Critical reception ==
Chronicles of Chaos called the album "a personal document of rage which lives in the black metal tradition of ruminating feelings transferred into song." The Quietus called it "musically caustic and erratic."

== Track listing ==
No.	Title	Length
1.	"True Whorror"	5:38
2.	"Her Circle is the Noose"	4:20
3.	"Brought Up to This Bottom"	5:03
4.	"Contrary Pulse"	5:42
5.	"Shed this Skin"	5:43
6.	"Every Orifice Yawning Her Price"	7:07
7.	"Harlot Rises (Mesmerized Again)"	7:01
8.	"Blood Red and True"	6:57
Total length:		47:31
