= Everything Destroys You =

Deathstars album

Studio album by Deathstars
- Released: 5 May 2023
- Genre: Gothic metal, industrial metal
- Length: 40:20
- Label: Nuclear Blast

Deathstars chronology
The Perfect Cult (2014)	Everything Destroys You (2023)

Singles from Everything Destroys You
- 1. "This Is" Released: 25 January 2023; 2. "Midnight Party" Released: 28 February 2023; 3. "Angel of Fortune and Crime" Released: 28 March 2023; 4. "Everything Destroys You" Released: 11 May 2023

Everything Destroys You is the fifth studio album by the Swedish industrial metal band Deathstars. It was released on 5 May 2023 via Nuclear Blast, and the band's first album since 2014's The Perfect Cult.

== Reception ==
The album was met with moderately positive reviews, with Blabbermouth.net rating it 7/10, saying that the album "has plenty of the succinct, goth-metal anthems that Deathstars have generally excelled at." GBHBL also gave the album a 7/10 rating, saying that the tracks "are all individually capable of making you move. The gothic tones, industrial heaviness, and anthemic choruses are familiar, but very enjoyable because it’s been so long since we've had this from Deathstars."

== Track listing ==
Everything Destroys You track listing
No.	Title	Length
1.	"This Is"	3:41
2.	"Midnight Party"	3:44
3.	"Anti All"	4:05
4.	"Everything Destroys You"	3:55
5.	"Between Volumes and Voids"	3:48
6.	"An Atomic Prayer"	4:40
7.	"Blood for Miles"	4:18
8.	"The Churches of Oil"	3:46
9.	"The Infrahuman Masterpiece"	4:10
10.	"Angel of Fortune and Crime"	4:13
Total length:		40:20

== Personnel ==
- Whiplasher Bernadotte – lead vocals
- Nightmare Industries – lead guitar, keyboards
- Cat Casino – rhythm guitar
- Skinny Disco – bass, backing vocals
- Nitro – drums, programming

== Charts ==
Chart performance for Everything Destroys You
Chart (2023)	Peak position
German Albums (Offizielle Top 100)	67
Swiss Albums (Schweizer Hitparade)	49
