= Born to Be Heiled =

2012 Hanzel und Gretyl album

Studio album by Hanzel und Gretyl
- Released: November 27, 2012
- Recorded: Kinderland Studios, New York City
- Genre: Industrial metal, extreme metal
- Length: 40:25
- Label: Metropolis
- Producer: Hanzel und Gretyl

Hanzel und Gretyl chronology
2012: Zwanzig Zwölf (2008)	Born to Be Heiled (2012)	Hanzel und Gretyl für immer (2013)

Born to Be Heiled is the sixth full-length album by American industrial metal band Hanzel und Gretyl. It was released via Metropolis Records on November 27, 2012. The album was one of the debut releases for the Metropolis Metal Records, a subdivision of Metropolis Records. The album was a basis for the remix album Hanzel und Gretyl für Immer.

== Track listing ==
All tracks are written by Hanzel und Gretyl

No.	Title	Length
1.	"Hanzel und Gretyl für immer"	3:34
2.	"Unterstützung 87"	3:32
3.	"Blitzkriegerz und Hellriderz"	3:32
4.	"Hammerzeit"	3:54
5.	"Der Furor"	2:14
6.	"Born to Be Heiled"	3:16
7.	"Holy Shiza"	3:24
8.	"Motorschwein"	3:45
9.	"I'm Movin' to Deutschland"	4:23
10.	"Ironstar Outlaws"	5:35
11.	"More German than German"	3:16
Total length:		40:25

== Personnel ==
- Kaizer von Loopy – vocals, guitar, programming
- Vas Kallas – lead vocals, bass

== Reception ==
Metal.de rated the album positively, stating the album was done better than the previous once. Music Trespass stated that "The record featured an eclectic blend of death, black and doom metal, classic rock, electronic and industrial elements all tied together with the band's unmistakable ersatz German affectations." The release of the album was followed by a series of concert tours, which were also received positively.
