= Dancefloration =

Studio album by Xe-NONE
- Released: 22 March 2011
- Recorded: 2010
- Genres: Industrial metal; dance metal
- Length: 46:05
- Label: Chaotic Noiz
- Producer: Aleksey Kovyazin

Xe-NONE chronology
Dance Metal (Rave)olution (2008)	Dancefloration (2011)

Professional ratings
Review scores
Source	Rating
Headbanger.ru	8/10
HeavyMusic.ru	9.5/10
Thrash Magazine	2.5/10

Dancefloration is the second album by Russian metal band Xe-NONE. The album was released on 22 March 2011 under Chaotic Noiz.

== Track listing ==
All lyrics are written by Lexy Dance; all music is composed by Newman.

Dancefloration track listing
No.	Title	Length
1.	"Heartcore"	4:18
2.	"Summertime"	4:12
3.	"Dreamcity"	4:31
4.	"Dance Row"	4:18
5.	"Faceless"	4:03
6.	"I Seek You"	3:52
7.	"Cyber Girl"	4:23
8.	"Black Hole Time"	4:48
9.	"VHS"	5:03
10.	"Blood Fire Snow"	6:37
Total length:		46:05

== Personnel ==
- Lexy Dance – vocals
- EvilAnn – vocals
- Fucker – guitars
- Andrew Rex – bass
- Newman – synths
- Watson – programming
- Push – drums
