= The Perfect Cult =

Deathstars album

Studio album by Deathstars
- Released: 13 June 2014
- Venue: Bohus Sound Recording
- Studio: Gig Studios
- Genres: Industrial metal, gothic metal
- Length: 42:21 (standard), 54:38 (bonus)
- Label: Nuclear Blast
- Producers: Nightmare Industries, Roberto Laghi

Deathstars chronology
Night Electric Night (2009)	The Perfect Cult (2014)	Everything Destroys You (2023)

The Perfect Cult is the fourth studio album by the Swedish metal band Deathstars. It was released on 13 June 2014 via Nuclear Blast.

== Track listing ==
All lyrics are written by Whiplasher Bernadotte.

No.	Title	Length
1.	"Explode"	4:56
2.	"Fire Galore"	4:08
3.	"All the Devil's Toys"	3:59
4.	"Ghost Reviver"	3:42
5.	"The Perfect Cult"	4:02
6.	"Asphalt Wings"	4:48
7.	"Bodies"	4:37
8.	"Temple of the Insects"	3:52
9.	"Track, Crush & Prevail"	4:04
10.	"Noise Cuts"	4:13
Total length:		42:21

Bonus tracks
No.	Title	Length
11.	"All the Devil's Toys (8-Bit Version by Skinny)"	3:04
12.	"Explode (Remix by Dope Stars Inc.)"	5:31
13.	"Temple of the Insects (Remix by Hacking The Wave)"	3:42
Total length:		54:38

== Background ==
In an interview with New Noise magazine, frontman Whiplasher Bernadotte was asked what the band did differently in this album. Bernadotte responded saying that "It's different in a lot of ways, for example it's also not as outgoing as the previous ones. It's more personal this time. Private. It's not party darkness, more personal darkness. Also it's more synth oriented sound wise and has a slower pace throughout the material." and describing the music as "European audiosex". When asked about recording Bernadotte explains how some songs were "written just a few months before we entered the studio", whereas others have "been ready for several years".

== Reception ==
The album was met with generally positive reviews. PlanetMosh gave the album a full 5/5, saying that the "tracks dynamically waves from fast rock'n'roll like, to sing along anthem and marches again until the end. There is no way, it is possible to get bored through all of this". Metal-Temple gave it an 8/10 (excellent), saying that the album "does not represent anything completely new or innovative" and that the album is "an auditory representation of the yin yang symbol: the first half is lighter and frankly slightly lacklustre, with a hint of underlying darkness".

== Charts ==
Chart	Peak position
German Albums (Offizielle Top 100)	44
Swiss Albums (Schweizer Hitparade)	79

== Personnel ==
- Whiplasher Bernadotte – lead vocals
- Nightmare Industries – guitars, keyboards
- Skinny Disco – bass, backing vocals
- Vice – drums, programming

Production

- Produced by Nightmare Industries and Roberto Laghi.
- Recorded by Nightmare Industries, Roberto Laghi, Skinny Disco, Bohus Sounds Recording, Gig Studios & Black Syndicate
- Mixed by Stefan Glaumann.
- Mastered by Svante Forsbäck at Chartmakers, Helsinki, Finland
- Artwork and graphic design by Fabio Timpanaro
