= 2012: Zwanzig Zwölf =

2008 Hanzel und Gretyl album

Studio album by Hanzel und Gretyl
- Released: February 5, 2008
- Recorded: Kinderland Studios, New York City
- Genre: Industrial metal, extreme metal
- Length: 44:01
- Label: Metropolis
- Producer: Hanzel und Gretyl

Hanzel und Gretyl chronology
Scheissmessiah! (2004)	2012: Zwanzig Zwölf (2008)	Born to Be Heiled (2012)

2012: Zwanzig Zwölf is the fifth full-length album American industrial metal band Hanzel und Gretyl. It was released via Metropolis Records on February 5, 2008. The album is a concept album based on the Mayan 2012 apocalypse theory. The album's concept is based on the idea that in the year 2012, Hanzel und Gretyl will play a show at one of the ancient Mayan temples that will actually reveal itself to be a space ship. This space ship will then take HuG on a tour around the universe.

Professional ratings
Review scores
Source	Rating
Metal.de	7/10 stars

== Track listing ==
All tracks are written by Hanzel und Gretyl

No.	Title	Length
1.	"Übermensch Überfrau"	2:41
2.	"Fukken Über Death Party"	4:15
3.	"Loud und Proud"	3:32
4.	"Kaizerreich"	3:23
5.	"Deathschläger"	3:30
6.	"Number 1 in Deutschland"	3:59
7.	"Hail to the Darkside"	3:13
8.	"Bavarian Bierhaus Blood"	3:39
9.	"Das Boot"	3:59
10.	"Heil Hizzle mein Nizzle"	1:41
11.	"Lederhosen macht frei"	3:55
12.	"Sternkrieg"	3:43
13.	"Tötenhead"	2:30
Total length:		44:01

== Personnel ==
- Kaizer von Loopy – vocals, guitar, programming
- Vas Kallas – lead vocals, bass

== Reception ==
French music reviewer VerdamMnis Magazine noted that "overall, it's an excellent album, though the repeated use of certain samples across most tracks is a slight drawback."
