= Hacavitz (EP) =

EP by Hacavitz
- Released: June 16, 2004
- Recorded: 2003–2004
- Genre: Blackened death metal
- Length: 10:19
- Label: Osmose Productions
- Producer: Hacavitz

Hacavitz chronology
Hacavitz (2004)	Venganza (2005)

Hacavitz is the debut EP by Mexican extreme metal band Hacavitz. Only 833 copies were available; these include 500 in vinyl and 333 in cassette.

== Track listing ==
No.	Title	Length
1.	"Conquista"	3:24
2.	"Fervour of Dead"	3:21
3.	"Ravage"	3:34

== Personnel ==
- Antimo Buonnano - guitar, bass, vocals
- Eduardo Guevara - guitar
- Oscar Garcia - drums
