= Ausgeflippt =

1995 Hanzel und Gretyl album

Studio album by Hanzel und Gretyl
- Released: October 10, 1995
- Recorded: Kinderland Studios, New York City; 1994–1995
- Genre: Electro-industrial
- Length: 55:01
- Label: Energy Records
- Producer: Hanzel und Gretyl; Bryce Goggin

Hanzel und Gretyl chronology
| Kindermuzik (Demo) (1994) | Ausgeflippt (1995) | Transmissions from Uranus (1997) |

Ausgeflippt is Hanzel und Gretyl's debut full-length album, released on October 10, 1995, via Energy Records. It is mostly techno-industrial, unlike later releases. The album featured mostly German and English lyrics, but also featured lyrics in Romanian ("Apa Mare"), Greek ("Galaxia Malakia") and French ("L'Experience des Difficultés Technique"). It received some good reviews upon its release, and even spawned a successful single in the form of "Shine 2001", which reached number one on the Alternative Press Dance Chart.

== Track listing ==
| No. | Title | Length |
|---|---|---|
| 1. | "Star System Wolf 424" | 1:12 |
| 2. | "0 Gemini 31" | 4:02 |
| 3. | "Galaxia Malakia" | 4:25 |
| 4. | "Shine 2001" | 3:30 |
| 5. | "Stress Pill" | 3:02 |
| 6. | "Dementia Solaris" | 4:12 |
| 7. | "Meisterfrau" | 4:37 |
| 8. | "38 Lashes" | 4:51 |
| 9. | "L'Experience des Difficultés Technique" | 3:49 |
| 10. | "Watch TV Do Nothing" | 3:46 |
| 11. | "Essen Scheißen und Geld Machen" | 3:25 |
| 12. | "Apa Mare" | 2:47 |
| 13. | "Umbra Penumbra" | 11:23 |
| Total length: | | 55:01 |

== Credits ==
- Kaizer von Loopy & Vas Kallas: vocals and Instrumentals, except on "Apa Mare"
- Tilly Balamaci: vocals on "Apa Mare"
- Produced by Hanzel und Gretyl at Kinderland Studios, New York City, except for "Essen Scheißen und Geld Machen", produced by Bryce Goggin
- Mixed by Hanzel und Gretyl and Suz Dyer at RPM Studios, and Kinderland Studios, New York City
- Mastered by Greg Calbi at Masterdisk

== Reception ==
The album lead to the band being picked up to tour with Marilyn Manson in 1995 after only playing a few local shows. Lollipop Magazine gave a positive review and noted that "Hanzel Und Gretyl created a blend of edgy guitars and digital noises that seemed to have visited us from the future." Soul Killer Webzine stated that "it's got memorable songs and a few chunky industrial sections."
