= Hexennacht (album) =

2019 Hanzel und Gretyl album

Studio album by Hanzel und Gretyl
- Released: December 13, 2019
- Recorded: Kinderland Studios, New York City
- Genre: Industrial metal, extreme metal, industrial black metal
- Length: 48:37
- Label: Metropolis
- Producer: Hanzel und Gretyl

Hanzel und Gretyl chronology
Satanik Germanik (2018)	Hexennacht (2019)

Hexennacht is the ninth full-length album released by American industrial metal band Hanzel und Gretyl. It was released via Metropolis Records on December 13, 2019. The album is based on satanic and Black Forest themes, and was released on a Friday the 13th in December by coincidence. The song Eine Kleine Hexennacht Musik is a parody of the Mozart song Eine Kleine Nachtmusik.

== Track listing ==
All tracks are written by Hanzel und Gretyl.

No.	Title	Length
1.	"Hexennacht"	3:54
2.	"Draconia Teutonik"	3:37
3.	"Nüll"	4:11
4.	"Vultures ov Death"	4:40
5.	"Wolves + Witches"	3:11
6.	"Jägermond"	3:41
7.	"Der Kaiz3rn8tor"	4:22
8.	"Hellmeister"	2:57
9.	"Triple Hexxx"	3:57
10.	"Cursed Be"	4:27
11.	"O Great Hekate"	5:38
12.	"Eine Kleine Hexennacht Muzik"	4:02
Total length:		48:37

== Personnel ==
- Kaizer von Loopy – vocals, guitar, programming
- Vas Kallas – lead vocals, bass

== Reception ==
Professional ratings
Review scores
Source	Rating
Side-Line	8.5/10 stars
Cryptic Rock	4/5 stars

French magazine VerdamMnis rated the album positively, stating that "the mixture of industrial metal and black metal had never been so mastered by Hanzel und Gretyl." Side-Line.com called it better than the previous album, Satanik Germanik. CrypticRock.com and Altvenger.com also gave positive reviews.
