= Winter of Apokalypse =

American black metal band

- Origin: Portland, Oregon, U.S.
- Genres: Black metal; heavy metal
- Years active: 1997–2015
- Label: Moribund Records
- Past members: Armageddon

Winter of Apokalypse was an American black metal band from Portland, Oregon, in the mid-1990s through 2015, consisting mostly of previous members of Thy Infernal, known for their raw and grim sound. The band used satanic images in their artwork and in their stage apparel during performances. However, their extreme presentation did not stop at their sound or their appearance. Even the pseudonyms the band members adopted were extreme: the drummer is named Armageddon, the bassist is named Slut, and their guitarist chose the name Fascist.

Both their album and their EPs received positive reviews among the black metal community.

== Discography ==
=== Studio albums ===
- Solitary Winter Night (2004) - Released on Moribund Records

=== EPs ===
- Winter of the Apokalypse (2015) - Released on Plastik Musik

=== Demos ===
- Demo (1999)
- Winter of Apokalypse (2003)

== Members ==
- Hell – vocals
- Fascist – guitar
- Slut – guitar
- Alkaholik – bass guitar
- Armageddon – drums
