= Dance Metal (Rave)olution =

Studio album by Xe-NONE
- Released: 15 May 2008
- Recorded: 2007
- Genres: Trance metal; dance metal
- Length: 46:32
- Label: RefLEXYa Records
- Producer: Aleksey Kovyazin

Xe-NONE chronology
Blood Rave (EP) (2005)	Dance Metal (Rave)olution (2008)	Dancefloration (2011)

Professional ratings
Review scores
Source	Rating
Headbanger.ru	9/10
HeavyMusic.ru	9.5/10; 10/10
Industrialized Metal	100/100
ZwareMetalen.com	72/100

Dance Metal (Rave)olution is the debut album by Russian metal band Xe-NONE. The album was released on 15 May 2008 under RefLEXYa Records.

== Track listing ==
All lyrics are written by Lexy Dance; all music is composed by Newman.

Dance Metal (Rave)olution track listing
No.	Title	Length
1.	"(Rave)olution"	4:25
2.	"Angels"	4:03
3.	"Digital Fucker A.D."	4:59
4.	"Decay Dance"	5:04
5.	"Collapse"	5:51
6.	"(Play)station"	4:05
7.	"Amnesthesia"	3:49
8.	"Day of the Dead"	4:42
9.	"Slave On_Line"	4:33
10.	"Heaven Awaits"	5:01
Total length:		46:32

== Personnel ==
- Lexy Dance – vocals
- EvilAnn – vocals
- Fucker – guitars
- Andrew Rex – bass
- Newman – synths
- Watson – programming
- Push – drums
