= Black Forest Metal =

Studio album by Hanzel und Gretyl
- Released: November 11, 2014
- Recorded: Kinderland Studios, New York City
- Genres: Industrial metal, extreme metal, black metal
- Length: 41:42
- Label: Metropolis
- Producer: Hanzel und Gretyl

Hanzel und Gretyl chronology
| Hanzel und Gretyl für immer (2013) | Black Forest Metal (2014) | Satanik Germanik (2018) |

Black Forest Metal is the seventh full-length album by American industrial metal band Hanzel und Gretyl. It was released via Metropolis Records on November 11, 2014. The album was successfully funded via a PledgeMusic crowdfunding campaign on June 26, 2014. The album marks the transition point to the band's "Grimm Shiza" era, focusing more on black metal and satanic themes.

== Track listing ==
All tracks are written by Hanzel und Gretyl.

| No. | Title | Length |
|---|---|---|
| 1. | "Hoia Baciu" | 1:44 |
| 2. | "Black Forest Metal" | 4:28 |
| 3. | "Blood of My Horns" | 3:21 |
| 4. | "Hexencraft" | 4:00 |
| 5. | "More Metal than the Devil" | 3:21 |
| 6. | "Evil as Fukk" | 2:45 |
| 7. | "Burning Witches for Satan" | 4:31 |
| 8. | "Mavro Metalliko" | 3:58 |
| 9. | "Big Bad Kyzrwölf" | 3:02 |
| 10. | "Pentagram Sky" | 7:19 |
| 11. | "Grimm Ritual" | 3:13 |
| Total length: | | 41:42 |

(Note: Songs are out of order on the back sleeve of CD case, but inside the booklet they are in the proper order. Listed here is the proper order.)

== Personnel ==
- Kaizer von Loopy – vocals, guitar, programming
- Vas Kallas – lead vocals, bass

== Reception ==
Intravenous Magazine praised the production and guitar on the album, but noted the lack of electronics compared to previous albums. PlanetMosh gave the album 4 out of 5 stars, stating that it is "43 minutes of dark, intense and extreme surprises."
