= Nocturnal Fear =

American metal band

Nocturnal Fear was an American thrash metal band. They released five albums, the last three of which on Moribund Records. Hailing from Detroit, the band became known for militaristic lyrics and themes.

== Discography ==
- Sterilize and Exterminate (2002, Unholy Records)
- Fog of War (2005, Elegy Records)
- Code of Violence (2008, Moribund Records)
- Metal of Honor (2009, Moribund Records)
- Excessive Cruelty (2011, Moribund Records)
