= Minus the Herd =

Studio album by Ion Dissonance
- Released: June 5, 2007
- Studios: Planet-Z, Hadley, Massachusetts
- Genres: Mathcore, deathcore
- Length: 32:59
- Labels: Abacus, EMI
- Producers: Ion Dissonance, Zeuss

Ion Dissonance chronology
Solace (2005)	Minus the Herd (2007)	Cursed (2010)

Minus the Herd is the third studio album by the Canadian mathcore band Ion Dissonance, released on June 5, 2007 through Abacus Recordings.

== Track listing ==
No.	Title	Length
1.	"The Surge"	3:20
2.	"Through Evidence"	2:47
3.	"Kneel"	3:05
4.	"Shunned Redeemer"	3:53
5.	"You Shouldn't Be Alive"	2:17
6.	"Scorn Haven"	4:14
7.	"Of Me... Nobody Is Safe"	2:59
8.	"Untitled"	1:30
9.	"Void of Conscience"	3:39
10.	"Tarnished Trepidation"	5:15
Total length:		32:59

== Personnel ==
Ion Dissonance

- Kevin McCaughey – vocals
- Antoine Lussier – guitar
- Sebastien Chaput – guitar
- Xavier St-Laurent – bass
- Jean-François Richard – drums

Production

- Zeuss – Producer
