= Cast the First Stone (Ion Dissonance album) =

2016 studio album by Ion Dissonance

Studio album by Ion Dissonance
- Released: November 18, 2016
- Recorded: 2015–2016
- Genres: Technical deathcore, mathcore
- Length: 35:13
- Label: Good Fight

Ion Dissonance chronology
Cursed (2010)	Cast the First Stone (2016)

Professional ratings
Review scores
Source	Rating
Blabbermouth.net	8/10
Ghost Cult Magazine	7/10
Louder Sound	3.5/5 stars
Metal Injection	5.5/10

Cast the First Stone is the fifth studio album by Canadian deathcore/mathcore band Ion Dissonance, released on November 18, 2016 through Good Fight Music. It is their first album in six years, following their 2010 album Cursed. Vocalist Kevin McCaughey explained in an interview, "the first songs for Cast the First Stone started coming together around 2012 or so, it's just only around the summer months of 2015 that we actually got into the process of creating new music and taking it seriously to the point we're saying 'Let’s put out this record sooner than later'."

== Track listing ==
No.	Title	Length
1.	"Burdens"	2:07
2.	"The Truth Will Set You Free"	2:50
3.	"To Expiate"	3:05
4.	"To Lift the Dead Hand of the Past"	2:22
5.	"Untitled II"	1:44
6.	"Suffering: The Art of Letting Go"	3:10
7.	"Ill Will"	1:49
8.	"(DABDA) State of Discomposure"	8:56
9.	"Treading on Thin Ice"	2:55
10.	"Virtue"	3:02
11.	"Perpetually Doomed: The Sisyphean Task"	3:13
Total length:		35:13

== Personnel ==
- Kevin McCaughey – vocals
- Antoine Lussier – guitar
- Sebastien Chaput – guitar
- Dominic Grimard – bass
- Jean-François Richard – drums
