= Über alles (album) =

2003 Hanzel und Gretyl album

Studio album by Hanzel und Gretyl
- Released: May 20, 2003
- Recorded: Kinderland Studios, New York City; 2002–2003
- Genre: Industrial metal
- Length: 49:18
- Label: Metropolis Records
- Producer: Hanzel und Gretyl

Hanzel und Gretyl chronology
Transmissions from Uranus (1997)	Über alles (2003)	Scheissmessiah! (2004)

Über alles is the third studio album by American industrial metal band Hanzel und Gretyl, released on May 20, 2003 via Metropolis Records. The album was critically well-received and is generally regarded as the group's most prominent and identifiable work to date. The album is the first of a highly conceptualized trilogy of DIY industrial metal operas that denote a distinct change in style for the group marked by aggressive metal style guitar riffs, gritty orchestral sampling and guttural German spoken vocals.

== Track listing ==
No.	Title	Length
1.	"Overture"	2:44
2.	"Third Reich from the Sun"	3:16
3.	"Ich bin über alles"	3:06
4.	"Komm zu uns"	3:53
5.	"Mach Schnell"	3:32
6.	"SS Deathstar Supergalactik"	4:03
7.	"Let the Planets Burn"	3:24
8.	"Intermission"	1:06
9.	"11:11"	2:32
10.	"Verbotenland"	4:01
11.	"Transplutonian Annihilation"	3:39
12.	"Mein Kommandant"	5:51
13.	"Aufwiedersehen"	4:16
Total length:		49:18

== Credits ==
- Vas Kallas & Kaizer von Loopy: vocals and instrumentals
- Mixed by Bryce Goggin at Trout Studios, New York City
- Mastered by Fred Kavorkian at Absolute Audio, New York City

== Critical reception ==
Professional ratings
Review scores
Source	Rating
AllMusic	3/5 stars
Metal.de	9/10 stars

Rick Anderson of AllMusic said that in spite of the Nazi imagery, the album is a "genuinely well-thought-out fusion of techno and industrial sounds with lots of guitars and tight, crunchy beats." Rick Sanchez of IGN said the band "mastered the pounding guitar and sample sound and lifted the genre to an interesting level" and compared the tracks on the album to Motörhead, Megadeth and Rammstein among other acts. Ewan Wadharmi of Hybrid Magazine said of the album that the band "has left a trail of Kraftwerk samples, hardcore riffing and synth buzzing. The booty-shaking beats are creative, and plenty of sirens blast the compound for death-ravers to make the Great X-scape."

In a more critical review, Coreen Wolanski of Exclaim! called the band a "shtick act" and that the album had "nothing more to offer than Rammstein on a bad, bad day."
