= Ion Dissonance =

Canadian mathcore band

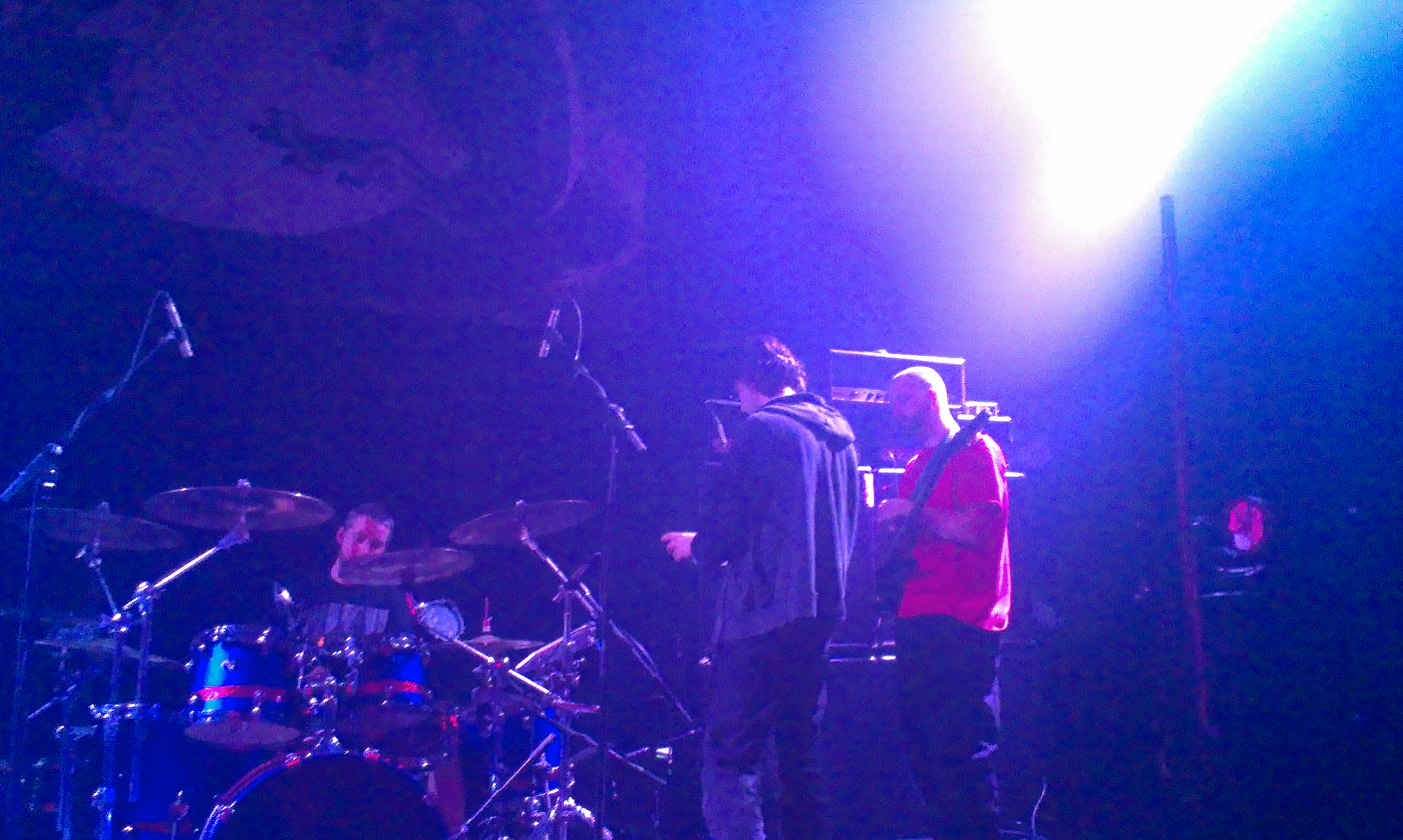
- Performing in 2015

Background information
- Origin: Montreal, Quebec, Canada
- Genres: Mathcore, deathcore, grindcore
- Years active: 2001−present
- Labels: Abacus, Willowtip, EMI, Basick, Good Fight Music
- Members: Sebastien Chaput; Antoine Lussier; Kevin McCaughey; Dominic Grimard; Jean-François Richard
- Past members: Miguel Valade; Sebastien Painchaud; Gabriel McCaughry; Xavier St-Laurent

Ion Dissonance is a Canadian mathcore band from Montreal, Quebec. They are known for their technical style, which switched to a more groove based style with the release of their 2007 album Minus the Herd.

In total, the group have released five full-length albums and are well known in the Montreal music scene.

== History ==
Antoine Lussier and Sebastien Chaput formed Ion Dissonance during the late summer of 2001 with the intention of creating a fusion of hardcore and metal that was more complex and daring than what they have done before. Jean-François Richard would join shortly after on drums. With these members, their sound started to take shape, but they still required a few more individuals to fill some parts. So in the beginning of 2002, they recruited Gabriel McCaughry (vocals) and Sebastien Painchaud (bass guitar), both of whom were part of various black metal bands around the Montréal area together.

Upon completing their first official line-up, the band released a demo CD named .357, which was quickly put together in 2002 for promotional purposes to various zines, labels and individuals around North America. This demo is now out of print but was released on mp3.com. Soon, once obtaining The Gift, they received positive reviews and reactions. In this short time, they had to pick an appropriate label to support them and release their first LP. They decided to stay with Willowtip Records (Cacophonous Records in Europe).

The line-up was changed when bassist Sebastien Painchaud was replaced by Miguel Valade. With this change, the band performed their very first show in April 2003 in Montreal opening for Every Time I Die and The Dillinger Escape Plan. That same month, the group started the recording process for their first LP, Breathing Is Irrelevant with producer Yannick St-Amand (Neuraxis, Martyr, Despised Icon, In Dying Days), the album was completed in June 2003, and saw its release in September 2003. It received many favorable reviews from a number of webzines and magazines including Metal Maniacs, Terrorizer and Unrestrained!.

In 2004, they started their first big tour including shows along US East Coast with Forever Is Forgotten, which was successful due to the positive reaction from the crowds; shows from the East to West Coast of Canada with fellow Canadians The End; this was then followed by the Maryland Deathfest. Subsequently, bassist Miguel Valade was replaced by Xavier St-Laurent.

Following the release of the group's second album, Solace, on Abacus Recordings, Ion Dissonance embarked on another tour of Canada and the United States in support of the record. On Tuesday, June 20, 2006, vocalist McCaughey announced his departure from the band, citing various ongoing problems and a lack of interest in the band’s evolving musical direction, which had increasingly been moving towards deathcore, he also stated that leaving was "probably the hardest decision I had to take in my entire life." In October 2006, Ion Dissonance announced Kevin McCaughey, formerly of Shaolin, as their new vocalist.

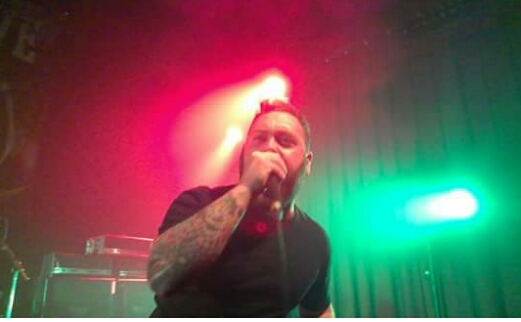
Kevin McCaughey (ID's second vocalist) joined in 2006, replacing original vocalist Gabriel McCaughry.

In April 2007, Ion Dissonance recorded their third album, Minus the Herd. There has been some controversy over this album dealing with the differences between the old and the new vocalist. The newer is generally considered to be heavier and missing some of the "chaos" from the older albums. After being in Western Europe for a tour with Through the Eyes of the Dead, they returned to Canada and the US for The Summer Slaughter Tour. In late August 2009, they announced that a new album is being written.

In 2010, Ion Dissonance released their fourth album Cursed. About the album, Antoine Lussier of Ion Dissonance explained the band's intentions for Cursed were to pick up where they left off on their 2005 career-defining album, Solace. "After [Minus the Herd] we wanted to stick to the sound that we started with and we want to finish with it," he says. "I think we really got a good picture of what our sound is supposed to be. I'm not saying it's the best sound ever, it's just the best picture of Ion Dissonance we've taken so far."

In December 2014, Ion Dissonance announced that Dominic Grimard from the band The Last Felony would be taking over bass duties for Yannick Desgroseillers due to his health issues. However, he is still involved with the band and assisted with the recording process. This news came along with a new demo called, "Ill Will", their first new song since releasing Cursed.

On November 18, 2016, Ion Dissonance released their fifth album Cast the First Stone on Good Fight Music.

== Band members ==
=== Current ===
- Antoine Lussier − guitar (2001−present)
- Sebastien Chaput − guitar (2001−present)
- Jean-François Richard − drums (2001−present)
- Kevin McCaughey − vocals (2006−present)
- Dominic Grimard - bass (2014−present)

=== Former ===
- Gabriel McCaughry − vocals (2001−2006)
- Sebastien Painchaud − bass (2001−2002)
- Miguel Valade − bass (2002−2004)
- Xavier St-Laurent − bass (2004−2007)
- Yannick Desgroseillers - bass (2007−2014)

== Discography ==
=== Studio albums ===
- Breathing Is Irrelevant (2003)
- Solace (2005)
- Minus the Herd (2007)
- Cursed (2010)
- Cast the First Stone (2016)

=== Miscellaneous ===
- .357 (2002, demo)
- Split with Despised Icon (2006, split)
