= Breathing Is Irrelevant =

Studio album by Ion Dissonance
- Released: September 2, 2003
- Recorded: April − June 2003
- Genres: Mathcore, grindcore
- Length: 32:05
- Label: Willowtip
- Producer: Yannick St-Amand

Ion Dissonance chronology
Breathing Is Irrelevant (2003)	Solace (2005)

Breathing Is Irrelevant is the debut studio album by Canadian mathcore band Ion Dissonance, released on September 2, 2003 through Willowtip Records.

The title of the track "The Death of One Man Is a Tragedy, the Death of 10,000 Is a Statistic" is a quotation commonly attributed to Joseph Stalin.

== Track listing ==
No.	Title	Length
1.	"Substantial Guilt vs. the Irony of Enjoying"	3:29
2.	"The Bud Dwyer Effect"	4:41
3.	"Failure in the Process of Identifying a Dream"	4:39
4.	"101101110110001"	2:34
5.	"Binary, Part II"	4:05
6.	"The Death of One Man Is a Tragedy, the Death of 10,000 Is a Statistic"	2:02
7.	"Oceanic Motion"	3:19
8.	"The Girl Nextdoor Is Always Screaming"	3:30
9.	"A Regular Dose of Azure"	3:46
Total length:		32:05

== Personnel ==
Ion Dissonance

- Gabriel McCaughry – vocals
- Antoine Lussier – guitar
- Sebastien Chaput – guitar
- Jean-François Richard – drums
- Miguel Valade – bass

Other staff

- Yannick St-Amand – mastering
