= Hanzel und Gretyl =

American industrial metal band

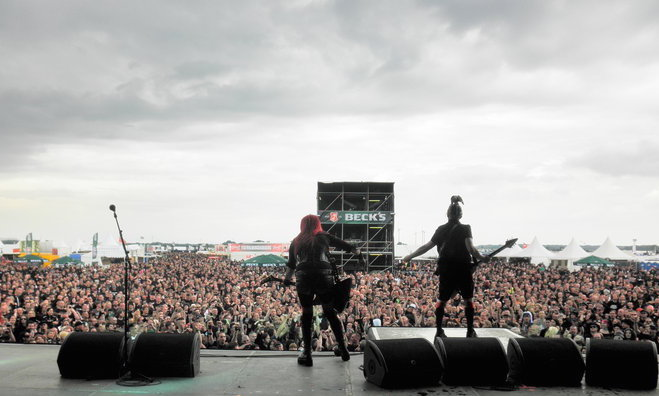
- Hanzel und Gretyl in 2010

Background information
- Also known as: "HuG"
- Origin: New York City, United States
- Genres: Industrial metal, Neue Deutsche Härte, industrial rock (early)
- Years active: 1993–present
- Labels: Energy Records, Metropolis Records
- Members: Kaizer von Loopy; Vas Kallas
- Past members: Chris Kling; Anna K Mark Baker; Joe Letz; Greta Brinkman; Jordan Marchini; Acey Slade; Jon Osterman; Fiona Doherty; Pat-5000; Louis Echeverria; Robbie Whiplash; Dmitry Pushnoy; Yannik Bockelmann
- Website: hanzelundgretyl.com

Hanzel und Gretyl are an American industrial metal band founded in New York City by Kaizer von Loopy and Vas Kallas in February 1993.

== History ==
=== Machines Good People Bad (1995–1999) ===
Hanzel und Gretyl formed in early 1993. In April 1994, they completed a demo entitled Kindermusik. Of the 200 cassette tapes manufactured, most were sent to record labels and fanzines and some were sold on consignment at a local music store called Bleeker Bob's.

In January 1995, after refusing offers from at least one major label to resubmit their demo with only English lyrics, they signed with Energy Records, an independent record label based in New York City. HuG recorded and released their first album, Ausgeflippt, in October 1995.

The single "Shine 2001" topped the Alternative Press dance chart at No. 1 shortly after its release.

Performing only several local shows on Manhattan's lower east side, they were recruited to provide support on two US tours in 1995 and 1996 with Marilyn Manson.

In 1997, they released their second full-length album, Transmissions From Uranus, that featured a video game in which the object was to transform Loopy and Vas into alien-like insectoid space creatures. The enhanced CD was again cited for its progressive-minded musical stylings and groundbreaking technological advances. This led the band to tour the US extensively with Tommy Victor's Prong, giving them even broader exposure nationally. In between shows on Prong's Cold Fusion tour, Hanzel und Gretyl headlined a Halloween show in Des Moines, Iowa with hometown band Slipknot in direct support. During the same year, Hanzel und Gretyl's song "9D Galactik Center" appeared in New Line Cinema's Mortal Kombat Annihilation and was also played at the 1997 MTV Music Awards. Furthermore, the song "Robot Logik" from the same album was used in radio commercials for the Howard Stern Show.

In 1998, clad in custom-made lederhosen, Hanzel und Gretyl toured the US in direct support of Germany's Rammstein on the band's first ever headlining tour of the states after meeting and playing with the band at a CMJ Music Marathon show in New York City. HuG also supported Rob Halford's 2wo in Los Angeles during the Rammstein tour.

In 1999, Hanzel und Gretyl completed a full-length CD entitled Oz Faktor that is currently unreleased by Energy Records. The CD depicts a displaced Hanzel und Gretyl lost in a quasi-"Wizard of Oz" type setting.

=== Fukken Über (2003–2013) ===
After a long hiatus due to the dissolving of their label, Energy Records, the band signed to Metropolis Records in 2002 and immediately began recording for their long anticipated third album, Über alles. Described by Kaizer von Loopy as a "futuristic Wagnerian rock opera" and released in 2003, it marked a distinct stylistic change for the band favoring heavy guitar riffs and Germanic themes over the more genre expanding electro-metal style for which they had become known in the 1990s.

The CD was met with a fair amount of controversy over its parodic cross-referencing of both German and American stereotypes set against a surreal and spaced-out WWII backdrop but nevertheless attained a four out of five star review in Kerrang! magazine and equally high praise from New York City's prestigious The Village Voice. Following the release of the album, the band toured the US as a headliner on their aptly named "Fukken Uber Tour" and later in direct support of The Genitorturers in the states and Canada after which they returned to the studio to record a new album.

In September 2004, the band released their fourth album, Scheissmessiah.

The album was immediately hailed as required listening for fans of industrial metal alongside Nine Inch Nails, KMFDM and Ministry by Revolver Magazine.

The band continued to grow harder and heavier touring the states in support of My Life with the Thrill Kill Kult and Ministry for a three-month stint on their "Evil Doer Tour" throughout the US and Canada.

Hanzel und Gretyl co-headlined, along with Slick Idiot, the first Gothicfest at the Odeum Expo Center in Illinois.

In 2006, the band toured North America for the release of their four-song EP Oktotenfest 2006 with label mates Bella Morte as direct support. Also in 2006, they provided direct support on Cradle of Filth's UK tour.

February 2007 saw the release of 2012: Zwanzig Zwölf. Drawing more and more from death metal and black metal sentiments, 2012 is HuG's heaviest offering thus far leading to HuG's first-ever headlining shows overseas beginning in Moscow, Russia in September 2008. In January 2009, Hanzel und Gretyl kicked off their extensive headlining "World Fukken Tour 2009" including shows throughout the US, Europe, UK, Scandinavia, Russia, Ukraine, New Zealand and Australia ending with a final show in New York City on December 19, 2009.

On August 8, 2010, with the number 87 as the numerical representation of the band and the words "More German Than German" found on their backdrop and T-shirts Hanzel und Gretyl performed to a capacity crowd on the main stage at M'era Luna Festival in Hildesheim, Germany.

Born to Be Heiled, Hanzel und Gretyl's sixth full-length CD release on November 27, 2012, was launched as a debut release for the newly formed Metropolis Metal Records, a subdivision of Metropolis Records that focusses on their more metal based electronic and industrial bands.

Beginning in June 2012, Hanzel und Gretyl followed up the completion of Born to Be Heiled with multiple extensive headlining tours including Australia, New Zealand, US, Canada, Russia, and Europe.

Hanzel und Gretyl für immer, an album composed entirely of remixes of their previous CD, Born to Be Heiled, was completed by Kaizer von Loopy in July 2013 and slated for worldwide release by Metropolis Records on October 8, 2013.

=== Grimm Shiza (2014–2017) ===
October 2014 saw the release of HuG's 7th album, Black Forest Metal and the beginning of a new era for the band. Perhaps their darkest and most metal sounding release to date, BFM employs satanic themes cross-referenced with forest motifs from the original Brothers Grimm fairy tale. U.S. and European tours followed the release.

2015 found Hanzel und Gretyl playing select dates in the US and returning in October to Europe, UK, Russia and also Greece for the first time in the band's history.

September 25, 2015, Hanzel und Gretyl appears in the DVD / Blu-ray release Rammstein in Amerika, being interviewed amongst the likes of artists Steven Tyler, Kiss, Marilyn Manson, Iggy Pop, Korn, Slash and others discussing Rammstein's first shows in America with Hanzel und Gretyl in 1997 and 1998 and eventual ascent which led to Rammstein's sold-out show at Madison Square Garden on December 11, 2010.

=== 2017–present ===
On July 26, 2017, Loopy released the solo album Reichstar under the name 'KyzrWölf', also stating a new HuG album coming in 2018. On February 24, 2018, a new album titled Satanik Germanik was available for pre-order, with another album titled Hexennacht being released in 2019.

== Members ==
- Kaizer von Loopy / KyzrWölf – guitars, programming, vocals
- Vas Kallas – vocals, bass

== Discography ==
Machines Good People Bad

- Kindermusik, (200 cassette tapes) independent release, 1994
- Ausgeflippt, Energy Records, 1995
- Transmissions from Uranus, Energy Records, 1997
- Oz Faktor, Energy Records, *unreleased* 1999

Fukken Über

- Über alles, Metropolis Records, 2003
- Scheissmessiah!, Metropolis Records, 2004
- Oktötenfest 2006 EP, Metropolis Records, 2006
- 2012: Zwanzig Zwölf, Metropolis Records, 2008
- Born to Be Heiled, Metropolis Records, 2012

Grimm Shiza

- Black Forest Metal, Metropolis Records, 2014
- Satanik Germanik, Metropolis Records, 2018
- Hexennacht, Metropolis Records, 2019

KyzrWölf

- Hanzel und Gretyl für immer, Metropolis Records, 2013
- Reichstar, Self Release, 2017

== Filmography ==
- Mortal Kombat Annihilation – New Line Cinema – soundtrack – 1997
- Rammstein in Amerika – Universal – live concert video and documentary – 2015
