= Perepiteia =

Purported energy generator

Perepiteia is claimed to be a new generator developed by the Canadian inventor Thane Heins. The device is named after the Greek word for peripety, a dramatic reversal of circumstances or turning point in a story. The device was quickly attributed the term "perpetual motion machine" by several media outlets. Due to the long history of hoaxes and failures of perpetual motion machines and the incompatibility of such a device with accepted principles of physics, Heins' claims about Perepiteia have been treated with considerable skepticism.

In 2003, Heins filed a patent application in Canada but no patent was granted. Heins also founded Potential Difference Inc, the website of which contains a series of videos of the inventor demonstrating the machine. US patent #9,230,730 issued in 2016 pertaining to another of Thane's inventions, a bi-toroidal topology transformer.

Heins has recently stated that he is unsure whether or not the machine really produces energy, but in communications with science writer David Bradley of ScienceBase, Heins made claims of up to 7000% efficiency for the bi-toroidal transformer. Heins, who reportedly works 8–12 hours a day on the Perepiteia, insists that it is viable and that "This technology should be mainstream."

== Theory ==
Mechanically, the device appears to be an induction motor with a magnetic material placed inside the rotor core. Heins believes that the device's potential may rest in its atypical manipulation of the back electromotive force (back EMF). A more detailed description of the device may be found in the patent application, minus supporting figures.

The apparent unique quality of the Perepiteia machine is that instead of maintaining a certain state of motion, it appears to generate acceleration. According to Heins, the Perepiteia produces magnetic friction which somehow gets turned into a magnetic boost. Using an electric motor, the drive shaft is attached to a steel rotor with small round magnets lining its outer edges. In this set-up of a simple generator, the rotor spins so that the magnets pass by a wire coil just in front of them, generating electrical energy.

== Operation ==
Perepiteia's process begins by overloading the generator to get a current, which typically causes the wire coil to build up a large electromagnetic field. Usually, this kind of electromagnetic field creates an effect called the back electromotive force (back EMF) due to Lenz's law. The effect should repel the spinning magnets on the rotor, and slow them down until the motor stops completely, in accordance with the law of conservation of energy. However, instead of stopping, the rotor accelerates (i.e., the magnetic friction did not repel the magnets and wire coil). Heins states that the steel rotor and driveshaft conducted the magnetic resistance away from the coil and back into the electric motor. In effect, the back EMF was boosting the magnetic fields used by the motor to generate electrical energy and cause acceleration. The faster the motor accelerated, the stronger the electromagnetic field it would create on the wire coil, which in turn would make the motor go even faster. Heins seemed to have created a positive feedback loop. To confirm the theory, Heins replaced part of the driveshaft with plastic pipe that wouldn't conduct the magnetic field. There was no acceleration.

== Scientific examination ==
In early 2008, Heins was given access to equipment to demonstrate it by professor Riadh Habash of the University of Ottawa, who says of it, "It accelerates, but when it comes to an explanation, there is no backing theory for it. That's why we're consulting MIT. But at this time we can't support any claim."

After examining the machine and witnessing a demonstration, Massachusetts Institute of Technology (MIT) professor Markus Zahn admitted that he could not fully explain its operation. Although he refused to call it perpetual motion, he stated that it might be an extremely efficient motor. Regarding the device, Zahn stated that "It's an unusual phenomena [sic] I wouldn't have predicted in advance. But I saw it. It's real. Now I'm just trying to figure it out...To my mind this is unexpected and new, and it's worth exploring all the possible advantages once you're convinced it's a real effect." However, even if Perepiteia does not produce perpetual motion, Zahn still believes that the device could have considerable practical applications, noting that "There are an infinite number of induction machines in people's homes and everywhere around the world. If you could make them more efficient, cumulatively, it could make a big difference."

However, Zahn later stated in an interview that "I can't understand how [Heins] can even breathe the words 'perpetual motion.' He plugs it into the wall." In a subsequent e-mail to Heins, Zahn wrote that: "Any talk of perpetual motion, over unity efficiency, etc. discredits you, now me, and your ideas." Zahn further stated that he would not endorse Heins' device until "the foolishness is stopped of hinting that your motor violates fundamental laws of physics."

== Criticism ==
Critics of the system have pointed out that the system described by Heins simply demonstrates a change in the motor's hysteresis drag, increasing the speed of the rotor but not producing any energy. In other words, when the rotor exhibits acceleration following a specific electrical short-out, the device is merely more efficiently converting the input electricity to mechanical energy than in the other test configurations.

On February 29, 2008, six members of Ottawa Skeptics met at the Colonel By building at the University of Ottawa to witness a demonstration of Perepiteia. Heins, who conducted the demonstration, later met with the members to discuss his device and answer questions. In a subsequent report released in May, Ottawa Skeptics expressed severe doubts about Heins' claims regarding Perepiteia. They noted that Perepiteia produces either observed acceleration or a slight increase in generator electrical output, but this alone does not automatically mean that "free energy" or perpetual motion is being produced, or that there is a "real and measurable effect." While acknowledging that the speed-up behaviour of the generator cannot be fully explained, they stated that there is no evidence that Perepiteia "represents any challenge to currently known laws of physics."

On May 21, 2009, a skeptic writing under the name Natan Weissman wrote an explanation of Perepiteia in relation to its motor, a Ryobi bench grinder. The author states that the acceleration behavior of the machine is due to the consumption of torque from the induction motor, rather than any unconventional manipulation of Electromagnetic fields or Counter-electromotive force.

On June 3, 2013, posting in response to questions Pure Energy Blog, Heins provided an explanation of his claims, stating that: "A generator that requires a 1 Watt increase in mechanical drive shaft power to deliver 1 Watt of electrical power to a load would be 100% efficient. A generator that delivers 0.95 Watts with a 1 Watt increase in mechanical drive shaft power from no-load to on-load would be 95% efficient."
