= Termination Bliss =

Studio album by Deathstars
- Released: 27 January 2006
- Genre: Industrial metal, gothic metal
- Length: 44:02
- Label: Nuclear Blast
- Producer: Nightmare Industries

Deathstars chronology
| Synthetic Generation (2003) | Termination Bliss (2006) | Night Electric Night (2009) |

Termination Bliss is the second album by the Swedish metal band Deathstars. It was released in 2006 on Nuclear Blast records.

The album was rated a 5 out of 10 by Metal Temple Magazine.

== Track listing ==
All lyrics are written by Whiplasher Bernadotte.

| No. | Title | Music | Length |
|---|---|---|---|
| 1. | "Tongues" | Nightmare Industries | 3:45 |
| 2. | "Blitzkrieg" | Nightmare Industries | 4:04 |
| 3. | "Motherzone" | Nightmare Industries | 4:06 |
| 4. | "Cyanide" | Nightmare Industries, Mäbe | 3:55 |
| 5. | "Greatest Fight on Earth" | Nightmare Industries | 3:53 |
| 6. | "Play God" | Nightmare Industries | 4:09 |
| 7. | "Trinity Fields" | Nightmare Industries | 4:22 |
| 8. | "The Last Ammunition" | Nightmare Industries | 4:07 |
| 9. | "Virtue to Vice" | Nightmare Industries | 3:42 |
| 10. | "Death in Vogue" | Nightmare Industries | 4:15 |
| 11. | "Termination Bliss" | Nightmare Industries | 3:43 |
| Total length: | | | 44:02 |

Bonus tracks
| No. | Title | Length |
|---|---|---|
| 12. | "Termination Bliss (Piano Remix)" | 3:12 |
| 13. | "Blitzkrieg (Driven On Remix)" | 5:19 |
| Total length: | | 52:32 |

Extended version bonus DVD
| No. | Title | Length |
|---|---|---|
| 1. | "Virtue to Vice" (music video) |
| 2. | "Blitzkrieg" (music video) |
| 3. | "Cyanide" (music video) |
| 4. | "Synthetic Generation" (music video) |
| 5. | "Syndrome" (music video) |
| 6. | "Making of Virtue to Vice" |
| 7. | "Making of Blitzkrieg" |
| 8. | "Making of Cyanide" |
| 9. | "Interview" |
| 10. | "Deathstars Media Player for Windows/Mac" |

== Personnel ==
- Whiplasher Bernadotte – vocals
- Nightmare Industries – guitars, keyboards, electronics
- Skinny Disco – bass
- Bone W Machine – drums

Guest performer:

- Ann Ekberg – female vocals (on "Tongues" and "Greatest Fight on Earth")

Production

- Produced by Nightmare Industries.
- Recorded by Nightmare Industries and Skinny at BlackSyndicate Studios, Stockholm
- Mixed by Stefan Glaumann at ToyTown Studios, Stockholm
- Mastered by Håkan Åkesson at Cutting Room, Stockholm
