= Xe-NONE =

Russian band

- Origin: Kirov, Russia
- Genres: Cyber metal, trance metal, dance metal
- Years active: 2004–present (on hold since 2011)
- Label: Chaotic Noiz/SOYUZ Music
- Members: Lexy Dance (male vocals); EvilAnn (female vocals); Fucker (guitars); Andrew Rex (bass); Newman (synths); Watson (programming); Push (drums)
- Past members: Schultz (bass); Max (guitars); P2D2 (drums)
- Website: xe-none.com

Xe-NONE is a Russian band from Kirov, formed in mid-2004. It began when Lexy Dance (vocals, programming) and Newman (synths, programming) worked on crossing a modern metal and electronic dance sound, referred to as "Blood Rave Cyber Metal".

== History ==
The band was formed by Lexy Dance (vocals, programming) and Newman (synths, programming) in the summer of 2004. Their first line-up was completed with the addition of EvilAnn (female vocals), Schultz (bass), Max (guitar), and P2D2 (drums). At the same time they chose the name Xe-NONE, which fully marked the style and vision of the future project: Xenos (alien, Greek.) + NONE (nothing, English.)

On October 1, 2004, they released their debut EP, called Digital Fucker. Thanks to the popularity and tangible support of the local press, the EP began to sell well in local rock stores. In May 2005, P2D2 was replaced as the band’s drummer by Watson. In early August 2005, Xe-NONE began working on their second EP, which was completed in October 2005. Immediately after the release of Blood Rave, followed a series of trips outside of his native city. The song "Stars" was included in the collection. Legacy of Metal Part 1, which was released in late 2005, at the St. Petersburg label Резонанс Music Resonance Music.

In May 2006, they began recording their debut full-length album. Max left the band, and was replaced by Fucker, who had previously been in the band Mystery (now HMR). In October 2006 Schultz left the band, and was replaced by Andrew Rex, formerly of the band Adeks. In 2007, they released the "Angels" Demo. At the end of November 2007, Xe-NONE completed their work on their first video for the song "Angels".

On May 15, 2008, their debut full-length album Dance Metal [Rave]olution was released on their own label group RefLEXYa Records. In July 2008, Watson decided to leave the band. He was replaced by Push, with whom the band played the album presentation in Moscow. In late August 2008, due to a serious injury, Push was temporarily forced to leave the group and Watson temporarily replaced him. Following the November concert in Moscow club "Relax", Andrew Rex left the band and in December 2008, Push returned to the band.

On August 15, 2009, their mini-album Dance Inferno Resurrection was released, containing seven covers of classic 90s hits. In 2010, Xe-NONE released the four-track single "Cyber Girl". On March 22, 2011, their second album Dancefloration was released. There has been no known activity from the band since then.

== Discography ==
=== Albums ===
- Dance Metal (Rave)olution (2008)
- Dancefloration (2011)

=== Extended plays ===
- Blood Rave (2005)
- Dance Inferno Resurrection (2009)

=== Singles ===
- Digital fucker (2004)
- Angels Demo (2007)
- Cyber Girl (2010)

== Band members ==
- Lexy Dance - male vocals
- EvilAnn - female vocals
- Fucker - guitars
- Andrew Rex – bass
- Newman – synths
- Watson – programming
- Push - drums
