= Anagnorisis (band) =

American black metal band

- Origin: Louisville, Kentucky, United States
- Genre: Black metal
- Years active: 2003–2017, 2024–present
- Members: Zachary Kerr; Zak Denham; Josh Mumford; Cody McCoy
- Past members: Austin Lunn; Adam Pierce; Blake Talley; Chris Smith; Jake Denham; Nathan Bowling; Julian Kersey; Samuel Hartman; Will Byerly

Anagnorisis is a black metal band from Louisville, Kentucky. They have released two demos, three full-length albums, and two EPs.

== Overview ==
Anagnorisis was formed in 2003 by Austin Lunn as a solo project, adding bassist Zachary Kerr, drummer Adam Pierce, and guitarist Zak Denham before releasing the Overton Trees Sampler in 2005. The band signed to Shiven Records in 2007, whereupon they released their first full-length, Overton Trees, in November of the same year. Lunn exited the band in 2008, leaving to form Panopticon, and the band added vocalist Nathan Bowling to the line-up. After several tours in 2008 and 2009, Bowling and drummer Adam Pierce both left the band. The band also released Alpha & Omega, a three-song EP, in early 2009, with Bowling handling vocal duties.

In 2012 it was announced that the band had gained two new members: drummer Chris Smith and bassist Josh Mumford. The group released the two-song tribute EP Ghosts of Our Fathers, featuring then-bassist Zachary Kerr on vocals, along with guest vocalist Julian Kersey of the band Rose Funeral. After a brief tour with Abigail Williams the band began writing and recording Beyond All Light. The album continued the theme of being recorded by the band themselves (led by guitarist Zak Denham), with the addition of the mixing being performed by Denham on Beyond All Light. The group released the album in July 2013 to much acclaim from fans and critics alike. Music webzine Pitchfork wrote of Beyond All Light: "An album of massive builds, harsh climaxes, and ambitious track lengths..." and Stereogum editor Michael Nelson called the album "one of my very favorite black metal albums of 2013...Beyond All Light features some of the best black metal vocals I've heard in a long time."

In late 2015, the band announced they were working on the follow-up to Beyond All Light, a full-length album scheduled to be released in 2016. The album, Peripeteia, was released on October 21, 2016, on Vendetta Records, a Berlin-based label, on vinyl, tape, CD, and digital formats. In 2017, the band announced the amicable departure of longtime keyboardist Samuel Hartman, leaving the group as a four-piece with now full-time drummer Cody McCoy.

After nearly a decade of dormancy, the band announced a new record entitled Caregriever to be released on October 23, 2026. The first single released was "Nothing Left to Give," followed by the opening track on the record, "Choke," which debuted on the website Everything is Noise on September 22.

== Band name ==
The term "anagnorisis" refers to the moment in a play or other work when a character makes a critical discovery. This name was chosen by Lunn when founding the band, but the band without Lunn has stated they still apply the meaning to their current works and ideology.

== Discography ==
- Demo (2005)
- Overton Trees Sampler (2006)
- Overton Trees (2007)
- Alpha & Omega (2009)
- Ghosts of Our Fathers (2012)
- Beyond All Light (2013)
- Peripeteia (2016)
- Caregriever (2026)
