= Peripeteia (album) =

Studio album by Anagnorisis
- Released: October 21, 2016
- Genre: Black metal
- Length: 53:06
- Label: Vendetta
- Producer: Zak Denham

Anagnorisis chronology
| Beyond All Light (2013) | Peripeteia (2016) |

Peripeteia is the third full-length album by the black metal band Anagnorisis. The title refers to concept described by Aristotle, peripeteia, which is also connected to the origin of the group's name, the concept of anagnorisis. The album was recorded and produced by the band and principal guitarist, Zak Denham.

Peripeteia was released on vinyl and compact disc format through Vendetta Records, a Berlin-based record label, and on cassette tape through European and US-based tape labels.

== Track listing ==
| No. | Title | Length |
|---|---|---|
| 1. | Transparent − | 01:36 |
| 2. | Disgust & Remorse, Pt I | 05:07 |
| 3. | Disgust & Remorse, Pt II | 07:54 |
| 4. | 5306 Morningside | 05:14 |
| 5. | Night Skies over Nothingness | 09:27 |
| 6. | Peripeteia | 11:57 |
| 7. | Metamorphosis | 08:07 |
| 8. | Transparent + | 03:38 |
| Total: | | 53:06 |
