= Deathstars =

Swedish metal band

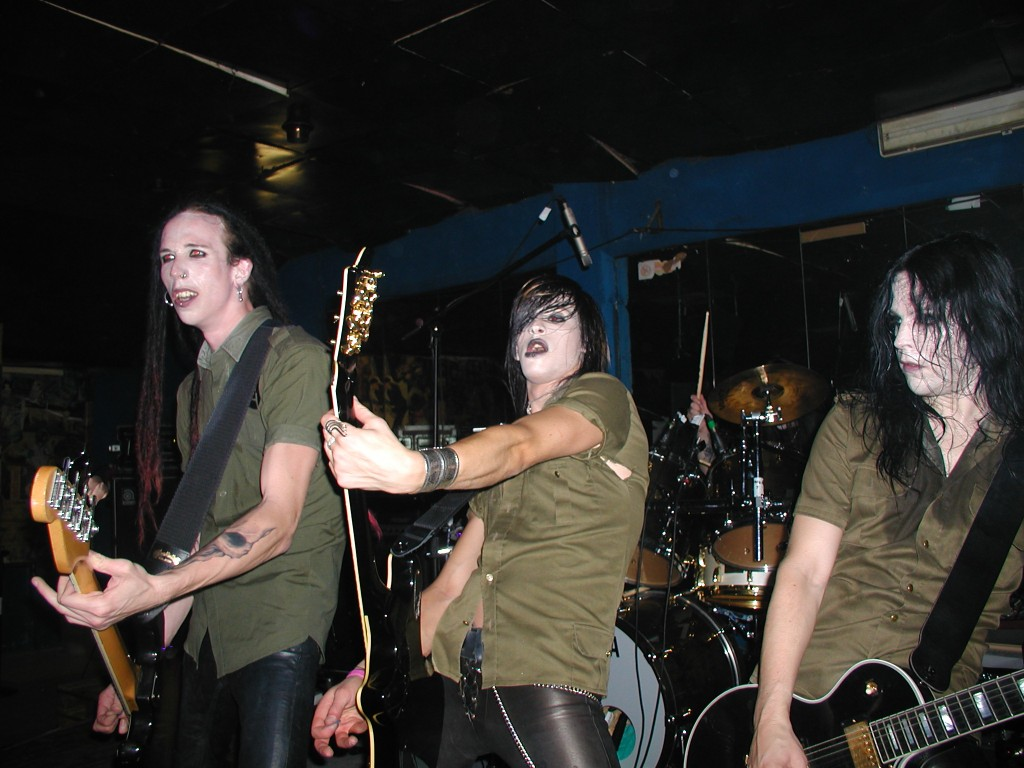
- Deathstars performing in 2006

Background information
- Origin: Strömstad, Sweden
- Genres: Industrial metal; gothic metal
- Years active: 2000–present
- Labels: Nuclear Blast; Bieler Bros.
- Members: Nightmare Industries; Whiplasher Bernadotte; Skinny Disco; Cat Casino; Nitro
- Past members: Beast X Electric; Bone W Machine; Vice
- Website: deathstars.net

Deathstars is a Swedish industrial metal band from Strömstad. Formed in 2000, the group are noted for their dark horror-themed lyrics, pessimistic and misanthropic social commentary, distinctive trademark face paint, dark stage uniforms and physical appearances that correspond to gothic fashion. They have released five full-length studio albums; Synthetic Generation (2002), Termination Bliss (2006), Night Electric Night (2009), The Perfect Cult (2014), and Everything Destroys You (2023).

The band's current lineup consists of lead guitarist Nightmare Industries, lead vocalist Whiplasher Bernadotte, bassist Skinny Disco, rhythm guitarist Cat Casino and drummer Nitro.

== History ==
=== Formation and Synthetic Generation (2000–2003) ===
The band's logo

Deathstars was formed in 2000 by childhood friends in Strömstad. The members consider Deathstars to be a metamorphosed version of the black metal act Swordmaster. Deathstars' first line-up consisted of vocalist and frontman Andreas Bergh ("Whiplasher Bernadotte"), guitarists Emil Nödtveidt ("Nightmare Industries") and saw Erik Halvorsen ("Beast X Electric"), and drummer Ole Öhman ("Bone W. Machine"). The name "Deathstars" was never intended to be a reference to the Death Star in Star Wars.

The band's debut album, Synthetic Generation, was first released in Sweden in March 2002 and released in Europe by German Nuclear Blast label the following year. In October of that same year, live bassist Jonas Kangur ("Skinny Disco") became an official member.

=== Termination Bliss, new lineup (2004–2006) ===
The band's plans to start recording their sophomore album in June 2004 were delayed as the members had over $15,000 worth of gear stolen from their tour bus while returning home from an appearance at the Wave Gotik Treffen festival in Germany. Later that year, the band opened for Dissection at their Stockholm Lilla Arenan show in late October.

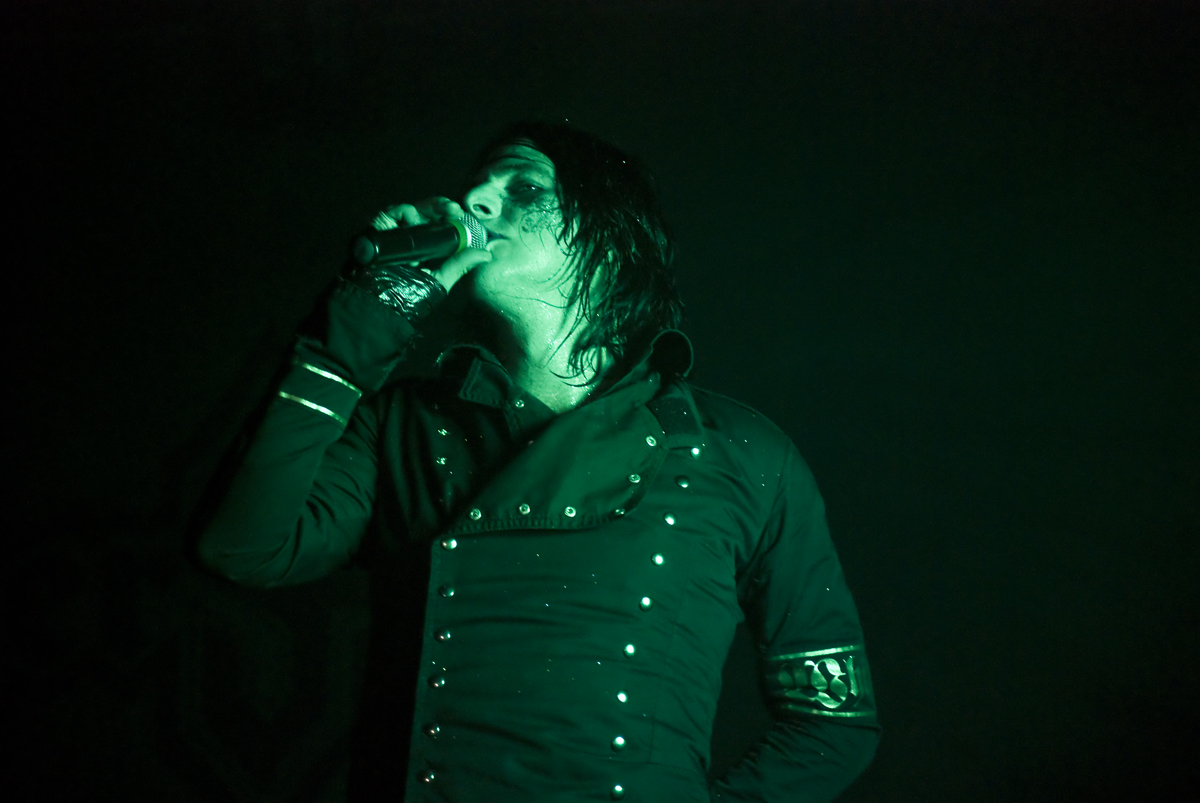
Singer Whiplasher Bernadotte live with the band in 2009

In early 2005, Deathstars started recording their new album at the band's own Black Syndicate Studios. The band parted ways with guitarist Beast X Electric in August, citing a "lack of enthusiasm". In January 2006, Deathstars released their second album, Termination Bliss. The band supported Cradle of Filth on their 2006 tour through Europe. That same year, Nightmare Industries and bassist Skinny Disco contributed to the production of the Dissection album Reinkaos. In 2006, guitarist Eric Bäckman ("Cat Casino") joined the band.

=== Night Electric Night (2007–2012) ===
In September 2007, Deathstars announced that they would support Korn for their European tour throughout January and February 2008. It was later announced that drummer Bone W. Machine would not partake in the tour for personal reasons. Singer Whiplasher Bernadotte attributed this to the fact that the drummer "had to take care of his family back home." Fellow Swede Adrian Erlandsson, formerly of At the Gates and Cradle of Filth, filled in on the drumming duties for the tour. The band headlined several shows between the dates they performed with Korn.

On 29 October 2007, Deathstars entered Metrosonic Recording Studios in New York City to begin the recording of their third studio album. The mixing was set for January 2008 with the album scheduled for release during Spring 2008. Producer and guitarist Nightmare Industries wrote the song "Via the End" for the album about the suicide of his brother, Jon Nödtveidt. Initially titled Deathglam, the album was later renamed to Night Electric Night. On 7 November 2008, Deathstars announced that their third studio album would be released on 30 January 2009, along with the track listing and the first single, "Death Dies Hard". The following day, the artwork for the standard edition cover was revealed.

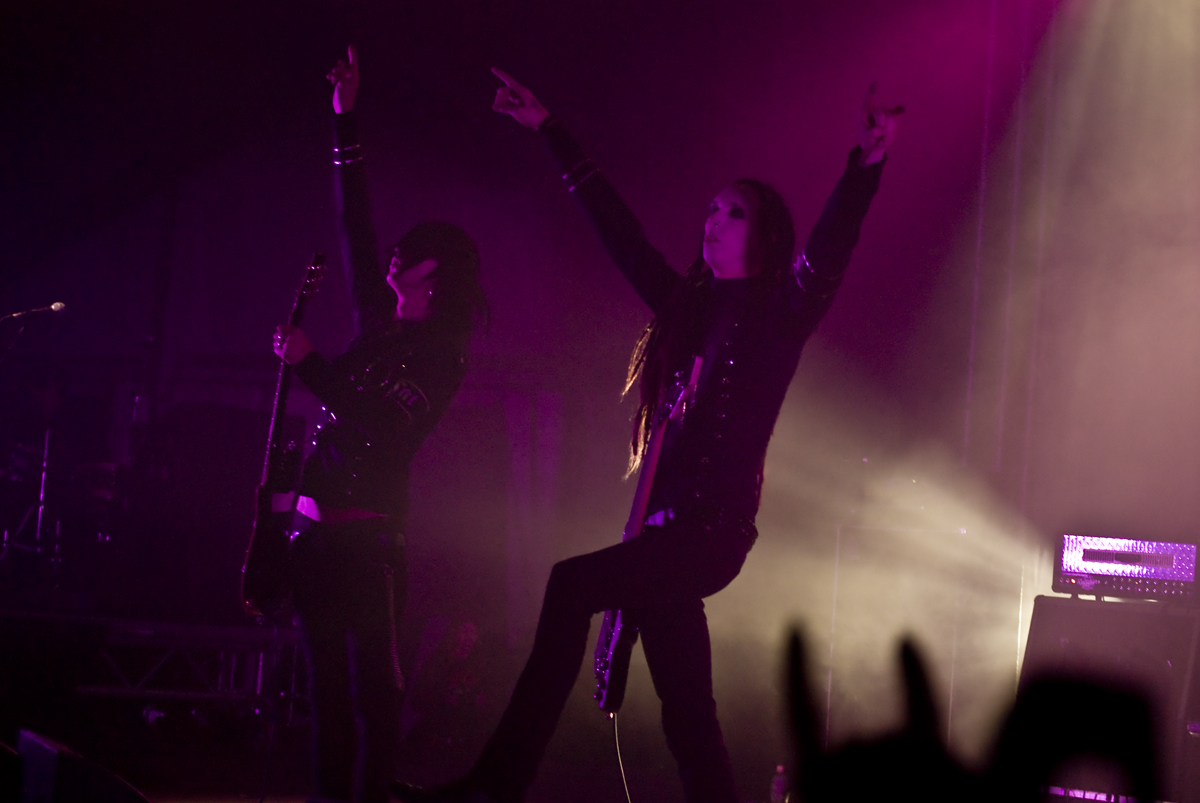
Guitarist Cat Casino and bassist Skinny Disco performing in 2009

Following the release of Night Electric Night, the band toured Europe in support of the album throughout 2009 and 2010, in addition to four shows in South America in May 2010. In early 2011, Skinny Kangur and Cat Casino toured with the American glam metal band Vain.

The band has also released two compilation albums; Decade of Debauchery and The Greatest Hits on Earth, the latter containing two new tracks, "Metal", which was accompanied by a music video, and "Death Is Wasted On The Dead".

On 25 August 2011, it was announced that Deathstars would support Rammstein on the first European leg of their Made in Germany 1995–2011 tour. In October 2011, Deathstars announced Oscar Leander ("Vice) as their new drummer following the departure of Bone W. Machine. The band returned to support Rammstein for their second European leg in early 2012.

=== The Perfect Cult and lineup change (2013–2016) ===
In April 2013, Deathstars announced on their official website that the recording of their next album would begin in July, and that guitarist Cat Casino had left the band, citing a wish to "focus on other things." The band stated that they would not look for a replacement for the guitarist and that they remain close friends. Deathstars fourth studio album was recorded in several studios around Sweden. The album was mixed and mastered by frequent Rammstein-collaborators Stefan Glaumann and Svante Forsbäck respectively. In June 2014, the album The Perfect Cult was released through Nuclear Blast.

=== Departure of Vice, reuniting with Cat Casino, and Everything Destroys You (2017–present) ===
Deathstars announced on 21 June 2017 that longtime drummer Vice would be leaving the band and joining fellow Swedish band Tribulation. In 2019, new drummer Nitro joined the band and Deathstars performed a string of festivals across the summer of that year, including Graspop Metal Meeting, Wacken Open Air, and M'era Luna Festival.

In June 2019, the band announced that Cat Casino had rejoined the band and that they had entered the studio to record their fifth album. Following several delays, the album Everything Destroys You was released on 5 May 2023, marking the band's longest gap between studio albums with it being their first new release in nine years since 2014’s The Perfect Cult.

== Band members ==
Current members

- Emil "Nightmare Industries" Nödtveidt – lead guitar, keyboards (2000–present), bass (2000–2003)
- Andreas "Whiplasher Bernadotte" Bergh – lead vocals (2000–present)
- Jonas "Skinny Disco" Kangur – bass, backing vocals (2003–present)
- Eric "Cat Casino" Bäckman – rhythm guitar (2006–2013, 2019–present)
- Marcus "Nitro" Johansson – drums (2019–present)

Former members

- Erik "Beast X Electric" Halvorsen – rhythm guitar (2000–2005)
- Ole "Bone W. Machine" Öhman – drums (2000–2011)
- Oscar "Vice" Leander – drums (2011–2017)

Timeline

== Discography ==
Studio albums

- Synthetic Generation (2002)
- Termination Bliss (2006)
- Night Electric Night (2009)
- The Perfect Cult (2014)
- Everything Destroys You (2023)

Compilation albums

- Decade of Debauchery (2010)
- The Greatest Hits on Earth (2011)

== Videography ==
- "Synthetic Generation" (2000)
- "Syndrome" (2002)
- "Cyanide" (2005)
- "Blitzkrieg" (2006)
- "Virtue to Vice" (2007)
- "Death Dies Hard" (2009)
- "Metal" (2011)
- "All the Devil's Toys" (2014)
- "This Is" (2023)
- "Midnight Party" (2023)
- "Everything Destroys You" (2023)

== Awards ==
Metal Hammer Golden Gods Awards

Year	Category	Result
2007	Best Newcomer	Won
