= Synthetic Generation =

Studio album by Deathstars
- Released: 2002/2003
- Genre: Industrial metal, gothic metal
- Length: 41:12
- Label: Nuclear Blast

Deathstars chronology
Syndrome (single) (2002)	Synthetic Generation (2002)	Termination Bliss (2006)

Synthetic Generation is the debut album of the Swedish metal band Deathstars. This was the only album to have Beast X Electric (Erik Halvorsen) on rhythm guitar.

In a 2015 interview, frontman Whiplasher Bernadotte said that album "was more of an experiment – we didn’t know where we were heading, so it just became… something".

== Track listing ==
No.	Title	Length
1.	"Semi-Automatic"	4:17
2.	"Synthetic Generation"	3:28
3.	"New Dead Nation"	3:39
4.	"Syndrome"	3:10
5.	"Modern Death"	3:57
6.	"Little Angel"	4:11
7.	"The Revolution Exodus"	4:00
8.	"Damn Me"	3:33
9.	"The Rape of Virtue"	3:54
10.	"Genocide"	3:39
11.	"No Light (to Shun)"	3:24
Total length:		41:12

Limited edition bonus tracks
No.	Title	Length
12.	"White Wedding" (Billy Idol cover)	3:32
13.	"Our God, the Drugs"	4:26
Total length:		49:10

Limited edition also includes music videos for "Synthetic Generation" and "Syndrome".

== Band personnel ==
- Whiplasher Bernadotte – lead vocals
- Nightmare Industries – lead guitar, keyboards, electronics, bass
- Beast X Electric – rhythm guitar
- Bone W. Machine – drums

Guest musician

- Johanna Beckström – female vocals

=== Production personnel ===
- Håkan Åkesson – mastering
- Thomas Ewerhard – design
- Anders Fridén – engineer
- Stefan Glaumann – mixing
