= Moribund Records =

American record label focused on heavy metal

- Founded: 1993
- Founder: Odin Thompson
- Genre: Doom metal, death metal, black metal
- Country of origin: United States
- Location: Port Orchard, Washington
- Official website: www.moribundcult.com

Moribund Records, also known as Moribund Cult or just Moribund, is an extreme metal record label based out of Port Orchard, Washington. It was founded in 1993 by Odin "The Old Goat" Thompson, the label owner and manager. Other staff include Ray Miller, Chris Polk, Anthony Lopez, and Kaitlin Cudaback.

The following bands and artists have albums released by Moribund Records: Abhor, Adversvm, Apostolum, Avsky, Ayat, Azaghal, Azrael, Bahimiron, Behexen, Bitter Peace, Bleeding Fist, Blood Cult, Blood Ritual, Blood Stained Dusk, Canis Dirus, Chasma, Crebain, Darkcell, Dodsferd, Draugar, Drawn and Quartered, Empire Auriga, Ferrett, Godless Rising, Grimbane, Hacavitz, Haeresiarchs of Dis, Hiems, Horna, Hrizg, Infernal Legion, Infernus, I Shalt Become, Live Suffer Die, Luciferian Rites, Moon, Mortualia, Morbus666, Nadiwrath, Nazxul, Necro Drunks, Necronoclast, Nocturnal Fear, Oltretomba, Pact, Profezia, Provocator, Psycho, Sargeist, Satan's Host, Toby Knapp, Thrall, Vardan, Wende, Where Evil Follows, Whore, Wind of the Black Mountains and Winter of Apokalypse.
