= Narukami (disambiguation) =

Narukami (鳴る神), also known as Raijin (雷神), and Raikou (雷公), is a god of lightning, thunder and storms in Japanese mythology and the Shinto religion.

Narukami may also refer to:

- Yu Narukami, the protagonist of Atlus's 2008 role-playing video game Persona 4
- Narukami (play), a kabuki play written by Tsuuchi Hanjuro, Yasuda Abun and Nakata Mansuke and first performed in 1742
