= Uwanari =

Kabuki play

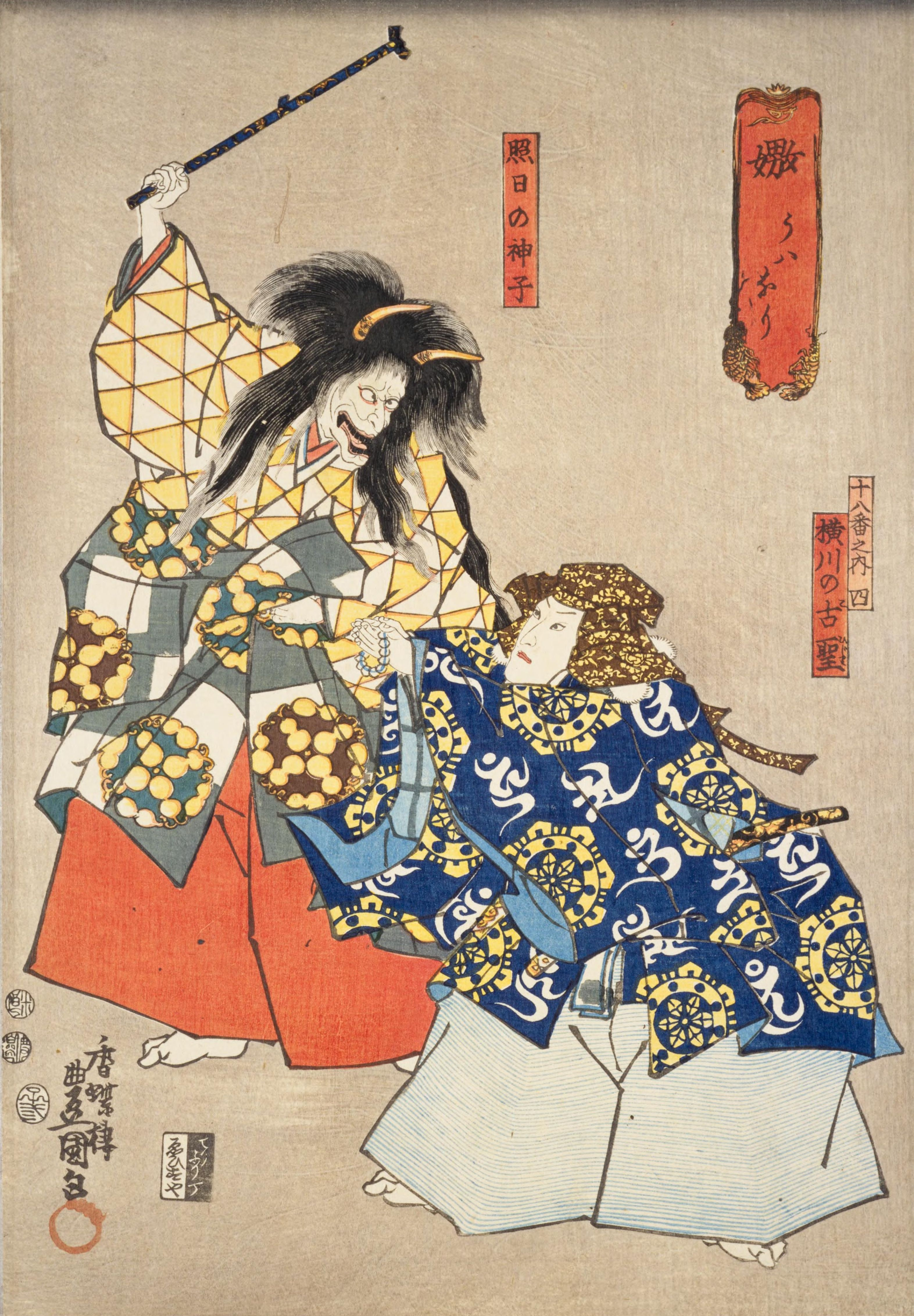

Uwanari (嫐; meaning both "second wife" and "jealousy") was a kabuki play of the Kabuki Jūhachiban, first performed in 1699. It is no longer extant.

== Uwanari-uchi ==
Uwanari-uchi (後妻打ち; "beating the second wife") was a marital custom dating back to the Heian period. As marriage was not clearly defined, no ceremony took place that marked the status of a woman as a 'wife', although men would often join the households of their wives and receive material support. This relationship did not preclude the man from visiting other women - in these instances, the first wife was referred to as konami (古波) and the second wife was the uwanari (嫐), derived from the Japanese word uwanami (上波, ripple) given the metaphorical image of the second wife disturbing the tranquility of the first relationship like a ripple. Custom therefore allowed the first wife to vent her anger on the second wife for stealing her husband's affections, usually in the form of attacking her house. Uwanari-uchi persisted until the early sixteenth century as a socially acceptable custom.

== See also ==
- Ōko Uwanari-uchi no Zu, an ukiyo-e by Utagawa Hiroshige
