= Raitarō =

God of thunder in Japanese mythology

Raitarō (雷太郎, lit. "[Eldest] Son of Thunder") is a god of thunder in Japanese mythology, said to be the son of Raijin according to mythological traditions. The tradition states that, when Raitaro was young, he was found by a farmer named Bimbo.
