= Michio Mamiya =

Japanese composer (1929–2024)

- 間宮芳生
- Born: June 29, 1929; Hokkaido, Japan
- Died: December 11, 2024 (aged 95)

Michio Mamiya (間宮 芳生, Mamiya Michio; June 29, 1929 – December 11, 2024) was a Japanese composer. He is most notable for composing the soundtrack to the 1988 film Grave of the Fireflies.

== Life ==
Born in Hokkaido on June 29, 1929, he studied at the Tokyo University of the Arts.

Mamiya died from pneumonia on December 11, 2024, at the age of 95.

== Career ==
Mamiya’s interest in Japanese folk music led him to compose several choral works incorporating traditional elements.

Mamiya composed for opera, with his opera Narukami (1974), which is based on the kabuki play of the same name, winning a grand prix at the Salzburg Opera Festival. In the original Salzburg performance, the opera was performed using bunraku style puppets manipulated by puppeteers, rather than human actors, but more recent performances have been performed in the style of more traditional operas with human casts.

Mamiya also wrote movie soundtracks, including for the 1988 Studio Ghibli movie Grave of the Fireflies.
