= Raijin =

Japanese god of lightning

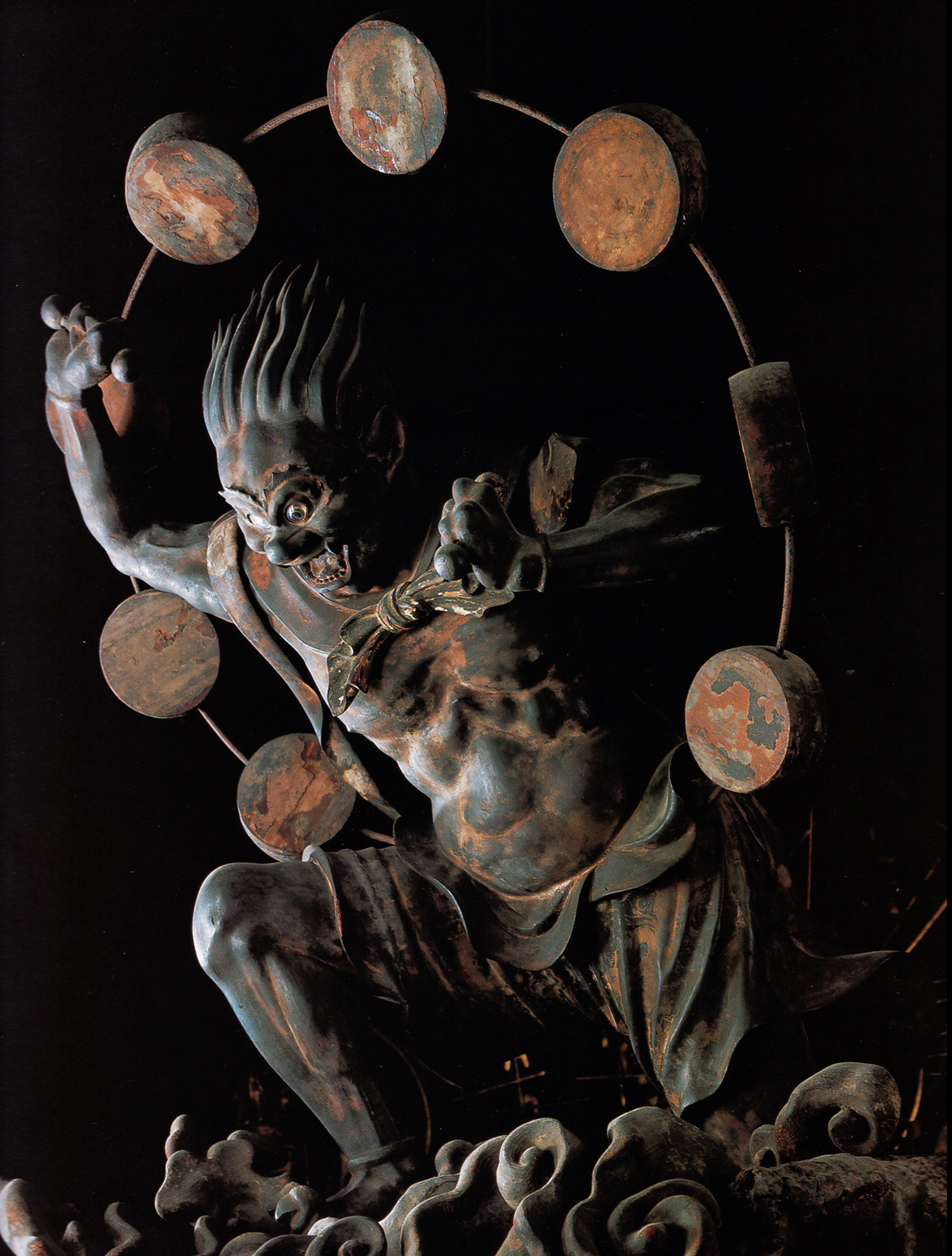
Sculpture of Raijin from Sanjūsangen-dō temple in Kyoto. Kamakura period, 13th century

Raijin (雷神; lit. "Thunder God"), also known as Kaminari-sama (雷様), Raiden-sama (雷電様), Narukami (鳴る神), Raikō (雷公), and Kamowakeikazuchi-no-kami is a thunder god in Japanese mythology and the Shinto and Buddhist religion. He is typically depicted with fierce and aggressive facial expressions, standing atop a cloud, beating on den-den daiko drums with tomoe symbols drawn on them. Iconography of Raijin are often found in Japanese temples and shrines. He is usually depicted alongside his twin-brother, Fūjin, the god of wind, or with his son, Raitarō, a fellow thunder god like himself, or with his animal companion, a Raijū. Another fellow Shinto god (Kami) of storms is their brother, Susanoo-no-Mikoto.

== Etymology ==
The name "Raijin" is derived from the Japanese words kaminari (雷; meaning "thunder"; on-reading rai) and kami (神; meaning "god"; on-reading shin or jin).

== Description ==
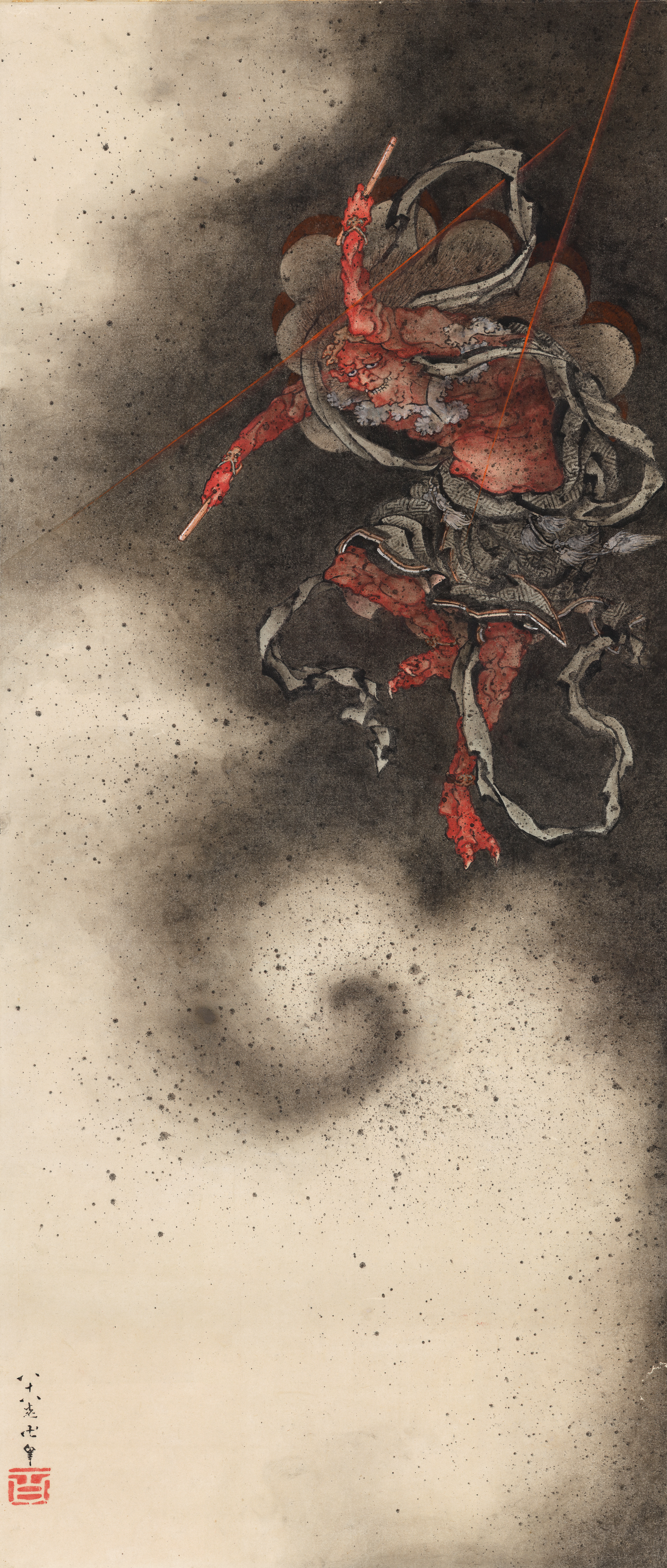
Raijin by Katsushika Hokusai Hanging scroll painting, 1834–1849

Raijin is often depicted with a fierce, frightening face and a muscular figure with gravity-defying hair. He is surrounded by Taiko drums that he plays to create the sound of thunder. Raijin holds large hammers in his hands that he uses to play the drums. In some cases, Raijin is portrayed with three fingers which are said to represent the past, present and future. Two of the most notable sculptures of Raijin are located in the Sanjusangendo temple and the Taiyuin Rinnoji temple.

Raijin and Fujin reside side by side in the Kaminarimon gate that guards the entrance to the Sanjusangendo temple. These sculptures are made of wood with lacquer, gold leaf and paint along with crystal, inlaid eyes. The Raijin and Fujin sculptures in Sanjusangendo are considered national treasures.

In the Taiyuin Rinnoji temple, Raijin and Fujin are located in the Niten-mon gate. They are made of wood with paint and are seen with their token talismans, Raijin's drums and Fujin's wind bag.

Raijin is also often seen in the company of his brother, Fujin, and his son, Raitaro. He is often seen fighting with Fujin, mending his drums, or causing mischief. He is also shown in the company of Raiju, a thunder-beast or thunder demon which also acts as his totem animal and usually a dog or wolf.

== Mythology ==
=== Birth ===
In the myths recorded in the Kojiki, after Izanami died from the wounds inflicted on her by the birthing of Hinokagutsutchi, her husband Izanagi followed her down into Yomi no Kuni, the land of darkness. When he asked her to come with him, Izanami responded that she cannot leave, because she had already eaten from the food there. As Izanagi followed her all the way to Yomi, to try to fulfill his wish that she go with him, Izanami returned to her palace to negotiate with the residing kami. Izanami was gone for several hours, which made Izanagi worried for her. Thus, after making fire on the tip of his comb, he entered the palace.

There, Izanagi found Izanami's corpse. On her body maggots gathered, and on her head arose Great Raijin (大雷神), on her chest Fire Raijin (火雷神), in her stomach Black Raijin (黒雷神), on her vagina Blossoming Raijin (咲雷神), in her left hand Young Raijin (若雷神), in her right hand Soil Raijin (土雷神), on her left leg Roaring Raijin (鳴雷神) and on her right leg Bending Raijin (伏雷神); collectively called Ho-no-Ikadzuchi-no-Kami (火雷大神).

Upon seeing Izanami's twisted body, Izanagi fled from Yomi, shaken and in terror. In shame of allowing him to see her unsightly form, Izanami sent Raijin and several female demons to chase after Izanagi, after he fled the image of her rotting form, to bring him back to Yomi.

=== Capture of Raijin ===
Another story describes Raijin as a mischief-maker, causing the destruction leading the Emperor to order Sugaru (the God Catcher) to imprison Raijin and deliver him to the Emperor in order to stop a storm. Sugaru first petitioned Raijin in the name of the emperor to give himself over willingly and cease the storm, to which Raijin laughs at Sugaru. Sugaru then prays to Kannon, Kannon ordered Raijin to let Sugaru, then she later delivered Raijin to him. Sugaru then tied him up in a sack and took him to the Emperor. Under the control of Sugaru and the emperor, Raijin was forced to stop his destruction and bring only rain and bounty to Japan.

=== Defending Japan ===
In one legend, Raijin is shown to defend Japan against the invading Mongols. In this legend, the Mongols are driven off by a vicious storm in which Raijin is in the clouds throwing lightning and arrows at the invaders.

== Genealogy ==
Detail of Raijin from Wind God and Thunder God, a folding screen by Ogata Kōrin. Edo period, circa 1700. Based on an original by Tawaraya Sōtatsu.

Raijin has many siblings, most notably, Fujin (the god of wind), Kagutsuchi (the god of fire), Susanoo (the god of the sea and storms), Tsukuyomi (god of the moon), and Amaterasu (the goddess of the sun). Raijin also has a son named Raitaro.

Family of Raijin

Izanagi	Izanami
Kagutsuchi
Raijin	Fujin
Tsukuyomi	Amaterasu	Susanoo
Raitaro

== Modern role ==
Some Japanese parents tell their children to hide their belly buttons during thunderstorms so that Raijin does not take them away and eat them.

Raijin also appears in the kabuki play Narukami, in which he is imprisoned under a pool of water, thus causing a drought.

== Gallery ==
Folding screen depicting Raijin alone, by Tawaraya Sōtatsu (1570–1640).

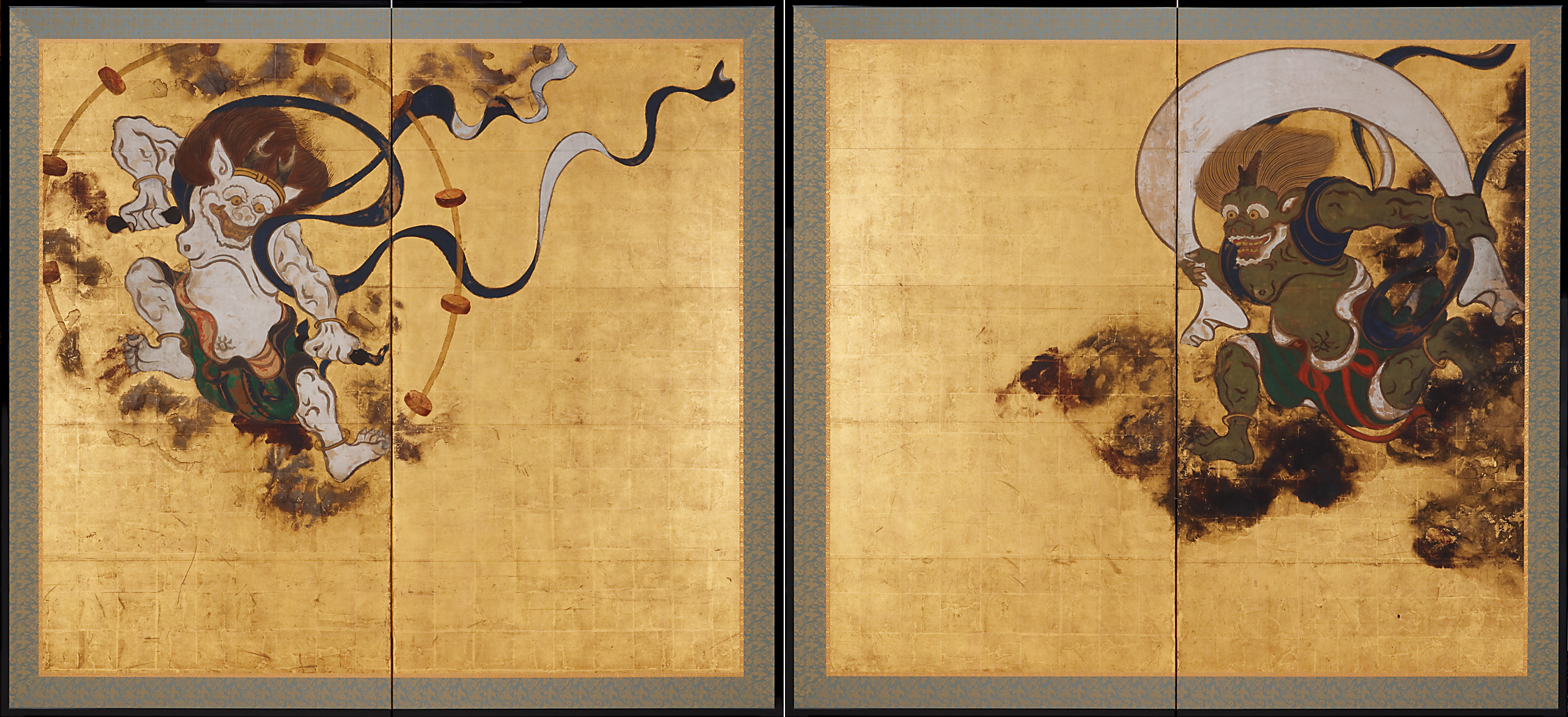
Folding screen depicting Raijin (left) and Fūjin (right), by Tawaraya Sōtatsu.

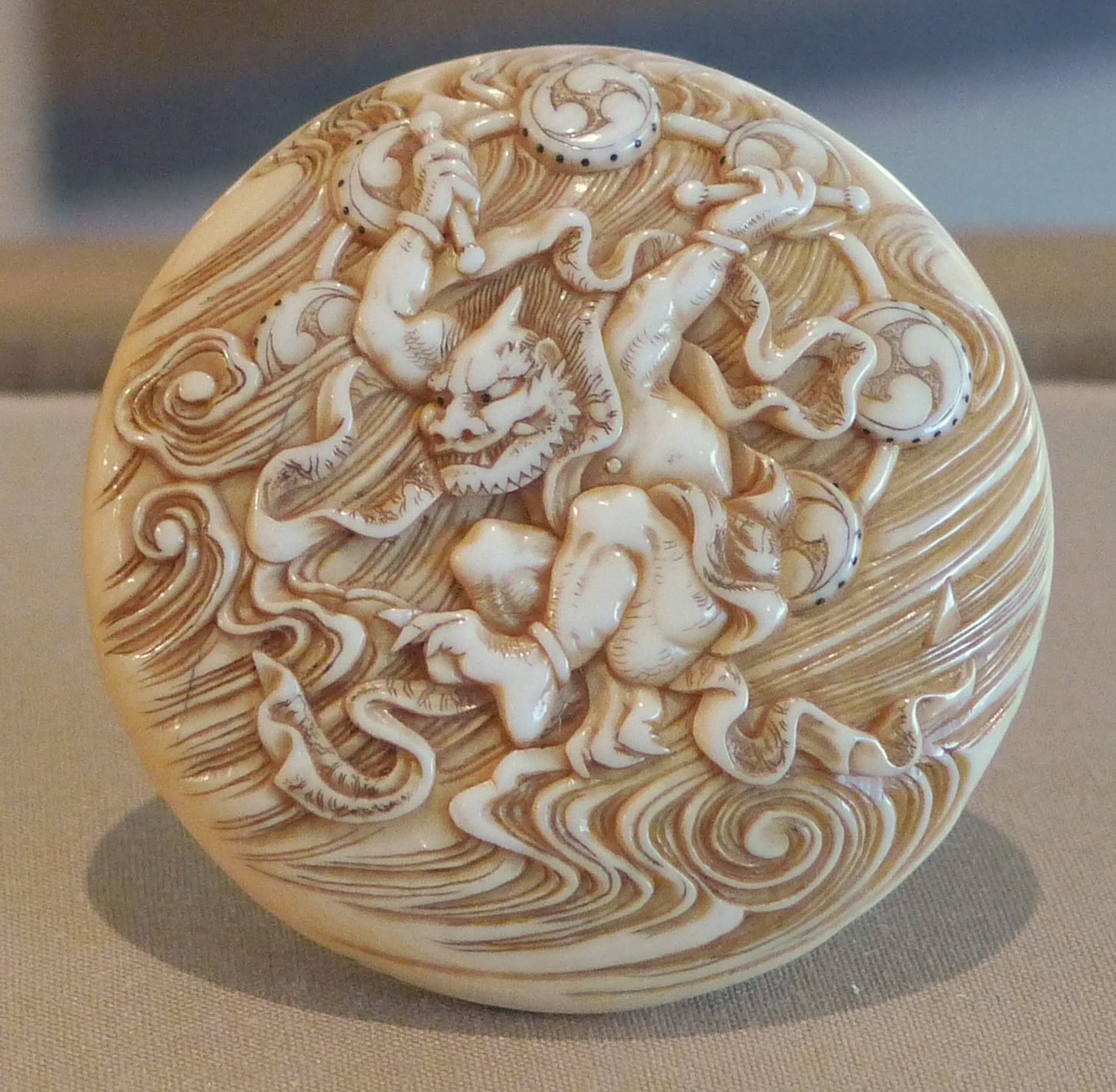
Netsuke depicting Raijin, by Kaigyokusai Masatsugu (1813–1892)

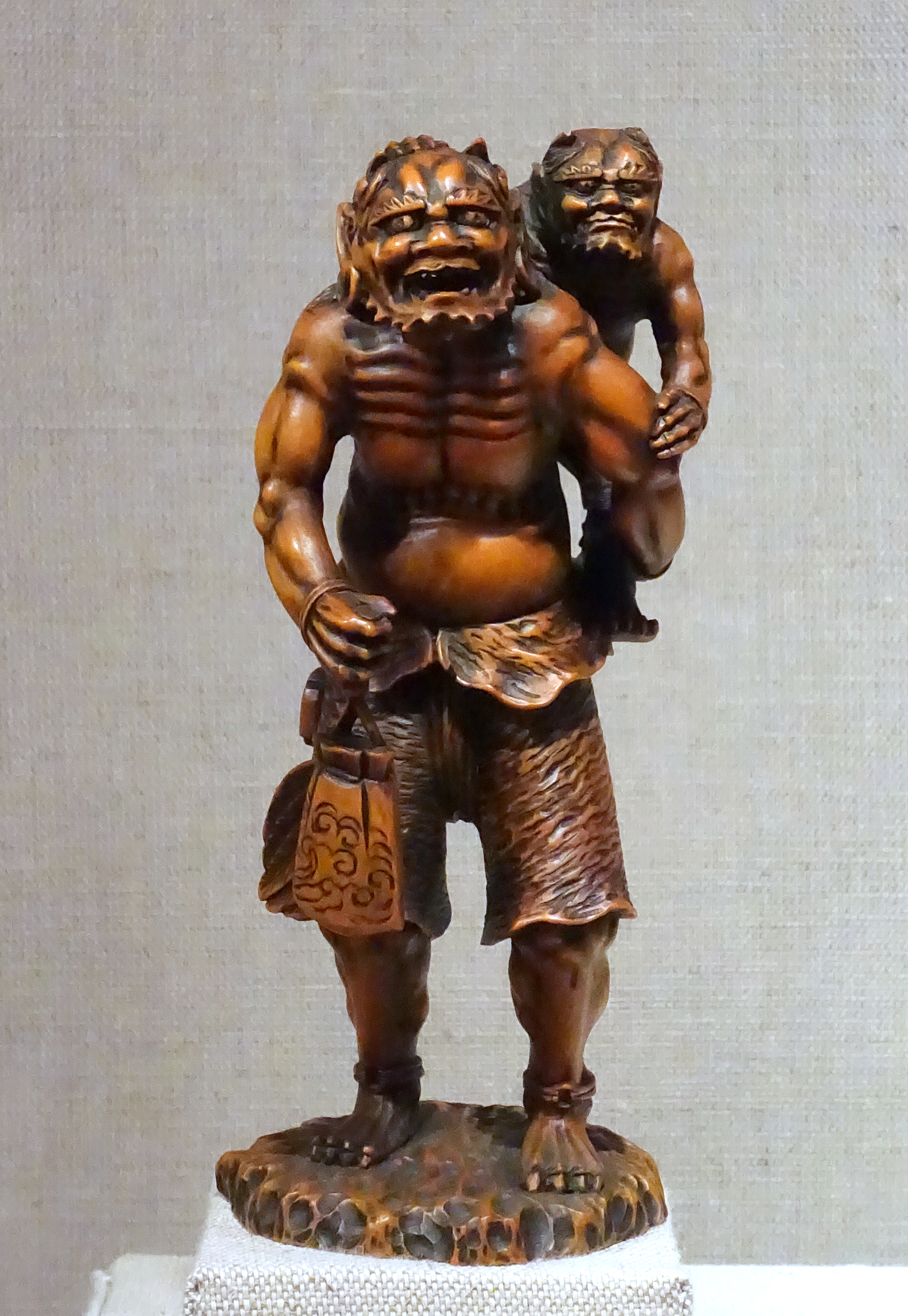
Okimono depicting Raijin and son. Meiji period, 1868–1912.

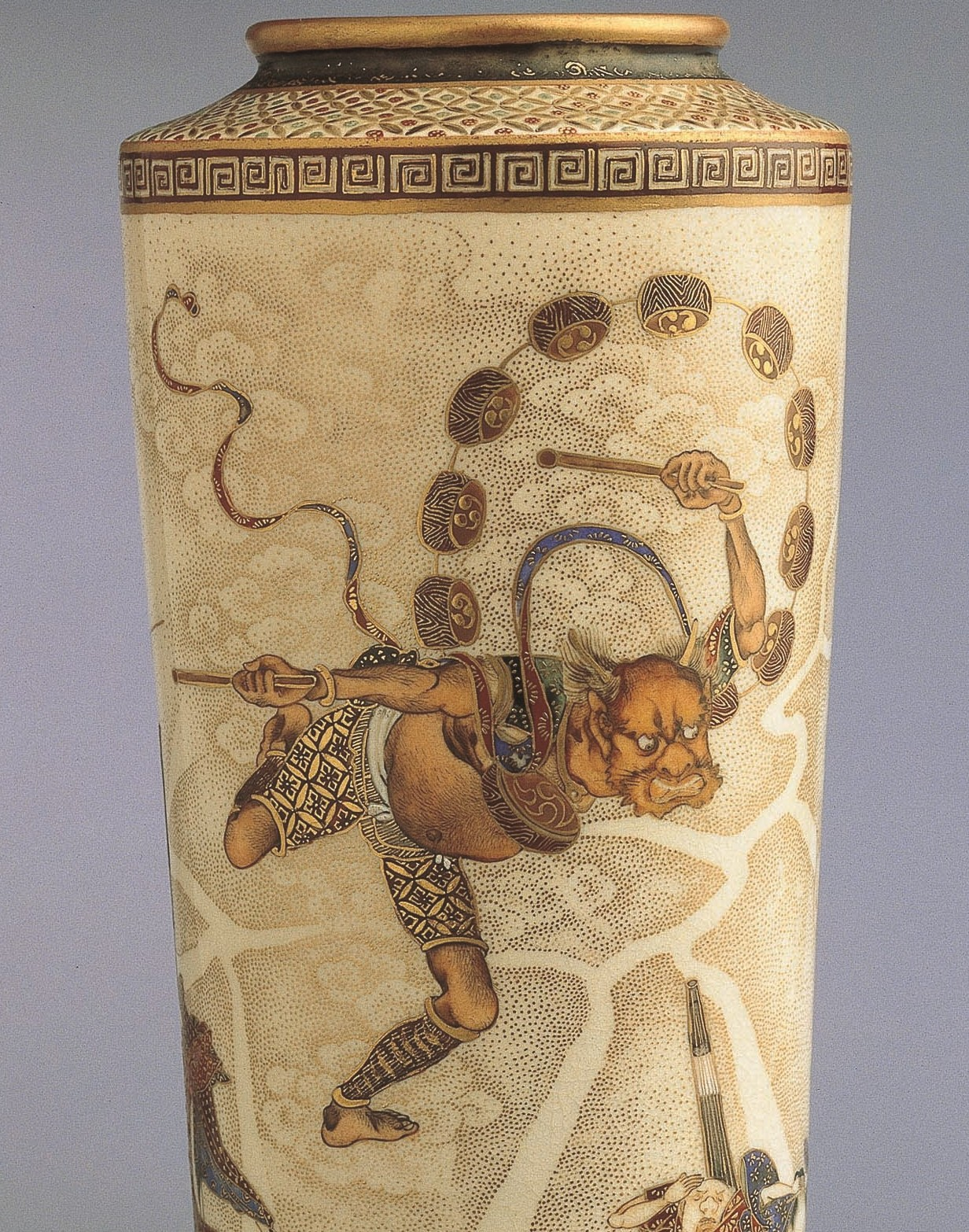
Raijin with drums on an earthenware vase. Meiji period, 19th century.

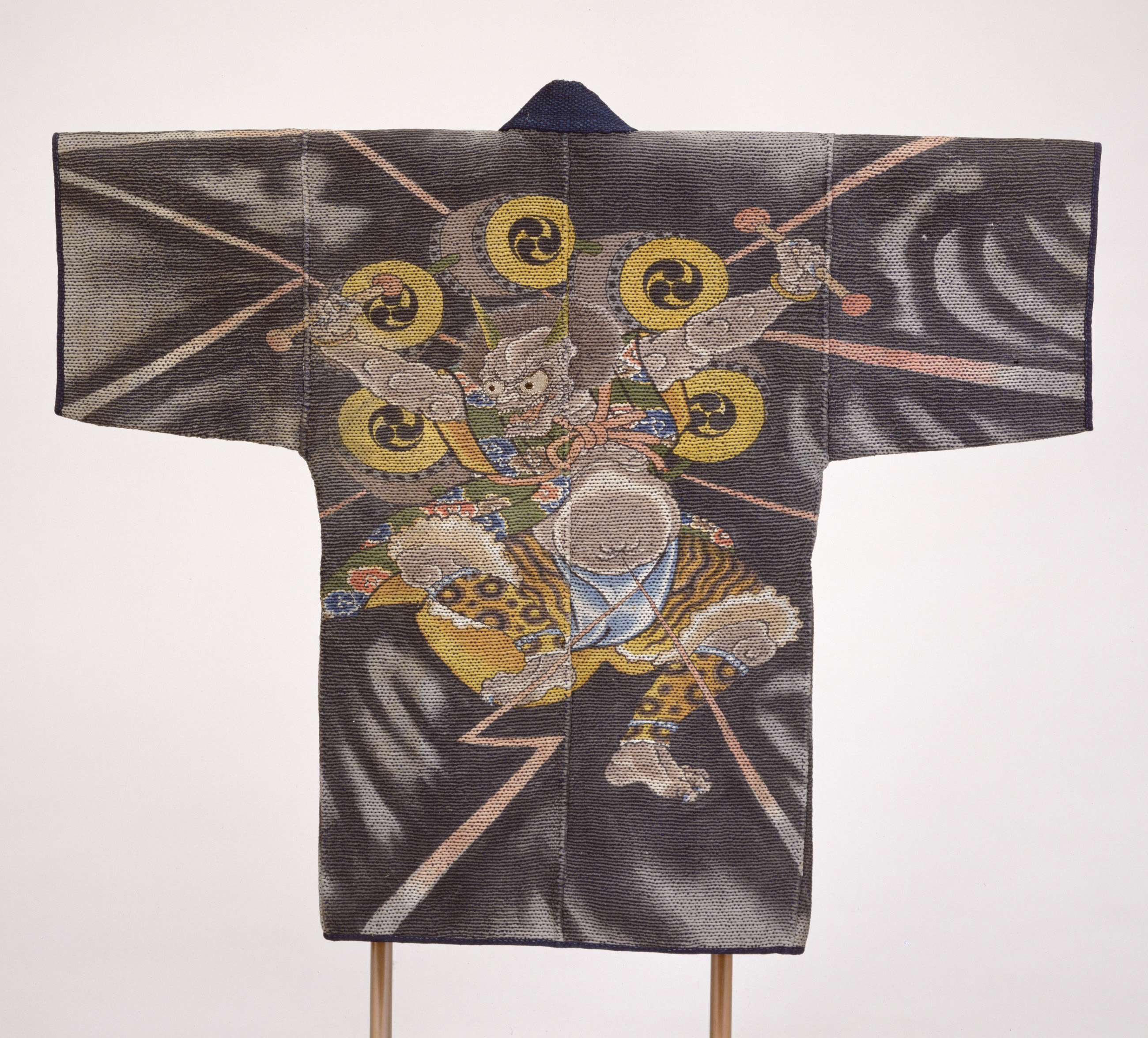
Japanese fireman's coat depicting Raijin on the back. 19th century.

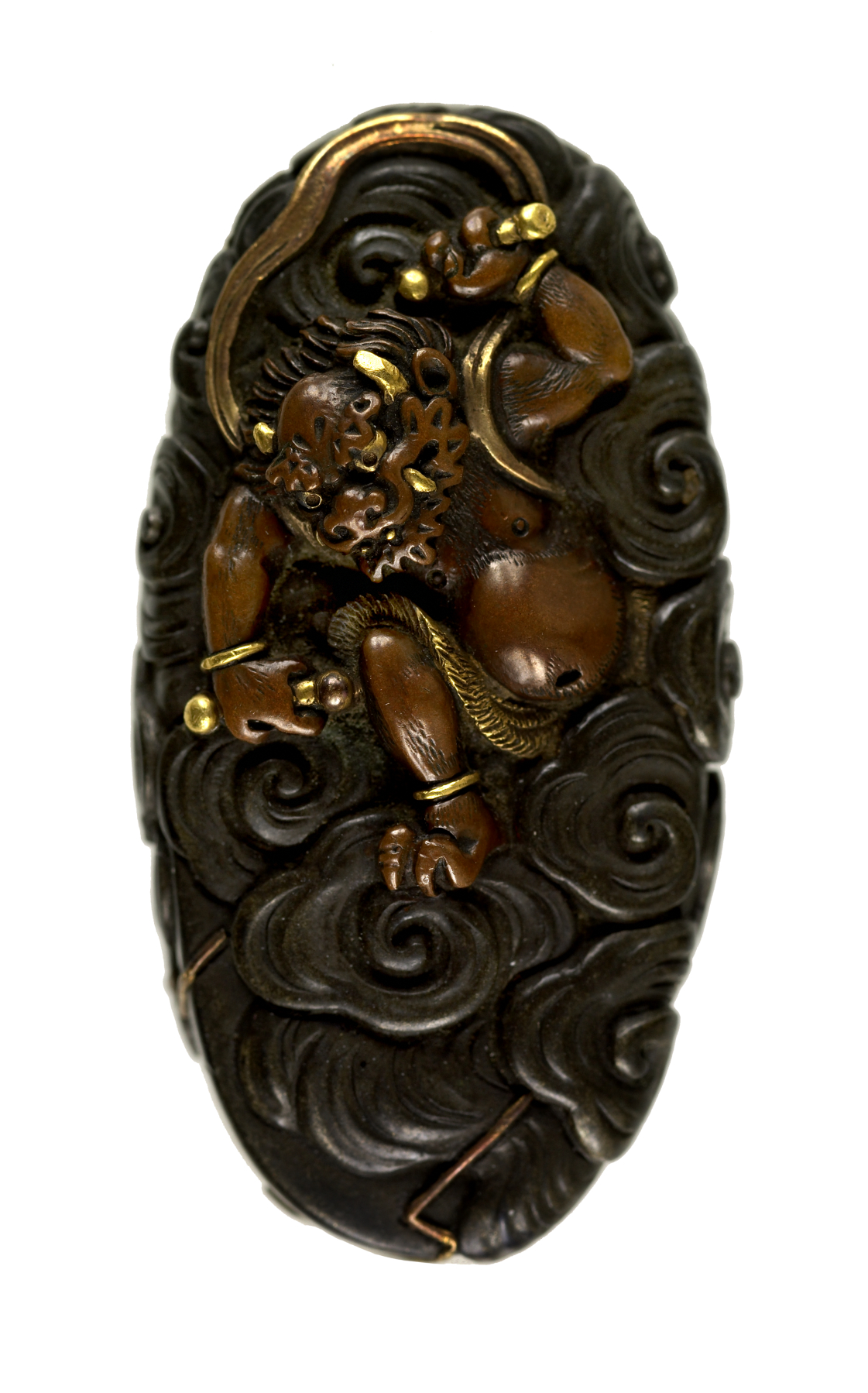
Sword pommel depicting Raijin. Edo period, 1800–1500.

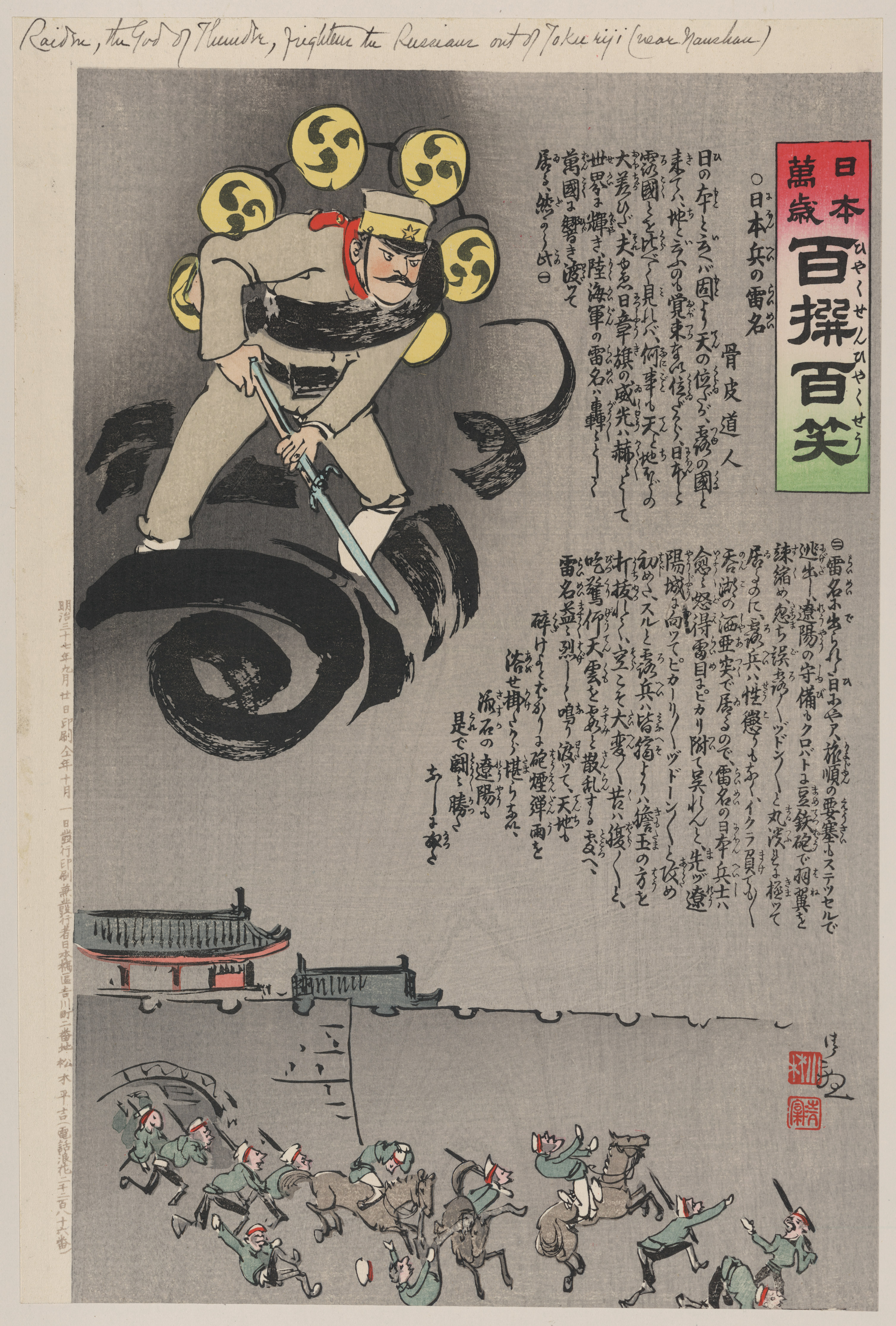
Raijin frightens the Russians out of Tokuriji, during the Battle of Nanshan. Propagandistic print by Kobayashi Kiyochika, 1904.

== See also ==
- Dian Mu (Chinese), goddess of lightning
- Izanagi (Japanese), one of the divine pair of creation deities
- Izanami (Japanese), one of the divine pair of creation deities
- Kintarō
- Lei Gong (Chinese), god of thunder
- Mitsubishi J2M Raiden—WW2 interceptor named for Raiden
- Parjanya (Hindu), god of rain, thunder and lightning
- Sanjūsangen-dō (Japanese temple)
- Tachibana Dōsetsu
