= Nanatsumen =

Nanatsumen 七つ面
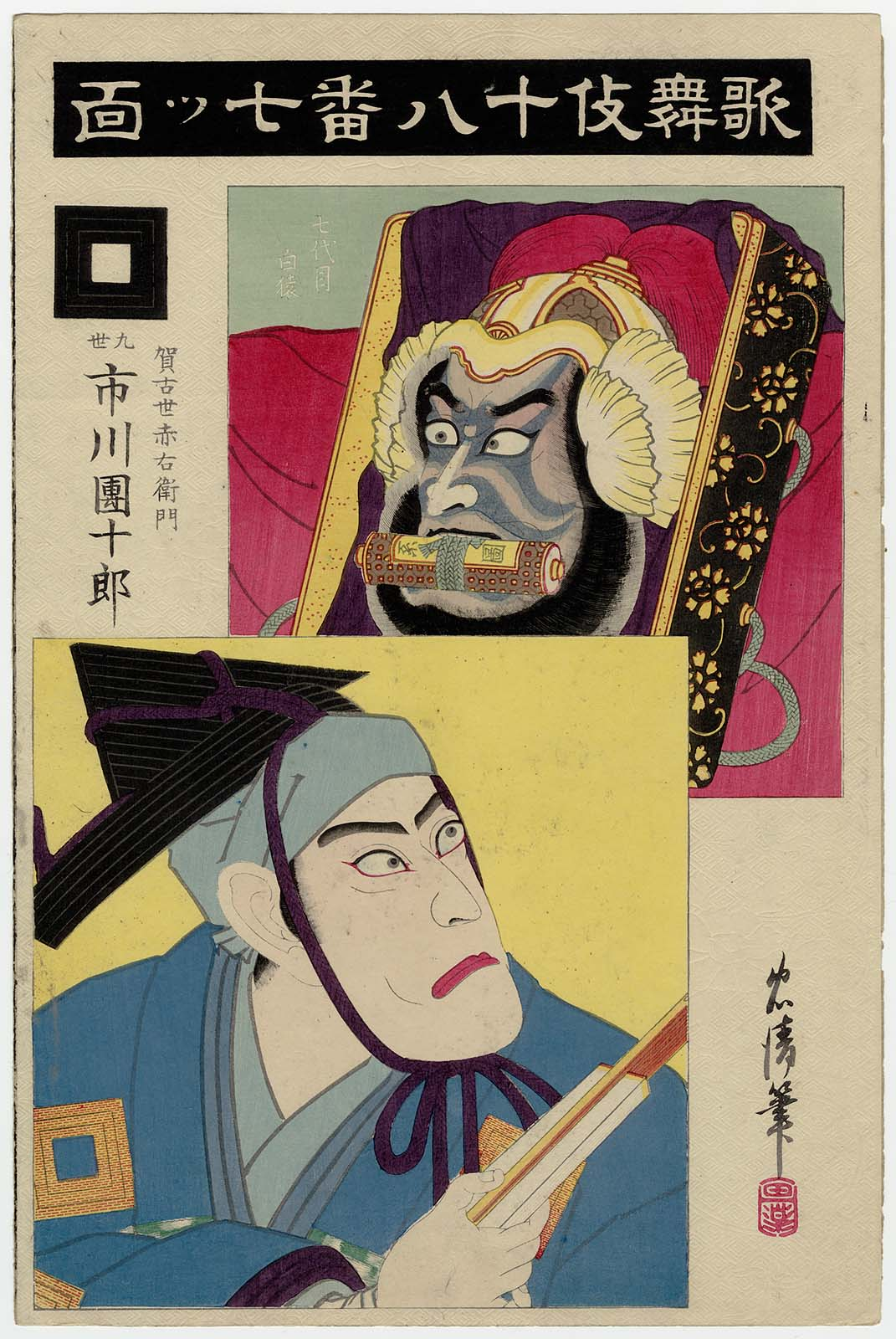
- A print of the play designed by Torii Tadakiyo and Torii Kiyosada (of the Torii school). The actor playing Kakoyo Akaemon is Ichikawa Danjūrō IX.
- Original language: Japanese
- Written by: Fujimoto Tobun

Premiere
- Date: 1740
- Place: Japan

Nanatsumen (七つ面) is a play in the Kabuki repertoire, and one of the celebrated Kabuki Jūhachiban ("Eighteen Great Plays"). The play is known in English as The Seven Masks.
