= Kabuki Jūhachiban =

Set of 18 Kabuki plays

The Kabuki Jūhachiban (歌舞伎十八番), or Eighteen Best Kabuki Plays, is a set of kabuki plays, strongly associated with the Ichikawa Danjūrō line of actors ever since their premieres. These works were chosen and assembled as "the eighteen" by actor Ichikawa Danjūrō VII (1800-1832). The pieces were considered to be seminal representations of the aragoto style in the repertoire. The Danjūrō line has continued to dominate the leading roles, and the printing and production of these plays ever since.

Shibaraku, Narukami, Sukeroku, Ya-no-Ne, and Kanjinchō are still considered among the greatest of all kabuki plays, and are performed at least once a year. These plays are also often performed for shūmei, auspicious naming ceremonies in which actors who receive new names, particularly those receiving the illustrious name "Ichikawa Danjūrō", perform in these great plays which are strongly associated with that lineage.

While the plays contained within the Kabuki Jūhachiban do number 18, the number, along with other eight-related numbers such as 80 and 88, is symbolic of the general concept of "a great many."

A Shin-Kabuki Jūhachiban (New Eighteen Best Kabuki Plays) was assembled by Ichikawa Danjūrō IX in the Meiji period, representing his favorites, many of which are particularly representative of Meiji period kabuki.

Of the original eighteen, only ten or eleven are considered to still be actively performed, though some are performed far less frequently than others.

== The Eighteen ==
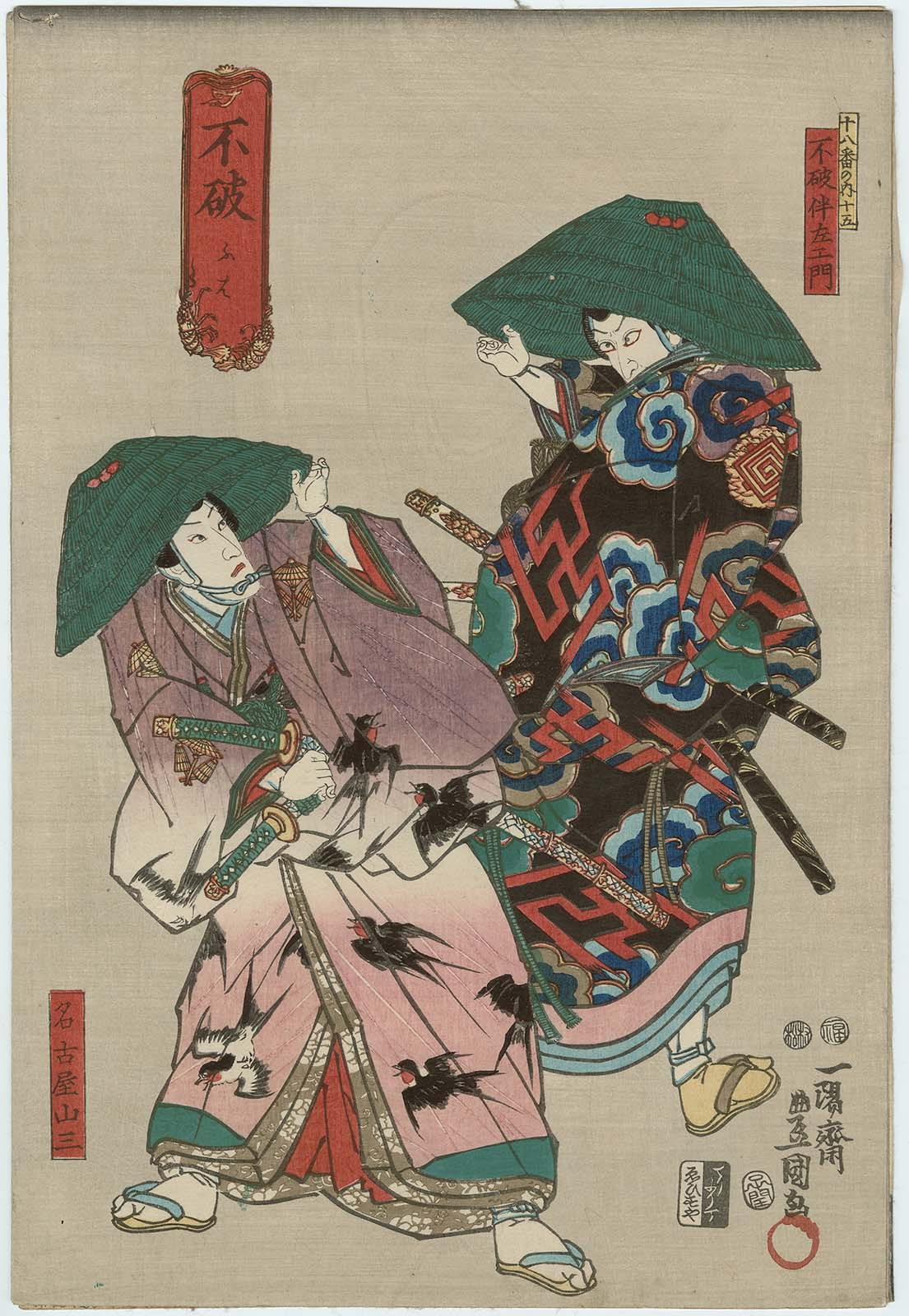
Fuwa* (1680)

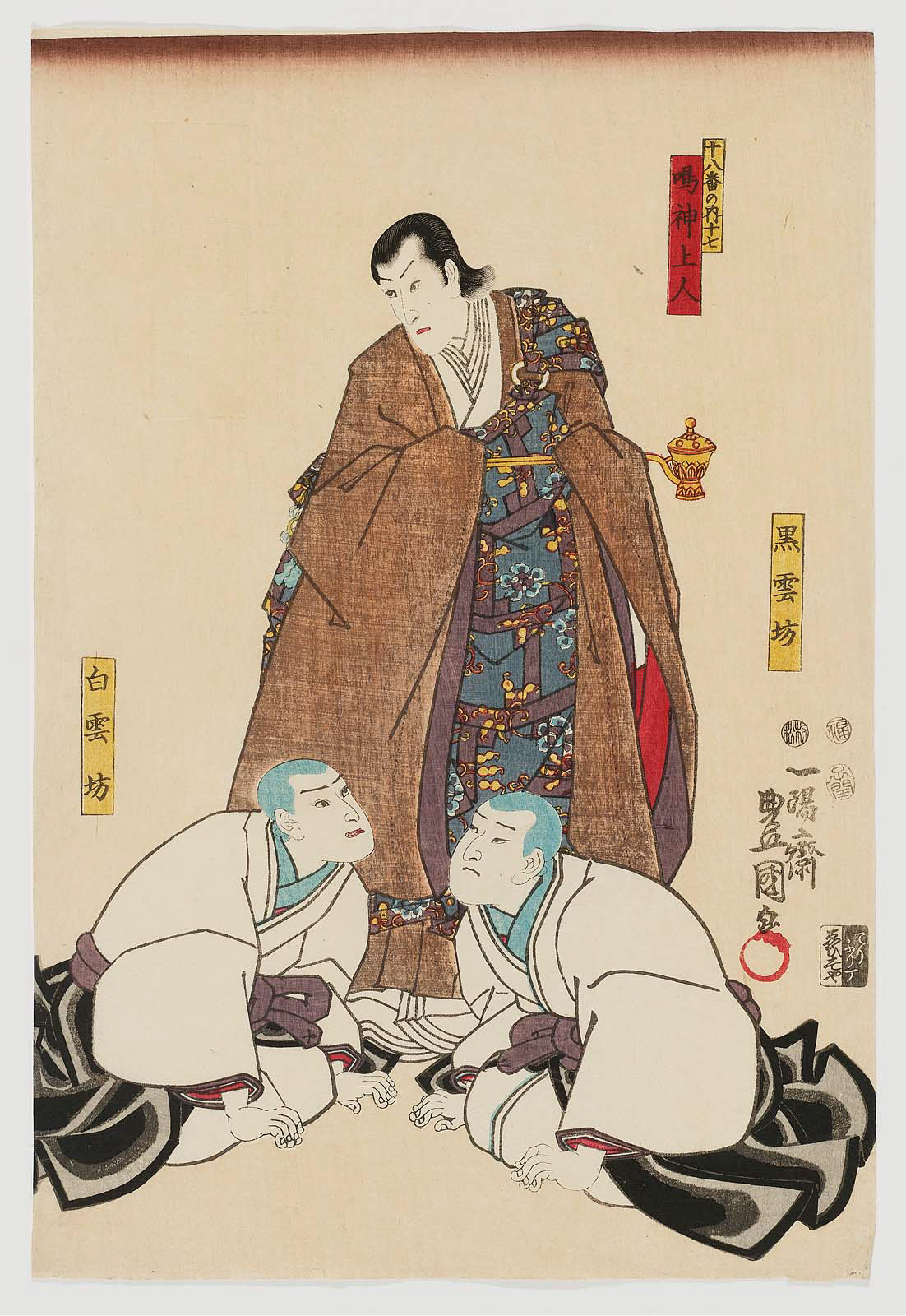
Narukami (1684)

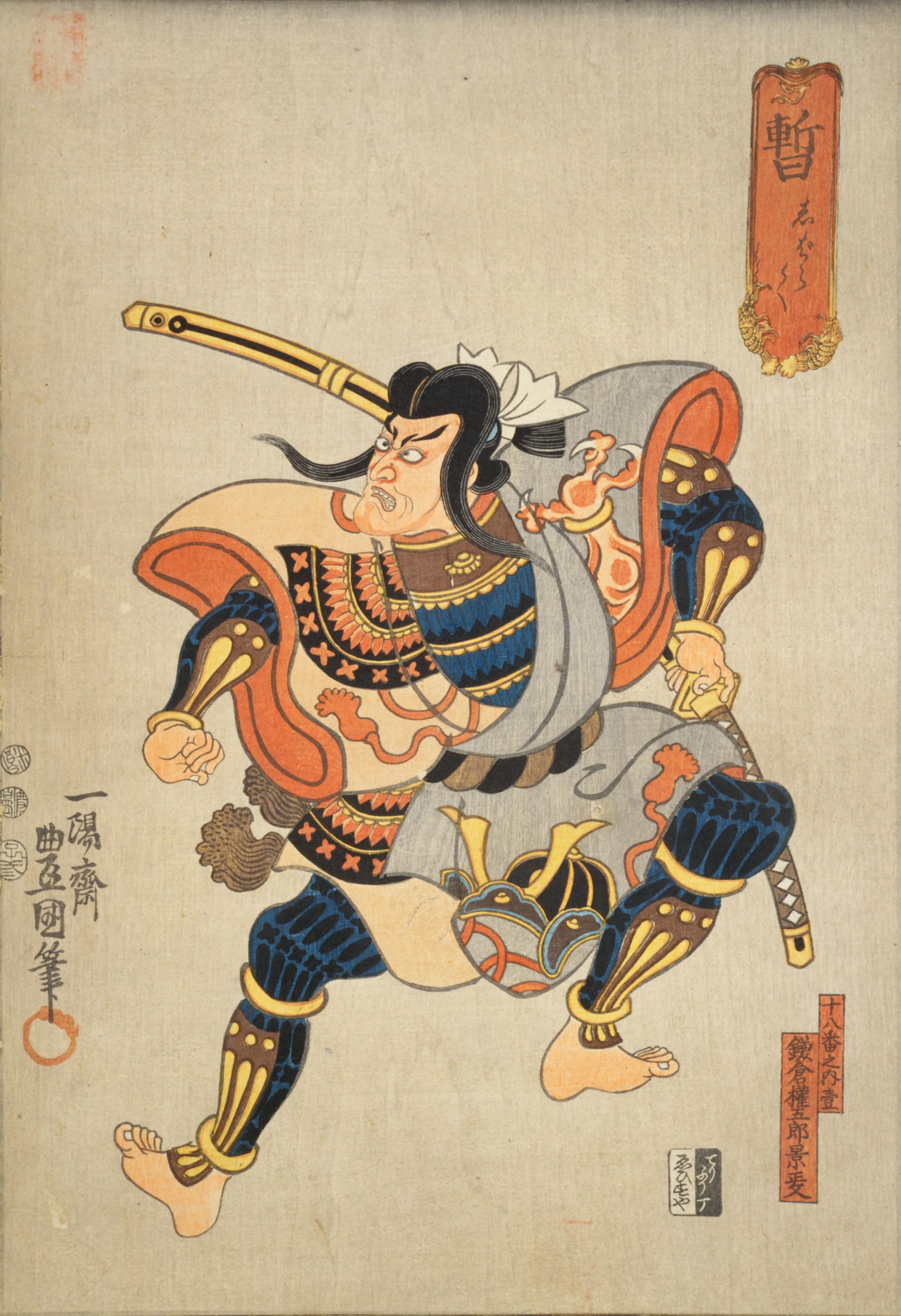
Shibaraku (1697)

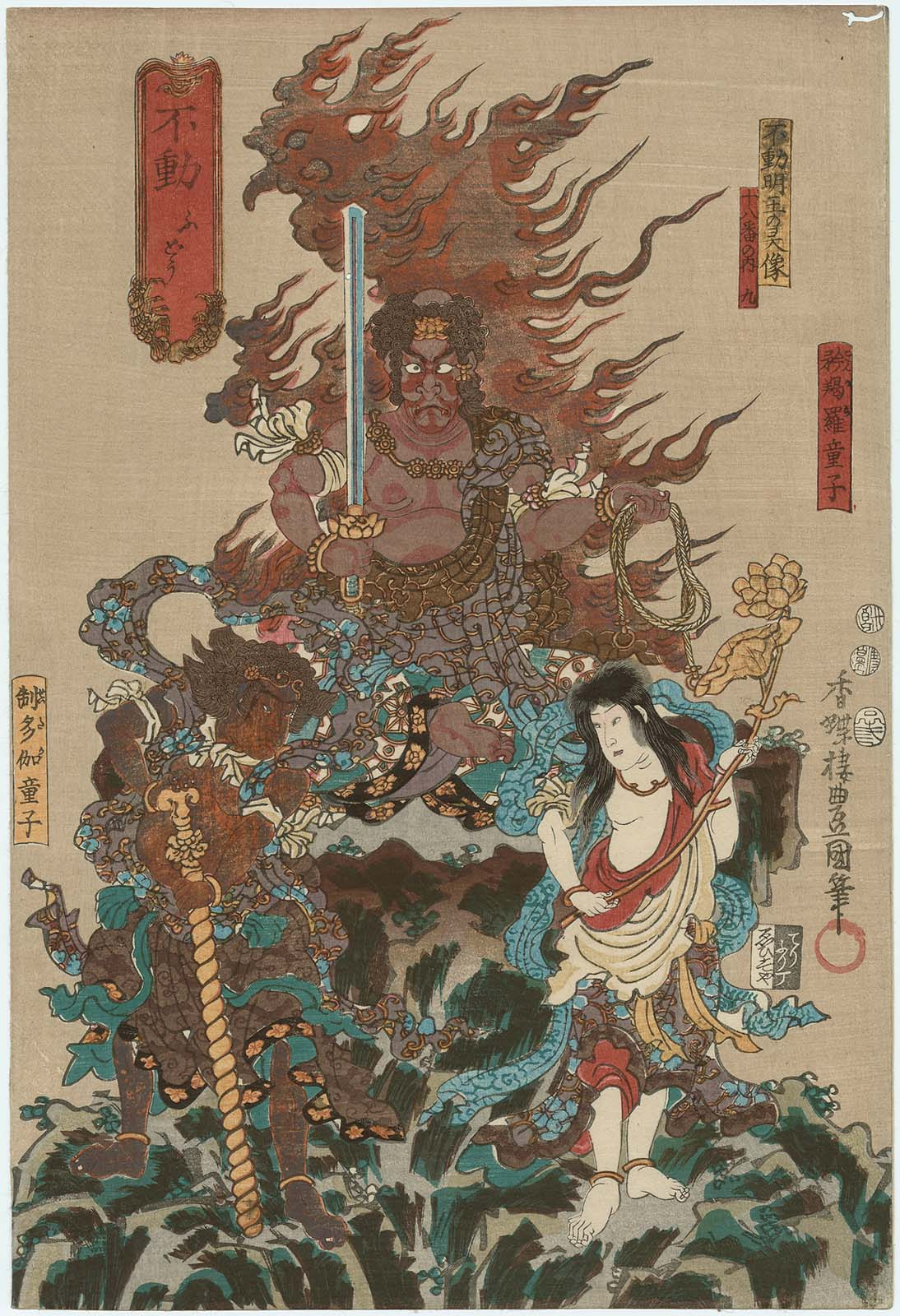
Fudō (1697)

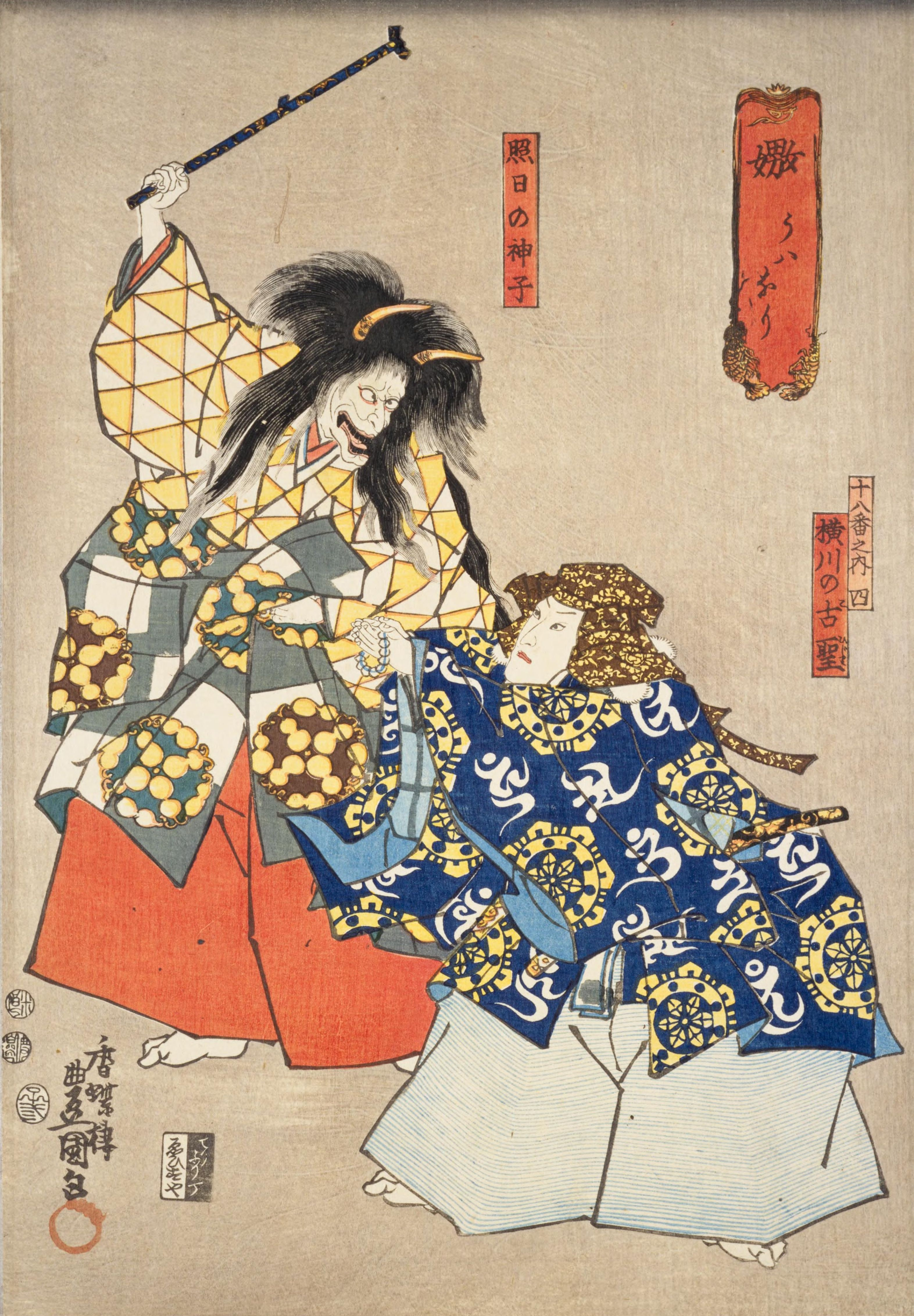
Soga no Uwanari* (1700)

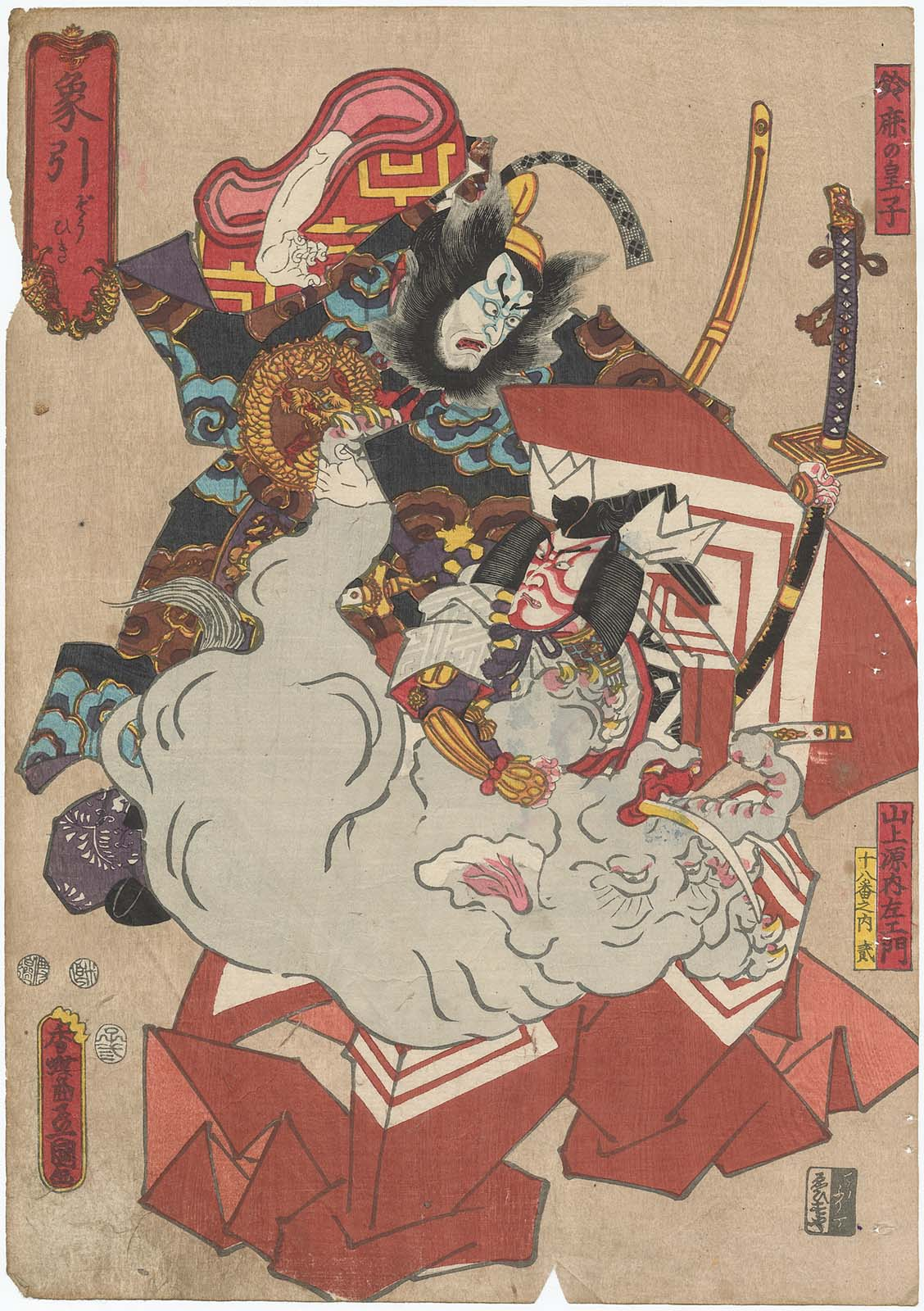
Zōhiki (1701)

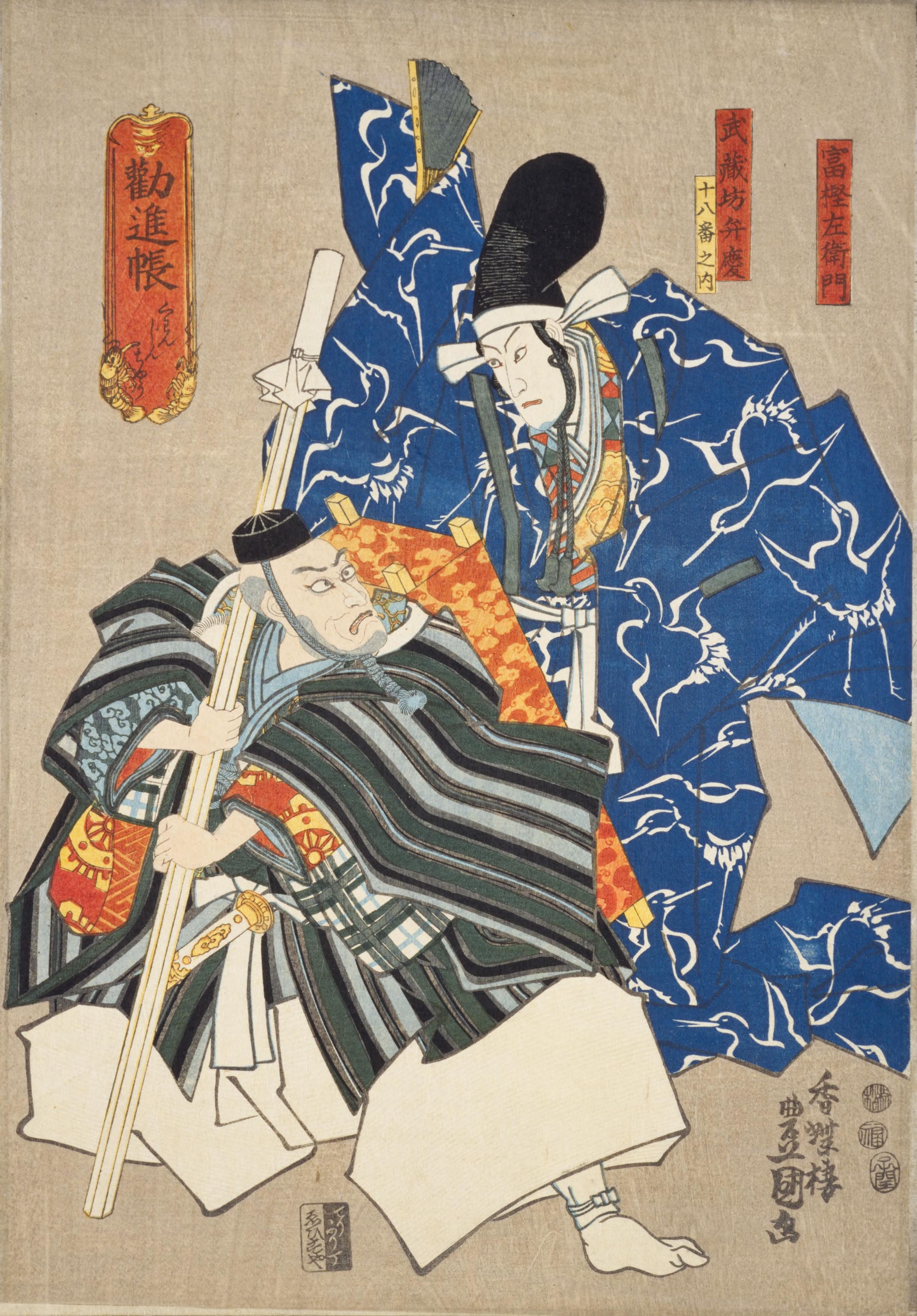
Kanjinchō (1702)

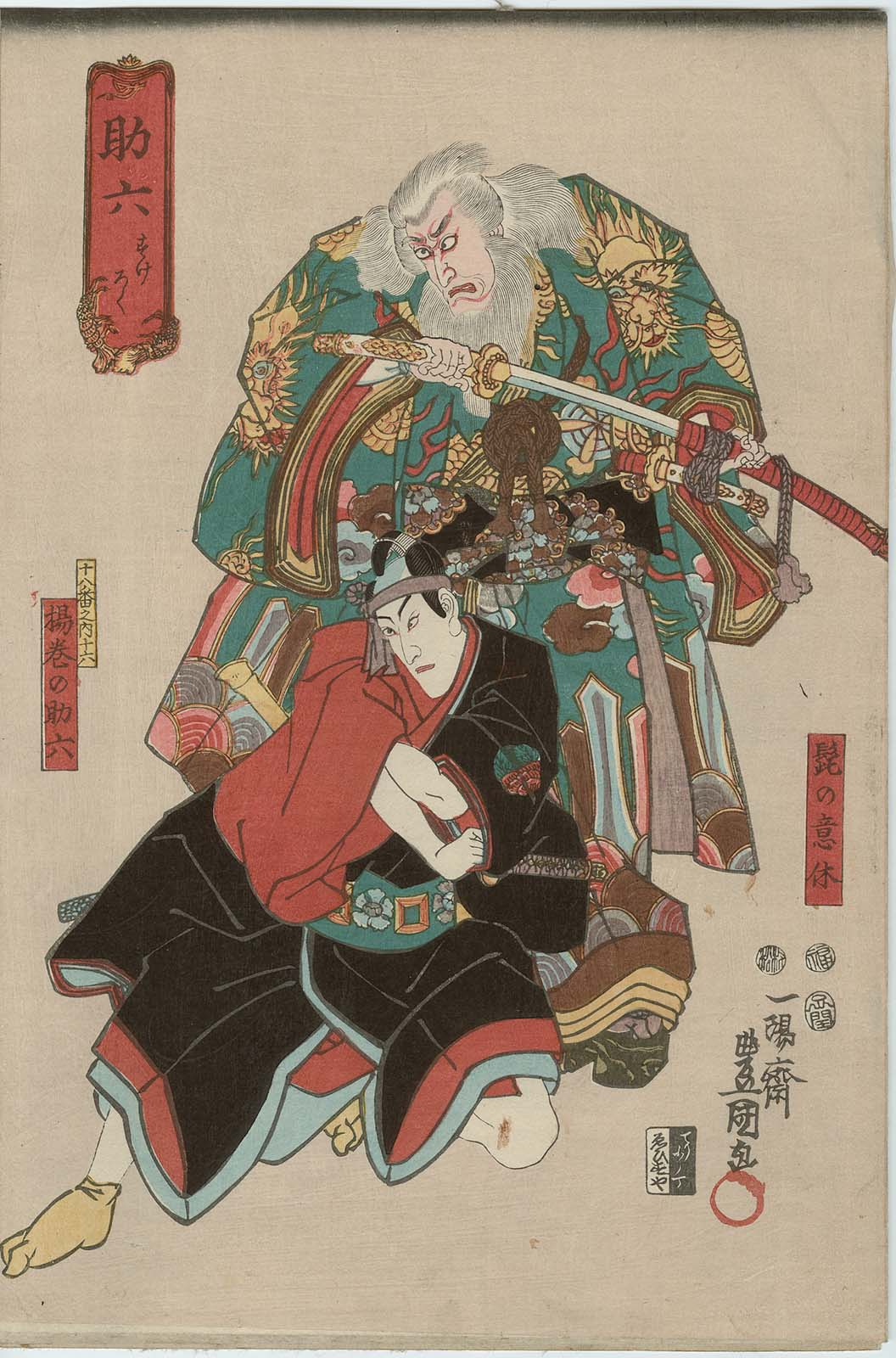
Sukeroku (1713)

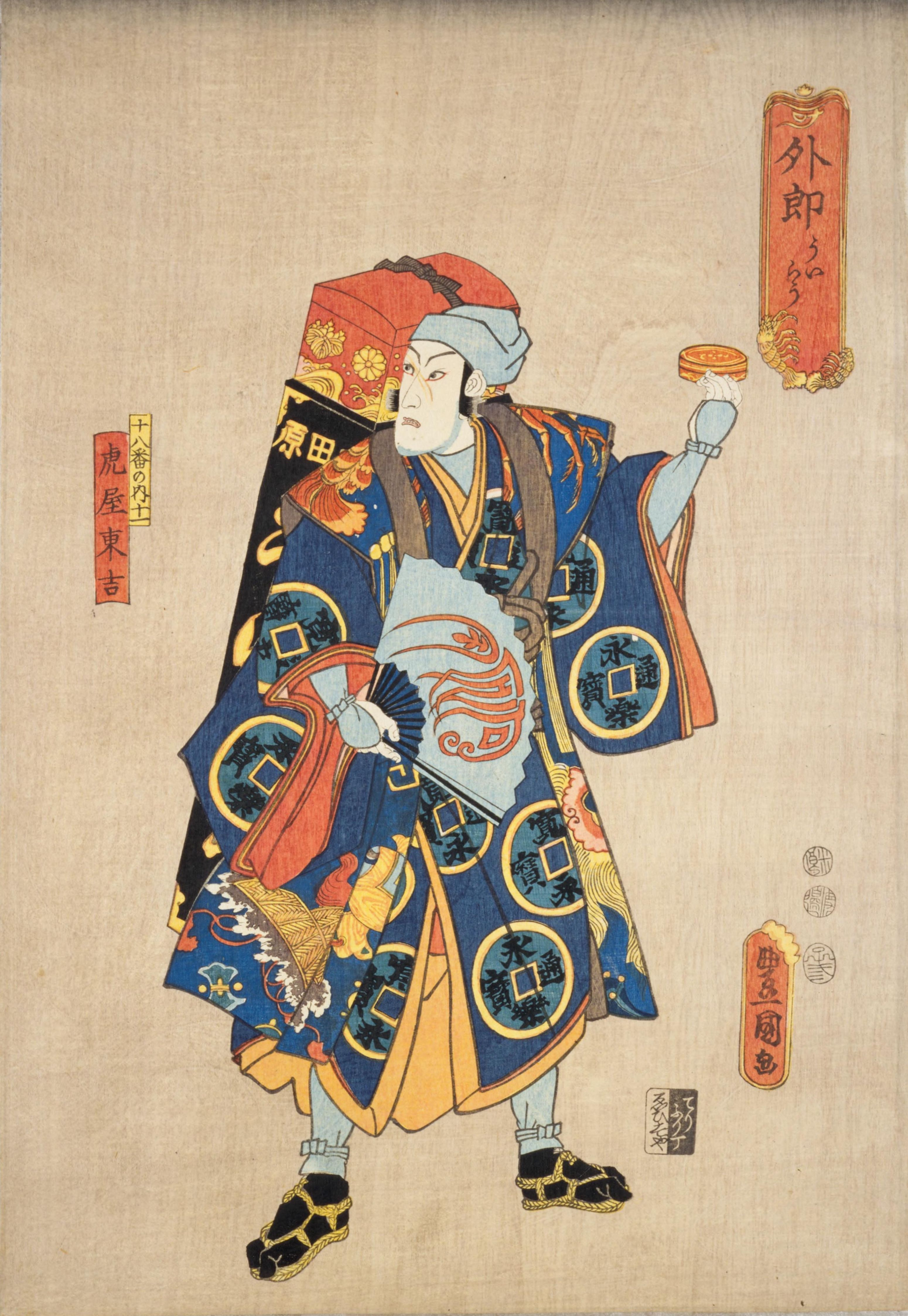
Uirō Uri (1718)

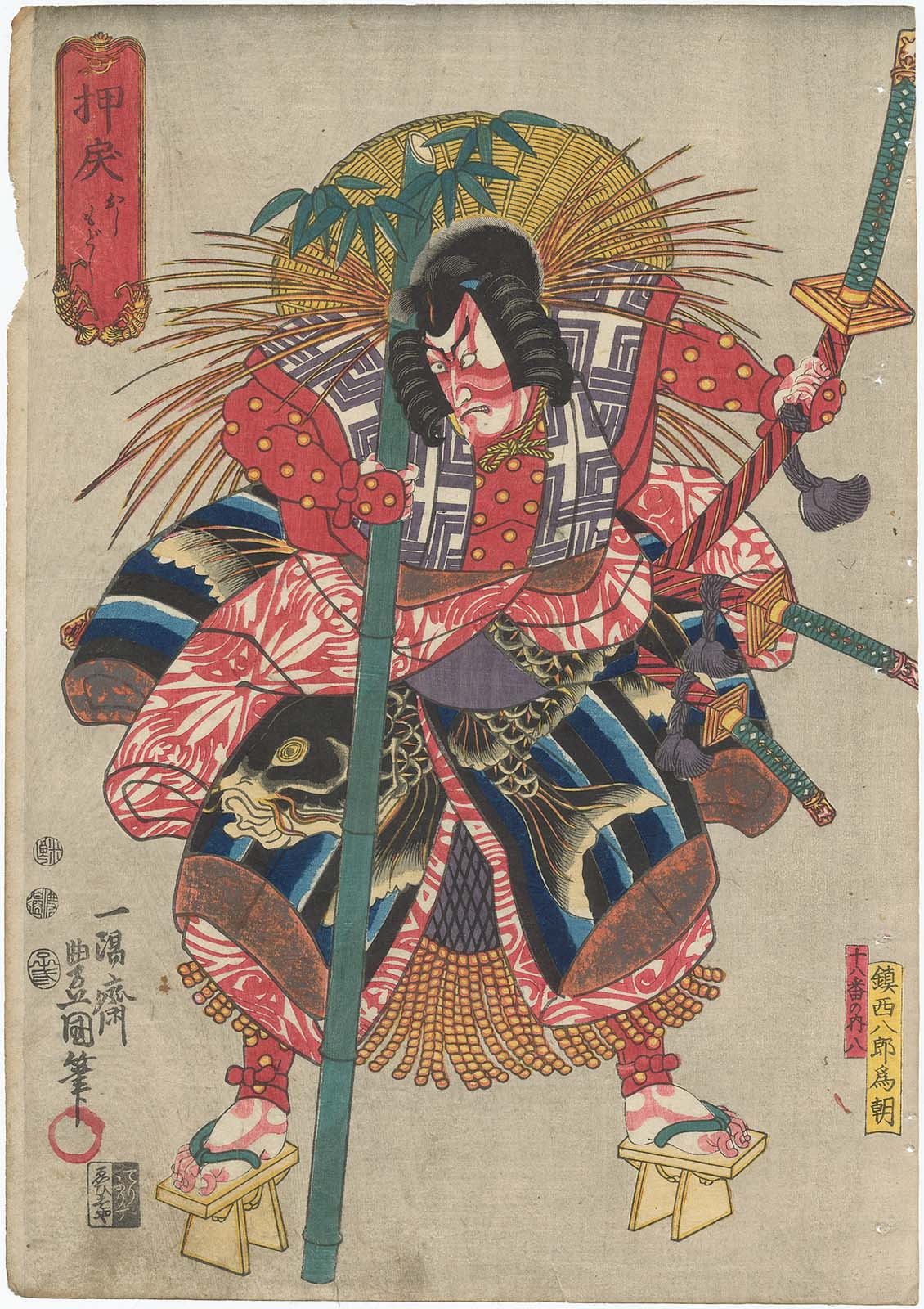
Oshimodoshi* (1727)

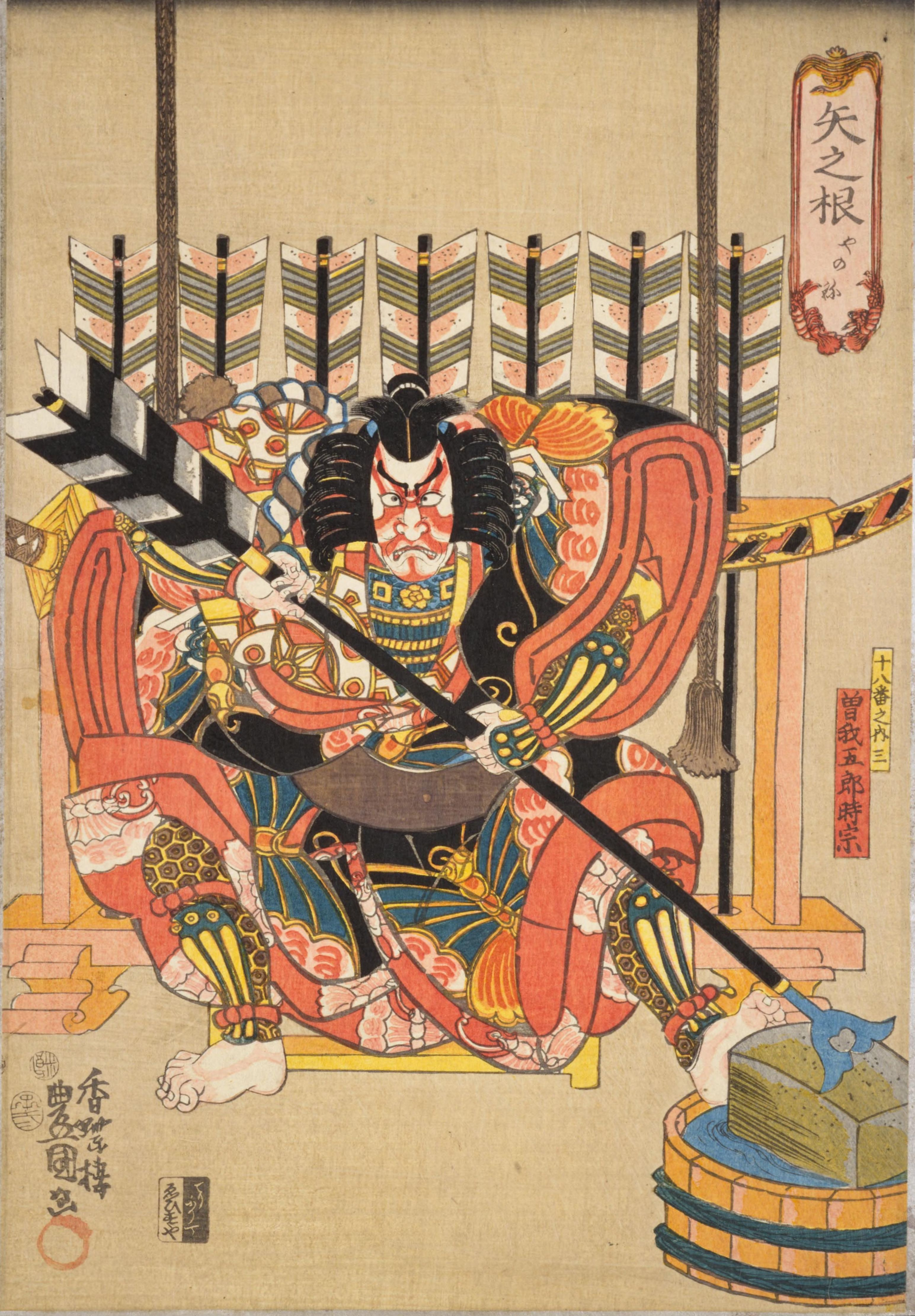
Ya-no-Ne (1729)

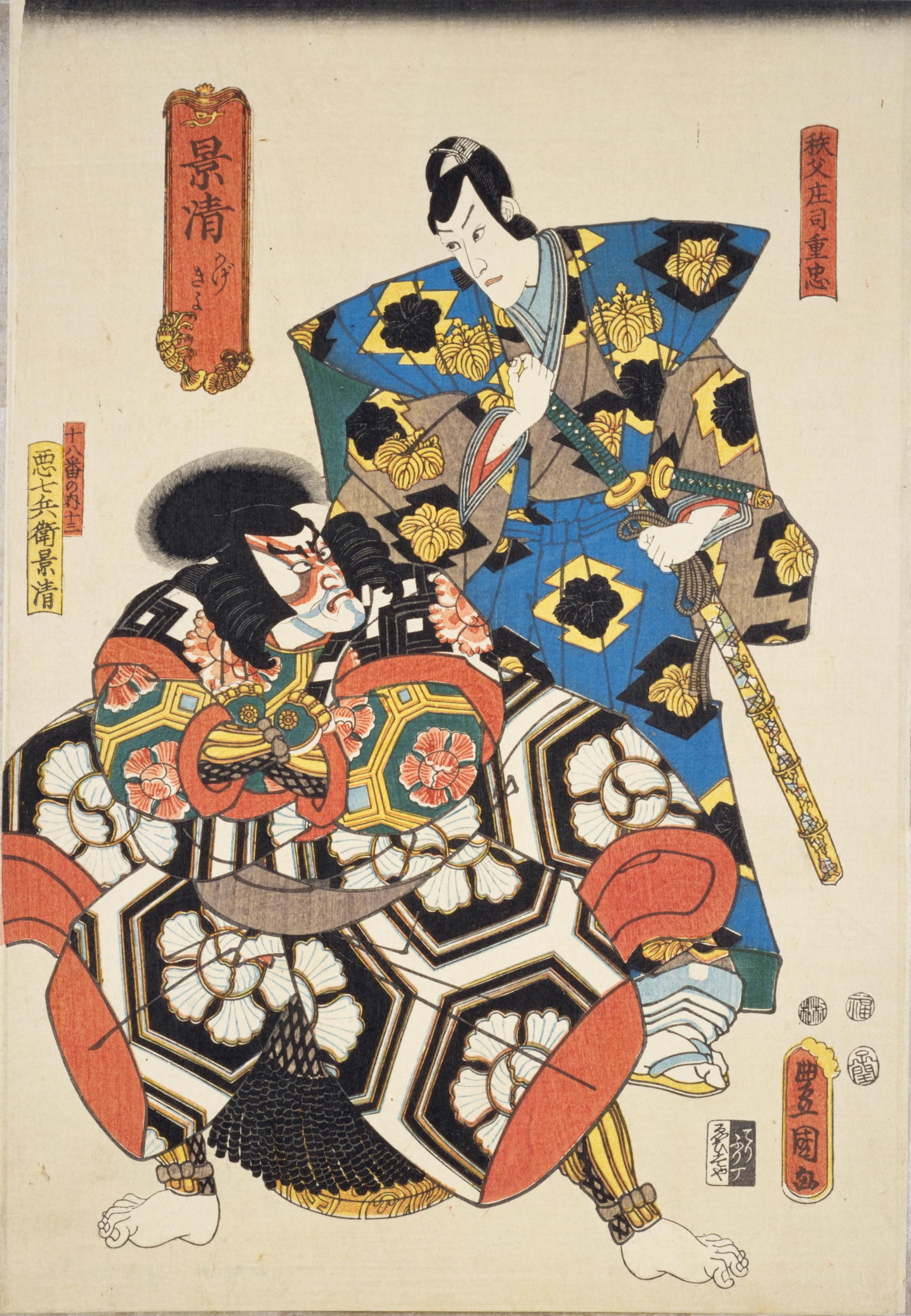
Kagekiyo (1732)

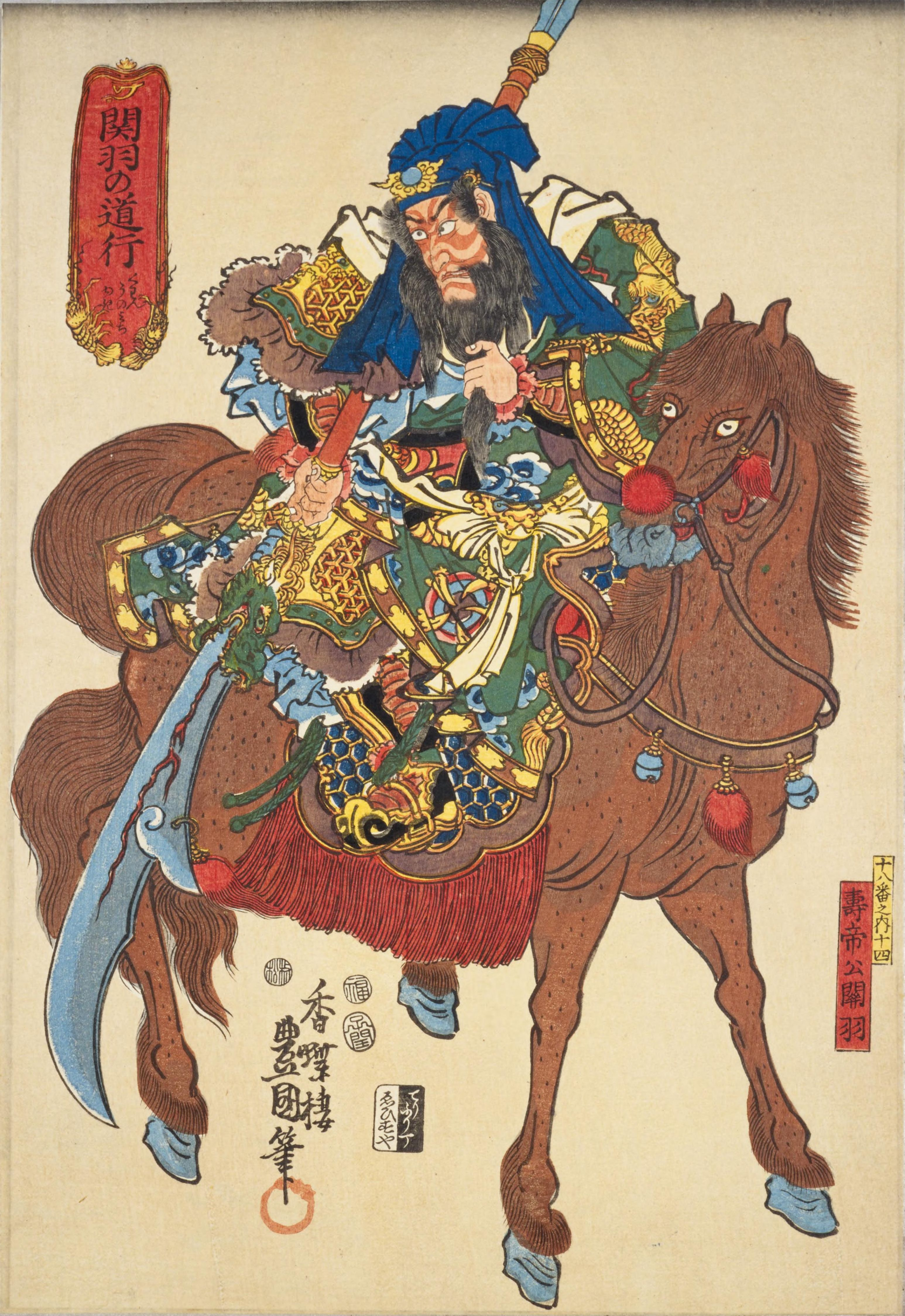
Kan'u (1737)

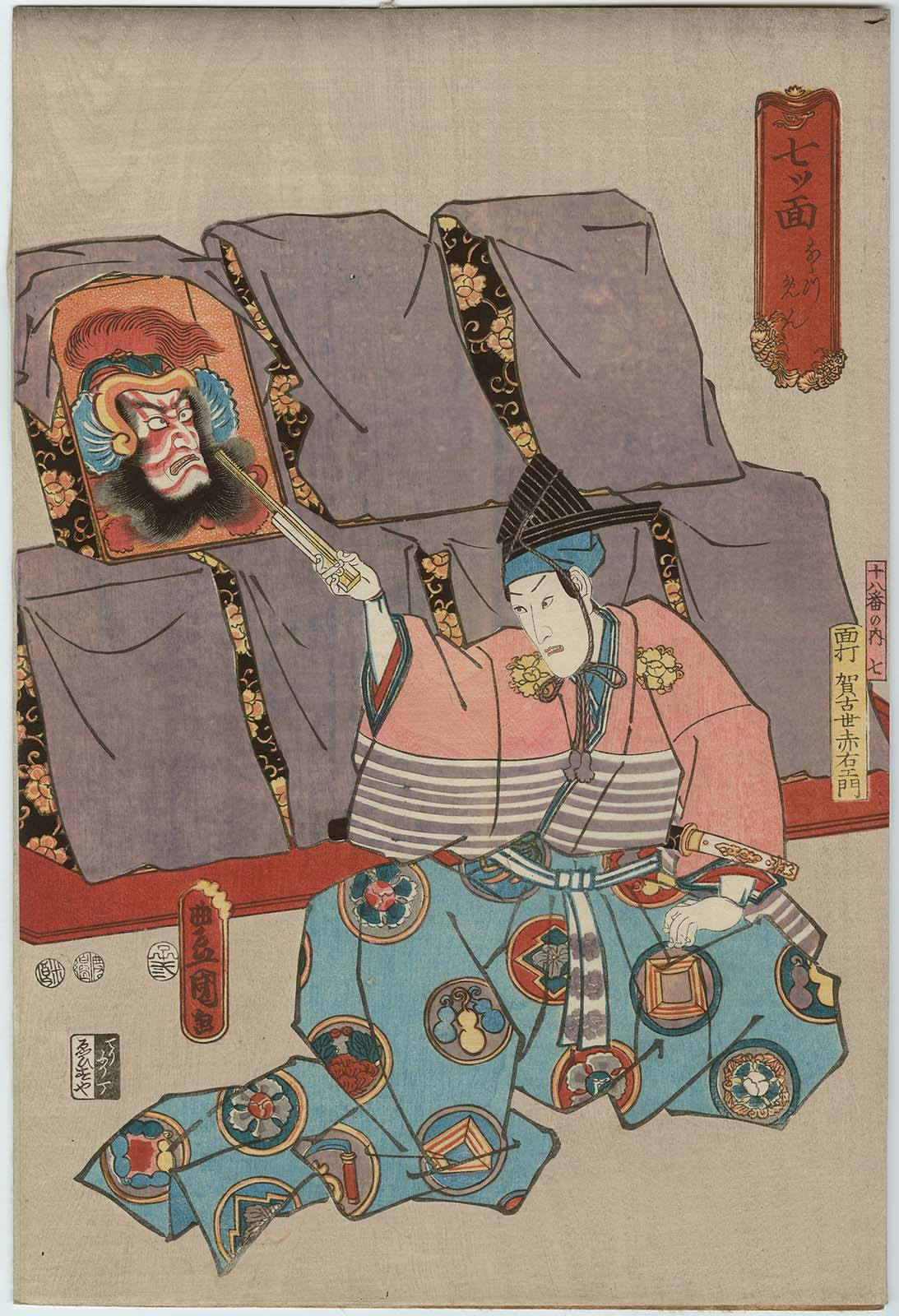
Nanatsumen* (1740)

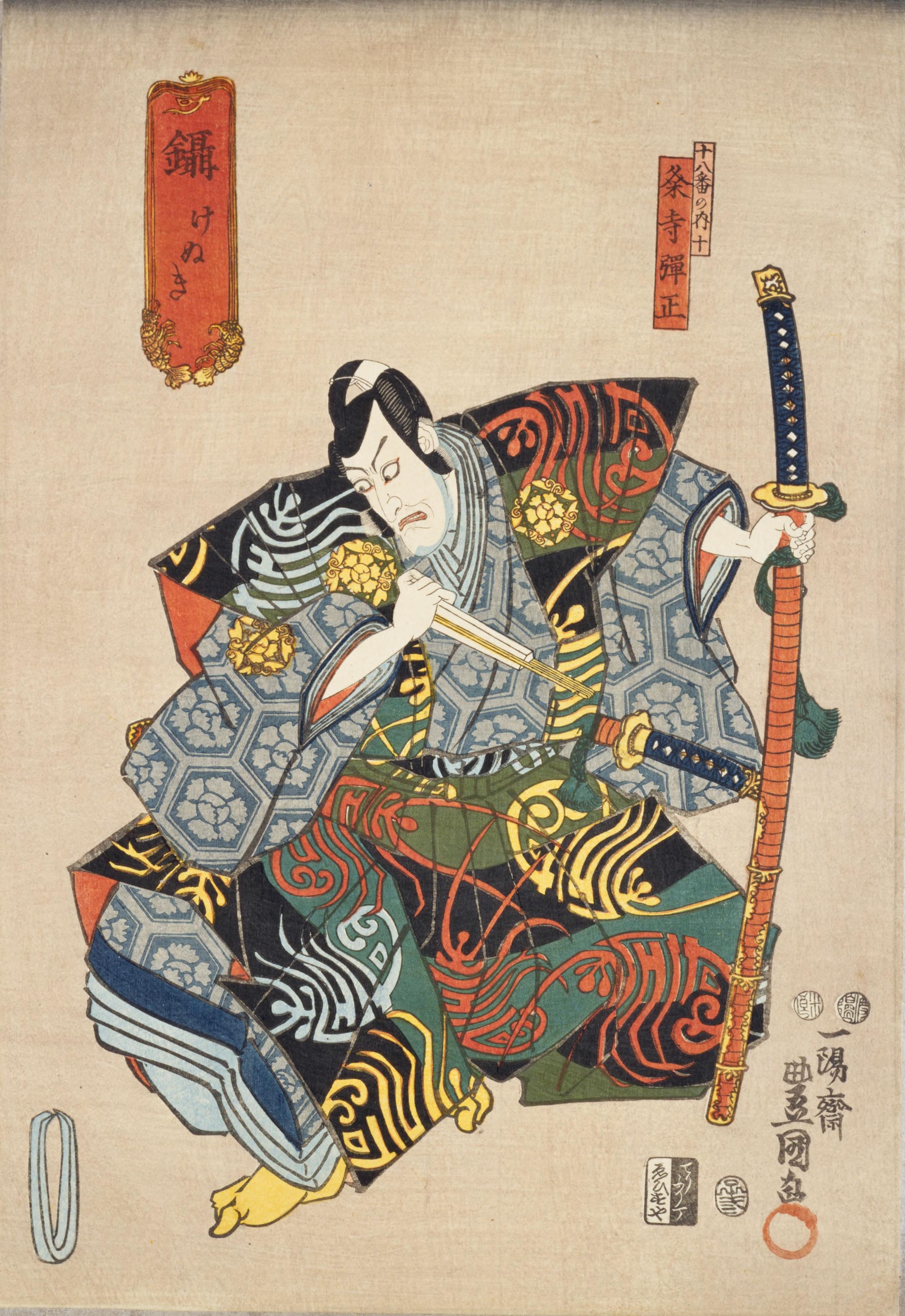
Kenuki (1742)

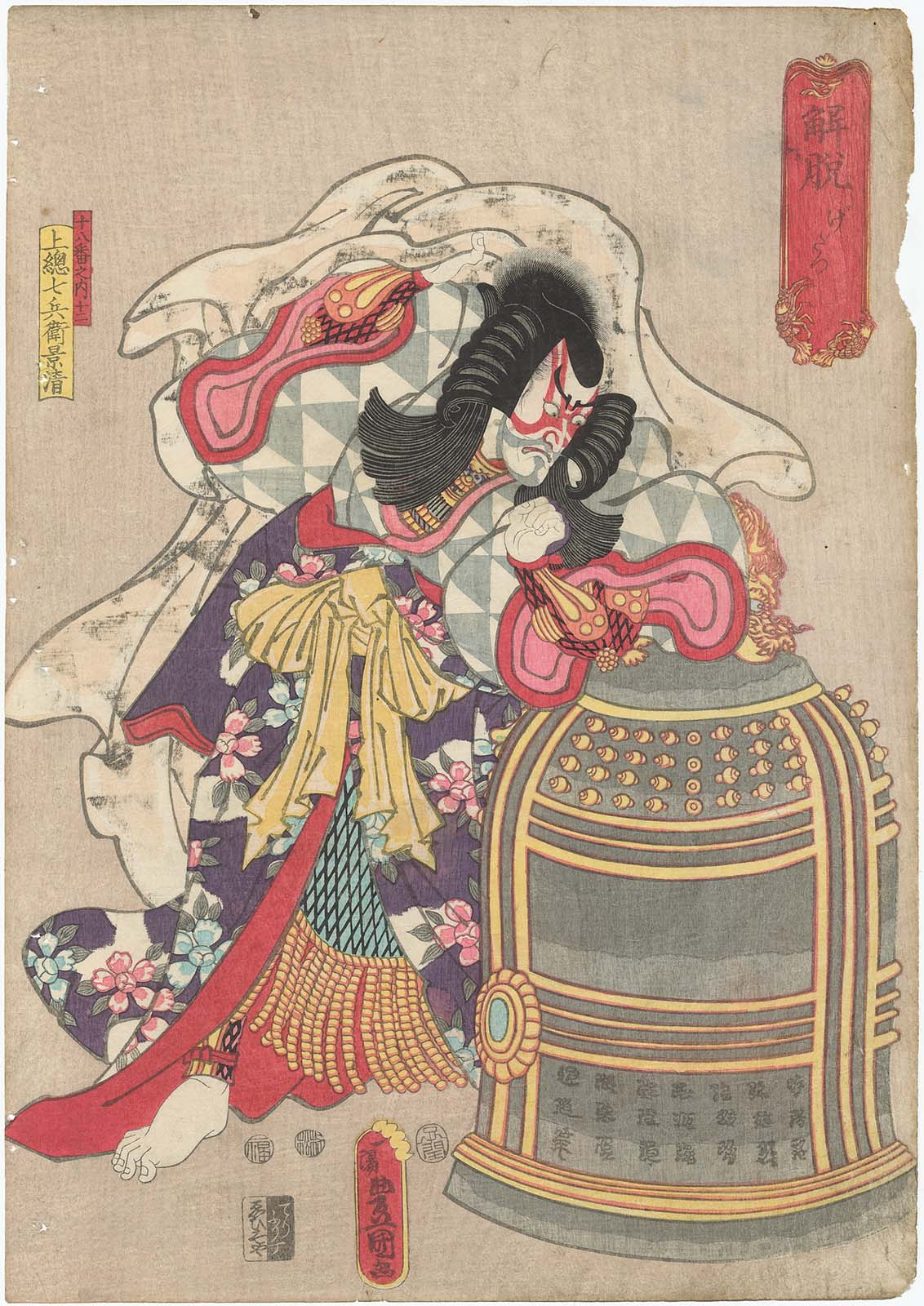
Gedatsu* (1760)

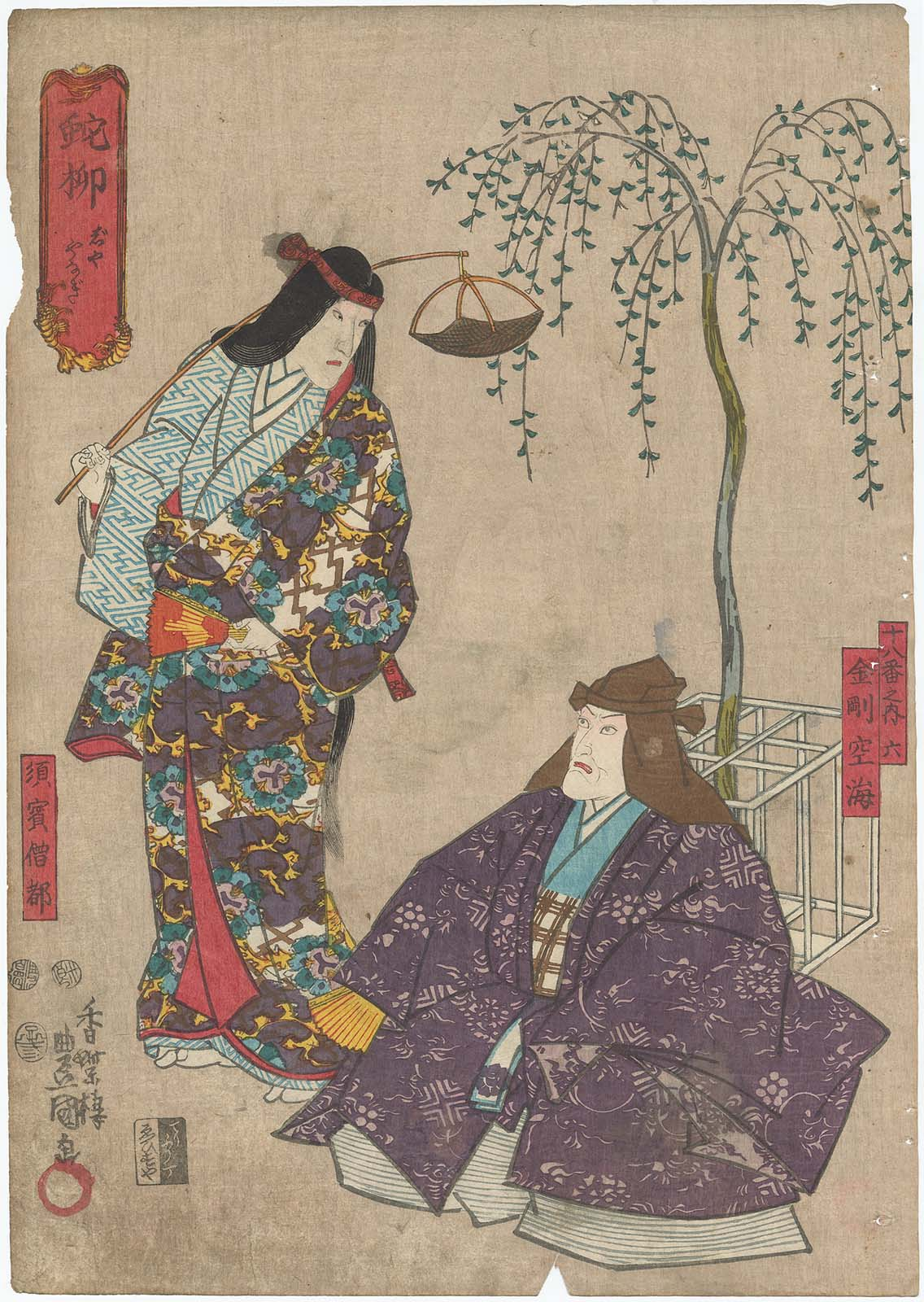
Jayanagi* (1763)

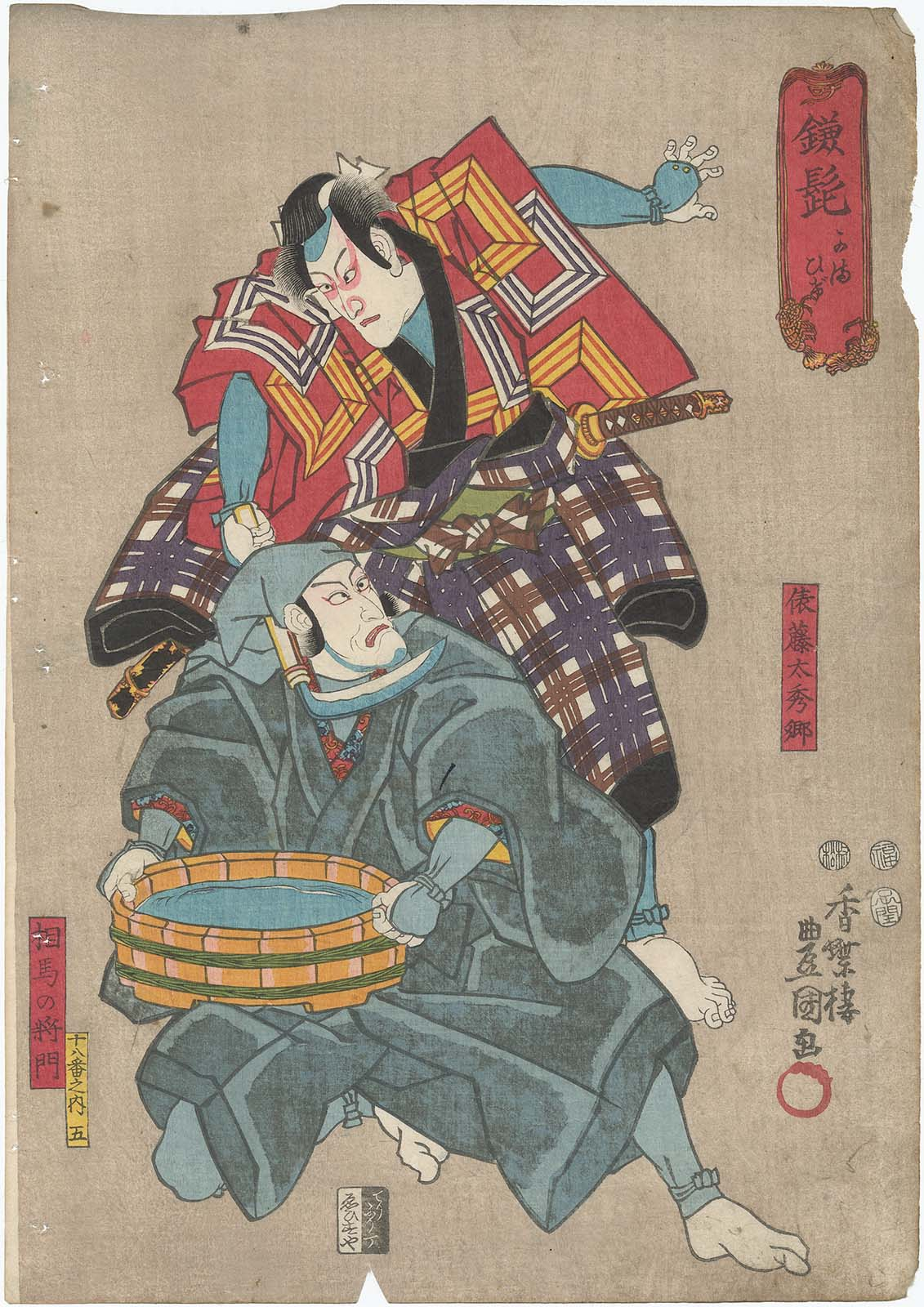
Kamahige (1769)

^{*} These plays are generally considered to be no longer performed (to have fallen out of the repertoire); however, revivals have been done, and continue to be done, while on the other hand some of those plays considered to still be in the repertoire may be performed only very infrequently.
