= Narukami (play) =

Kabuki play

Narukami 鳴神
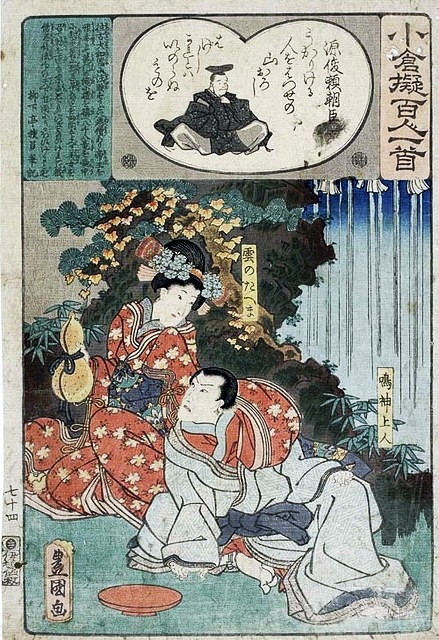
- a scene from Narukami, print by Utagawa Kunisada ca. 1864
- Written by: Tsuuchi Hanjuro; Yasuda Abun; Nakata Mansuke
- Characters: Narukami, Princess Taema
- Original language: Japanese
- Genre: jidaimono

Premiere
- Date premiered: 1742
- Place premiered: Onishi no Shibai, Osaka

Narukami (鳴神) is a kabuki play written by Tsuuchi Hanjūrō, Yasuda Abun and Nakata Mansuke and first performed in 1742.

The original version of Narukami dates from 1684, and it was one of the Kabuki Jūhachiban, a set of plays associated with the Ichikawa Danjūrō line of actors and the aragoto style of acting. This version was written by Ichikawa Danjūrō I, but it has been replaced by the 1742 play and is no longer performed in its original form. Narukami's original version was staged in 1684's 3rd lunar month at the Nakamura-za theatre and under the title Kadomatsu Shitennô.

In its current form, Narukami is act IV of the five-part play Narukami Fudo Kitayama Zakura. Nowadays Narukami is staged alone, and the whole play is only revived from time to time (once in 1967 and once in 2008).

Narukami is now a popular play frequently performed. It has been translated into English.

== Characters ==
- Narukami - a Buddhist saint
- Taema - a princess sent by the Emperor
- Hakuunbō - an acolyte of Narukami
- Kokuunbō - an acolyte of Narukami
- Acolytes
- Stage assistants

== Plot ==
Narukami holds a grudge against the imperial court, and captures the rain dragon. After capturing the dragon god, the imperial court ordered princess Taema to seduce Narukami and make it rain. She tells the story about her “late husband” and tells Narukami that she just wants to wash her husband's robes. She turns around and pretends to pull her skirts up, making Narukami faint. Before fainting, he recalls hearing a story where a priest lost his powers after seeing a woman's naked body.

After being seduced, Narukami quits being a priest and asks Taema's hand in marriage, she agrees. After Narukami and Taema drink sake to seal their marriage, Narukami becomes drunk and passes out. Meanwhile, Taema climbs the mountain to cut off the ropes sealing the dragon.

After Taema freed the dragon god, it starts to rain and thunder. Taema flees from the mountains and heads elsewhere. When Narukami woke up, his hair stood on end and says “I am so bitter to be deceived!” And starts throwing his students in a fit of rage. He looks for the princess to pursue her.

== Adaptions ==
In 1974, an opera adaption of the play, composed by Michio Mamiya, and performed using bunraku puppets rather than human actors, won the Salzburg TV Opera Prize. It has since been produced using human actors and singers for the cast.
