= You're No Good (Jesse Fuller song) =

1954 song by Jesse Fuller

"You're No Good" is a song by Jesse Fuller that appeared as the opening track on Bob Dylan's eponymous debut album (1962). Eight takes were recorded by Dylan on November 20, 1961. He learnt the song directly from Fuller in Denver; Fuller's own recorded version was not released until May 13, 1963, on his album San Francisco Bay Blues. The song concerns the narrator's difficult relationship with a woman, and concludes with the narrator wanting to "lay down and die". Dylan's version is more uptempo than Fuller's, and has some changes to the lyrics; it has been positively reviewed by critics.

== Jesse Fuller version ==
"You're No Good"

Song by Jesse Fuller

from the album San Francisco Bay Blues
- Released: May 13, 1963
- Label: Prestige Folklore
- Songwriter: Jesse Fuller
- Producer: Paul A. Rothchild

Jesse Fuller (1896–1976) was a one-man band musician, and inventor of the fotdella. His best-known song is "San Francisco Bay Blues", which he released on his debut album Working on the Railroad (1954). The track was later recorded by Ramblin' Jack Elliot and Donovan. "You're No Good", written and performed by Fuller, was released on his album San Francisco Bay Blues on the "Prestige Folklore" label on May 13, 1963. The album was later reissued on Stateside Records (1966). Fuller sings, and plays guitar, harmonica, kazoo, washboard, and fotdella on the album. Paul A. Rothchild is billed as "supervisor" on its back cover.

Author Spencer Leigh refers to "You're No Good" as "very close" to "San Francisco Bay Blues". The song outlines the narrator's difficult relationship with a woman who has "got the ways of a devil sleeping in a lion's den". The narrator claims that despite him supporting her when she was in poverty, she now gives his money to another man. The song concludes with the narrator wanting to "lay down and die". According to liner notes by Joe Boyd, Fuller experienced troubled personal relationships before meeting his wife. The notes claim, "Despite his vagabond ways, Jesse was always quite frugal and relatively conservative and women who drank and caroused until the early hours never got along well with Jesse."

== Bob Dylan version ==
"You're No Good"

Song by Bob Dylan

from the album Bob Dylan
- Released: March 19, 1962
- Recorded: November 20, 1961
- Studio: Columbia Studio A (New York City)
- Length: 1:40
- Label: Columbia
- Songwriter: Jesse Fuller
- Producer: John H. Hammond

Audio
- "You're No Good" on YouTube

=== Background and recording ===
Bob Dylan had seen Fuller perform at the Exodus coffee club in Denver in 1959, and learned "You're No Good" from him personally. (Note: It is also possible that Dylan learned the song from hearing Ramblin' Jack Elliot perform it.) It was the first song Dylan recorded at his initial session, on November 20, 1961, for his debut album Bob Dylan, which was released by Columbia on March 19, 1962. He recorded eight takes at Columbia Studio A, 799 Seventh Avenue, New York City, four of them complete whilst the others were false starts. The fifth take was used as the opening track for the album. Dylan sings, and plays guitar and harmonica on the song. The album was produced by John H. Hammond, and engineered by George Knuerr and Pete Dauria. Dylan biographer Clinton Heylin, who had access to unreleased tapes of the sessions, wrote that "from the first take, Hammond Sr is all at sea". Scholar Todd Harvey, however, interprets the session tapes as evidence that "corroborate[s] ... Hammond's suggestion that Dylan took a few minutes to adjust to the recording process". After one of the takes of "You're No Good", Hammond asked Dylan to play the song again "'cause we were fixing the balance as you were going on". Dylan wanted to use a spoken introduction, about a cowboy in Connecticut, to the song. This idea was abandoned after interruptions to early takes when Hammond complained that Dylan was popping the "p" sound in the word "planes". According to Heylin, the intention to splice different takes together, expressed by Hammond in the session would have been impractical as the sounds of the takes were too different.

Dylan's version is faster than Fuller's, and has some lyrical changes from the original, for example omitting the lyric that the woman addressed in the song could "make a preacher lay his bible down". Fuller was acknowledged on the liner notes by "Stacey Williams" (a pseudonym for critic Robert Shelton), which note that Dylan "learned [the song] from Jesse Fuller the West Coast blues singer". The track was wrongly listed on the label of some American pressings and the British LP as "She's No Good". Dylan gave a performance, which was recorded, at Eve and Mac Mackenzie's home in New York on November 23, 1961. His set included both "You're No Good" and Fuller's "San Francisco Bay Blues". As of 2022, Dylan has never played the song live in a public concert. Fuller's own album release of the song was over a year after Dylan's.

Shelton called the track "a nonsense song of the beleaguered male running down the offending female in his life". Author John Nogowski described it as "addressed to a woman Dylan says he loves but cannot quite figure out why".

Paul Williams felt that "You're No Good" was one of several songs on the album to "give hints of Dylan's rock and roll sensibilities". Williams commented that despite Dylan being a philanderer, he did not portray that on the album and, quoting from the track, wrote that "about the only sexy line on the album is 'when you get a crazy notion [of] jumping all over me'". Harvey thought that the song was chosen as the album opener "because it was upbeat and funny–a good opener".

=== Reception ===
In a negative album review in The Pittsburgh Press, William Allan referred to Dylan's "singing (sic)" and mentions "You're No Good" as one of several songs on the record that "[don't] have a publisher – or seem likely to have". Neil Spencer gave the song a rating of 3/5 stars in an Uncut magazine Dylan supplement in 2015, writing that all the songs on Bob Dylan "were treated to a lot of yelping, stuttering harmonica and none too special guitar playing". Nogowski calls the album track an "energetic performance" but rates it only at "C+". Shelton wrote about the song in his biography, No Direction Home, The Life and Music of Bob Dylan:

"the song scarcely proclaims a new singer of stature. Yet, the voice's spirit, drive, timbre, bite, and propulsion win attention, as does the instrumental work. At the break, Dylan builds his own one-man band. His galloping mouth harp talks to the guitar, which answers right back. Then the voice soars again, and the colloquy continues. Soon, we have a rollicking tumble of witty nonsense. The guitar work is quite clean here. As Dylan gets into the song, the broadness of his put-on comes forward, culminating in a couple of vocal riffs that suggest Elliott at his slyest. You're No Good' is one of the album's brightest moments."

Jeff Hanna of Nitty Gritty Dirt Band said in a 2022 interview he had been a fan of Dylan since the first album and, regarding "You're No Good", that Dylan "sings the heck out of that one".
