= Leviathan / Xasthur =

Studio album (split) by Leviathan and Xasthur
- Released: 2004
- Genre: Black metal, dark ambient
- Length: 39:06 (original); 64:57 (re-release)
- Label: Profound Lore Records (original); Battle Kommand Records (re-release); Southern Lord Records (second re-release)

Leviathan chronology
Black Metal Against the World (2004)	Leviathan / Xasthur (2004)	Demos Two Thousand (2005)

Xasthur chronology
To Violate the Oblivious (2004)	Leviathan / Xasthur (2004)	Nortt / Xasthur (2004)

Professional ratings
Review scores
Source	Rating
Allmusic	3/5 stars

Leviathan / Xasthur is a split album featuring music from black metal bands Xasthur and Leviathan. Tracks 1 through 7 were performed by Xasthur, while tracks 8 through 10 were performed by Leviathan.

== Track listing ==
1. The Eerie Bliss and Torture (of Solitude) – 4:47
2. Keeper of Sharpened Blades (and Ominous Fates) – 5:07
3. Conjuration of Terror – 7:23
4. Instrumental (drums by Wrest / Leviathan) – 3:39
5. Achieve Emptiness* – 2:53
6. Telepathic with the Deceased (rehearsal 11/04)* – 6:02
7. Palace of Frost (Katatonia cover)* – 4:06
8. Unfailing Fall Into Naught – 10:41
9. The Remotest Cipher (Beside the Last Breath Banished) – 8:23
10. Where the Winter Beats Incessant (Judas Iscariot cover)* – 11:56
- *Asterisks are bonus tracks featured on the re-released version.
