= One-man band =

Musician who plays various instruments

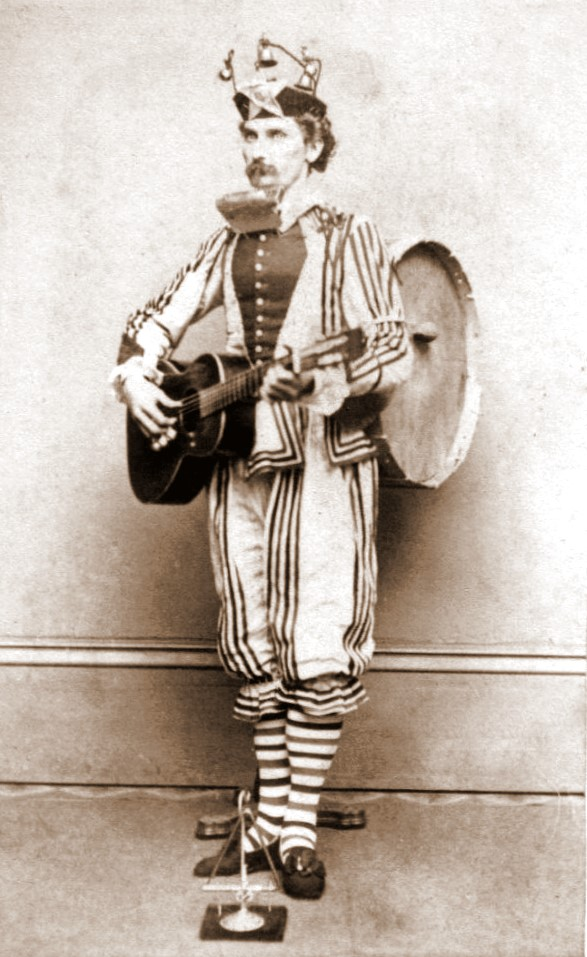
One-man band; photo by Knox of Athol, Massachusetts, in 1865

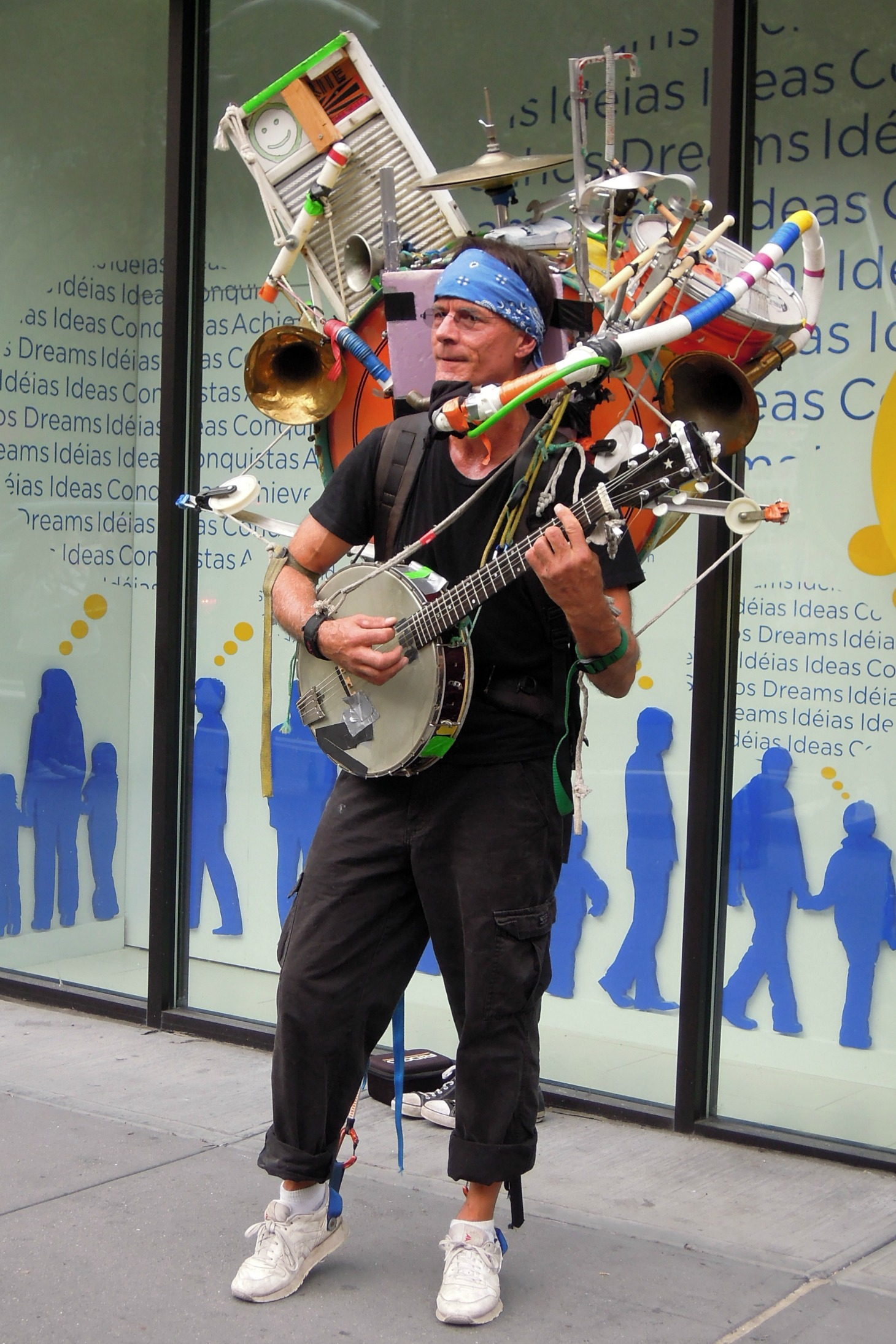
Jeff Masin, a one-man band in New York City

A one-man band, or a one-woman band, is a musician who plays a number of instruments simultaneously using their hands, feet, limbs, and various mechanical or electronic contraptions. One-man bands also often sing while they perform.

The simplest type of "one-man band" is a singer accompanying themselves on acoustic guitar and playing a harmonica mounted in a metal "harp rack" below the mouth. This approach is often taken by buskers and folk music singer-guitarists. More complicated setups may include wind instruments strapped around the neck, a large bass drum mounted on the musician's back with a beater which is connected to a foot pedal, cymbals strapped between the knees or triggered by a pedal mechanism, tambourines and maracas tied to the limbs, and a stringed instrument strapped over the shoulders (e.g., a banjo, ukulele or guitar).

Since the development of Musical Instrument Digital Interface (MIDI) in the 1980s, musicians have also incorporated chest-mounted MIDI drum pads, foot-mounted electronic drum triggers, and electronic pedal keyboards into their set-ups. In the 2000s and 2010s, the availability of affordable digital looping pedals has enabled singer-musicians to record a riff or chord progression and then solo or sing over it.

== History and meanings ==
=== Live instruments ===
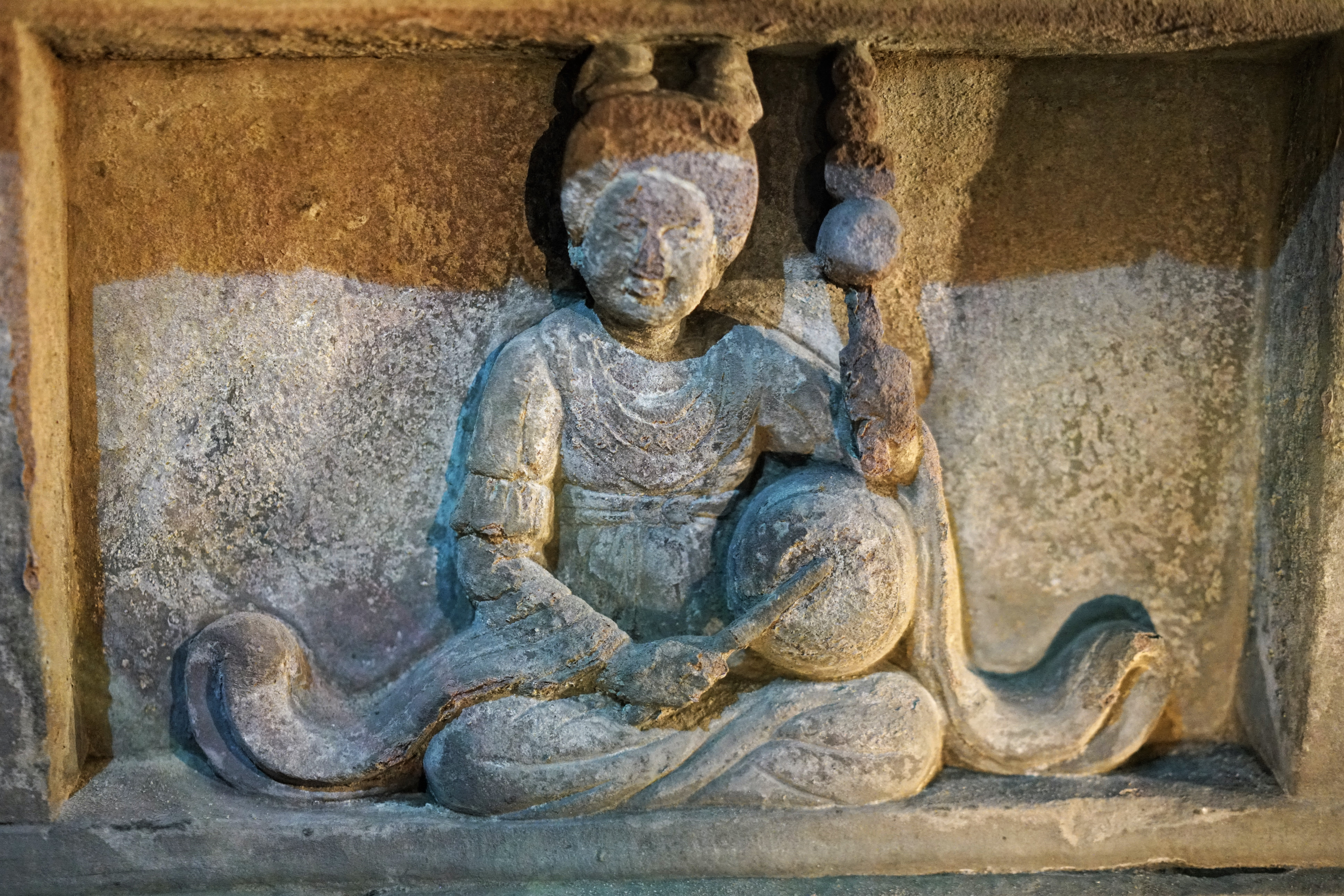
Drum and rattle drum played at the same time, from the tomb of Wang Jian

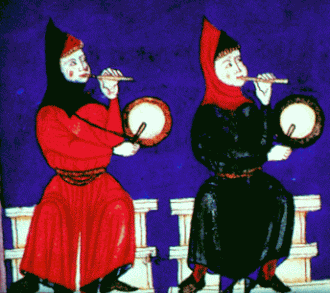
Pipe and taborers, from the 13th-century illuminated manuscript, Cantigas de Santa Maria

In ancient China, pan flute and rattle drum were often played at the same time by one musician during the Han dynasty, while drum and rattle drum were played at the same time in the court band of the Tang dynasty. Early known records of multiple musical instruments being played at the same time in Europe date from the 13th century, and were the pipe and tabor. The pipe was a simple three-holed flute that could be played with one hand; the tabor is more commonly known today as a snare drum. This type of playing can still be heard in parts of rural France, in England and Spain. An Elizabethan-era woodcut shows a clown playing the pipe and tabor. An 1820s watercolour painting shows a one-man band with a rhythm-making stick, panpipes around his neck and a bass drum and tambourine beside him. Henry Mayhew's history of London street life in the 1840s and 1850s described a blind street performer who played bells, the violin and accordions.

Guitarist Jim Garner played guitar with his hands and triangle with his feet, and Will Blankenship of the Blankenship family of North Carolina played harmonica, autoharp and triangle in shows during the 1930s. In the 1940s, entertainer and clown Benny Dougal used a crude "stump fiddle" (a single string stretched on a stick) with a footpedal-operated pair of cymbals. Blues singers such as "Daddy Stovepipe" (Johnny Watson) would sing, play guitar, and stomp their feet for rhythm, or used a foot pedal to play bass drum or cymbal.

One of the earliest modern exponents of multiple instruments was Jesse Fuller. Fuller developed a foot-operated bass instrument which he called the "footdella", which had six bass strings which were struck by hammers. In "one-man-band" shows, Fuller would use his "footdella", a footpedal-operated "sock" (hi-hat cymbal), a homemade neck harness (for a harmonica, kazoo and microphone), and a 12-string guitar. Fate Norris, of the Skillet Lickers, a hillbilly string band of the 1920s and early 1930s developed a geared mechanical contraption with footpedals that enabled him to play guitar, bells, bass fiddle, fiddle, autoharp and mouth harp.

Joe Barrick, who was born in Oklahoma in 1922, wanted a way of accompanying himself on fiddle, so he built a contraption with a guitar neck on a board with footpedals to operate the notes. Subsequent versions of this "piatar" also had bass guitar and banjo necks and a snare drum which are played by foot-operated hammers. To change notes on the guitar-family instruments, a foot treadle operates a mechanical fretting device. Two notable one-man blues bands active in Memphis in the 1950s were Doctor Ross and Joe Hill Louis, playing guitar, harmonica and bass drum/high-hat.

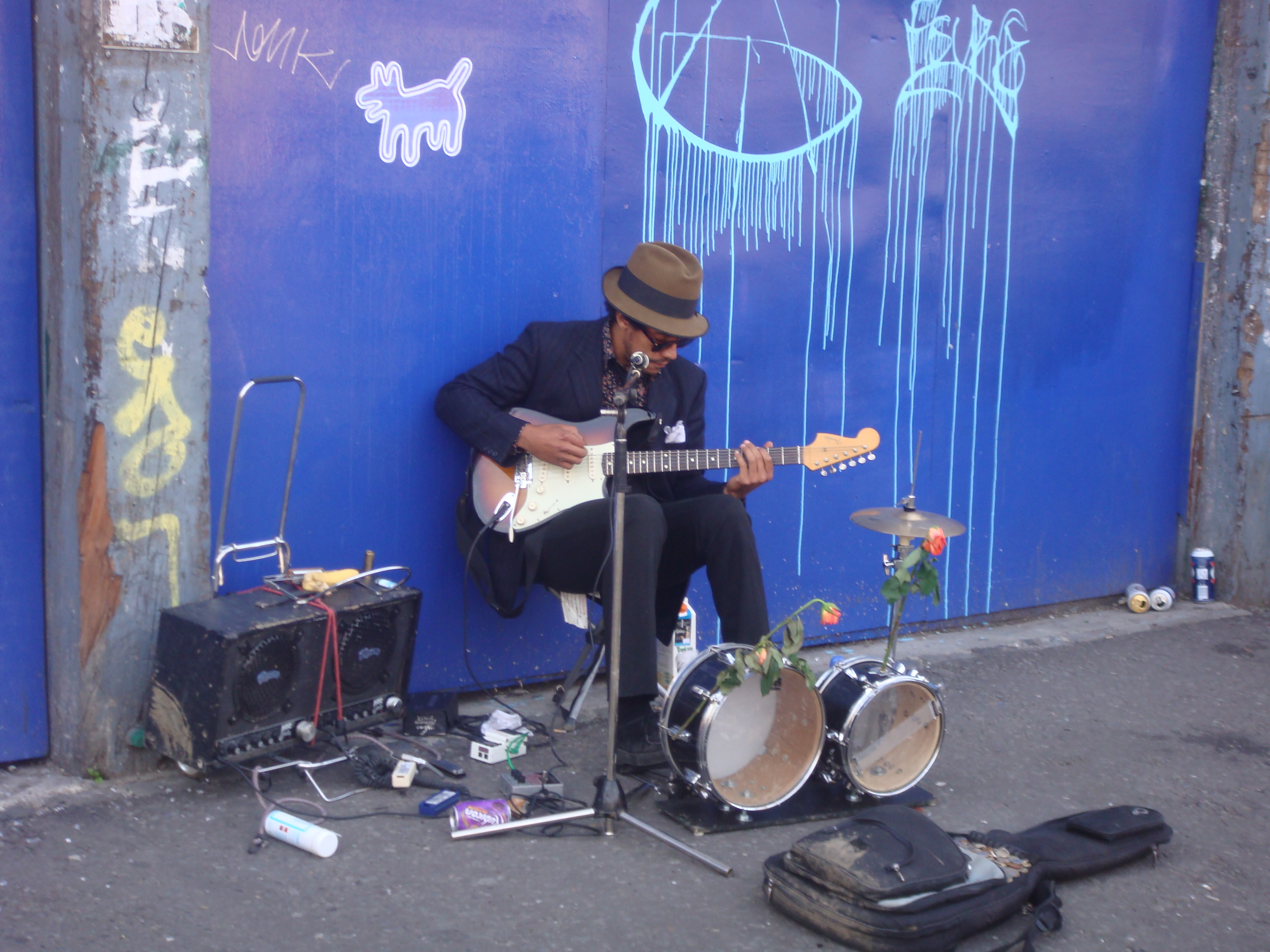
Musician in London performs on electric guitar and a small drum kit

The simple guitar and harmonica combination (as used by such musicians as Tex Williams, Anton Newcombe, Jimmy Reed, Bob Dylan, Neil Young, and Ray Dorset of Mungo Jerry) is so common now that it is rarely considered to be a one-man band. British-born Don Partridge made the classic one-man band outfit (bass drum on the back, guitar and harmonica) famous in the streets of Europe, and was an early busker to enter the Top Ten of the UK Singles Chart, with his hit singles "Rosie" and "Blue Eyes" in 1968. Modern one-man bands include such performers as Hasil Adkins and Sterling Magee, better known as "Mister Satan," from Satan and Adam.

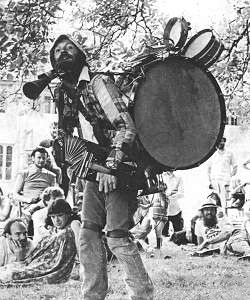
Vic Ellis of Sussex

"The one-man band exists, in all its uniqueness and independence, as a most elusive yet persistent musical tradition. As a category of musicianship it transcends cultural and geographic boundaries, spans stylistic limits, and defies conventional notions of technique and instrumentation. Defined simply as a single musician playing more than one instrument at the same time, it is an ensemble limited only by the mechanical capabilities and imaginative inventiveness of its creator, and despite its generally accepted status as an isolated novelty, it is a phenomenon with some identifiable historical continuity."

=== Studio recording ===
The term "one-man band" is also colloquially used to describe a performer who plays every instrument on a recorded song one at a time, and then mixes them together in a multitrack studio. While this approach to recording is more common in electronica genres such as techno and acid house than R&B and rock music, some R&B and rock performers such as Joe Hill Louis, Stevie Wonder, Prince, Lenny Kravitz, Paul McCartney, Elliott Smith, Kevin Parker, Kabir Suman, Dave Edmunds, John Fogerty, Emitt Rhodes, Todd Rundgren, Pete Townshend, Steve Winwood, Roy Wood, Nik Kershaw, Dave Grohl (Foo Fighters), and Les Fradkin have made records in which they play every instrument (one after the other). Mike Oldfield was noted for using this recording technique during the recording of his 1973 album Tubular Bells. Other examples of a one-man band in the recording studio are Trent Reznor for Nine Inch Nails, jazz piano player Keith Jarrett for his album No End, Peter Tägtgren for Pain (musical project), Chris Carrabba for the first two albums released by Dashboard Confessional, Varg Vikernes for Burzum and Billy Corgan for The Smashing Pumpkins since 2009.

Nash the Slash (1948–2014) played all instruments on his recordings. He also played solo concerts from 1975 to 2012, using synchronized drum machines and synthesizers as he plays either an electric violin or electric mandolin. Some artists record and mixed their music in a multitrack studio and synchronize it with video multitrack video playing on all instruments, creating a one-man band illusion.

One-man bands in this context have become more common in extreme metal, especially black metal, where a number of bands apart from Burzum consist of only one member. Such artists include Nargaroth, Xasthur, Falkenbach, Arckanum, Nortt, Horde, and others. While most of these bands do not play live, some such as Nargaroth hire additional musicians for live performances.

"One-woman band" is not used very often in the vernacular, but women have increasingly had a presence as musicians in most forms of music. Edith Crash who creates "dark and haunting, drawn-out melodies".

=== Live looping ===
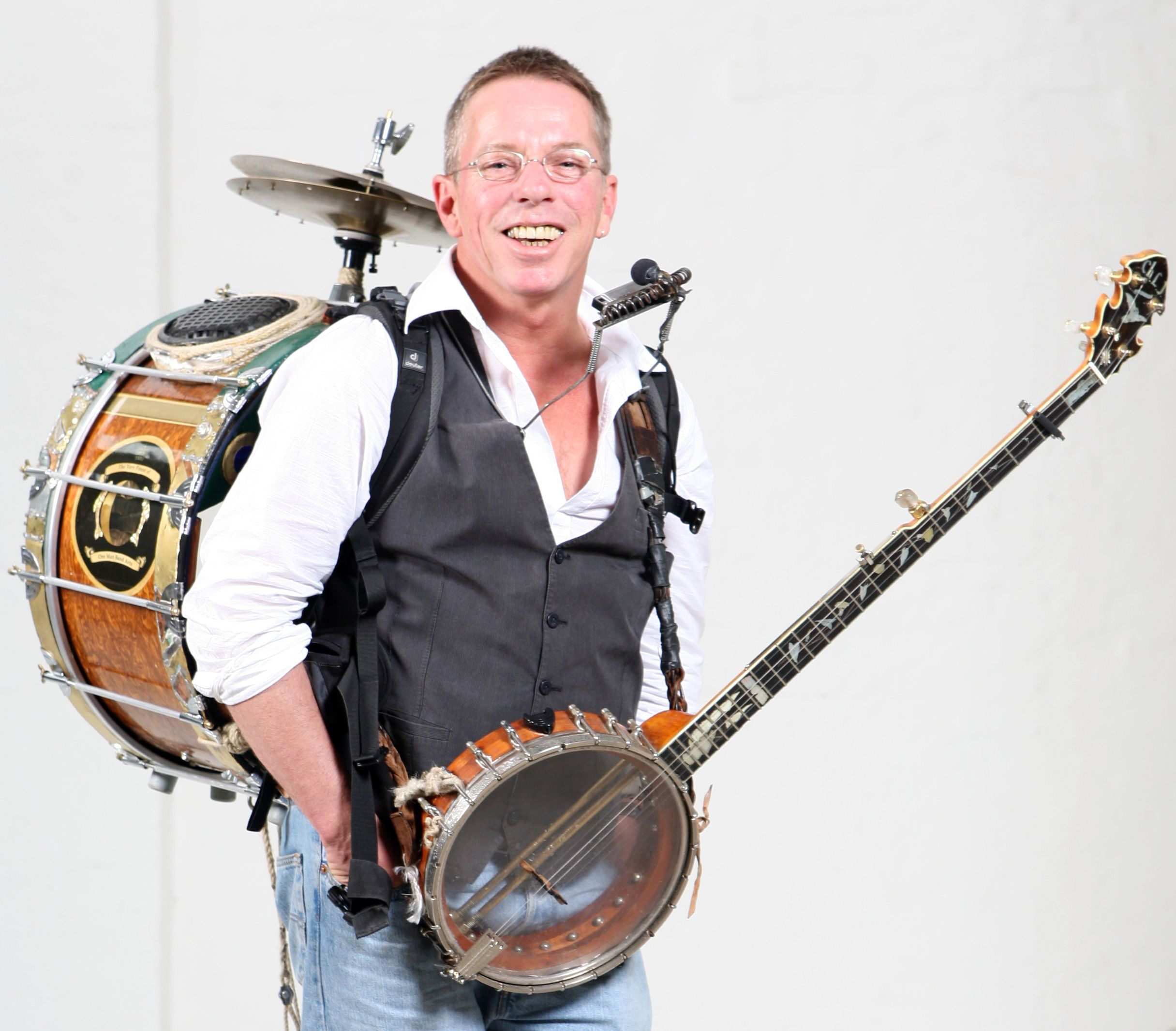
Chris Lejeune 2007

In the 2000s, as digital looping pedals became widely available, performers have been able to use a mixture of previously recorded music, delay effects, and looping devices in live performances of everything from beatboxing to classical violin. Live looping performers create layered looped accompaniment for musical solos that are sung or played later in the song. Using this technology, a simultaneous combination of various instruments and vocals, or one instrument played in different ways, can be created over the course of one musical piece which rivals the sounds of studio recording. Notable artists who incorporate this technique live include Ed Sheeran, Keller Williams, That 1 Guy, Zach Deputy, and KT Tunstall. Rick Walker is another looper and multi-instrumentalist who has organized looping festivals, including a long-running annual one in Santa Cruz, California, and others in various countries. Live looping can be sung along prerecorded sounds.

== Developments ==
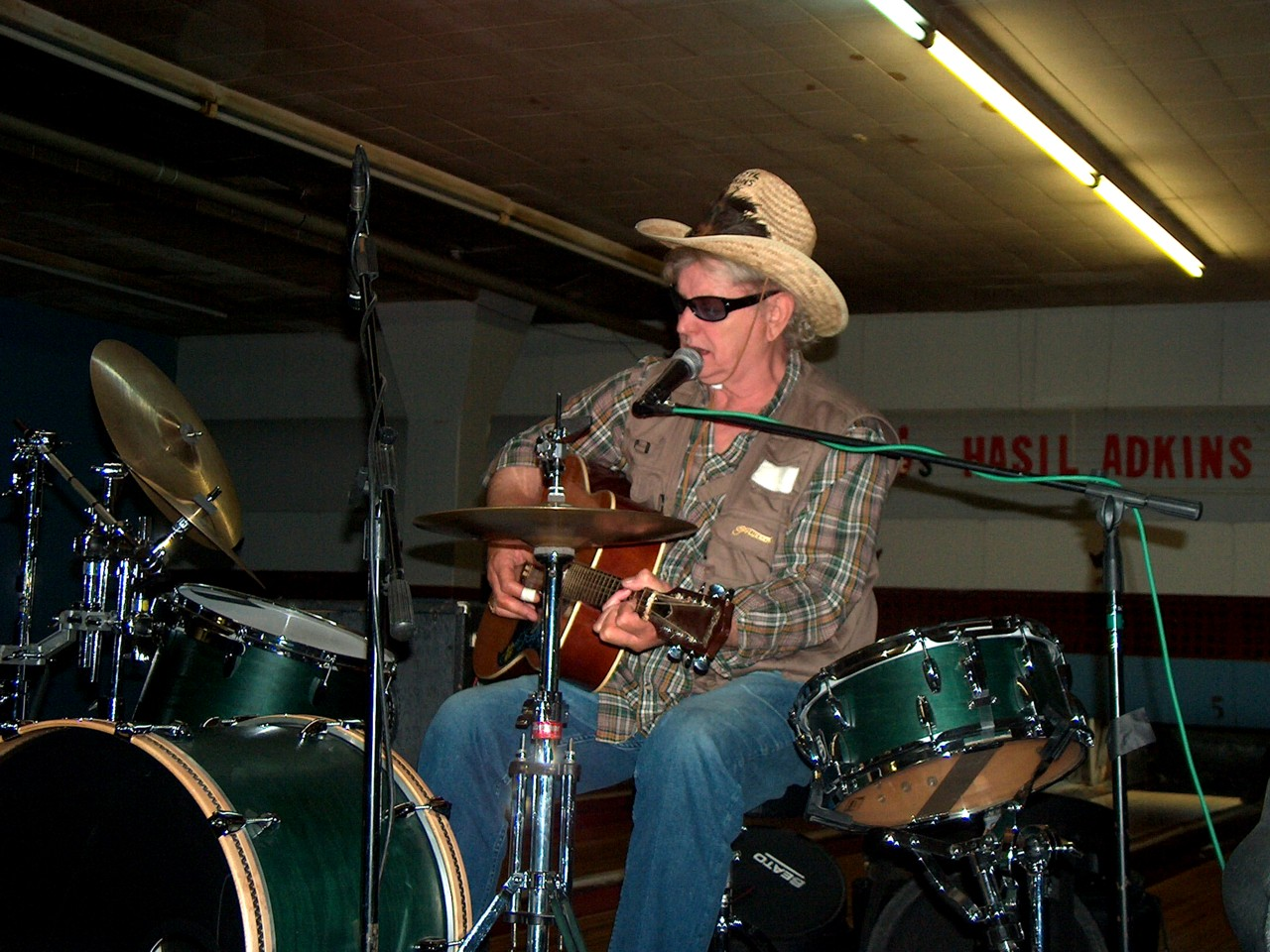
Hasil Adkins performing at Seidel Lanes as part of the "Rock n' Bowl" concert series presented by the Roots Cafe in Baltimore, Maryland

Since the development of Musical Instrument Digital Interface (MIDI) in the 1980s, musicians have also incorporated chest-mounted MIDI drum pads, foot-mounted electronic drum triggers. Some "one-man bands" use organ-style pedal keyboards to perform basslines. A small number of MIDI enthusiasts use custom-made MIDI controllers connected to different parts of their bodies to trigger music on synthesizers. Custom-made MIDI controllers range from wind-operated controllers to small triggers mounted on the arms or feet. At a certain point, the use of body MIDI controllers may come to resemble performance art, because the musical sounds are triggered by the performer assuming certain poses or dancing. One of the pioneers of this performance art is McRorie Live Electronic, who uses drum sensors on his shoes, tom sensors on his chest, separate rhythm and bass keyboards and vocal lead instruments.
