= Nortt / Xasthur =

Xasthur/Nortt

Studio album (split) by Xasthur and Nortt
- Released: December 2004
- Genre: Black metal Funeral doom Black ambient
- Length: 37:05
- Label: Total Holocaust; Southern Lord

Xasthur chronology
Xasthur / Leviathan (2004)	Nortt / Xasthur (2004)	Subliminal Genocide (2006)

Nortt chronology
Gudsforladt (2003)	Nortt / Xasthur (2004)	Ligfærd (2005)

Nortt / Xasthur is a split album by the American one man band Xasthur and the Danish one man band Nortt. This split album was re-issued on CD and LP by Southern Lord Records with different artwork. The LP version is limited to 1000 copies: 300 on clear vinyl and 700 on black vinyl.

== Track listing ==
1. Nortt – "Hedengangen (intro)" – 1:54
2. Nortt – "Glemt" – 7:37
3. Nortt – "Død og borte" – 5:53
4. Nortt – "Dystert sind (outro)" – 2:21
5. Xasthur – "A Curse for the Lifeless" – 4:28
6. Xasthur – "Blood from the Roots of the Forest" – 10:24
7. Xasthur – "Lurking in Silence" – 4:24
