= Defective Epitaph =

Studio album by Xasthur
- Released: September 25, 2007
- Genre: Black metal
- Length: 75:00
- Label: Hydra Head (HYH-130-2), Enemies List Home Recordings
- Producer: Xasthur

Xasthur chronology
Subliminal Genocide (2006)	Defective Epitaph (2007)	All Reflections Drained (2009)

Professional ratings
Review scores
Source	Rating
Allmusic	2/5 stars
Pitchfork Media	(6.9/10)

Defective Epitaph is a 2007 album by the American one-man black metal act Xasthur. This is the first recording on which Malefic played acoustic drums, although some tracks still make use of a drum machine. Like previous Xasthur albums, the lyrics were not released to the public ("The lyrics are unavailable upon request" inside the CD box). It was described by one reviewer as Xasthur's most accessible release to date. The Japanese edition released on Daymare Recordings features a bonus disc containing 5 unreleased tracks.

== Track listing ==
All tracks are written by Xasthur.

No.	Title	Length
1.	"Soulless Elegy"	2:42
2.	"Purgatory Spiral"	4:29
3.	"Cemetery of Shattered Masks"	6:03
4.	"Malignant Prophecy"	5:40
5.	"Oration of Ruin"	7:23
6.	"Legacy of Human Irrelevance"	5:36
7.	"Dehumanizing Procession"	4:52
8.	"Funerals Drenched in Apathy"	5:29
9.	"Worship (The War Against) Yourself"	7:34
10.	"A Memorial to the Waste of Life"	8:44
11.	"The Only Blood That Pours Is Yours"	8:15
12.	"Unblessed Be"	8:13
Total length:		75:00

Japanese bonus disc
No.	Title	Length
1.	"Untitled/Unreleased"	3:24
2.	"Untitled/Unreleased"	5:45
3.	"Morder Gjenklang Av Tankegangen"	10:54
4.	"Funerals Drenched in Apathy / Soulless Elegy (First Attempt)"	9:28
5.	"Awakening to the Unknown Perception of Evil (Second Attempt)"	8:02

== Personnel ==
- Malefic – vocals, all instruments
