= Portal of Sorrow =

Studio album by Xasthur
- Released: March 26, 2010
- Genre: Black metal, dark ambient
- Length: 55:13
- Label: Hydra Head

Xasthur chronology
All Reflections Drained (2009)	Portal of Sorrow (2010)	Subject to Change (2016)

Portal of Sorrow is the eighth studio album by American black metal act Xasthur. It would be Xasthur's last album of the black metal genre, as the next album Subject to Change features a more acoustic folk sound.

It was rated a four out of five by MetalSucks.

== Track listing ==
No.	Title	Length
1.	"Portal of Sorrow"	4:09
2.	"Broken Glass Christening"	3:50
3.	"Shrine of Failure"	4:27
4.	"Stream of Subconsciousness"	7:51
5.	"Karma/Death"	4:20
6.	"Horizon of Plastic Caskets"	3:49
7.	"Mesmerized by Misery"	2:52
8.	"This Abyss Holds the Mirror"	7:31
9.	"Mourning Tomorrow"	2:07
10.	"Miscarriage of the Soul"	3:26
11.	"Obeyer's of Their Own Deaths"	2:31
12.	"Released from This Earth"	4:27
13.	"The Darkest Light"	4:37
14.	"Hiver de Glace"	1:56

== Personnel ==
- Malefic – All instruments, vocals
- Marissa Nadler - Vocals
- Ronald Armand Andruchuk - Album artwork and layout
