= Telepathic with the Deceased =

Studio album by Xasthur
- Released: August 17, 2004
- Genre: Black metal
- Length: 57:37
- Label: Moribund
- Producer: Xasthur

Xasthur chronology
The Funeral of Being (2003)	Telepathic with the Deceased (2004)	To Violate the Oblivious (2004)

Professional ratings
Review scores
Source	Rating
Allmusic	3.5/5 stars

Telepathic with the Deceased is the third album by American black metal artist Xasthur. It was released on August 17, 2004, on Moribund Records.

In 2013, Decibel ranked Telepathic with the Deceased at number 65 on its list of the Top 100 Black Metal Albums of All Time.

== Track listing ==
All tracks are written by Xasthur.

No.	Title	Length
1.	"Entrance into Nothingness"	3:50
2.	"Slaughtered Useless Beings in a Nihilistic Dream"	4:49
3.	"Abysmal Depths Are Flooded"	6:51
4.	"May Your Void Become as Deep as My Hate!"	3:27
5.	"Telepathic with the Deceased"	9:42
6.	"A Walk Beyond Utter Blackness"	7:42
7.	"Cursed Revelations"	5:39
8.	"Drown into Eternal Twilight"	3:00
9.	"Murdered Echoes of the Mind"	10:03
10.	"Exit"	2:33
11.	"Storms Of Red Revenge - Rehearsal Track’98"	3:58
12.	"The Cold Earth Slept Below - Judas Iscariot Cover"	5:25
13.	"Suicide In Dark Serenity - Rehearsal Track February'04"	8:52

== Personnel ==
- Malefic – vocals, all instruments

=== Production ===
- Xasthur – arrangement, production, recording, engineering, mixing
- Kevin Nettleingham – mastering
