= Striborg =

- Origin: Snug, Tasmania, Australia
- Genres: Black metal, dark ambient, industrial (later)
- Years active: 1994–present
- Labels: Razed Soul Productions; Displeased; Southern Lord; Asgard Musik; Finsternis Productions

Striborg is Australian musician Russell Menzies's black metal / ambient. The project began in 1994 as Kathaaria. During that time, Menzies used the stage name "Vvelkaarn". Kathaaria derives from the Darkthrone song "Kathaarian Life Code".

Kathaaria released one album a year from 1995 to 1997. Following the third album, Menzies grew dissatisfied with the project. The first album as "Striborg" was released later that year. He adopted the stage name "Sin Nanna".

From 1997, Striborg played lo-fi black metal style combined with ambient pieces. Menzies recorded all instruments and vocals at home. He released two or more records per year, initially on the Asgard Musik and Finsternis labels. He later moved to Displeased and Southern Lord Records.

In 2018, the release of the dark ambient/new wave album Blackwave moved Striborg away from black metal. Menzies announced that he intended to pursue this musical direction on future releases. His live performances increased after Blackwave, showcasing this synth-heavy style. He later returned to black betal, but without electric guitar.

Menzies' lyrics deal with forests, darkness, night, misanthropy, and death. The names "Striborg" and "Sin Nanna" refer to a Slavonic wind god (of which the correct spelling is "Stribog") and a Mesopotamian moon god, respectively.

== Line-up ==
- Russell Menzies – All instruments and vocals

== Discography ==
Note: asterisk (*) indicates that the album has been re-released.

=== Compilations ===
- 2003: A Tragic Journey... / Through the Forest...
- 2003: Isle de Morts / Cold Winter Moon
- 2003: Misanthropic Isolation / In the Heart of the Rainforest*
- 2003: Nocturnal Emissions / Nyctophobia*
- 2004: 10 Years of Roaming the Forests (94-04)
- 2006: Misanthropic Isolation - Roaming the Forests
- 2008: In the Heart of the Rainforest / Through the Forest to Spiritual Enlightenment
- 2016: Purifying the River of Tears

=== Albums ===
- 1995: A Tragic Journey Towards the Light (as Kathaaria)
- 1996: Through the Forest to Spiritual enlightenment (as Kathaaria)
- 1997: Isle de Morts (as Kathaaria)
- 1997: Cold Winter Moon
- 1998: Misanthropic Isolation*
- 2000: In the Heart of the Rainforest
- 2004: Spiritual Catharsis*
- 2004: Mysterious Semblance*
- 2005: Black Desolate Winter / Depressive Hibernation*
- 2005: Trepidation*
- 2006: Embittered Darkness
- 2006: Nefaria
- 2007: Ghostwoodlands
- 2007: Solitude
- 2008: Autumnal Melancholy
- 2008: Foreboding Silence
- 2009: Perceiving The World With Hate
- 2009: Southwest Passage
- 2015: This Suffocating Existence
- 2016: Spiritual Deprivation
- 2017: A Procession of Lost Souls
- 2017: Instrumental Trans-Communication
- 2018: Blackwave
- 2019: Leave the World Behind
- 2019: An Existential Burden
- 2019: In Deep Contemplation
- 2020: Unknown Entities
- 2022: Lost in Between Worlds

=== Singles ===
- 2019: "A Perpetual Struggle of Restless Minds"
- 2019: "Dead Inside (Blackwave Version)"

=== Split releases ===
- 2007: "The Epitome of Misanthropy" (with Xasthur)
- 2007: "Psychedelic Nightmare" (with Scurshahor)
- 2009: "Florestas de Perpétua Solidão" (with Defuntos)
- 2009: "Black Hatred in a Ghostly Corner" (with Claustrophobia)
- 2010: "This Empty Coil" (with Vardan)
- 2018: "Spectral Shadows" (with Abigorum)
- 2019: "Striborg / Bosc Fosc / Drakonhail"

=== Videography ===
- 2007: Journey of a Misanthrope

=== Live shows ===
In May 2007, Sunn O))) did a Pacific Rim tour with a guest lineup consisting of Oren Ambarchi and Attila Csihar. However upon their arrival in Melbourne, Australia they joined with Sin Nanna for an improvisational performance. The makeshift group took up the name Pentemple and released one live album titled "0))) Presents...".

In January 2014, Striborg played live in the MONA FOMA music festival playing a new song titled "Purifying the River of Tears".

In June 2014, Sin Nanna performed live as Veil of Darkness for the first time supporting Sunn O))) as part of the Dark MOFO festival. He also played an unannounced set as Striborg on the final night of the festival.

=== Interviews ===
Until 2010, contact with Sin Nanna has been limited to online interviews on various blogs and fanzine sites conducted via email. Despite Sin Nanna's very anti social and misanthropic view of society, he agreed to take part in the 2010 Vice documentary One Man Metal, in which he further proved his eccentric lifestyle.
