= All Reflections Drained =

Studio album by Xasthur
- Released: April 21, 2009
- Recorded: October 2007 – July 2008
- Genre: Black metal
- Length: 56:42
- Label: Hydra Head (HH666-176)

Xasthur chronology
Defective Epitaph (2007)	All Reflections Drained (2009)	Portal of Sorrow (2010)

Professional ratings
Review scores
Source	Rating
Allmusic	3.5/5 stars
Pitchfork Media	(6/10)

All Reflections Drained is the seventh studio album by American black metal act Xasthur. It is available in an A5 Digipack with a Bonus Disc of songs "Experimenting in between the chapters" and as a limited edition cassette that includes pins and a patch (limited to 500 copies).

== Track listing ==
All tracks are written by Malefic.

No.	Title	Length
1.	"Dirge Forsaken"	5:41
2.	"Maze of Oppression"	5:13
3.	"Achieve Emptiness, Pt. 2"	4:39
4.	"Masquerade of Incisions"	15:33
5.	"Damage Your Soul"	4:52
6.	"Inner Sanctum Surveillance"	7:02
7.	"Obfuscated in Oblivion"	5:25
8.	"All Reflections Drained"	7:57
9.	"Sear Me III (Vinyl Only Bonus Track)"

== Bonus Disc ==
All tracks are written by Malefic.

No.	Title	Length
1.	"Torment"	4:54
2.	"Aura of Denial"	4:45
3.	"Flechcrawl"	0:44
4.	"Concealed Barren Thoughts"	6:08
5.	"Released From This Earth"	4:58
6.	"Untitles"	5:45
7.	"A Living Hell"	3:00
8.	"Trauma Will Always Linger"	14:20
9.	"Jomfrulysets Fall"	6:13
10.	"Outro"	0:23

- Note: Outro is not listed on the CD case.

== Personnel ==
- Malefic – all instruments, vocals
- M.H. – vocals, keyboards
