= Nocturnal Poisoning =

Studio album by Xasthur
- Released: September 8, 2002
- Recorded: April – September 2001
- Genre: Black metal
- Length: 69:00
- Label: Blood Fire Death; Southern Lord Records (SUNN44)
- Producer: Malefic

Xasthur chronology
Nocturnal Poisoning (2002)	The Funeral of Being (2003)

Nocturnal Poisoning is the debut album by the American black metal band Xasthur, released in 2002. The CD version of the album is limited to 2,000 copies.

== Track listing ==
No.	Title	Length
1.	"In the Hate of Battle"	9:04
2.	"Soul Abduction Ceremony"	7:44
3.	"A Gate Through Bloodstained Mirrors"	8:05
4.	"Black Imperial Blood" (Mütiilation cover)	5:50
5.	"Legion of Sin and Necromancy"	11:40
6.	"A Walk Beyond Utter Blackness"	6:27
7.	"Nocturnal Poisoning"	15:20
8.	"Forgotten Depths of Nowhere"	4:50
Total length:		69:00
