= A Gate Through Bloodstained Mirrors =

- Cover to the original edition of the album

Demo album by Xasthur
- Released: September 12, 2001
- Genre: Depressive suicidal black metal
- Length: 72:31
- Labels: Profane Productions (2001); Total Holocaust Records (2004); Debemur Morti Productions (2004); Hydra Head Records (2008)

Xasthur chronology
A Darkened Winter (2001)	A Gate Through Bloodstained Mirrors (2001)	Xasthur / Acid Enema split (2002)

Total Holocaust Records re-release

Professional ratings
Review scores
Source	Rating
AllMusic	link
Pitchfork Media	(8/10) link

A Gate Through Bloodstained Mirrors is a 2001 demo by the American black metal one-man-band Xasthur. Reviews of that release, first published by Profane Productions as a limited CD-R edition of 150 copies, proved to be positive, comparing the material to old Graveland and Burzum. With the increasing cult status of Xasthur, the demo was reissued by Total Holocaust Records, featuring a different mix and track list (CD and cassette, 2004). This edition was also published as a double-12" vinyl release by Debemur Morti Productions (2004) and finally by Hydra Head Records (double-CD release, the second CD containing further rare material, 2008).

== Track listing of the original demo (2001) ==
1. Intro – 01:16
2. Moon Shrouded in Misery, Part 1 – 6:46
3. Suicide in Dark Serenity – 10:39
4. Dwell Beneath the Woods of Evil – 5:14
5. Cursed Be the Memory of Light – 7:04
6. Possession of Desolate Magick – 5:40
7. Storms of Red Revenge – 4:16
8. A Spell Within the Winds – 4:34
9. Summon the End of Time – 4:52
10. Gate Through Bloodstained Mirrors – 8:32
11. Kingdom of Burning Crucifixions – 4:21
12. Moon Shrouded in Misery, Part 2 – 1:47
13. Black Spell of Destruction / Channeling the Power of Souls Into a New God – 7:34 Burzum cover.

== Total Holocaust Records release (2004) ==
For this first official release as a regular CD, all the tracks of the demo (which was originally published in mono) were remixed in 2003. The remixed version was used for the vinyl and double-CD editions (2004 and 2008).

=== Track listing ===
1. Intro (1:25)
2. Moon Shrouded In Misery (Part I) – 7:19
3. Suicide In Dark Serenity – 12:27
4. Dwelling Beneath The Woods – 5:29
5. Cursed Be The Memory Of Light – 7:28
6. Possession Of Desolate Magick – 5:47
7. Spell Within The Winds – 4:47
8. Storms Of Red Revenge – 2:45
9. Eternal Empire Of Majesty Death – 7:17
10. A Gate Through Bloodstained Mirrors – 8:40
11. Kingdom Of Burning Crucifixions – 4:43
12. Moon Shrouded In Misery (Part II) – 2:09
13. Black Spell Of Destruction (Version I) – 6:14
14. Lost Behind Bloodstained Mirrors (Outro) – 0:45

Notes: Track 9 is a Mütiilation cover. Track 13 is a Burzum cover.

== Release history ==
Country	Date	Label	Format	Catalog Nr.
United States	September 12, 2001	Ma-Kahru / Profane Productions	mono CD-R (150 copies)	profanecdr 001
Sweden	2004	Total Holocaust Records	Remastered cassette	thr-048
Sweden	2004	Total Holocaust Records	Remastered CD (1000 copies)	thr-050
France	August 31, 2004	Debemur Morti Prod.	Remastered double-12" (500 copies)	DMP0003
United States	January 29, 2008	Hydra Head Records	double CD	HH666-150
