= Jesse Fuller =

American one-man band musician (1896–1976)

- Fuller, c. late 1950s

Background information
- Also known as: Lone Cat
- Born: March 12, 1896; Jonesboro, Georgia, U.S.
- Died: January 29, 1976 (aged 79) Oakland, California, U.S.
- Genres: Blues, folk
- Occupations: Musician; songwriter
- Instruments: Guitar; vocals; harmonica; kazoo; percussion; fotdella
- Years active: Early 1950s–1976
- Labels: Good Time Jazz; Arhoolie

Jesse Fuller (March 12, 1896 – January 29, 1976) was an American one-man band musician, best known for his song "San Francisco Bay Blues".

== Early life ==
Fuller was born in Jonesboro, Georgia, near Atlanta, United States. He was sent by his mother to live with foster parents when he was a young child, in a rural setting where he was badly mistreated. Growing up, he worked at numerous jobs: grazing cows for ten cents a day; working in a barrel factory, a broom factory, and a rock quarry; working on a railroad and for a streetcar company; shining shoes; and even peddling hand-carved wooden snakes. By the age of 10, he was playing the guitar in two techniques, which he described as "frailing" and "picking".

In the 1920s, he lived in southern California, where he operated a hot dog stand and was befriended by Douglas Fairbanks. Fuller worked briefly as a film extra in East of Suez (1922) and The Thief of Bagdad (1924). In 1929, he settled in Oakland, across the bay from San Francisco, where he worked for the Southern Pacific Railroad for many years as a fireman and a gandy dancer. He married, and he and his wife, Gertrude, had a family. During World War II, he worked as a shipyard welder, but when the war ended, he found it increasingly difficult to secure employment. Around the early 1950s, Fuller began to consider the possibility of making a living as a musician.

== Music career ==
Up to this point, Fuller had never worked as a full-time professional musician, but he had his guitar and busked for money. He had a good memory for songs and had a large repertoire in diverse styles, including country blues, work songs, ragtime and jazz standards, ballads, spirituals, and instrumentals. For a while, he operated a shoe-shine stand, where he sang and danced to entertain passersby.

He began to compose songs, many of them based on his experiences on the railroads, and also reworked older pieces, playing them in his syncopated style. His one-man band act began when he had difficulty finding reliable musicians to work with: hence, he became known as "The Lone Cat". Starting locally, in clubs and bars in San Francisco and across the bay in Oakland and Berkeley, Fuller became more widely known when he performed on television in both the Bay Area and Los Angeles.

In 1958, at the age of 62, he recorded an album, released by Good Time Jazz Records. Fuller's instruments included 6-string guitar (an instrument which he had abandoned before the beginning of his one-man band career), 12-string guitar, harmonica, kazoo, cymbal (high-hat) and fotdella. He could play several instruments simultaneously, particularly with the use of a headpiece to hold a harmonica, kazoo, and microphone.

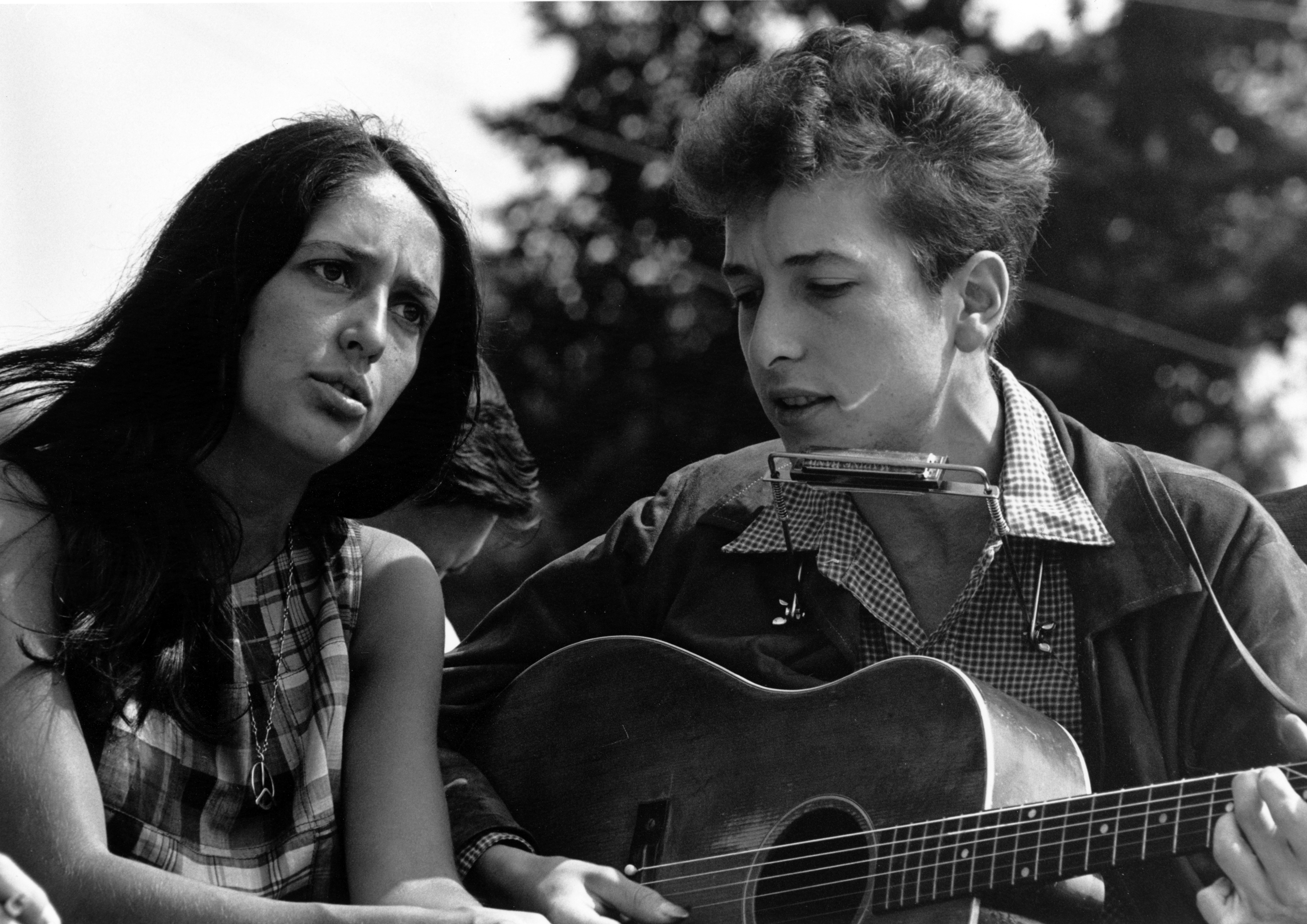
Bob Dylan adopted the use of a harmonica brace from Fuller

In addition, he would generally include at least one tap dance, soft-shoe, or buck and wing in his sets, accompanying himself on a 12-string guitar as he danced. His style was open and engaging. In typical busker's fashion, he addressed his audiences as "ladies and gentlemen," told humorous anecdotes, and cracked jokes between songs. He told of his love of his wife and family, but some of his stories were anything but cheerful, often including recapitulations of his tragic childhood, his mother's illness and early death, his determination to escape the segregated racial system of the South, suicide, and death.

In the summer of 1959, he was playing in the Exodus Gallery Bar in Denver. Bob Dylan spent several weeks in Denver that summer, and picked up his technique of playing the harmonica by using a neck-brace from Fuller.

The British label Topic Records issued his album Working on the Railroad in 1959 as a 10-inch vinyl LP, including "San Francisco Bay Blues". This recording is included as track six on the first CD of the Topic Records 70-year anniversary boxed set Three Score and Ten.

== The fotdella ==
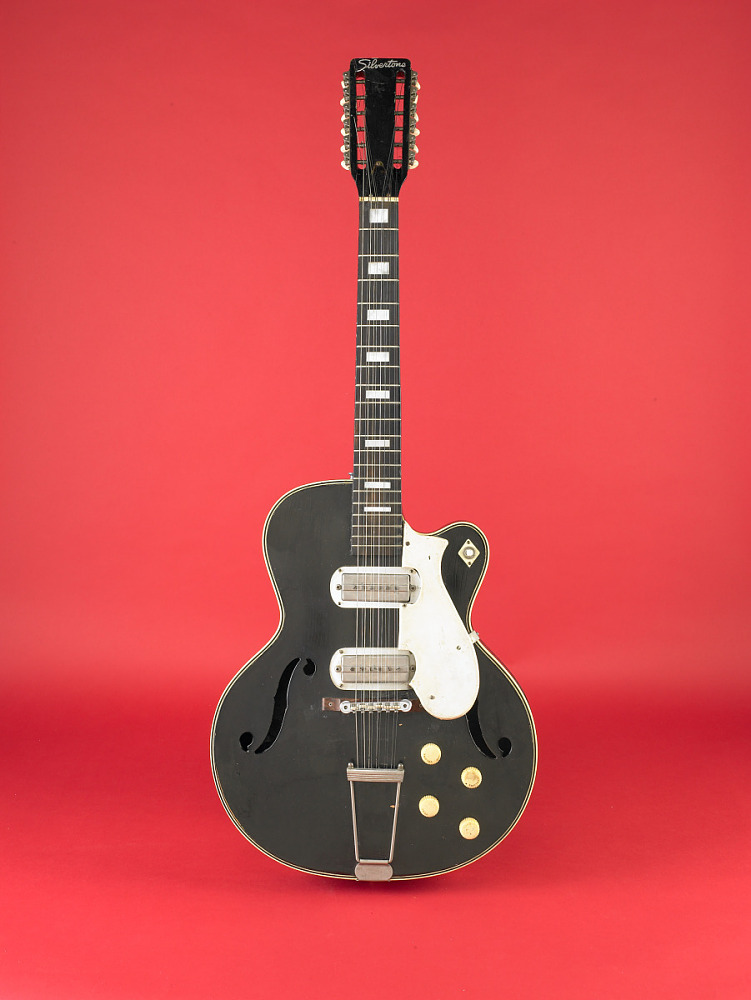
Fuller's Silvertone guitar hanging in the Smithsonian

The fotdella was a musical instrument of Fuller's own creation and construction. He built at least two of them, in slightly different patterns, as evidenced in photographs and film footage of his performances.

As a one-man band, Fuller wanted to supply a more substantial accompaniment than the typical high-hat (cymbal) or bass drum used by other street musicians. His solution was the fotdella, a foot-operated percussion bass, consisting of an upright wood box, shaped like the top of a double bass, with a short neck at the top, and six piano bass strings attached to the neck and stretched down over the body. The strings were played by means of six piano or organ pedals, each connected to a padded piano hammer which struck a string. Removing his shoe and placing his sock-covered foot in a rotating heel cradle, Fuller played the six pedals of the fotdella like a piano. With the instrument's six notes, he could play bass lines in several keys. He occasionally played without it, if a song exceeded its limited range.

The name was coined by his wife, who took to calling the instrument a "foot-diller" (a "killer-diller" instrument played with the foot), which was shortened to fotdella. The term foot piano has been used by some performers and musicologists to describe this type of instrument.

== Death ==
Fuller died on January 29, 1976, in Oakland, California, from heart disease, at the age of 79. He was interred at Evergreen Cemetery in Oakland. His fotdella and his 1962 Silvertone Electric-Acoustic guitar (the latter purchased from a Sears and Roebuck store in Detroit to replace his Maurer guitar, which had been stolen while he was on tour) are in the possession of the Smithsonian Institution.

== Influence ==
Fuller influenced and has had songs covered by Bob Dylan ("You're No Good"), Johnny Cash ("The Legend of John Henry"), Grateful Dead ("The Monkey and the Engineer" and "Beat It On Down the Line"), Ramblin' Jack Elliott, Hot Tuna, Peter, Paul and Mary, Janis Joplin, Jim Croce, Eric Clapton, Phoebe Snow ("San Francisco Bay Blues"), Don Partridge ("San Francisco Bay Blues", "Working on the Railroad" and "Stealin' Back to My Old Time Used to Be"), Glenn Yarbrough, Richie Havens, Paul McCartney, T. Nile, Dan the One Man Band, Mungo Jerry, Tim O'Brien & Hot Rize ("99 Years and One Dark Day"), Punch Brothers, and Dave Rawlings Machine ("Monkey and the Engineer").

During Fuller's UK tour in 1965, Don Partridge booked him for a sold-out concert in Ealing, west London, and was so influenced by Fuller that he developed his own stand-up one-man-band concept for street busking in the UK, later leading to his pop success.

== Selected discography ==
- Working on the Railroad (World Song, 1955)
- Frisco Bound (Cavalier, 1956)
- Jazz, Folk Songs, Spirituals & Blues (Good Time Jazz, 1958)
- Jesse Fuller: Greatest of the Negro Minstrels (Folk Lyric 126, 1963)
- San Francisco Bay Blues (Good Time Jazz, 1963)
- San Francisco Bay Blues (Prestige Folklore, 1963) [Different from the preceding record]
- Lining Up the Track & Railroad Blues
- Jesse Fuller's Favorites (Prestige, 1964)
- God Made the Blues (Folk Art Records, 1964)
- Move on Down the Line (Topic, 1965)
