= Denden-daiko =

Japanese hand-held pellet drum

Den-den daiko
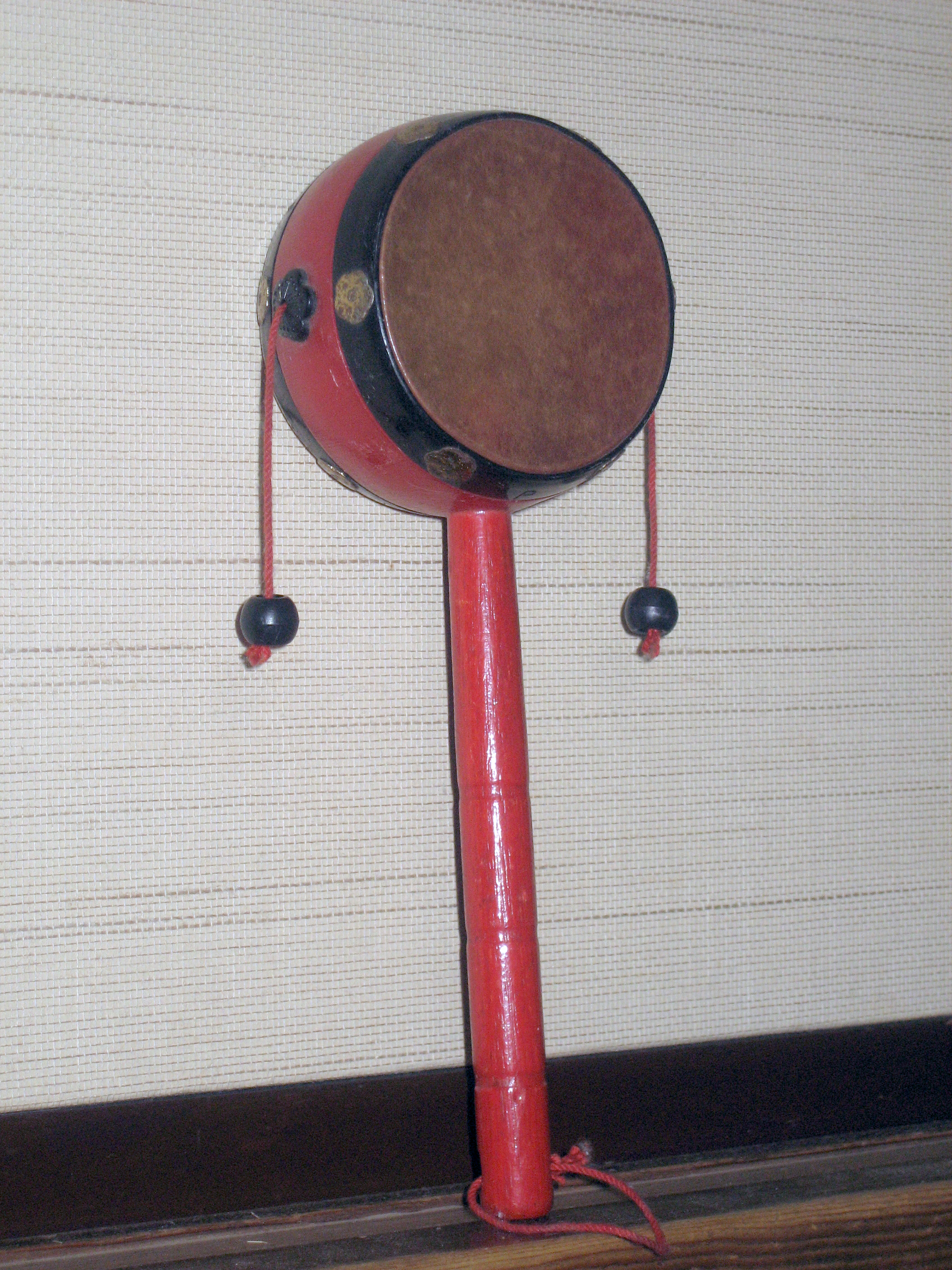

Japanese
- Classification: Percussion

Related instruments
- Pellet drum, drum, bell

The denden-daiko or denden-taiko (でんでん太鼓) is a Japanese children's toy drum, pellet drum, or tambourine attached to a long handle. It has two small bells attached with strings, which strike the drumhead when the handle is shaken. "Denden" is an onomatopoeia for the sound it makes, which gives the toy its name. They were popular during the 17th century.

The denden-daiko was derived from the furitsuzumi or fureifuri taiko, a double-sided pellet drum which originated in China and is used in Bugaku music.

== See also ==
- Damaru
- Taiko
