= Fotdella =

Fotdella is a foot-operated string bass musical instrument. Invented and constructed by Jesse "The Lone Cat" Fuller, an American one-man band musician, who needed an accompaniment instrument beyond the usual high-hat (foot-operated cymbal) or bass drum favored by street musicians.

== History ==
Fuller developed the instrument the early 1950s. It was a large upright box with a rounded top, shaped like the top of a double bass, with a short neck on top. Six bass strings were attached to the neck and stretched over the body. He later made five more models of various designs.

== Playing ==
To play the instrument, there was a homemade set of pedals, each pedal bringing a padded hammer to strike a string when depressed, like the action of a piano. With these six bass notes, Fuller could accompany himself on the 12-string guitar in several keys.

Fuller's wife took to calling it a "foot-diller" (as in the then-current expression, "killer-diller", meaning exceedingly good); and later, it became shortened to just fotdella. One of Fuller's later fotdella iterations is available for viewing at a museum in Seattle, Washington.

Dave Harris, an active one-man-band and author of 'Head, Hands, and Feet,' a comprehensive encyclopedia of one-man-bands, has designed and had built for him several fotdellas. Harris performs with them in Victoria, British Columbia.

After having seen one of Harris' performances in 2001, members of the band Frog & Henry built one of their own in 2010 in Ontario, Canada. They made the instrument from a double-bass, piano hammers, drum stands, and found materials.
