= Nortt =

Danish extreme metal project

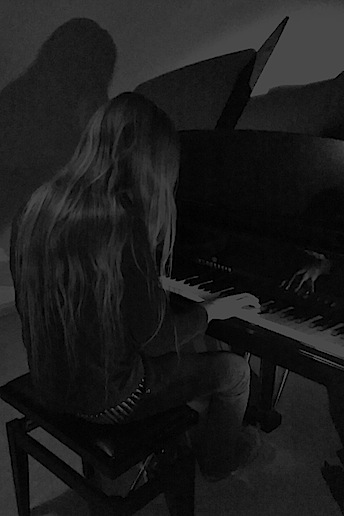
- Nortt playing piano, 2017

Background information
- Origin: Odense, Denmark
- Genres: Ambient black metal; funeral doom metal
- Years active: 1995–present
- Labels: Total Holocaust, Avantgarde Music, Southern Lord
- Website: Nortt on Instagram

Nortt is a Danish funeral doom metal project that consists of a musician under an eponymous pseudonym. The project was founded in 1995. The sole member describes his music as "pure depressive black funeral doom metal". Lyrics and imagery (for instance corpse paint) resemble other black metal acts, while the sound is closer to doom metal.

According to his official website, Nortt is fascinated by darkness, night, nihilism, solitude, misery, misanthropy and death. In an interview, he said, "Death ... is viewed as an inevitable and alluring phenomenon. Death is described from the perspective of the dying and from the dead. The uncertainty of death is preached as more thrilling than the well-known pain of life." He is a self-proclaimed nihilist, and thinks religion is for the weak. He views the occult and old pre-Christian, pagan religions with respect. Nortt believes a Satanist must be strong, because of its existentialism and free thought.

For his third full-length album, Galgenfrist, he signed with Italian label Avantgarde Music.

== Line-up ==
- Nortt (real name unknown) – vocals, guitar, bass, drums, keyboards

== Discography ==
=== Full-length albums ===
- Gudsforladt ["Godforsaken"] (2004) (containing previously released tracks, as well as new material)
- Ligfærd ["Funeral March/Journey of the Dead"] (2006)
- Galgenfrist ["Last Respite"] (2008)
- Endeligt (2017)
- Dødssang (2025)

=== EP releases ===
- Hedengang ["The Passing"] (2002)

=== Demos ===
- Nattetale (Rehearsal Version) (1997)
- Nattetale ["Night's Tale"] (1997)
- Døden... ["The Death…"] (1998)
- Graven ["The Grave"] (1999)

=== Split albums ===
- Nortt / Xasthur (with Xasthur) (2004) (containing tracks from Hedengangen EP)

=== Compilation albums ===
- Mournful Monuments 1998–2002 (2003)

== Interviews ==
- Interview (2004) on Antenna (in English)
- Interview (2004) on Black Alchemy (in Russian)
- Interview (2005) with Erin Fox on The Gauntlet (in English)
- Interview (2004) on Harm Magazine (in English)
- Interview (2004) with Paolo Vidmar on Metal Italia (in Italian)
