= Xasthur =

American music project by Scott Conner

- Origin: Alhambra, California, United States
- Genres: Black metal, dark ambient neofolk (2015–present)
- Years active: 1995–2010, 2015–present
- Labels: Profane, Blood Fire Death, Bestial Onslaught, Moribund, Total Holocaust, Profound Lore, Battle Kommand, Autopsy Kitchen, Southern Lord, Hydra Head, Turanian Honour, Avantgarde Music, Disharmonic Variations, Lupus Lounge
- Spinoffs: Twilight
- Members: Scott "Malefic" Conner
- Past members: Mike "Ritual" Pardi; Robert Nusslein; Christopher Hernandez; Rachel Roomian; Joe Larriva

Xasthur (/ˈzæstər/) is the project of American musician Scott "Malefic" Conner. Conner formed Xasthur in 1995 and released eight studio albums of black metal by 2010, when he announced the end of the project. However, he began using the name once again in 2015 to instead perform acoustic neofolk music. The first album with this new style was entitled Subject to Change, released in 2016.

== Etymology ==
The name "Xasthur" is a combination of "Hastur" and "Xenaoth". Conner explained that he found the former name in a Necronomicon paperback and believed that it referred to "a demoness who kills people in their sleep". The latter name referred to a celestial deity he read about in a book on the Afro-Caribbean religion Santería.

== History ==
Xasthur was created in December 1995 in Alhambra, California, after Conner had played with several local death metal groups in Southern California. Initially, the band began rehearsing and recording in a home studio with an unstable lineup. A 10-track tape of these early rehearsals was circulated on the trade scene. While the original of that tape was destroyed, some tracks appeared on re-releases of later albums.

For a self-released split album with Orosius, Conner was joined on drums and vocals by friend Mike Pardi from the band Draconis, who used the stage name "Ritual." Subsequently, Xasthur became Conner's solo project, although Khaija "Blood Moon" Ausar (of Dacon and Crimson Moon) later appeared as a session musician on the song "A Curse for the Lifeless" (from Nortt/Xasthur) and the EP Xasthur, Mark "M.H." Hunter performed on Defective Epitaph and All Reflections Drained, and Marissa Nadler sang on Portal of Sorrow.

Before releasing their first official full-length album in 2002, Xasthur recordings were distributed in limited editions, which were later re-released by the Swedish Total Holocaust Records and other small underground labels.

The band's first album, Nocturnal Poisoning (recorded April–September 2001), was released by the Blood Fire Death label in 2002. Southern Lord Records re-released a remastered double-LP version in 2005. In the following years, Xasthur's releases were issued through a variety of labels including Bestial Onslaught Productions, Moribund Records, Profound Lore Records, Battle Kommand Records, Autopsy Kitchen Records, Hydra Head Records, Turanian Honour Productions, Avantgarde Music and Disharmonic Variations.

Xasthur released several split albums with other black metal acts such as Acid Enema, Angra Mainyu, Black Circle, Nachtmystium, Leviathan, Nortt and Striborg; contributed to tribute albums to Burzum, Ildjarn, Judas Iscariot, Katatonia and Manes; and appeared on various compilation albums. Additionally, Conner collaborated with numerous bands including the drone metal project Sunn O))), Mord (with Lugubre members), Celestia and Gravesideservice, and participated on the first album by black metal supergroup Twilight.

On March 26, 2010, Conner announced that he was wholesaling Xasthur's eighth studio album, Portal of Sorrow. He also stated that this would be the last album under the Xasthur moniker, as he was dissolving the Xasthur musical project. Conner cited a lack of motivation, among other aspects, for ending Xasthur; he also stated that there would not be a reunion of this band. Conner remarked that another, non-metal musical project was in the works, later revealed to be called Nocturnal Poisoning, named after his 2002 album. Nocturnal Poisoning released three albums between 2012 and 2014: Other Worlds of the Mind, A Misleading Reality and Doomgrass.

On September 30, 2010, Conner released the first and only music video to date under the Xasthur name, for the song "Walker of Dissonant Worlds" from the To Violate the Oblivious album.

Conner was featured in One Man Metal, a 2012 Noisey documentary, alongside Jef Whitehead of Leviathan and Russell Menzies of Striborg. Despite having been released in 2012, the interviews were conducted in 2009.

On March 5, 2015, Conner announced on the official Nocturnal Poisoning Facebook page that the band were reverting to the name Xasthur. In reclaiming the name, he said: "For five years, Nocturnal Poisoning was locked out and denied every opportunity or open door that Xasthur used to have, or would've had. I worked hard at building up both projects, starting both of them from nothing and nowhere, but I'm taking back what's mine. Xasthur doesn't belong to the greedy hipsters that milk the metal business; it belongs to me and it's mine to take back." He noted that a new Xasthur album would be available in 2016 on the Disharmonic Variations label, and that the current version of the band (including contributions from Nocturnal Poisoning associate members Christopher Hernandez and Robert Nesslin) would be a continuation of Nocturnal Poisoning's acoustic-driven music, saying, "There's no need to rehash old Xasthur songs, the acoustic ones are plenty dark, and sometimes they're not. If you've been listening, reading, thinking and getting it, we could call it Xasthur acoustic/unplugged with, whatever, a country, blues, 'folk', bluegrass, doomgrass or singer/songwriter style and technique in it".

On April 16, Xasthur's first-ever live concert appearance was announced, to take place on June 19, 2015, at the Thirst for Light: Cascadian Summer Solstice II festival at Red Hawk Avalon in Pe Ell, Washington.

On September 4, the title for the next Xasthur album was announced as Subject to Change; it was released May 6, 2016 by Disharmonic Variations.

== Influences ==
Conner has noted other one-man black metal projects such as Burzum and Graveland as an inspiration for his singular approach: "The main way that Burzum inspired me (contrary to popular belief) was that he could do it all on his own-- why couldn't I?" Although similar in terms of low fidelity production and the wearing of corpse paint, musically and lyrically, the focus of the first edition of Xasthur was usually not on paganism, Satanism or anti-Christian blasphemy – as is common in the black metal genre – but rather on astral projection, darkness, despair, suicide, hate and death.

== Live ==
Conner has toured with Sunn O))) and has joined Nachtmystium onstage. Although he had previously stated that he "will always keep Xasthur a band that will not play live", because he would not be able to recreate what he puts "into it", Xasthur's first live concert took place in June 2015.

== Members ==
=== Current ===
- Scott "Malefic" Conner – vocals, all instruments (1995–2010, 2015–present)

=== Past ===
- Mike "Ritual" Pardi – drums and vocals (1996–1999)
- Robert Nesslin - vocals (2015). Took part in Nocturnal Poisoning's A Misleading Reality, Doomgrass, and Xasthur's Subject to Change
- Christopher Hernandez – guitar, vocals, harmonica, bass (2015–2021)
- Rachel Roomian — acoustic bass (2016–2018)
- Joe Larriva — guitar (2019–2021)

=== Past session musicians ===
- Khaija "Blood Moon" Ausar – keyboards on Nortt/Xasthur and "Xasthur"
- Mark "M.H." Hunter – vocals and ambience on Defective Epitaph and All Reflections Drained
- Marissa Nadler – vocals on Portal of Sorrow
- Ronald Armand Andruchuk – drums on Nocturnal Poisoning's Other Worlds of the Mind

== Discography ==
=== Studio albums ===
- Nocturnal Poisoning (2002, Blood Fire Death)
- The Funeral of Being (2003, Blood Fire Death)
- Telepathic with the Deceased (2004, Moribund Records)
- To Violate the Oblivious (2004, Moribund Records)
- Subliminal Genocide (2006, Hydra Head Records)
- Defective Epitaph (2007, Hydra Head Records)
- All Reflections Drained (2009, Hydra Head Records)
- Portal of Sorrow (2010, Disharmonic Variations)
- Subject to Change (2016, Disharmonic Variations)
- Victims of the Times (2021, Prophecy Productions)
- Inevitably Dark (2023, Prophecy Productions)
- Disharmonic Variations (2024, Prophecy Productions)
- Open to Misinterpretation (2026, Prophecy Productions)

=== Collaboration albums ===
- The Hallucination Tunnels with Casket of Dreams (2021, Appalachian Noise Records)

=== EPs ===
- Xasthur/Orosius split with Orosius (1999, self-released)
- A Darkened Winter (2001, self-released)
- Xasthur/Acid Enema split with Acid Enema (2002, self-released)
- Suicide in Dark Serenity (2003, Bestial Onslaught Productions)
- Xasthur/Angra Mainyu split with Angra Mainyu (2004, Total Holocaust Records)
- Xasthur/Leviathan split with Leviathan (2004, Profound Lore Records/Battle Kommand Records)
- Nachtmystium/Xasthur split with Nachtmystium (2004, Autopsy Kitchen Records)
- Nortt/Xasthur split with Nortt (2004, Total Holocaust Records)
- Xasthur (2006, Moribund Records)
- Striborg/Xasthur split with Striborg (2007, Autopsy Kitchen Records)
- Cryostasium/Xasthur split with Cryostasium (2007, Bestial Onslaught Productions)
- A Living Hell split with Black Circle (2008, Turanian Honour Productions)
- 2005 Demo (2010, Hydra Head Records)
- Self Deficient/Upscale Ghetto (2018, Disharmonic Variations)
- Aestas Pretium MMXVIII (2018, Lupus Lounge)

=== Demos ===
- Rehearsal '97 (1997, self-released)
- A Gate Through Bloodstained Mirrors (2001, Profane Productions)
- 2002 Rehearsal (2002, self-released)
- Sigils Made of Flesh and Trees (2017, Appalachian Noise Records)

=== Compilations ===
- Nightmares at Dawn (2012, Avantgarde Music)
- 1997-1999 Rehearsals (2013, self-released)
- Vol.1 Splits 2002-2004 (2024, Lupus Lounge)
- Vol.2 Splits & Bonus 2007-2009 (2024, Lupus Lounge)

=== Compilation appearances ===
- "Chill of the Night" and "Der Det Skjulte Lever" (Ildjarn covers) on Gathered Under the Banner of Strength and Anger: A Homage to Ildjarn (2004, Pestilence Records)
- "Erblicket die Töchter des Firmaments" (Burzum cover) on The Tribute (2005, Ash Nazg/Perverted Taste Productions)
- "Maane's Natt" (Manes cover) on Destroyers from the Western Skies (As Night Devours the Sun) (2005, KillZone Records)
- "Tyrant of Nightmares" on Reflections from the Abyss - Chapter I (2006, Kthulu Productions)
- "The Cold Earth Slept Below..." (Judas Iscariot cover) on To the Triumph of Evil (Witnesses to the Bringer of Life's Decay): A Tribute to Judas Iscariot (2006, ISO666 Releases)
- "Palace of Frost" (Katatonia cover) on December Songs - A Tribute to Katatonia (2006, Northern Silence Productions)

=== As Nocturnal Poisoning ===
- 2011 Demo EP (2012, self-released)
- Other Worlds of the Mind (2012, Disharmonic Variations)
- A Misleading Reality (2013, Disharmonic Variations)
- "Clarity Within Your Confusion" 7" single (2014, Children of the Night)
- Doomgrass (2014, The End Records)

=== With Twilight ===
- Twilight (2005, Southern Lord Records)

=== Guest appearances ===
- Vocals, guitar and keyboards on Sunn O)))'s Black One (2005, Southern Lord Records)
- Vocals on "Coma Mirror" from Sunn O))) and Earth's Angel Coma (2006, Southern Lord Records)
- Bass and keyboards on Mord's Imperium Magnum Infernalis (2006, Non Compos Mentis)
- Vocals and keyboards on Celestia's Frigidiis Apotheosia : Abstinencia Genesiis (2008, Paragon Records/Apparitia Recordings)
- Bass guitar on Gravesideservice's Masters in Lunacy (2011, Church of the Immaculate Deception)
- Bass guitar on Gravesideservice's Fog (2013, self-released)
