= Pellet drum =

Class of musical instruments

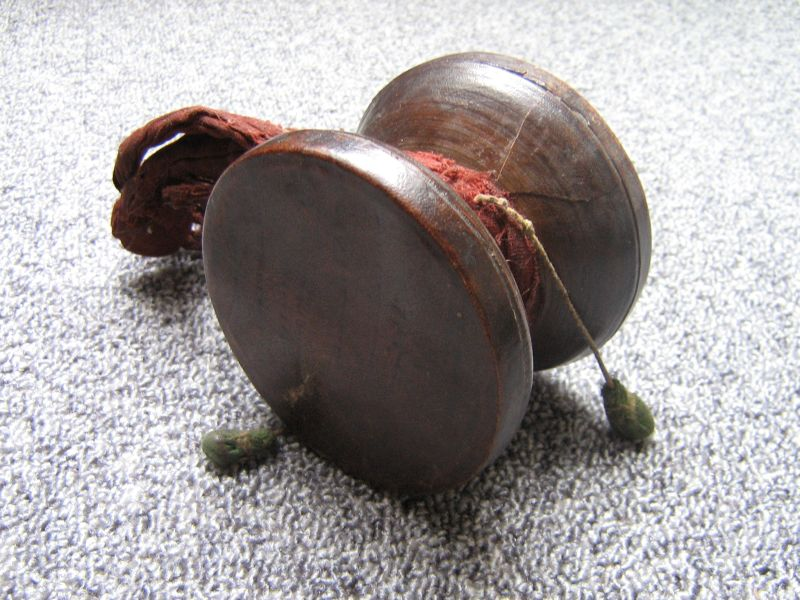
A Tibetan damaru

Pellet drums, or rattle drums, are a class of membranophone, or drum, characterized by their construction and manner of playing. They have two heads (either a single double-headed drum or two hemispherical single-headed drums joined together with the heads facing outward), and two pellets, each connected by a cord to the drum. The damaru, which is used in Tibet, Mongolia, and India, is an hourglass drum that is grasped by its waist with the hand twisting back and forth, causing the pellets to strike the heads in a rhythmic fashion.^{photo} In China, Korea, and Japan, pellet drums are affixed to or pierced by a vertical rod or pole, and, depending on the instrument's size, the rod or pole is rotated back and forth along its axis either with one or both hands or between the palms, causing the pellets to strike the heads in a similar manner.

Pellet drums may be either hourglass shaped or barrel shaped. In some cases, multiple drums are mounted on a single rod.^{photo}

Although pellet drums are often used in religious ritual (particularly Tibet, Mongolia, India, and Taiwan), small versions are also used in East Asia as children's toys or as noisemakers by street vendors. Such small versions are sometimes also referred to as rattle drums.

== Varieties ==
Beating of a Bolanggu.

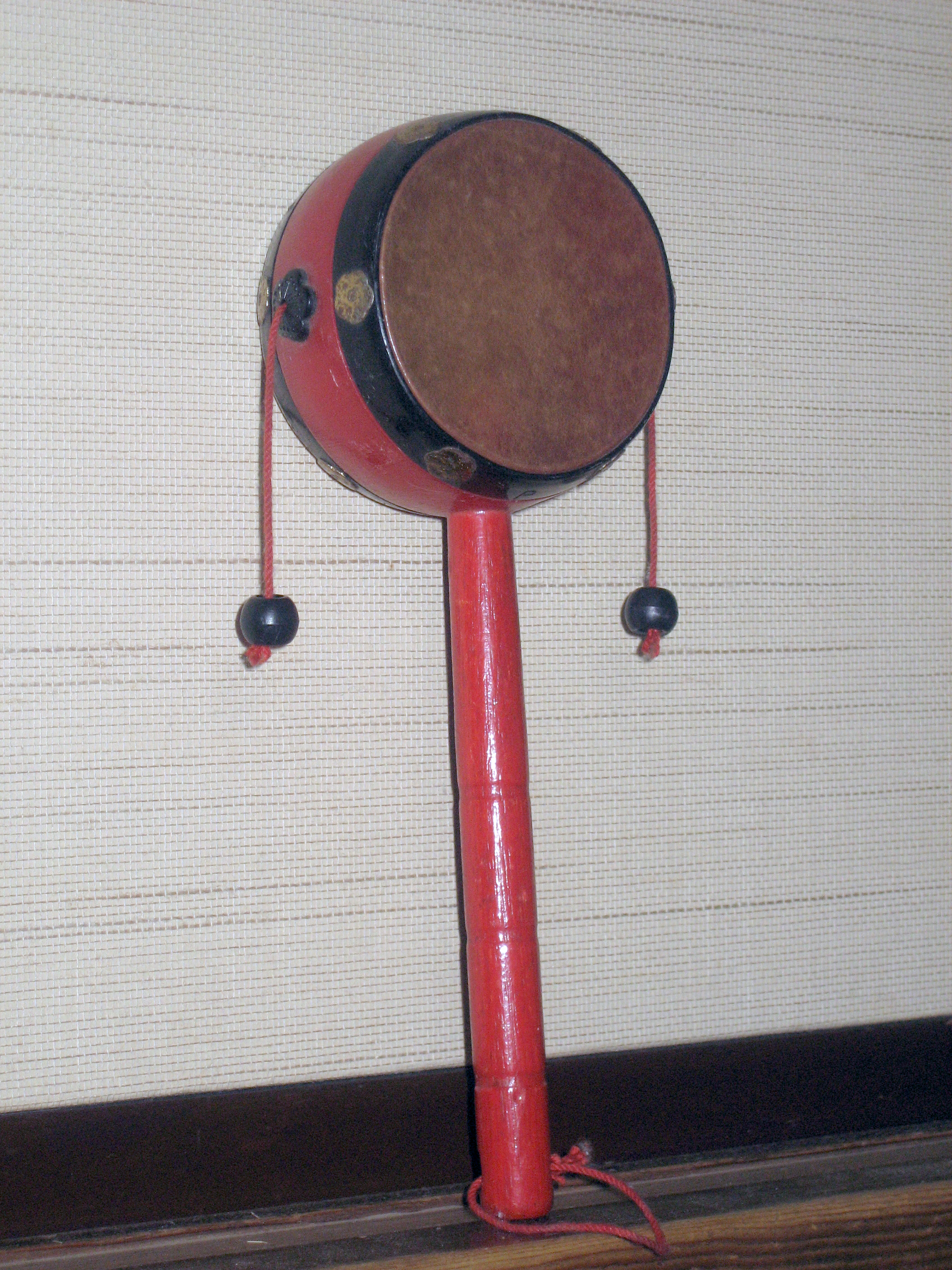
Den-den daiko

- Damru (also spelled damaru) - used in Tibet, Mongolia, and India
- Den-den daiko (でんでん太鼓) - used as a children's toy in Japan
- Do (hangul: 도; hanja; 鼗) - a single barrel drum pierced by a pole; used in Korea^{photo}
- Glong banthoh (กลองบัณเฑาะว์) - an hourglass drum used in Thailand with a pole on top, onto which a single string and pellet is tied, used in royal ceremonies.
- Nodo (hangul: 노도; hanja: 路鼗) - two barrel drums pierced by a pole; used in Korea^{photo}
- Noedo (hangul: 뇌도; hanja: 雷鼗) - three barrel drums pierced by a pole; used in Korea^{photo}
- Tao (鼗; pinyin: táo) or taogu (鼗鼓) or bolanggu (拨浪鼓) - used in Chinese ritual music and as a children's toy or noisemaker used by street vendors
- Yeongdo (hangul: 영도; hanja: 靈鼗) - four barrel drums pierced by a pole; used in Korea^{photo}
