= Subliminal Genocide =

Studio album by Xasthur
- Released: September 12, 2006
- Genre: Black metal
- Length: 70:24
- Label: Hydra Head; Battle Kommand Records

Xasthur chronology
To Violate the Oblivious (2004)	Subliminal Genocide (2006)	Defective Epitaph (2007)

Professional ratings
Review scores
Source	Rating
AllMusic	4.5/5 stars
Pitchfork	(7.8/10)

Subliminal Genocide is a 2006 album by the American one-man black metal act Xasthur. It was reviewed as being "more spiteful than...previous albums".

== Track listing ==
No.	Title	Length
1.	"Disharmonic Convergence"	1:50
2.	"The Prison of Mirrors"	12:42
3.	"Beauty is only Razor Deep"	7:00
4.	"Trauma will Always Linger"	8:29
5.	"Pyramid of Skulls"	2:36
6.	"Arcane and Misanthropic Projection"	9:40
7.	"Victim of Your Dreams"	6:12
8.	"Through a Trance of Despondency"	3:30
9.	"Loss and Inner Distortion"	4:04
10.	"Subliminal Genocide"	8:49
11.	"Malice Hidden in Surrealism"	6:37
12.	"Frozen" (Lycia cover, LP release only)
Total length:		70:24

== Personnel ==
- Malefic – vocals, all instruments, production
