= To Violate the Oblivious =

Studio album by Xasthur
- Released: July 2004
- Genre: Black metal
- Length: 53:34
- Label: Total Holocaust Records; Moribund Records

Xasthur chronology
Telepathic with the Deceased (2004)	To Violate the Oblivious (2004)	Subliminal Genocide (2006)

To Violate the Oblivious is a 2004 album by the American one-man black metal act Xasthur. After the original release on Swedish Total Holocaust Records, a re-mastered US pressing was released on Moribund Records in 2005 (featuring one bonus track). The same year, a limited double-vinyl edition was released on German label Perverted Taste (with yet another bonus track). The name of this album is misspelled on most streaming platforms as "To Violate the Obvious".

== Track listing ==
No.	Title	Length
1.	"Intro"	2:06
2.	"Xasthur Within"	6:14
3.	"Dreams Blacker than Death"	5:24
4.	"Screaming at Forgotten Fears"	8:24
5.	"Consumed by a Dark Paranoia"	3:40
6.	"Marked by Shadows"	6:43
7.	"Apparitional Void of Failure"	4:37
8.	"A Gate Through Bloodstained Mirrors"	12:06
9.	"Walker of Dissonant Worlds"	5:40
Total length:		53:34

- Track four is misspelled on most streaming platforms as "Screaming at Forgotten Tears".
