= Ligfærd =

Studio album by Nortt
- Released: 2006
- Recorded: 2004–2005
- Studio: Mournful Monument
- Genre: Black-doom, funeral doom
- Length: 45:23
- Label: Total Holocaust Records

Ligfærd (Funeral March/Journey of the Dead) is the second full-length album by Danish one-man Black/Funeral Doom metal band Nortt, released in 2006 on Total Holocaust Records.

== Track listing ==
1. "Gudsforladt" - 4:04
2. "Ligprædike" - 8:36
3. "Vanhellig" - 8:07
4. "Tilforn Tid" - 12:05
5. "Dødsrune" - 8:32
6. "Ligfærd" - 3:56
